= List of department stores of the United Kingdom =

This is a list of department stores of the United Kingdom. In the case of department store groups, the location of the flagship store is given. This list does not include large specialist stores, which sometimes resemble department stores. The list is broken into "currently trading" (A–Z); "defunct groups" and "defunct" (A–Z).

== Currently trading ==
=== A–F ===
Business name	Main location	Date started	Additional branches	References
Atkinsons	Sheffield	1865		
Austins	Newton Abbot	1924		
Bakers & Larners	Holt, Norfolk	1770	Also operates a builders merchant (C.T. Baker, the original business) and two franchise branches of the Budgens supermarket chain, including the largest by floor area in the UK in Holt and a smaller in Aylsham. The CT Baker group also owns a number of other retail properties in Holt.	
Baldwins	Stowmarket		* Dovercourt * Ipswich	
Banburys	Barnstaple	1900	Tiverton	
Barbours	Dumfries	1856		
Barkers	Northallerton	1882		
Beales	Poole	2020	* Peterborough * Southport	
Bennetts	Derby	1734		
Boundary Outlet Stores	Colne		* Grantham * Newcastle upon Tyne * Sheffield * Walsall	
Boyes	Scarborough	1881	80 stores trading mainly in northern and central England	
Bradbeers	Romsey	1837	* New Milton * Hedge End	
Browns	York	1890	* Helmsley * Beverley * Gainsborough	
Camerons	Ballymena			
Camp Hopson	Newbury	1921	Owned by the Brixton based Morleys Group which operates seven other stores.	
City Cycle Centre	Ely			
Clares	Llandudno	1927	Owned by Ulster Stores.	
Collingwood Batchellor	Horley	1968	Department store in Horley with smaller branches selling furniture and household goods. Their long-standing fashion department closed following a refurbishment in 2013.	
Creasey & Son	St Peter Port	1899		
W J Daniel & Co.	Windsor	1901	* Chiswick * West Ealing	
Vincent Davies & Sons	Haverfordwest	1906		
Dawsons	Clitheroe	1936		
J Dixon & Son	Whitehaven	1882		
Downtown	Grantham	1804	Boston	
Dunnes Stores	Bangor, County Down	1944	Group of 155 stores trading in the UK, Republic of Ireland and Spain	
Elliotts	Lymington	1872		
Elys	Wimbledon	1876	Owned by the Brixton based Morleys Group which operates seven other stores.	
The Emporium	Maldon	2004		
Elphicks	Farnham	1881		
Eve & Ranshaw	Louth	1781		
Facy	Henley-on-Thames			
Fenwick	Newcastle upon Tyne	1882	Group of 9 department stores	
Fields	Sidmouth	1809		
Fortnum & Mason	Piccadilly, London	1707		

=== G–O ===
Business name	Main location	Date started	Additional branches	References
Glasswells	Bury St. Edmunds	1946	Branches across Suffolk	
Goulds	Dorchester	1902	Also operate Simpson in Sidmouth	
Harrods	Knightsbridge, London	1849		
Harry's	Lerwick			
Harts Of Stur	Sturminster Newton	1919		
Harvey Nichols	Knightsbridge, London	1831	Group of 14 stores, seven of which are located in the UK: Birmingham * Bristol * Edinburgh * Leeds * Liverpool * Manchester	
Harveys of Halifax	Halifax	1920s		
Hatchers	Taunton	1775		
Hills of Spalding	Spalding	1960		
Hoopers	Torquay	1982	Group of four department stores with branches at Harrogate, Tunbridge Wells and Wilmslow.	
House of Fraser	Oxford Street, London	1849	Group of traditional department stores in the UK; stores include: Glasgow * Birmingham	
T J Hughes	Liverpool	1912	Group of 16 department stores	
Jarrold & Sons	Norwich	1770	Group comprising one department store and associated smaller shops	
John Lewis & Partners	Oxford Street, London	1864	The largest of the traditional department store groups in the UK in terms of sales and profit. John Lewis owns 30 full-line department stores. Nine long-established stores, each trading under their original name, have been re-branded as 'John Lewis' since 2000. Peter Jones in Chelsea, London retains its original names. Stores include: Cardiff * Cheltenham * Cribbs, Bristol * Edinburgh * Newcastle upon Tyne * Reading * Peter Jones, Sloane Square, London	
Jolly's	Bath	1823		
Lathams	Potter Heigham	1964		
Leekes	Pontyclun	1897	* Bilston * Cross Hands * Llantrisant * Melksham	
Liberty	Regent Street, London	1875		
Lilliput Textiles	Bridport	1986		
Marks & Spencer	Marble Arch, Oxford Street, London	1884	Branches throughout the UK	
Menarys	Cookstown	1923	Branches throughout Northern Ireland	
C Milner & Sons	Leyburn	1882		
Morleys	Brixton	1897	Group of seven department stores: Morleys - Brixton, Morleys - Bexleyheath, Camp Hopson - Newbury, Elys - Wimbledon, Jolly's - Bath, Pearson - Enfield, Roomes - Upminster, Selby's - Holloway.	

=== P–Z ===
Business name	Main location	Date started	Additional branches	Refs
Peters	Huddersfield	1982		
Pettits	Wallingford	1856		
Potters of Buxton	Buxton	1860		
Quadrant	Chelmsford	1969	Braintree	
Roomes of Upminster	Upminster	1888		
Rossiters of Bath	Bath	1961	A Cardiff branch in the Morgan Arcade closed in 2017 after 10 years in the city.	
Roys of Wroxham	Hoveton	1895	Beccles, Dereham, Norwich, North Walsham, Sudbury, Thetford	
Rutherford & Co	Morpeth	1846		
Sanderson's Boutique	Fox Valley, Sheffield	2016	Morpeth, Stroud	
John Sanders	Ruislip	1865		
James Selby	Holloway	1895		
Selfridges	Oxford Street, London	1908	Birmingham, Manchester, Trafford Centre	
Sinclairs of Sheffield	Sheffield	1962	Stamford	
Stringers	Lytham	1852		
Tamworth Co-operative Society	Tamworth	1886		
C J Townrow & Sons	St. Ives, Cambridgeshire	1871	* Maldon, Essex * Frinton-on-Sea * Sudbury	
Trago Mills	Newton Abbot	1960s	* Liskeard * Merthyr Tydfil * Falmouth	
Tylers Department Store	Loughborough	1922		
Ulster Stores	Moore of Coleraine	1925	The White House, Portrush; Clares of Llandudno, Llandudno – established 1928; purchased by Ulster Stores in 2002; de Gruchy St Helier	
Voisins	St Helier	1837		
Walker & Ling	Weston-super-Mare	1892		
Warden Brothers	Newtownards	1877		
Wetherells	Selby	1898		
Wilkies	Falkirk	1898	Small chain in Scotland with department stores in Falkirk and Ballater and 11 smaller stores.	
Wroes	Bude	1919	Launceston, Wadebridge	
R Yates & Sons	Malton	1845		

== Defunct department store groups ==
Business name	Main location	Date started	Description	No. Of stores at peak	Closed	References
Allders Department Stores	Croydon	1862	Group went into administration on 29 January 2005. All branches were subsequently sold or closed. The flagship Croydon store continued to trade independently after 2005, finally closing on 22 September 2012.	50	2012	
J J Allen	Bournemouth	1899	Group acquired by House of Fraser in 1969. Merged into E Dingle & Co.	6	1971	
John Anstiss	Swindon	1896	Holding company of a number of department stores and large drapery stores including Arding & Hobbs (acquired 1938) and Owles & Beaumont in London, Blooms of Salisbury, Guards of Romsey and Smith & Strange of Worthing. Bought by United Drapery Stores in 1948 and later sold on to Hide & Co.		1975	
Army & Navy Stores	Victoria Street, London	1871	Group acquired by House of Fraser in 1973	27	2005	
Arnotts	Glasgow	1850	Group created by House of Fraser for stores in Scotland.		2005	
T Baird & Sons	Wishaw		Group of department stores acquired by House of Fraser in 1970 from Selincourt & Sons Ltd of London and subsequently incorporated into the Arnotts group. The branches in Hamilton, Airdrie and Bellshill were later sold by House of Fraser as a going concern to a management buyout led by Murdoch McMaster, and reverted to the Bairds name.	16	2014	
John Barker & Co.	Kensington	1870	Group acquired by House of Fraser	5	2006	
Beales	Bournemouth	1881	Group went into administration. Poole, Peterborough and Southport stores since reopened under the Beales name.	41	2020	
Beatties	Wolverhampton	1877	Group acquired by House of Fraser	12	2019	
Bentalls	Kingston upon Thames	1867	Group acquired by Fenwick	9	2017	
Benzie & Miller	Fraserburgh	1920	Group acquired by House of Fraser in 1958 and subsequently incorporated into the Arnotts group	5	1970s	
H Binns, Son & Co.	Sunderland	1807	Group of 9 stores acquired by House of Fraser. Expanded to include stores across the north and east of England.	18	2006	
Blacketts	Sunderland	1826	Group acquired by Hide & Co.	5	1972	
Bobby & Co.	Margate	1887	Group acquired by Drapery Trust in 1927 and merged with Debenhams	18	1972	
Bon Marché	Brixton	1877	Group of department stores (Pratts of Streatham; Barrats of Clapham Junction; Quin & Axten) acquired by Selfridge Provincial Stores.	4	1926	
Brighton Co-operative Society	Brighton	1887	Group merged with Co-operative Wholesale Society.		2006	
Brights	Bournemouth	1871	Group of three department stores, trading under the names Brights and Colsons of Exeter, acquired by J J Allen	3	1960	
Brown Muff	Bradford	1814	Group acquired by House of Fraser. Absorbed into Rackhams group.	4	1978	
British Home Stores	Oxford Street, London	1928	Fell into administration on 25 April 2016 to eventually close all branches on 28 August 2016.	171	2016	
Canadian & English Stores (also Northgate & English Stores & Combined English Stores)	Liverpool	1951	A company created to buy and run retail businesses for investor by Harry Brooks. Sir Samuel R. Hogg was appointed chairman in 1958 after investigating a shareholder row over a £1 million loss. The same year they sold their Canadian operations. The company grew into an operating company that managed furniture, clothing and department stores. In 1962 they purchased a manufacturing group called Northgate and changed the company name to Northgate and English Stores. The business was split into two in 1966, with the retail business becoming Combined English Stores. Department stores owned by Canadian and English included: Oxleys; North London Drapery Stores - purchased 1961; Benjamin Beardmore Evans (B. B. Evans) - purchased 1962; J. B. Brown - purchased 1962; V H Jarvis	6	1966	
Chiesmans	Lewisham	1884	Group acquired by House of Fraser and eventually incorporated into the Army & Navy group	12	Late 1970s	
James Colmer	Bath	1870	Group of 5 department stores acquired by Owen Owen	5	1973	
The Co-operative Group	Manchester	1844	Operators of 36 department stores, many trading under the "Living" brand, 7 of which were sold to Anglia Regional Co-operative Society in 2006, all others closed	36	2006	
Co-operative Retail Services	Manchester		Merged with Co-operative Wholesale Society to form The Co-operative Group		2000	
Co-operative Wholesale Society	Manchester		Merged with Co-operative Retail Services to form The Co-operative Group		2000	
Debenhams	Oxford Street, London	1778	Went into administration 2020. Brand bought by BooHoo and all stores closed in May 2021.	178	2021	
E Dingle & Co.	Plymouth	1880	Group acquired by House of Fraser in 1971. Became group trading name for stores in the south west of England.	26	2006	
Doggarts	Bishop Auckland	1895	Group of small department stores based in the North East.	17	1980	
Drapery Trust		1925	Holding company of a group of department stores; purchased by Debenhams in 1927; amalgamated with Debenhams.	14	1973	
Eaden Lilley	originally Cambridge, then Saffron Walden	1760	Started in Cambridge, expanded to include stores in Saffron Walden and Great Sheldon. Cambridge store closed in 1999.	3	2009	
East of England Co-operative Society	Ipswich	1868	Department stores sold to Vergo Retail in 2009	9	2009	
David Evans	Swansea	1900	group of three department stores, 2 of which were acquired by House of Fraser in 1977 and merged into Dingles grouping.	3	1977	
Fear Hills	Trowbridge	1880	Group of four department stores. Trowbridge store moved to the former Hill Hall cinema in around 1926. Additional stores in Frome, Wells (formerly J. N. Button 1945) and Edwin Henley in Shepton Mallet. Became part of E Dingle & Co.	4		
Featherstones	Chatham	1901	Small Kent based group	6	1981	
Gammons	Guildford	1864	Small department store chain based in Surrey and Kent. Started by Ebenezer Gammon & his brother James Fielder Gammon in Godalming, the partnership was dissolved in 1871 and Ebenezer moved the business to Guildford. Branches were opened in Cobham, Woking, Cranleigh and Ripley, Surrey and Cranbrook, Kent. Purchased by Debenhams in 1961. Guildford store closed in 1968 to coincide with the opening of a new Plummer Roddis in the town. Other stores closed in the 1970s with Woking closing in 1983.	6	1961	
Goldbergs	Glasgow	1908	Glasgow based group with stores in Scotland and one in England.	15	1990	
Grant-Warden	Walton on Thames		Stores in Walton on Thames, Nottingham (formerly Tobys) and Ilford. Bought by Beales.			
Great Northern and Southern Stores		1936	Holding company of the fourth largest group of department stores during 1930s. Purchased Hide & Co in 1939 and through a reverse takeover, Hide & Co became the holding company.		1939	
Great Universal Stores		1900	Multi retail group run by Sir Isaac Wolfson, who owned several department stores between 1950s and 1980s. Stores included Attwoods (Kidderminster), Bainbridges (Lincoln), Beavans (Byker), Darling & Co. (Edinburgh), Houndsditch Warehouse (Houndsditch, London), Jones & Higgins (Peckham) and J Robb & Co (Belfast)).		1986	
Edward Grey	Birmingham	1891	Midlands based group acquired by Debenhams in November 1958, then with stores in Bull Street, Birmingham, Walsall, Dudley, Leamington Spa, Rugby, Worcester and Stourbridge. The Walsall branch continued to trade as Debenhams until 2021.	7	1958	
Harrods	Knightsbridge	1849	Group acquired by House of Fraser; the flagship Knightsbridge store is now independently owned and continues to trade as Harrods.	9	1970s	
Heart of England Co-operative Society	Nuneaton	1832	Co-operative group of food and non-food businesses formerly operated 7 department stores, at locations including Nuneaton and Coventry.	7	2016	
Henry's Stores	Manchester	1923	Founded by Henry Cohen, he opened Smart Outfitting Company in 1910, before turning down a chance to join Marks & Spencer, opening Henry's Stores in Market Street, Manchester. The business was a discount department store, and grew to further branches, including Birmingham and Stockport. Stores were purchased in 1968 by British Home Stores.	11	1968	
Hide & Co.	Kingston upon Thames	1873	Founded in 1873 after Joseph Hide bought the Kingston upon Thames store of William Shrubsole, who was retiring. In 1939 Great Northern and Southern Stores bought Hide & Co but through a reverse takeover, the company became Hide & Co. Was investigated for fraudulent behaviour in 1948 over previous takeovers. Purchased by Tootal in 1965 for its ladies clothing store brands that were merged into the Van Allen chain. Group acquired by House of Fraser in 1975. Stores included: Hides of Bridgwater (formerly Great Northern and Southern Store); Goorwitch (Northern Ireland); Bickers (Dewsbury); Bickers (Shrewsbury); Rightons (Evesham); Webbers (Oxford)	20	1975	
Hills & Steele		1937	Formed from the former New Universal Stores group, that had been created by Great Universal Stores and American Charley Nicholls. In 1937 Canadian retailer Zellars purchased Nicholls shares and renamed the business to Hills & Steele. In 1939, with the business losing money, Great Universal Stores bought out Zellars, but five years later sold the business to British Home Stores. In the 1960s British Home Stores either closed or rebranded the stores under their own name.		1960s	
Hurst & Sandler			Principally a manufacturer of gowns and other textile goods. The company owned a number of subsidiary wholesale and retail drapery businesses in Yorkshire, including Willis Brothers of Hull and Ludlows of Bradford (merged to form Willis Ludlow), John Banner of Sheffield, Lingards of Bradford and Rushworths of Huddersfield. Acquired by United Drapery Stores.			
Keddies	Southend-on-Sea	1892	Southend-based department store that expanded with several new branches during the 1970s, before closing them during the 1980s and going into administration in 1994	4	1994	
Lewis & Hyland	Ashford	1834	Drapers and outfitters opened by George Alexander Lewis, joined by Frederick Hyland in 1857. Expanded to include branches in Cliftonville, Dartford, Folkestone (opened 1857 as G A Lewis, later Lewis & Goble), Ramsgate, Sittingbourne, Tenterden (opened 1846). The business grew to include groceries, furniture, toys and household goods. The largest stores were in Ashford, Folkestone and Ramsgate. The original Ashford store was demolished in 1975, the business relocating to the Tufton Centre, closing in 1980. The final store to close was the Tenterden branch. The business was bought by drapers Whites of Kent.	16	1986	
Lewis's	Liverpool	1856	Group went into administration in 1991. A number of stores were subsequently acquired by Owen Owen. The flagship Liverpool store was last owned by Vergo Retail and closed on 29 May 2010.	18	2010	
Lincolnshire Co-operative	Lincoln	1861	Operated a number of department stores, the remaining two of which, in Lincoln and Gainsborough, were acquired by Oldrids in 2013. The co-operative continues to operate a number of businesses outside of non-food retail.		2013	
London Co-operative Society	Stratford	1920	Group amalgamated with Co-operative Retail Services in 1981		1981	
William McIlroy	Swindon	1875	Group of department stores originally established in Swindon.	22	1998	
McMaster Stores		1989	Group of seven stores (Airdrie; Ayr; Banff; Bellshill; Hamilton; Irvine; Stirling) purchased from House of Fraser in a management buyout led by Murdoch McMaster. The business went into administration in 1993. Hourstons in Ayr and Bairds in Hamilton were bought by Jebrell family, while Mackay Stores bought the Banff store.	7	1993	
Macowards	Cardiff		Founded by Maurice Lermon in 1937 to buy the businesses of Lermons of Cardiff, Macowards of Swansea and G W Davies of Bargoed. The business expanded by purchasing drapery, furnishing and department stores. They challenged GUS for the purchase of Jones & Higgins. The company faced a takeover bids from both James Howell & Co and A Wilson Stores in 1960, which was fought off by the board. During the late 1960s Oliver Jessel's Jessel Securities started investing in the business by purchasing a 27% shareholding, and completing a takeover in 1971. In 1970/71 the group turnover was £7,740,000 with a profit before tax of £263,492. In 1973 the group became Maples-Macowards after the furniture group Maple & Co was purchased for £14.4 million. Jessel Securities collapsed in 1974, and eight of the stores were sold to Owen Owen. Maple was sold to Waring & Gillow in 1980, and the last Macowards store in Llanelli closed in 1984. Stores included: Clegg, Wilmslow; Colliers Stores, Liverpool; James Cock, Burslem; J W Coombs, Northwich; G. L. Davies t/a The Emporium, Bargoed; Dawson & Co, Sidcup; J F Densons, Chester; Samuel Hall, Cardiff; H E Keightley & Son, Lincolnshire; Kendalls, Malvern; Lermons, Cardiff; Macowards, Cardiff & others; Maddox & Co, Shrewsbury; Midland Drapery Company, Derby; Penningtons, Spalding; Reynolds, Newport; George Sturla & Co (Various sites); W J Wade, Brighton; Thomas Wallis & Co, Oxford Street, London and others; W S Wood, Colwyn Bay	possibly 35		
Marshall & Snelgrove	Oxford Street, London	1837	Group merged with Debenhams in 1919.	11	1973	
McEwens	Perth	1868	Small group of stores, with branches in Oban and Ballater. Perth store was originally filled with Beales in 2017 before their demise.	3	2016	
Merchant Retail Group	Sunderland		Owner of 6 department stores, 2 of which, Joplings and Robbs, were sold to Owen Owen in 2005.	6		
Midlands Co-operative Society	Derby	1854	Started out as Derby Co-operative Provident Society in 1854.		2013	
Daniel Neal & Sons	Portman Square, London	1837	Children based department stores purchased by the John Lewis Partnership in 1963.	6	1977	
Owen Owen	Liverpool	1868	Group went into administration on 28 February 2007; three stores subsequently acquired by Vergo Retail		2007	
Plummer Roddis	Hastings	1871	Group acquired by Drapery Trust, Renamed Debenhams in 1970s. Southampton store was bought out by the management team but closed in 1993.	11	1973	
Plymouth & South West Co-operative Society	Plymouth	1859	Department stores sold to Vergo Retail	5	2009	
Rackhams	Birmingham	1861	Purchased by Harrods in 1955, which in 1959 was bought by House of Fraser. During the 1970s Rackhams became the group brand name for the Midlands.	10	2000	
Matthias Robinson	Hartlepool	1875	Group acquired by Debenhams in 1962	4	1972	
Peter Robinson	Oxford Circus, London	1883	Group acquired by Burton	39	1970s	
Robinson & Cleaver	Donegall Square, Belfast	1874	Group with branches at Regent Street, London; Bangor, County Down; Liverpool and Bournemouth	5	1984	
Royal Arsenal Co-operative Society (RACS)	Woolwich	1872	Merged with Co-operative Wholesale Society in 1985.	5	1985	
Schofields	Leeds	1901	Group acquired by House of Fraser	3	1986	
Scottish Drapery Corporation		1926	Holding company acquired by House of Fraser	11	1952	
Scottish Midland Co-operative Society	Edinburgh	1981	Formed in by a merger of the Dalziell Society of Motherwell with the St. Cuthbert's Co-operative Society.	20	1990	
Selfridge Provincial Stores	Oxford Street, London	1926	Group created by Selfridges in 1926. Acquired by John Lewis Partnership in 1940. Selfridges flagship department store was not part of this acquisition and was acquired by Lewis's in 1951.	20	1940	
Sheffield Co-operative Society	Sheffield	1868	Merged with United Co-operatives in 2007	3	2008	
Shephards	Gateshead	1908	Small Group based in the North East.	10	1980	
J C Smith & Sons	Nuneaton		Group of 3 department stores acquired by Debenham in 1929.	3	1976	
South Suburban Co-operative Society	Croydon	1918	Merged with Co-operative Wholesale Society in 1984		1984	
Sunwin House	Bradford		Originally known as the Co-op Emporium. Department store operations of United Co-operatives; stores sold to Anglia Regional Co-operative Society and T J Hughes			
United Drapery Stores		1927	Holding company of a number of businesses including department stores. Department store operations merged to form Allders Department Stores during the 1970s. Group was broken up after Hanson plc purchased the business in 1984 and became Allders.		1984	
E Upton and Sons	Teesside	1869	Started life as a grocery store in South Bank, Middlesbrough by Edward Upton, the business grew to three department stores in Middlesbrough, Redcar and Stockton.The business was sold by the family in 2000, and by 2001 the flagship store at Linthoroe Road was closed.	3	2001	
Vergo Retail	Liverpool	2007	Group of department stores including former Owen Owen, Plymouth and South West Co-operative Society and East of England Co-operative Society department stores. Robbs in Hexham sold to J E Beale and all other stores closed.	19	2010	
Watt Brothers	Glasgow	1915	Opened in 1915 in Sauchiehall Street, it opened further stores across Scotland, in Irvine, Lanark, Falkirk, Port Glasgow, Hamilton, Livingston, Clydebank, Clarkston, Robroyston and Ayr. Went into administration in November 2019. Glasgow building was bought by the Easdale Brothers.	11	2019	
Westgate Department Stores	Peterborough	1876	Group of department stores operated by Anglia Regional Co-operative Society; 19 of these stores were sold to J E Beale in 2011, while one was leased to Boyes.	28	2011	
Wildings	Newport	1874	Small group of stores in Wales	14	2019	

== Defunct department stores ==
=== A ===
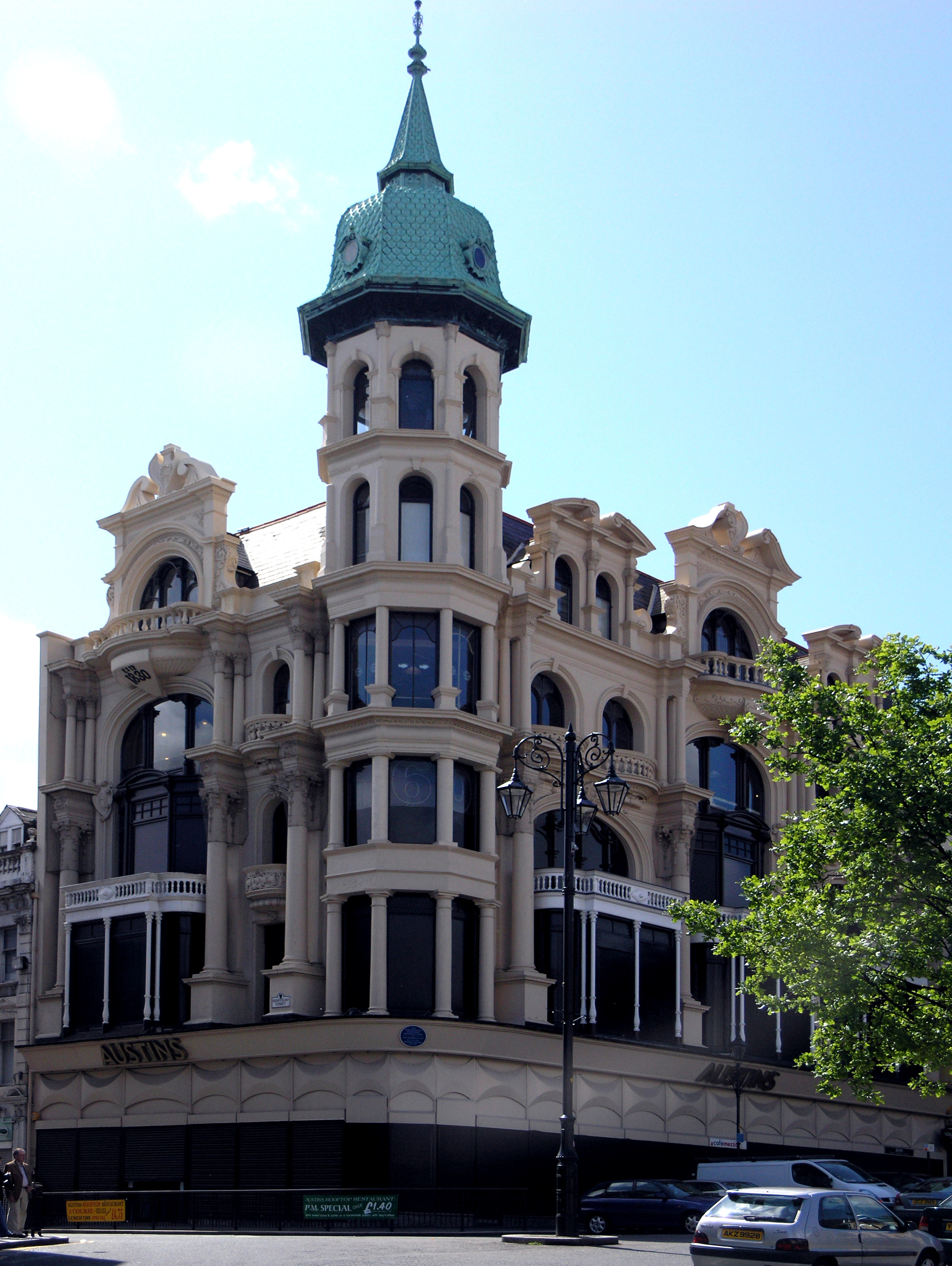
Austin's Department Store in Derry. Went into administration in 2016 (Sean Mack)

Name	Location	Description	Opened	Closed	References
15:17	Ayr	New concept department store opened in former BHS in Ayr, renting space to local businesses. Store opened in Kircaldy, but closed within 5 months. Three further stores opened in Cardiff, Worthing and Canterbury. Issues surrounding ownership and late payments reported in the press.	2019	2021	
Adderlys	Leicester	Based in Market Square; bought by Marshall & Snelgrove 1920s; renamed as Marshall & Snelgrove in 1947.			
Adnitt Brothers	Northampton	Established 1871 in the Drapery; bought by Debenhams in 1952; building rebuilt 1958–62; renamed Debenhams in 1973.	1871	1973	
Affleck & Brown	Manchester	Bought by Debenhams in the 1950s.	c.1860s	1973	
W J Aldiss	Fakenham	Established 1892; department store closed in 2008; W J Aldiss continue to operate home furnishing stores in Fakenham and Norwich.	1892	2008	
J & R Allan	Edinburgh	Bought by Scottish Drapery Corporation and subsequently acquired by House of Fraser; renamed Arnotts in the 1970s.	1897	c.1970s	
Peter Allan	Edinburgh	Bought by Fraser, Sons & Co. in 1940; ownership subsequently transferred to House of Fraser in 1947.			
Allansons	Birkenhead	Established in 1860; bought by Beatties in 1964; renamed Beatties; subsequently acquired by House of Fraser in 2005; renamed House of Fraser.	1860		
Joshua Thomas Allder	Catford		1877		
Allen's	South Shields	Opened as a drapers in 1853 by Robert Newland, in 1896 business was acquired by Thomas Allen. Business was sold to Hedley Young & Co in the 1970s			
Allen Anscombe & Sons Ltd	Harpenden	Opened 1855 by Allen Anscombe. Closed in 1982.	1855	1982	
Almstrongs	Hawick				
Amblers	Skipton	Bought by Brown Muff in August 1961; subsequently acquired by House of Fraser in 1978; renamed Rackhams			
Anderson & McAuley	Belfast	Founded in 1861, Closed in 1994. Other Branches: Bournemouth; Brighton	1861	1994	
Andersons Royal Polytechnic	Glasgow	Established 1837 as Glasgow's first department store. Bought by Lewis's in the 1920s and rebuilt. A new Lewis's department store opened on the site in 1929. Site became a Debenhams.			
Arberys	Wantage		C.1900	1995	
Arding & Hobbs	Battersea	Established 1876; bought by United Drapery Stores; incorporated into Allders Department Stores in 1961; renamed Allders c. 1999; bought by Debenhams; renamed Debenhams.	1876	1999	
Arnolds	Great Yarmouth	Established 1869; bought by Debenhams; renamed Debenhams in 1972; closed in 1985; was located on Junction of Regent Street and King Street.	1869	1972	
Asplands	Hackney, London	Based in Ridley Road. Taken over by London Co-operative Society.			
Atkinson & Co	London	Was based at 198-212 Westminster Bridge Road. Purchased by Thomas Wallis & Co in 1905.		1905	
Attwoods	Kidderminster	Bought by Kay & Co. of Worcester, the catalogue business in the 1950s.			
Austins	Derry	Established in 1830 by Thomas Austin, It was the reputedly the oldest independent department store in the world and one of the oldest in Europe until its closure in 2016. Purchased in 2014 by City Hotel Group.	1830	2016	

=== B ===
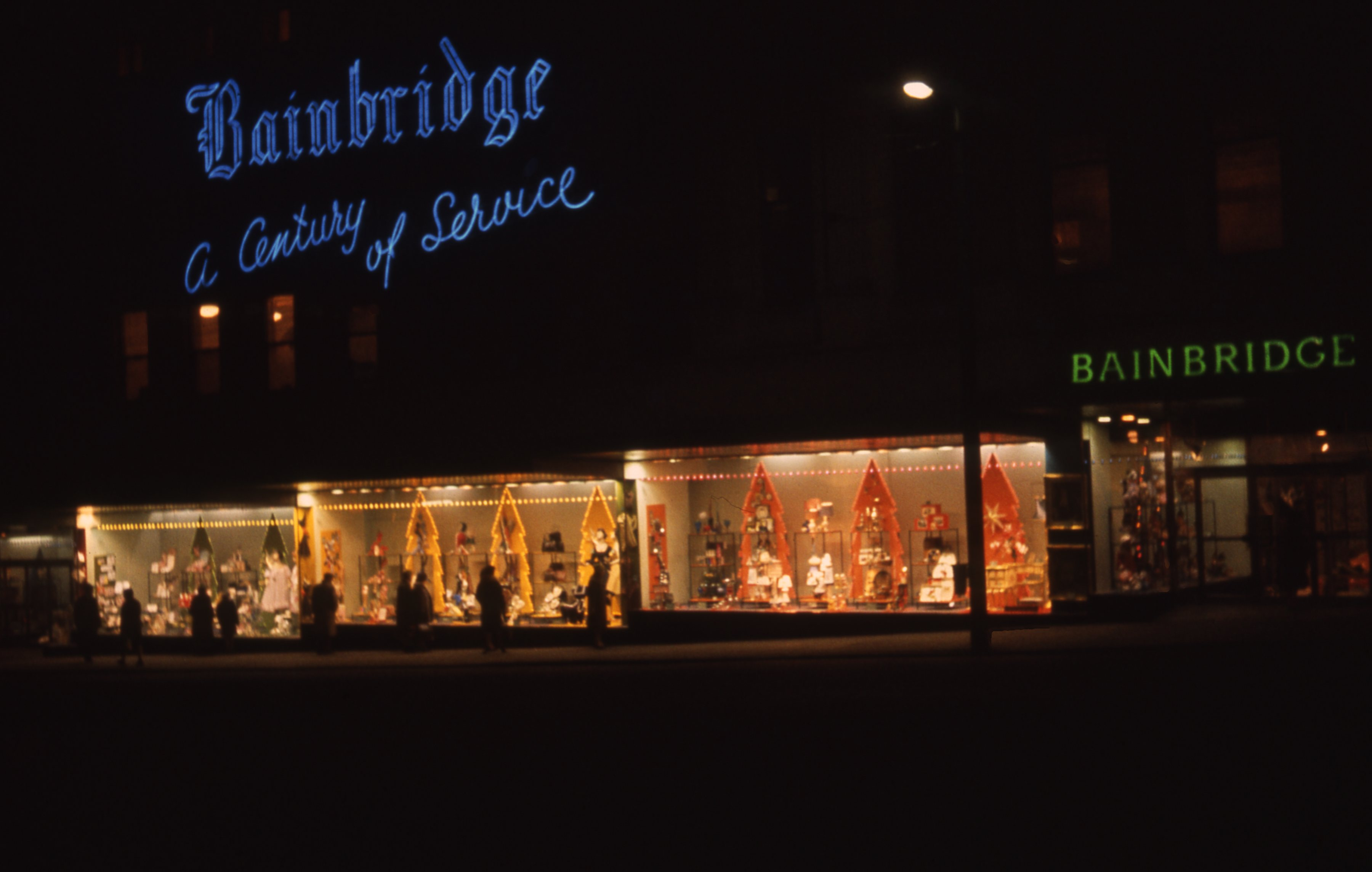
Bainbridge of Newcastle, now John Lewis Newcastle (Tyne & Wear Archives & Museums)

Name	Location	Description	Opening	Closing	References
William Badcock & Son	Newton Abbot	Bought by E Dingle & Co. in the 1960s; subsequently acquired by House of Fraser in 1971.			
Bainbridges	Lincoln	Bought by Great Universal Stores in 1949. Other locations: Wisbech			
Bainbridge & Co.	Newcastle upon Tyne	Bought by John Lewis Partnership in 1952; renamed John Lewis in 2002.	1838	2002	
Bainbridge Barker	Darlington	Sold to Matthias Robinson in 1961.	1899		
Bairds	Hamilton	Opened in 1919 as a branch of T Baird & Sons of Wishaw. The Baird group was purchased by House of Fraser in 1970 with the Hamilton store relocated to a new building later the same year. The Bairds stores, including Hamilton, were renamed Arnotts in 1982. House of Fraser sold the Hamilton store in 1989 to a management buyout led by Murdoch McMaster, after which the store reverted to the Bairds name. In 1993 the Jebrell family saved the business from administration but the store went into liquidation in 2014.	1919	2014	
Baker, Baker & Co.	Bristol	Established in 1840. Purchased by Bell Nicholson & Lunt Group in 1963, the business was sold to Courtaulds in 1966 and the retail business was transferred and renamed McIlroys, the groups department store chain.	1840		
Baldwins	Deal	Succeeded by Laughtons.			
John Banner	Sheffield	Established 1873; relocated to Attercliffe Road in 1894; rebuilt in 1934. Bought by Hurst & Sandler and subsequently acquired by United Drapery Stores; closed in 1980.	1873	1980	
Barbers	Fulham	Closed in the 1980s.	1891		
Barlow & Taylor & Co	Derby				
Barsleys	Paddock Wood		1891	2026	
John Barnes	Finchley Road, London	Bought by Selfridges in 1919; incorporated into Selfridge Provincial Stores in 1926; rebuilt in 1935. Acquired by John Lewis Partnership in 1940; closed in 1981; building subsequently occupied by Waitrose.	1900	1981	
Barrett Brothers	Clapham	Bought by Selfridge Provincial Stores in 1926.			
Barretts	St Neots		1888	2017	
Barretts	Woodbridge,Suffolk		1969	2026	
Barrows	Birmingham	Started by the Cadbury's family, the business eventually became part of Fitch Lovell and merged with its supermarket chain Key Markets.	1794	1973	
A. Barton & Co.	Wood Green	Became part of Hide & Co. Destroyed by fire in 1968.	1907		
Edward Bates	Chatham	Bought by Bentalls in 1979; renamed Bentalls; closed in the 1980s.	1869	1979	
Bearmans	Leytonstone	Established by Frank Bearman, the business once co-owned Allders. The business was sold to London Co-operative in 1962, who continued to run the store under the Bearmans name until its closure in 1982.	1898	1982	
Beavans	Byker	Bought by Great Universal Stores in 1964.	1910		
Joseph Beckett & Co.	Chester	Was located at Eastgate Row. Became part of Brown's of Chester.			
Bedford Williams	Wolverhampton	Based opposite Beatties in Victoria Street before moving to the Mander Centre.			
Beehive	Birmingham	Located in Albert Street.			
Bellmans	Brighton and Hove	Opened in the 1920s after Sydney Bellman purchased the store from the Jacomeli family. The Brighton store located on London Road was demolished and rebuilt as a Fine Fare supermarket Other locations: Hayward Heath; Portslade; Hove; Lewes		1970	
V H Bennett	Weymouth	Bought by Debenhams and incorporated into the Plummer Roddis group; renamed Debenhams in 1973.		1973	
Isaac Benzie	Aberdeen	Bought by House of Fraser; renamed Arnotts	1894	1972	
Benzie & Miller	Fraserburgh	Opened in 1920 as an amalgamation of separate businesses. Purchased by House of Fraser in 1958. Other locations: Inverness (formerly Young & Chapman); Banff (formerly Rankin & Ci); Peterhead (formerly A L Ramsay & Son); Elgin (formerly A L Ramsay & Son)	1920		
Berills	Spalding	Purchased by Mawer & Collingham in 1935 after death of Albert George Berrill. Closed 1971		1971	
Birkheads	Walton-on-Thames	Closed in the 1970s			
Bishops	Falkirk	Based in Kerse Lane.			
Blacketts	Sunderland	Other locations: Barnard Castle; Bishop Auckland; Stockton-on-Tees	1826	1972	
Blacklers	Liverpool			1988	
Bladons	Hull	Bought by Great Universal Stores in 1954			
J D Blair & Co.	Edinburgh	Bought by Scottish Drapery Corporation; subsequently acquired by House of Fraser.			
Blake & Son	Maidstone	Bought by Edward Bates in 1969.	1865	1978	
Blanchards	Infirmary Road, Sheffield	Closed c. 1970s.			
Blands	Wembley	Traded from 1991 to 2017.			
Blinkhorn & Son	Gloucester	Bought by Selfridge Provincial Stores; acquired by John Lewis Partnership in 1940; closed in 1953 and buildings sold to Woolworths. Other location: Stroud			
Blooms	Salisbury				
Blundell Brothers	Luton	Established in 1852 at Market Hill; relocated to the new Arndale Centre in 1972; bought by Debenhams and renamed as such in 1977. Other location: St Albans (Succeeded Fisk & Son in 1946 as a branch of Blundell Brothers; closed in 1966; demolished to make way for Heritage Close shopping precinct.)	1852	1977	
John Blundell	Newcastle upon Tyne	Former Howards store rebranded by UDS.			
John Blundell	Ipswich	On site of former E Brand store (possible rebrand by United Drapery Stores) Opened 1956. Refurbished 1977.			
John Blundell	Bristol				
Blyths	Edinburgh				
Boardmans	Stratford	Bought by Keddies in the 1970s; closed in 1984 and building demolished		1984	
Bobby & Co.	Margate	Other locations: Clifton (Succeeded John Cordeux & Sons as a branch of Bobby & Co. (Drapery Trust) in 1928; closed in 1932 and premises sold to Brights.); Leamington Spa; Folkestone (formerly C J Saunders; purchased 1906); Eastbourne (formerly Atkinson & Co., trading as Strange & Atkinson; purchased 1910); Torquay (formerly Robert Thomas Knight; expanded 1921 with the purchase of Iredales); Bournemouth (opened 1915 on the site of Hugh King; later extended); Exeter (formerly Green & Son, acquired 1922); Southport	1887	1972	
Bodgers	Ilford	Opened 14 June 1890; bought by Morleys in 1959; closed 28 February 2018.	1890	2018	
Bolingbroke & Wenley	Chelmsford	Established 1846; department store closed in April 2000 and the building was subsequently demolished. A WH Smith and H&M store opened on the site in 2001.	1846	2000	
Bonanza	Glasgow				
Bonds	Chelmsford	Started by John Bond, brother of Robert Bond, founder of Bonds of Norwich. Moved to current location in 1870; bought by Debenhams in the 1960s; renamed Debenhams in 1973.		1973	
Bonds	Norwich	Bought by John Lewis Partnership in 1982; renamed John Lewis in 2001.	1879	2001	
Bon Marché	Brixton	Established in 1877 by James Smith of Tooting. The store was the first purpose-built department store in London. Smith named his department store after the Au Bon Marche in Paris. Bought by Selfridge Provincial Stores in 1926 and subsequently acquired by John Lewis Partnership in 1940.	1877	1975	
Bon Marché	Gloucester	Started by John Rowe Pope on Northgate Street, the business was bought by the Drapery Trust in the late 1920s from the Pope family.	1889	1971	
Bon Marché	Liverpool	Established 1877 by Lewis's; bought by Liverpool Co-Operative Society in the late 1950s before acquisition by John Lewis Partnership in 1961; incorporated into George Henry Lee.	1877		
Bon Marché	Southsea		1927	2009	
Bon Marché	Tunbridge Wells	Bought by John Lewis Partnership in 1946; renamed The Silk Shop; closed in 1953 and premises sold to John Perris of Croydon	1878		
Boothroyds	Southport	Bought by Broadbents of Southport; acquired by Owen Owen and merged with Broadbents to form Broadbents & Boothroyds on the Boothroyds site.			
Boswells of Oxford	Oxford		1738	2020	
Frederick Boulton	Cirencester	Acquired by House of Fraser in 1975; renamed Rackhams in 1977; renamed House of Fraser c. 2000	1881	1977	
Boulton & Talbot	Stafford	Later Boultons; succeeded by Brookfields 1865	1743		
Bourne & Hollingsworth	Oxford Street, London	Other locations: Southampton (Sold in 1979 & became Bournes)		1983	
Bournes	Southampton	Succeeded Bourne & Hollingsworth 1979.	1979	1983	
Bow's Emporium	Glasgow	Established by William Bow. Purchased by Wylie Hill & Co in 1947	1873		
Bradley's Drapery Stores	Oswestry	Became part of Hide & Co			
E Braggins & Sons	Bedford	Opened by Ezra Braggins in 1885. The family sold the business in 1968 to a local stationery, Lonsdale & Bartholomew who ran the store until 1982, selling the company to Beales	1885		
Brakes	Taunton				
E. Brand & Sons	Ipswich	Closed in the 1950s (possibly purchased by United Drapery Stores as became a John Blundell store)	1875		
Brand and Norman	Belfast	Located in Castle Lane, it closed in 1983.	1920		
Bratt & Dyke	Hanley	Closed in the late 1980s. Other locations: Stafford	1890		
Bratts and Evans	Northwich	Other locations: Nantwich; Knutsford	1860		
Brays	Malvern		1895	2019	
Brice & Sons	Northampton	Bought by Selfridge Provincial Stores			
Brindleys	Derby				
Brights	Bournemouth	Bought by J J Allen in 1960. Acquired by House of Fraser in 1969; renamed Dingles in 1973; renamed House of Fraser in the 2000s.: Clifton (Opened in the former premises of Bobby & Co. as a branch of Brights 1932. Acquired by J J Allen 1960. Subsequently, acquired by House of Fraser 1969; renamed Dingles 1973; closed 1990s.)	1871	1973	
Brightwells	Southend-on-Sea				
Bristol Guild of Applied Art	Bristol	Known as Bristol Guild or The Guild. Located on Park Street. Closed 30 May 2024.	1908	2024	
Broadbents	Southport	Bought by Owen Owen; merged with Boothroyds of Southport to form Broadbents & Boothroyds on the Boothroyds site; Broadbents premises sold.			
Broadbents & Boothroyds	Southport	Formed from the merger of Broadbents and Boothroyds, by Owen Owen, on the Boothroyds site; bought by J E Beale; renamed Beales.			
Brookfields	Stafford	Succeeded Boultons.		1909	
Browns of Chester	Chester	Founded by Susannah Brown, the store was once called the Harrods of the North. Was purchased by Debenhams in 1976.	1780	2021	
D G Brown	Harrogate				
D M Brown	Dundee	Bought by Scottish Drapery Corporation; acquired by House of Fraser; renamed Arnotts 1970s; closed 2002.			
J B Brown	Clayton Square, Liverpool	Purchased by Canadian and English Stores Ltd in 1962.		1970	
Brown & Philips	Deal		1938	2003	
John Bryants & Sons	St Ives	Bought by Eaden Lilley 2003; renamed Eaden Lilley. Bought from the receiver of Eaden Lilley by C J Townrow & Sons 2009; renamed Townrow.	1887	2003	
W J Buckley & Co.	Harrogate	Bought by Selfridge Provincial Stores and subsequently acquired by the John Lewis Partnership in 1940. The store was sold to Busbys of Bradford in 1953 who rebranded the store under the Busbys name. Busbys was itself purchased by Debenhams in 1958. The store was renamed Debenhams in 1973 and continued to trade from the same site until Debenhams' closure in 2021.		1953	
A H Bull	Reading	Bought by Selfridge Provincial Stores. Acquired by John Lewis Partnership 1940; closed 1953; incorporated into Heelas.		1953	
Bulloughs	Carlisle	Bought by Hoopers 2006; renamed Hoopers 2006; closed 2013		2006	
Bunneys	Liverpool	Bought By Greenwoods of Bradford in 1956 before being demolished. Other location: Mostyn Street, Llandudno	1881		
Buntings	Norwich	Came under the control of fellow Norwich store Chamberlins. Building was damaged during World War II. Was purchased by Debenhams in 1949.	1860		
T Burberry & Sons	Basingstoke	Also known as The Emporium; succeeded by E Lanham & Son. Originally owned by Thomas Burberry and eventually part of the business grew to become luxury British fashion house Burberry. The store was sold to was sold to Edgar Lanham in 1914, before being purchased by Thomas Wallis in 1964.		1915	
Burgess	Tottenham	Opened 19th century, new building built on the site of Sanchez Almshouses in 1923; closed 1980 replaced by Tottenham Enterprise Centre.			
Burgis & Colbourne	Leamington Spa	Bought by Army & Navy Stores 1963; renamed Army & Navy 1974. Acquired by House of Fraser 1976; renamed Rackhams; renamed House of Fraser c. 2000			
Burnes	Ilford	Bought by Chiesmans 1959; acquired by House of Fraser 1972; later incorporated into the Army & Navy group			
T G Burrell	Chester				
Joseph Burton	Nottingham				
Busbys	Bradford	Bought by Debenhams 1958; renamed Debenhams 1973; closed 1978 Other locations: Ilkley; Harrogate	1908	1973	
C B Butcher	Hawkhurst				
Butlers	Poole	Became part of the Co-Op			
B T Butter	Weston-super-Mare	Bought by James Colmer. Acquired by Owen Owen 1973; renamed Owen Owen.			
Butterfield and Massies	Barnsley	Owned by Great Universal Stores.			

=== C ===
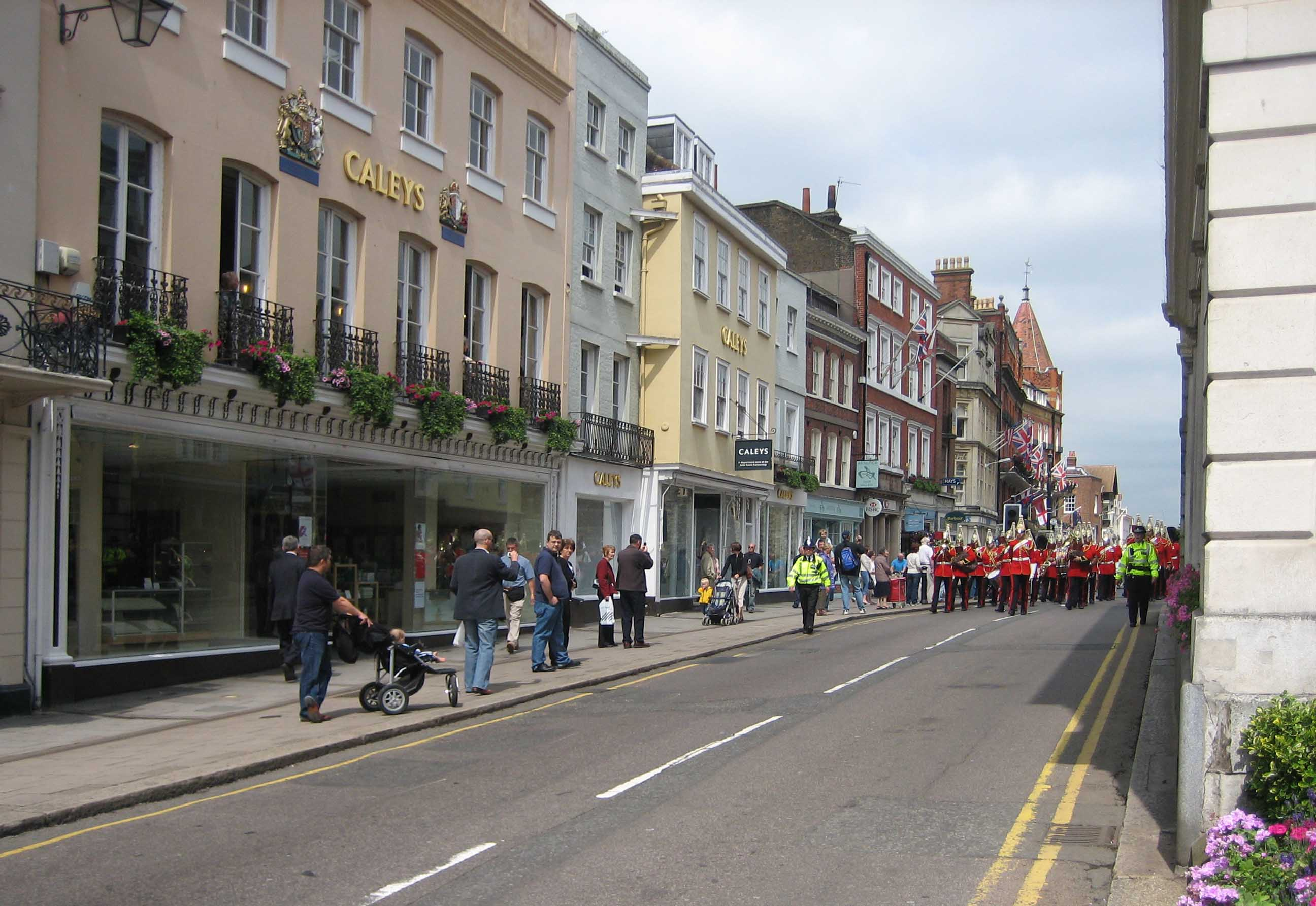
Caleys was established in 1810. It closed in 2006 as part of the John Lewis Partnership. (Pamela Marson)

Name	Location	Description	Opening	Closing	References
Caleys	Windsor	Established in 1810. Bought by Selfridge Provincial Stores in 1918. Acquired by John Lewis Partnership 1940; closed 2006.	1810	2006	
J T Calvert	Sunderland	Bought by Hedley, Swan & Co., owners of Joplings in 1921; Calverts closed and Joplings relocated to the site.		1921	
Cammack & Son	Boston, Lincolnshire				
J. & W. Campbell & Co	Glasgow	Classed as one of Britain's first department stores, the retail and wholesaler warehousemen as they were called, closed their retail business in 1841 continuing as wholesalers.	1817	1841	
Campbell & Booker	Walton-on-Thames	Chain of department stores started by Booker Group. Succeeded by Grant Warden. Other locations: Richmond; Ilford; Horsham (operated as Chart & Lawrence)			
F Cape & Co.	Oxford	Established circa 1860s at St Ebbes as a drapers by Faithful Cape. The store expanded to a department store under the management of Henry Lewis, moving to 86-90 Cowley Road in 1900. The business closed in 1972 due to competitionfrom multiples. Buildings demolished. Site occupied by Fenwick c. 1978 – c. 1990.	c.1860s	1972	
Carltons	Bridlington	Succeeded Norman Jones & Co. in 1918. Bought by Hammonds in 1968; renamed Hammonds on completion of new building in 1970.	1918	1970	
Carmichaels	Hull	Closed in 1991		1991	
Catesbys	Tottenham Court Road, London	Established in 1865; incorporated in 1910; closed in 1958	1865	1958	
Cavendish House	Cheltenham	Opened in 1823. Became part of House of Fraser in 1970.	1823		
Cawdells	Watford				
Chadds	Hereford	Established in 1929; closed on 7 June 2008. Building now partly occupied by The Entertainer (2014)			
Chadds	Lowestoft	Established in 1907. Bought by Palmers in 2004; renamed Palmers in 2009.			
Chamberlins Ltd	Norwich	Opened in 1815 by Henry Chamberlain. Was located on corner of Dove Street and Guildhall Hall, and the site became a Tesco Metro. The business controlled fellow Norwich department store Buntings. The business was purchased by Debenhams in 1949, with Chamberlins being given to Marshall & Snelgrove. Also operated a large manufacturing business.	1815	c.1950s	
W & A Chapman	Taunton	Bought by Debenhams; renamed Debenhams			
Chart & Lawrence	Horsham	Bought by Campbell & Booker in 1969 after retirement of the Lawrence family.			
Chattels of Dereham	Dereham	Opened in April 2015; closed November in 2018; formerly Palmers (1989-2015) / Nicholas Hinde & Sons (1982-1989) / Bonds (1961-1982) / Cluttens	2015	2018	
Chirnsides	Lancaster				
Chopes / W H Chope & Sons	Bideford	Opened in 1898	1898		
City Drapery Stores	Oxford	Established in 1884. Succeeded by Webbers in 1905	1884	1905	
Civil Service & Professional Supply	Glasgow				
Civil Service Supply Association	Strand, London		1865	1982	
Edward J Clarke	Harrogate	Bought by McDonalds of Glasgow in 1922; renamed McDonalds in 1922. Acquired by House of Fraser in 1951; later incorporated into the Binns group; renamed Binns			
Thomas Clarkson & Sons	Wolverhampton	Established in 1840. Bought by Army & Navy Stores in 1960; renamed Army & Navy in 1974. Acquired by House of Fraser in 1976; renamed Rackhams	1840	1974	
Clements	Watford	Established in 1898; closed in 2004	1898	2004	
Clements & Brown	Taunton	Bought by James Colmer. Acquired by Owen Owen in 1973; renamed Owen Owen			
Clegg	Wilmslow	Walter Shields Clegg opened the store on the corner of Hawthorn Lane and Church Street. Became part of Macowards in 1947.	1881		
Clover	Kirkstall	Purchased by Allders			
Walter Cobb	Sydenham		1860	1961	
Cobb & Son	Stroud				
Robert Cochran & Son	Paisley, Renfrewshire	Purchased by House of Fraser in 1964, renamed Arnotts in the 1970s		c.1970s	
T B & W Cockayne	Sheffield	Established in 1829. Bought by Schofields in 1972; renamed Schofields; closed in 1982	1829	1972	
Cole Brothers	Sheffield	Bought by Selfridge Provincial Stores in 1927. Acquired by John Lewis Partnership in 1940; renamed John Lewis in 2002.		2002	
Colliers Stores	Liverpool	Was located in Pembroke Place. Purchased by Macowards in 1964.			
Colsons	Exeter	Established in 1792. Traded as Colson & Spark between 1829 and 1832; Colson & Gates between 1870 and 1889; Colson & Co. between 1889 and 1925. Bought by Brights in 1925; renamed Colsons of Exeter in 1925. Acquired by J J Allen in 1960. Subsequently, acquired by House of Fraser in 1969; renamed Dingles in 1973; renamed House of Fraser in 2000s.	1792	1973	
Compton House	Liverpool	Built for retailer J.R.Jeffery in 1865; closed in 1871. Compton House holds a unique international status as a contender for the world's first department store, pre-dating Bon Marche in Paris by some five years. Building converted to a hotel in 1873 and part of the building has been occupied by Marks & Spencer since 1928	1865	1873	
James Cock	Burslem	Became part of the Macowards store group.			
F W Cook	Dudley	Started by Samuel Cook, who opened a drapery in 1818 operating under the name of Dudley House. His son Samuel Quartus Cook joined in 1844 and the store became known as S. Cook & Son. The business was purchased by Alderman F. W. Cook in 1884. The business closed on the 26 April 1983 after 164 years of trading	1818	1983	
J W Coombs	Northwich	Located in Witton Street. Was purchased by Macowards in 1956. At some point the store was sold to London-based Warren Stores who closed the business in 1969.		1969	
G R Cooper	Oxford	Bought by Selfridges in 1966. Original store demolished in 1973 for new store as part of Westgate development			
Copland & Lye	Glasgow	Incorporated in 1918; closed in 1970; building purchased by House of Fraser in 1971	1873	1970	
Robert Corbett & Son	Portadown	Closed in the 1970s.	1876	c.1970s	
Frederick Corder & Sons	Ipswich	Bought by Debenhams; incorporated into Footman Pretty on completion of new building	1787		.
Corders	Norwich				
John Cordeux & Sons	Clifton	Bought by Drapery Trust; incorporated into the Bobby & Co. group in 1928; renamed Bobby's in 1928; closed in 1932.		1928	
Cox & Horder	Falmouth	Bought by E Dingle & Co. in 1961			
Cox & Painter	Great Malvern		1833		
James Coxon & Co.	Newcastle upon Tyne	Bought by Binns in 1929			
Coxs	Burslem				
Cresta House	Harrogate	Opened by Debenhams as a branch of Cresta House in premises previously occupied by the Harrogate branch of Marshall & Snelgrove. Bought by Schofields; renamed Schofields. Acquired by House of Fraser; closed. Building now occupied by Hoopers (2015)			
Peter Crisp	Rushden		1959	2009	
Cuffs	Woolwich		1891	1975	
Curl Brothers	Norwich	Bought by Footman, Pretty & Co in 1920s; renamed Debenhams in 1973	1860	1973	

=== D ===
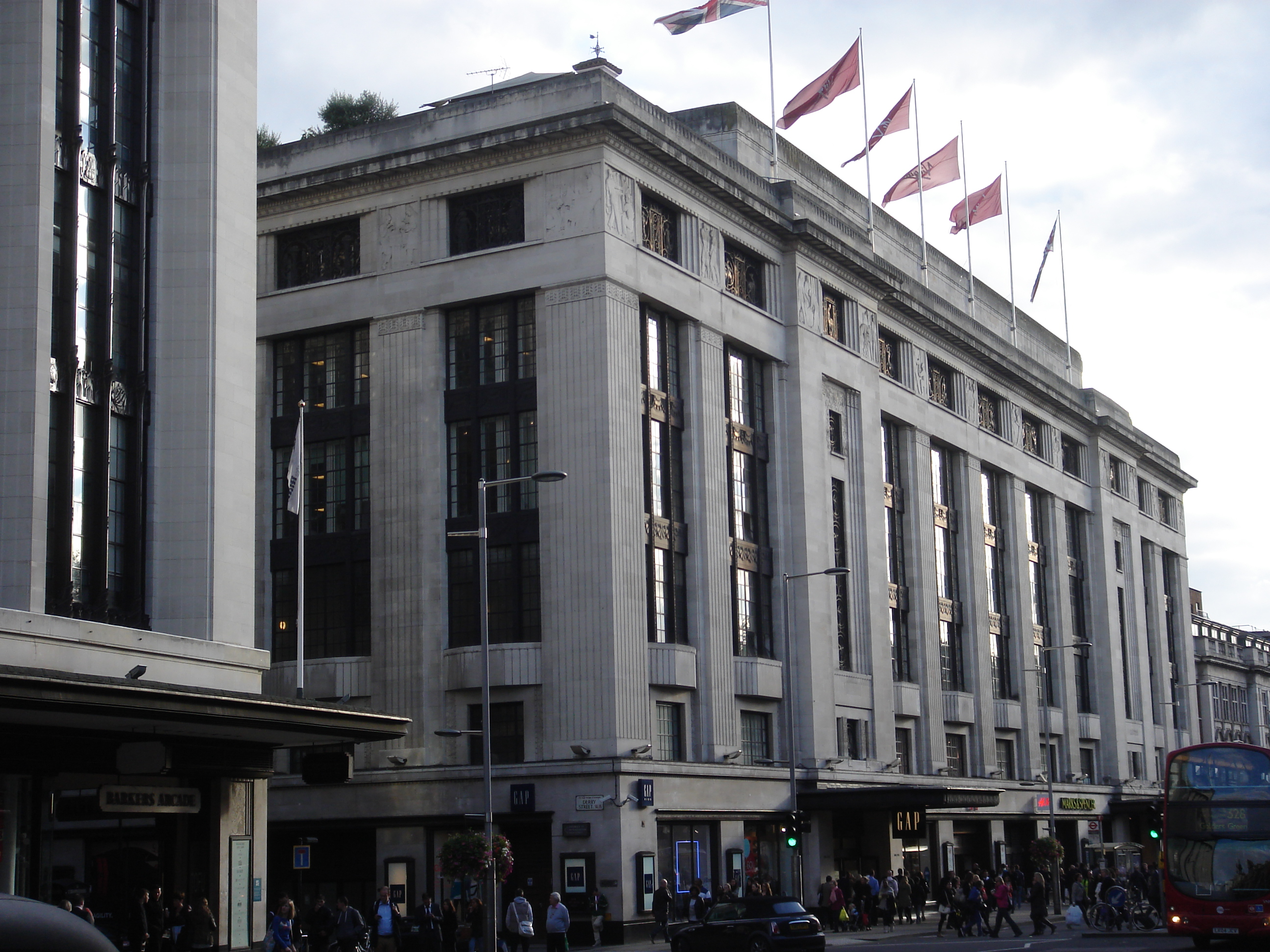
Derry & Tom's was in between the other two Kensington department stores, Barkers and Pontings, closed in 1971. (Edwardx)

Name	Location	Description	Opened	Closed	References
Dabbles	Newport			2012	
Dale	Edmonton Green		c. 1880		
Dale & Kerley	Eastbourne	Bought by John Barker & Co.; acquired by House of Fraser 1957; incorporated into the Army & Navy group c. 1976; renamed Army & Navy c. 1976; closed 1997. Building was occupied by T J Hughes until 2019			
Dallas's Colosseum	Glasgow	Succeeded Walter Wilson & Co. 1938; bought by Fraser, Sons & Co. 1942; Ownership transferred to House of Fraser 1947.			
Dalys	Glasgow			1979	
Darling & Co.	Edinburgh	Purchased by Great Universal Stores in 1955. Bought by House of Fraser from Great Universal Stores in January 1961; closed. Located at 124-125 Princes Street.			
G. L. Davies t/a The Emporium	Bargoed	Became a founding member of the Macowards group in 1937. Renamed Macowards; was first Macowards store to include a food hall run by Maypole Dairies. Was sold to Mr F A Jones in 1968 and returned to operating as The Emporium.			
Edwin Davis	Hull				
W A Dawsons Ltd	Herne Bay				
Dawson Brothers	Hoxton	Bought by Drapery Trust; ownership subsequently transferred to Debenhams in 1970s; sold; Closed. Buildings demolished 1980s. Located at City Road / East Road junction.	1848		
Dawson & Co	Sidcup	Became part of Macowards, the store was rebranded under Macoward's Oxford Street store Thomas Wallis.			
Joseph Della Porta	Shrewsbury	Bought by Hide & Co.; acquired by House of Fraser 1975; renamed Rackhams 1975; renamed House of Fraser 2000s			
Denners	Yeovil	Bought by Beales.			
J F Densons	Chester	Located at 11–13 Northgate Street since 1900, the store was purchased by Macowards in 1954.			
Derrys	Plymouth	Bought by Vergo Retail in 2009.	1950	2010	
Derry & Toms	Kensington	Bought by John Barker & Co. 1920; acquired by House of Fraser 1957; closed 1973			
Dickins & Jones	Regent Street, London	Became part of Harrods group, before being taken over by House of Fraser.	1790	2007	
Dickson & Benson	Middlesbrough	Based Linthorpe Road. Burnt down in 1942 in an arsonist attack.	1880		
George Dixon & Jameson	Dorchester	Succeeded Steele 1889; succeeded by Genge & Co. 1899.			
J F Dixons	Southend-on-Sea		1913	1973	
Dobbins	Manchester				
Dodwells	Cheltenham				
Draffens	Dundee	Opened by William Moon and John Langlands; in 1889 business was bought by Coatbridge draper George Draffen and his brother-in-law John Jarvie, with the business known as Draffen & Jarvie, which it continued to be known after Jarvie left the business in 1891. The business renamed to Draffens of Dundee in 1948. In 1960 the company went public and left the Draffen family ownership. Bought by Debenham in 1981.	1834		
Drakes	Cheltenham				
Driscolls	Hove	Succeeded by Stuart Norris.	1920		
Z Dudley	Kingsland	Bought by Drapery Trust.			
T C Dunning & Son	Maidstone	Bought by Hide & Co.; acquired by House of Fraser 1975; incorporated into the Army & Navy group c. 1976; renamed Army & Navy c. 1976			
Dupont	Penge				
Dusts	Tunbridge Wells	Bought by Debenhams; incorporated into the Bobby & Co. group.			

=== E ===
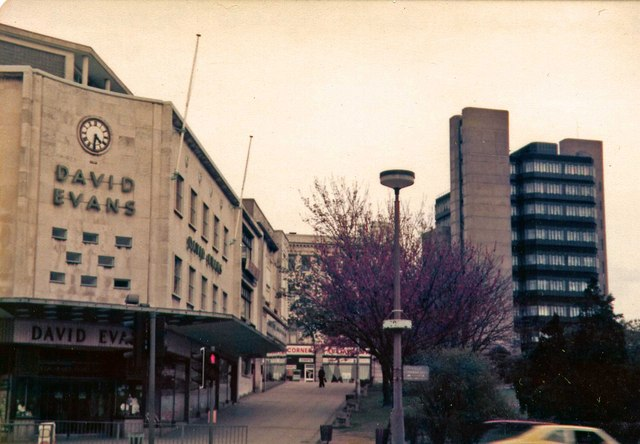
David Evans in Swansea in 1979 (Brian Whittle)

Name	Location	Description	Opened	Closed	References
Frank East	Tonbridge				
Eastmonds	Tiverton	Bought by Banburys of Barnstaple 1989; renamed Banburys.		1989	
Edmunds	Wood Green, London				
Elliston & Cavell	Oxford	Bought by Debenhams and renamed Debenhams in 1973.	1835	1973	
Empire Trade Stamp Co.	Sheffield	Based 18-23 Howard Street.			
Ennals & Co.	Walsall				
Esslemont & Macintosh	Aberdeen		1873	2007	
Ben Evans	Swansea	Established 1800s; became a subsidiary of Leslie Stores, Cardiff, before Leslirs were purchased by Great Universal Stores; closed c. 1950s.			
Benjamin Beadmore Evans	Kilburn	The business was sold to Thomas Wallis & Co in 1949, the business was purchased by Littlewoods in 1953 before being sold to Howardsgate Holdings, the retail arm of Allied Bakeries in 1955. The business was sold to Harrow Stores in 1959, who were bought by Tesco in 1961, and they sold the business to Canadian and English Stores in 1962 for £200,000; closed 1971. Other locations: Holloway (former North London Drapery Stores rebranded by Northgate and English Stores); Kentish Town (formerly London Drapery Stores)	1897	1971	
Dan Evans	Barry	Closed 28 January 2006.	1909	2006	
David Evans	Swansea	Bought by House of Fraser 1977 flagship store closed in 2005. Other locations: Cwmbran (Opened as a branch of David Evans in 1961. Acquired by House of Fraser 1977; renamed House of Fraser in 2009 as the last David Evans store); Port Talbot (Opened in 1948); Cardiff	1900	2009	
D H Evans	Oxford Street, London		1879	2001	
Evans & Davies	Palmers Green		1920	1980	
Evans & Owen	Bath			1974	
Henry Evenden	Eastbourne	Succeeded Terry & Evenden.			
Alexander Ewing & Co.	Dundee	Bought by Fraser, Sons & Co. 1941; ownership transferred to House of Fraser 1947			

=== F ===
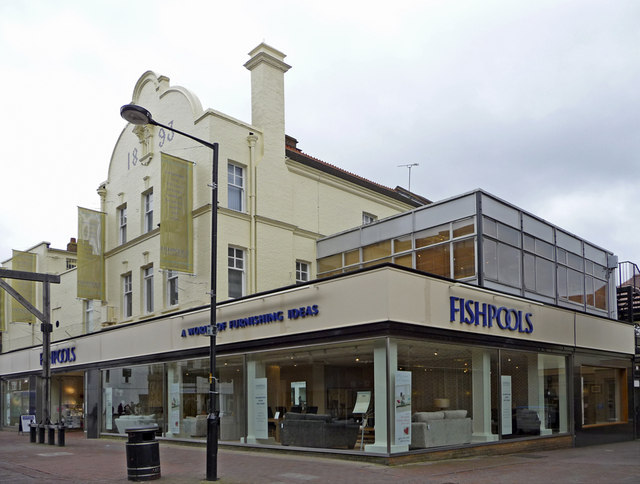
Fishpools in Waltham Cross (Christine Matthews)

Name	Location	Description	Opened	Closed	References
G J Fairhead	llford		1873	2008	
John Falconer & Co.	Aberdeen	Bought by Scottish Drapery Corporation 1929. Acquired by House of Fraser 1952; renamed Frasers 1970s; closed 2002.			
Fantos	Deptford				
John Farnon	Newcastle upon Tyne	Bought by United Drapery Stores in 1958.	1867	c. 1995	
Fear Hill	Trowbridge	Acquired by House of Fraser; renamed Dingles; closed Other locations: Frome; Wells			
Finnigans	Wilmslow (previously Manchester)	Relocated from Manchester city centre to Wilmslow c. 1960s. Bought by Hoopers 1982; renamed Hoopers 1982.		1982	
Fife Department Store	Kirkcaldy	Former Debenhams Store reopened as independent after failed 15:17 venture.	2021	2022	
Frederick Fish & Son	Ipswich				
Fishpools	Waltham Cross	Now a furniture only store.	1899		
W M Fisk & Son	St Albans	Established c. 1829–1839. Succeeded by Blundells 1946.		1946	
Floyd & Sons	Minehead	Bought by J E Beale in 1978 and renamed Bealesons, closed 1982.	1877	1978	
Footman, Pretty and Company	Ipswich	Bought by Drapery Trust; incorporated with Frederick Corders and both moved to new Debenhams store built on site of old Footman's store. The company had a controlling interest in Norwich store Curl Brothers. Other location: Woodbridge; Harwich	1834		
Ford's	Oakham		1877	2019	
R W Forsyth	Glasgow	Relocated to former Trerons building 1983; building destroyed by fire 1986. Other location: Edinburgh (Opened in 1907 & closed in the 1970s)	1872	1986	
Fowler & Brock	South Shields	Bought by Binns in 1927 and acquired by House of Fraser in 1953.			
E Francis & Sons	Leamington Spa		1840	1983	
Frasier's	Southampton				
Clement Freeman & Son (Freemans)	Liverpool	Located in Waverly Road. Rebuilt in 1964. Other location: County Road, Liverpool		1974	.
Frosts	Liverpool	Opened as a drapers by Thomas Frost during the 1885 in Walton Road. By 1910 the business operated out of all the stores in the block. Around 1918 the new building was constructed to house Frost department store. Building now a Weatherspoons pub			

=== G ===
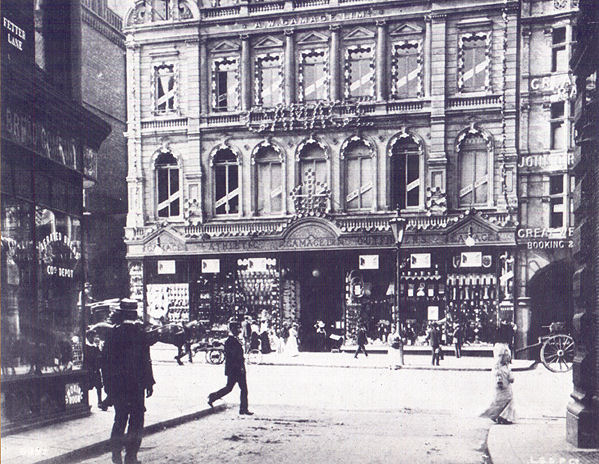
Gamages

Name	Location	Description	Opened	Closed	References
A W Gamage	Holborn, London	Other locations: Oxford Street, London (Opened as new flagship store of the brand in 1930. Closed 8 months later. Lease sold to C & A.); Romford (Opened in Liberty Shopping Centre in 1968. Sold to British Home Stores in 1971.)	1878	1972	
Gamis's	Yeovil	Established by Ince Gamis as 'perfumer, hairdresser and toy dealer' and traded successively as Ince Gamis, Gamis & Hunt, Gamis & Co. and Gamis's. The business came to be owned by House of Fraser in the 1970s (possibly through a larger acquisition?) and was renamed Dingles before closing in the 1980s. The premises were bought by Denners.	1828		
Gammons	Guildford	Small family run department store based in Surrey and Kent. Other locations: Woking; Chobham; Cranbook; Cranleigh	1878		
Gardiner's	London	Based in Whitechapel, destroyed by fire in 1972.			
Gardiner Haskins	Bristol	Opened 1825 as a blacksmiths. Now a Home wares business.			
Garlands	Norwich	Located on London Street. Bought by Debenhams. A fire in 1970 destroyed the building and its neighbouring department store Buntings. The building was rebuilt but the store closed in 1984.		1984	
Garatts	Woolwich			1972	
Gayler & Pope	Marylebone				)
Genge & Co.	Dorchester	Succeeded George Dixon & Jameson 1899. Bought by Army & Navy Stores 1953. Acquired by House of Fraser 1976; renamed Dingles; closed 1980s.			
Gimbles	Liverpool	Owned by Gimbels and based on Great Charlotte Street. The reason that the store had an altered spelling from the American chain is not known.	1976	1979	
Glass's	Peterborough				
Henry Glave	New Oxford Street, London	Established 1848; bought by Sir Arthur Wheeler, 1st Baronet, purchased United Drapery Stores; Wheeler was declared bankrupt in 1931; closed 1936	1848	1936	
Godfreys	Lowestoft			2015	
Goldbergs	Glasgow				
Goodbans	Chiswick		1909	1974	
Frederick Gorringe	Buckingham Palace Road, London	Established 1858; bought by Gresham Trust and Charles Neale Investments in 1961; rebuilt 1960s; went into administration 1968.	1858	1968	
Gosling & Sons	Richmond	Bought by John Barker & Co. in 1947 then acquired by House of Fraser ten years later in 1957 and closed in 1968. Reopened as Dickins & Jones on completion of the new building in 1970. Renamed House of Fraser in 2007, HOF closed their store in 2020.	1795	1968	
Bryce Grant	Penge	Opened in 1922 at Central Exchange, merged business with P. D. Rodgers store, before being bought by Walter Cobb. Store was closed in the 1950s business operated by H. E. Olby and Erdington.	1922		
Grant Brothers	Croydon	Latterly of 14–32 High Street, Croydon.	1877	1985	
Grant Warden	Walton-on-Thames	Formerly Campbell & Booker. Bought by J E Beale; renamed Beales.			
Gravesons	Hertford	Succeeded Graveson & Robinson in 1899.	1899	2001	
Gray peverell	Hartlepool	Bought by Binns in 1926.	1902	1992	
Green & Son	Exeter	Bought by Bobby & Co in 1922.		1922	
W S Green	St. Albans	Bought by Army & Navy Stores.			
Greenlands	Hereford	Opened by George Greenland. Further stores opened but in 1968 the business was sold to Marks & Spencer for £350,000.	1856		
Edward Grey	Birmingham	Bought by Debenhams. Other locations: Dudley; Leamington Spa; Stourbridge; Walsall; Willenhall; Worcester			
Grices	Leicester	Succeeded by Rudkin Turner.			
Griffin & Spalding	Nottingham	Bought by Debenhams in 1944; renamed Debenhams.			
Grocott & Co.	Shrewsbury	Bought by Hide & Co before the end of World War II; closed mid 1960s.			
Grose Brothers	Southwark				
Gunners	Tonbridge	Demolished in 1984.			
Guy & Smith	Grimsby	Bought by House of Fraser 1969; incorporated into the Binns group; renamed Binns 1969; renamed House of Fraser 2000s			

=== H ===
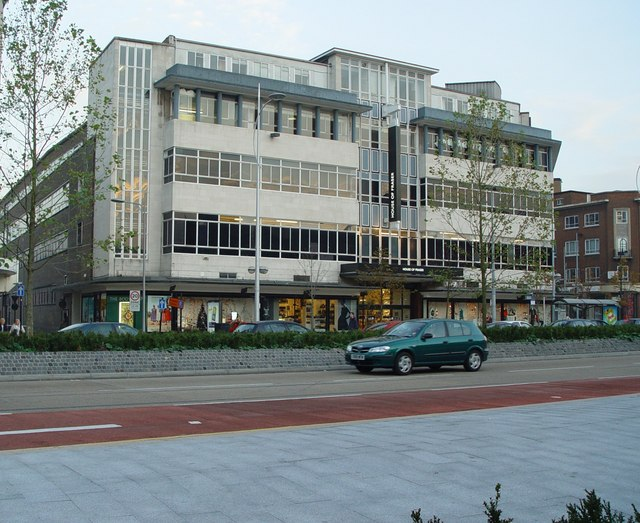
Hammonds in Hull (Peter Church)

Name	Location	Description	Opened	Closed	References
Samuel Hall	Cardiff	Located at 8-10 High Street. Bought by Macowards in 1951.			
Philip Hall	Ripon		1950	2012	
Hamilton & Bell	Cross Gates, Leeds				
Hamilton & Bell	Evesham	Purchased by Owen Owen in 1975			
Hammonds	Hull	Bought by House of Fraser 1972; incorporated into the Binns group; renamed Binns 1972; renamed Hammonds; renamed House of Fraser; closed 2019 Other location: Bridlington (Formerly Carltons. Opened as Hammonds on completion of new building 1970. Subsequently, acquired by House of Fraser 1972; renamed Binns; closed c. 1995. Premises bought by Boyes and reopened in 1998.)			
Hancock & Wood	Warrington	Opened by Frederick Samuel Hancock, the store in Bridge Street survived the Warrington bombings in 1993. The store was closed by Christopher Hancock, grandson of the founder.	1914	2026	
Handleys	Southsea	Bought by Drapery Trust; incorporated into the Bobby & Co. group; renamed Debenhams 1970s.	1869		
Hanningtons	Brighton				
Harper Brothers	Balham				
T J Harries	Oxford Street, London	Purchased by John Lewis in 1928	c. 1885-1887		
Harrison Gibson	Illford	Other location: Bromley (Bought by Army & Navy Stores 1968; renamed Army & Navy. Acquired by House of Fraser 1976; closed 2004. North building now occupied by T K Maxx (2015). South building demolished and site vacant (2015).)		2010	
H & D Hart	Leeds	Bought by Matthias Robinson 1938; incorporated into Matthias Robinson Leeds store (now Debenhams)			
William Harvey	Guildford	Bought by Army & Navy Stores 1953. Acquired by House of Fraser 1976; renamed Army & Navy; renamed House of Fraser.			
Harwoods	Strood				
George Hatton	Dover				
George Henry Havelock	Sunderland	Destroyed by fire 18 July 1898; rebuilt 1900; closed 1914. Building converted to cinema.		1914	
Havens	Westcliff on Sea	Closed in 2017 becoming an online only retailer.	1901	2017	
Hawes Brothers	Clapham Junction	One of the founding members of United Drapery Stores. Other location: Morden			
Hawke & Thomas	Newquay	Bought by E Dingle & Co. 1960s			
Hawkins	Hitchin		1863	2017	
Haymans	Totnes	Bought by Debenhams; incorporated into the Bobby & Co. group			
Sidney Heath	Swansea				
Heddles	Dartford				
Hedley Mitchell	Erith	Demolished in 1966.	1890	1961	
Hedley, Swan & Co.	Sunderland	1882–1919, renamed Joplings store when purchased by Stephen Moriarty Swan and Robert Hedley. Renamed Joplings when moved to High Street West in 1919.			
Heelas & Sons Co.	Reading	Established 1854. Bought by Charles Clore 1947; sold to United Drapery Stores 1950. Bought by John Lewis Partnership 1953; business of A H Bull incorporated into Heelas 1953; renamed John Lewis 2001.	1854		
Alexander Henderson	Glasgow	Bought by House of Fraser from Selincourt & Sons of London 1970; closed 1970, enabling the relocation of Pettigrew & Stephens to the site, in the same year.			
William Henderson & Sons	Liverpool	Bought by Harrods 1949; acquired by House of Fraser 1959; renamed Binns 1975; closed 1977.	1829		
Edwin Henley	Shepton Mallet	Bought by Fear Hill.			
Henry's Stores	Manchester	Opened by Henry Cohen, a Russian immigrant, as clothing stores before his son, Leonard Cohen opened the department store in 1923. Purchased by British Home Stores in 1968. Other locations: Birmingham; Stockport (located at 28-30 Princes Street, formerly a cinema before being replaced by a Victor Value supermarket)			
H L Herbert & Co.	Kilburn				
Herbet Lewis	Chepstow		1878	2018	
Heywoods	Huddersfield	Destroyed by fire on 2 November 1967			
Heyworths	Cambridge			1965	
Albert Hide & Son	Bexleyheath	Buildings replaced by Broadway Shopping Centre.	1851	1979	
D Hill, Carter & Company	Hartlepool	Formerly Carter & Co.; merged with D Hill & Co. 1898; bought by Blacketts 1940s Other location: North Shields			
William Hill (Hills)	Hove	Bought by Debenhams; incorporated into the Bobby & Co. group; closed 1982			
R H O Hills	Blackpool	Bought by Hide & Co. 1965. Acquired by House of Fraser 1975; incorporated into the Binns group; renamed Binns; closed.			
George Hilton & Sons	Haywards Heath	Main buildings demolished and site redeveloped as Orchards Shopping Centre. Former furniture building now occupied by Robert Dyas (2015).	1882	c.1980s	
Hinds	Eltham	One of the founding members of United Drapery Stores.			
George Hitchcock Williams & Co.	St Paul's Churchyard, London		1841	1984	
M C Hitchen & Son	Leeds	Sold to Littlewoods in 1952			
Hoadleys	Burgess Hill		1857	1983	
Holdrons	Peckham	Bought by Selfridge Provincial Stores. Acquired by John Lewis Partnership 1940; sold 1948.			
Hopewells	Nottingham				
Houndsditch Warehouse	Houndsditch, London	Purchased by Great Universal Stores in 1958.		1986	
David Hourston & Sons	Ayr	Purchased by House of Fraser 1949; Rebranded Arnotts; Sold in 1989 to a management buyout led by Murdoch McMaster; Bought by Jebreel family out of administration in 1993 and Rebranded Hourstons; Closed 2019.	1897		
Howards	Newcastle upon Tyne	Bought by United Drapery Stores; later incorporated into the John Blundell group; renamed John Blundell.			
Harding Howell and Company's Grand Fashionable Magazine	Pall Mall, London		1809	1820	
James Howell & Co.	Cardiff	Bought by House of Fraser 1972.			
John K Hubbard	Worthing	Bought by Debenhams; incorporated into the Bobby & Co. group; renamed Debenhams 1973			
T P Hughes	Tenby	Closed as a department store but continues as a homewares store Other locations: Carmarthen (opened in 1932 closed in 1987.); Haverfordwest (Opened in 1922)	1903	2017	
Hulburds	Herne Bay and Sittingbourne				
W H Hunt & Co.	Kensington	Located at 197–207 Kensington High Street.	1889	1923	
Huntbachs	Hanley				
Hunt Brothers	Borsham				

=== J ===
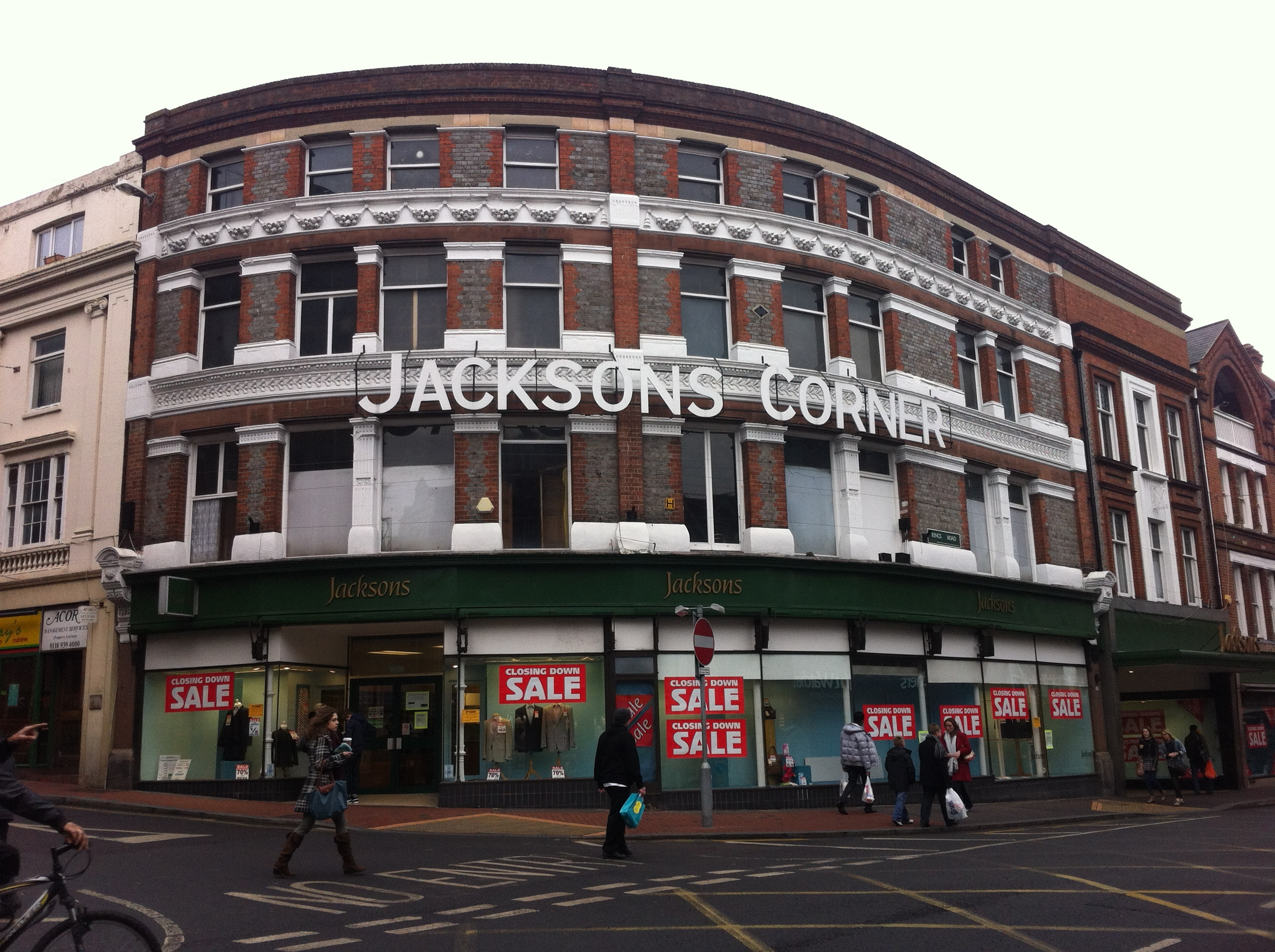
E. Jackson in Reading, known as Jackson's Corner (Hotlorp)

Name	Location	Description	Opened	Closed	References
E Jackson & Sons	Reading		1875	2013	
V H Jarvis	Aylesbury	Became part of the Combined English Stores group through its subsidiary Harry Fenton.		1980	
W C Jay & Co (trading as The London General Mourning Warehouse, known as Jay's Mourning Warehouse)	Regent Street, London	Opened by William Chickall Jay. The store was rebuilt to designs by Sir Henry Tanner in 1925. The store was bought by Great Universal Stores in 1946.	1841		
Jenners	Edinburgh	Founded by Charles Jenner, the Princes Street store was regarded as the premier store in Scotland. Was purchased by House of Fraser in 2000.	1838	2020	
Jennings	Bexleyheath				
Jermyns	Kings Lynn	Bought by Debenhams in 1943.	1872	1973	
Jessop & Son	Nottingham				
Joseph Johnson	Leicester	Acquired by Fenwick in 1962 and renamed Fenwick.	1880		
Johnson & Clark	Staines	Redeveloped in 1956. Closed mid 1980s.		Mid 1980s	
Jones	Bristol	Bought by Drapery Trust and renamed Debenhams in 1972.	1843	1972	
B J Jones	Lampeter		1921	2006	
Edwin Jones	Southampton	Bought by Debenhams; renamed Debenhams			
Richard Jones	Chester				
Thomas Jones	Middlesbrough	Bought by Binns 1923; renamed Binns; acquired by House of Fraser 1953; renamed House of Fraser c. 2007.			
Norman Jones & Co.	Bridlington	Succeeded Makins & Bean. Bought by Mr. R. H. Carlton 1911; renamed Carltons 1918.		1918	
Jones & Higgins	Peckham	Acquired by Great Universal Stores in 1954; closed 1980. Re-opened as the Houndsditch before closing in 1984 and being demolished and replaced by Aylesham Centre.	1867		
Jones & Jones	Swansea				
Jones Brother	Holloway	Founded by William Jones, bought by Selfridge Provincial Stores in 1927. Acquired by John Lewis Partnership in 1940; closed 1990.	1869		
Joplings	Sunderland			2010	
Jordans	Lisson Grove, London				
Joseph Johnson & Co	Leicester	Bought by Fenwicks in 1962.	1880		
Joyes	Grays			1975	

=== K ===
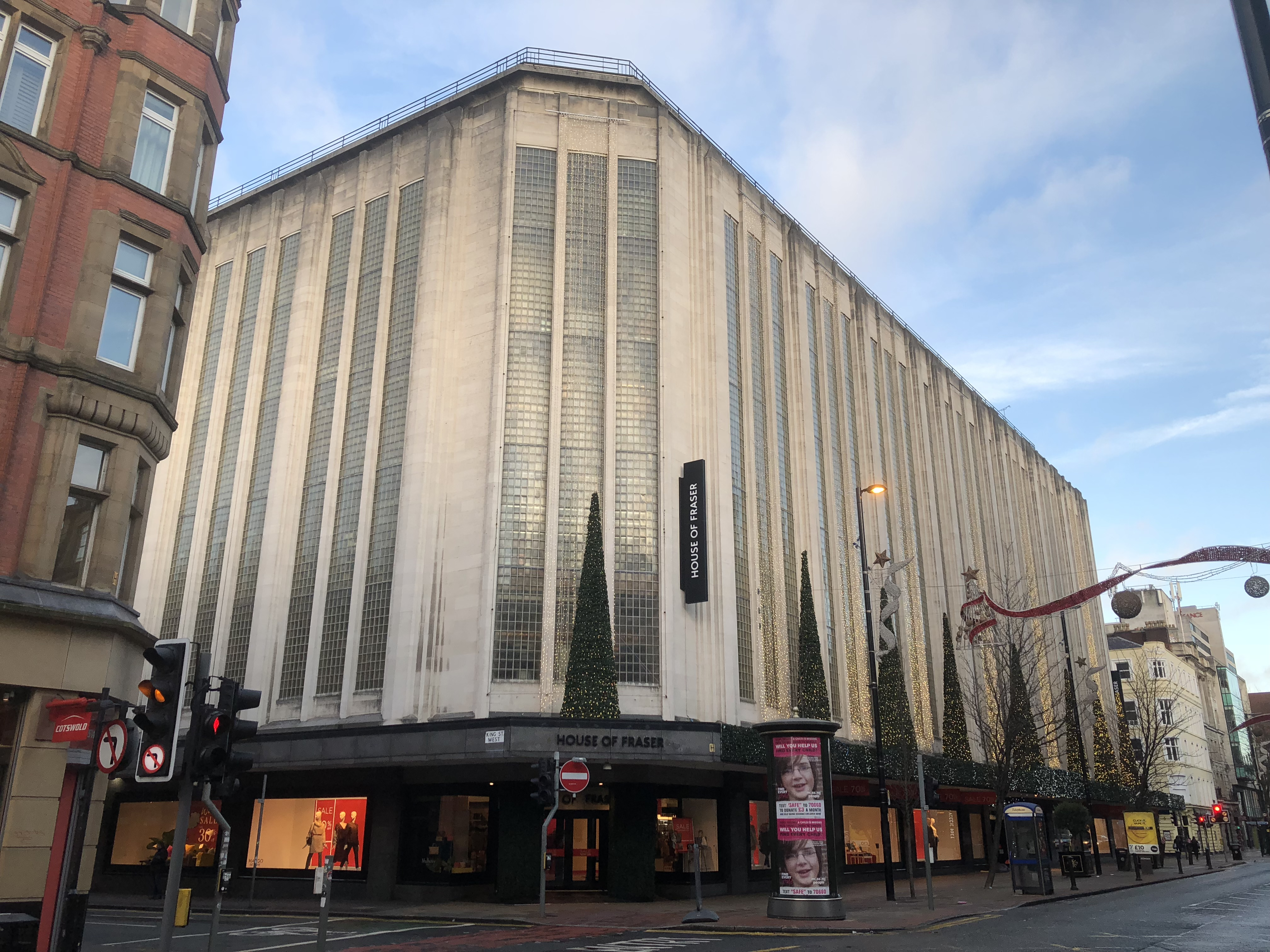
Kendals, Manchester(KJP1)

Name	Location	Description	Opened	Closed	References
Kayes	Huddersfield				
Keddies	Southend-on-Sea	Other locations: Colchester; Romford; Stratford, London (formerly Boardmans; closed 1984; building demolished)	1892	1996	
H E Keightley & Son	Boston, Lincolnshire	Became part of the Macowards group. Other locations: Spalding; Skegness; Wisbech			
Kendals	Manchester	Founded in 1836 as Kendal, Milne & Faulkner, the store was bought by Harrods in 1919 and renamed to Harrods but after protests it was renamed back to Kendal Milne. The store was taken over by House of Fraser in 1959 and then renamed to House of Fraser in 2005.	1836	2005	
Kendalls	Malvern	Bought by Macowards 1962.	1852		
Kennards	Croydon	Bought by Drapery Trust; rebranded to Debenhams in 1973. Other locations: Redhill; Staines (Renamed Debenhams in 1973)	1853	1973	
Kennards	Wimbledon	Bought by Macowards in 1951			
Kerfoots	Porthmadog		1878	2018	
John T Killip	Wembley				
Kirby & Nicholson	York				
H J Knee	Trowbridge	H J Knee continue to trade in Trowbridge, as 'Knees Home & Electrical', from a new site.	1879	2013	
Knight & Wakefield	Brighton				
John Knights	Redruth	Department store with branches in Helston and St. Ives.			

=== L ===
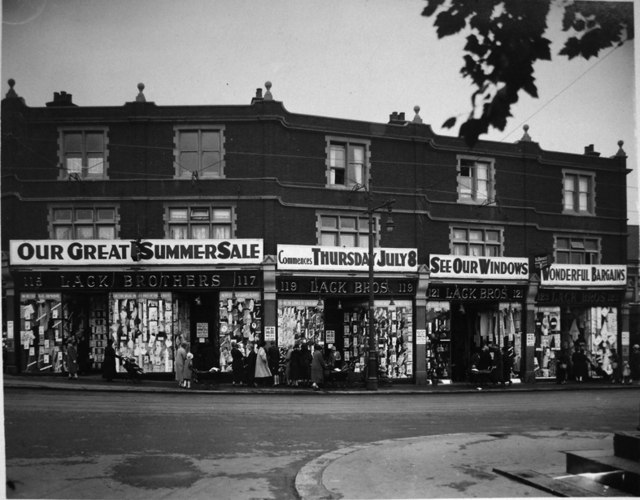
Lack Brothers store in Thornton Heath, Croydon

Name	Location	Description	Opened	Closed	References
Lack Brothers	Thornton Heath		1898	1937	
Lance & Lance	Weston-super-Mare	Bought by John Lewis Partnership in 1933, the business never recovered from damage done to the store in WW2, and the store closed in early 1956.	Early 1890s	1956	
The Landmark	Harrow	Opened in November 2021 replacing the Debenhams store in Harrow,	2021	2023	
Landport Drapery Bazaar	Portsmouth		1870	1982	
Lanhams / E Lanham & Son	Basingstoke	Started after the purchase of the store and warehouse of T Burberry & Sons by Edgar Lanham. The warehouse was sold to Marks & Spencer in 1934. The store was sold onto Macowards in 1964 and converted to their brand Thomas Wallis.	1915	1964	
H. Lauder & Co.	Kilmarnock	Opened by Hugh Lauder and James Brown, with the premises being destroyed by fire in 1923 and was rebuilt between 1927 and 1932.The business was acquired by House of Fraser in 1972	1864	1972	
Laughtons	Deal	Succeeded Baldwins; closed 2008		2008	
Laure & McConnal	Cambridge		1883	1970s	
Lawson & Stockdale	Grimsby	Demolished and replaced by Marks & Spencer		1983	
W. A. Lea & Sons	Leicester				
Leak & Thorp	York	Opened 11 March 1848 by William Leak on Parliament Street, before moving to Conley Street in 1869. In 1908, William Collins on joined the business, working his way up to chairman, with the family running the business until the 1980s. The store was destroyed by fire in 1933, but was rebuilt by the following year.	1848		
Leaveys	Chatham				
Legends and Wynn	Skipton				
George Henry Lee	Liverpool	Bought by Selfridge Provincial Stores; acquired by John Lewis Partnership in 1940. Other location: Chester			
Stanley J Lee	Edgware				
William Lefevre	Canterbury	Bought by Drapery Trust; renamed Debenhams		1973	
Leonards	Rochester	Bought by Chiesmans 1959.			
Lermons	Cardiff	Became founding member of Macowards store group in 1937.			
Leslies	Cardiff				
Lewis & Godfrey	Stroud				
Herbet Lewis	Chepstow		1878	2018	
John Lewis	Upton Park	Bought by Chiesmans and renamed Chiesmans; House of Fraser acquired the Chiesmans group and later renamed the store Army & Navy.		1988	
John Lewis	Wimbledon	Bought by Kennards and renamed Kennards; Debenhams acquired the Kennards stores and closed the Wimbledon branch			
Lewis Lewis	Swansea	Opened 1860 in High Street, Swansea. Opened further stores in Briton Ferry, Neath and Llanelli. Closed 1966.	1860	1966	
Lidstones	Walthamstow	Opened by James Lidstone after purchasing the drapery business of Thomas Brailey, and by 1899 he had started buying further shops in St James Street. In the 1930s, 2 of the shops were sold to Montague Burton, with the remaining stores being sold to the London Co-operative Society in 1946, two years before his death.			
Lingards	Bradford	Originally Sunbridge Road.Bought by United Drapery Stores; New store opened The mall, Westgate. Both stores closed by UDS on 23 April 1977.			
Loder & Payne	Maidstone				
London Drapery Stores	Kentish Town	Purchased by Canadian & English Stores, renamed B. B. Evans.			
Longley Brothers	Bexhill-on-Sea				
Longleys	Aylesbury				
Frederick Lord Bon Marche	Grimsby				
Lowes	Wigan	Bought by Greenwood's in 1963; closed 1985.	1887		
Richard Luck & Co	Darlington			1966	
A J Lucking & Co.	Colchester				
Lyttons	Ruislip	Purchased by John Sanders of Ealing in 1985. Renamed John Sanders.			

=== M ===
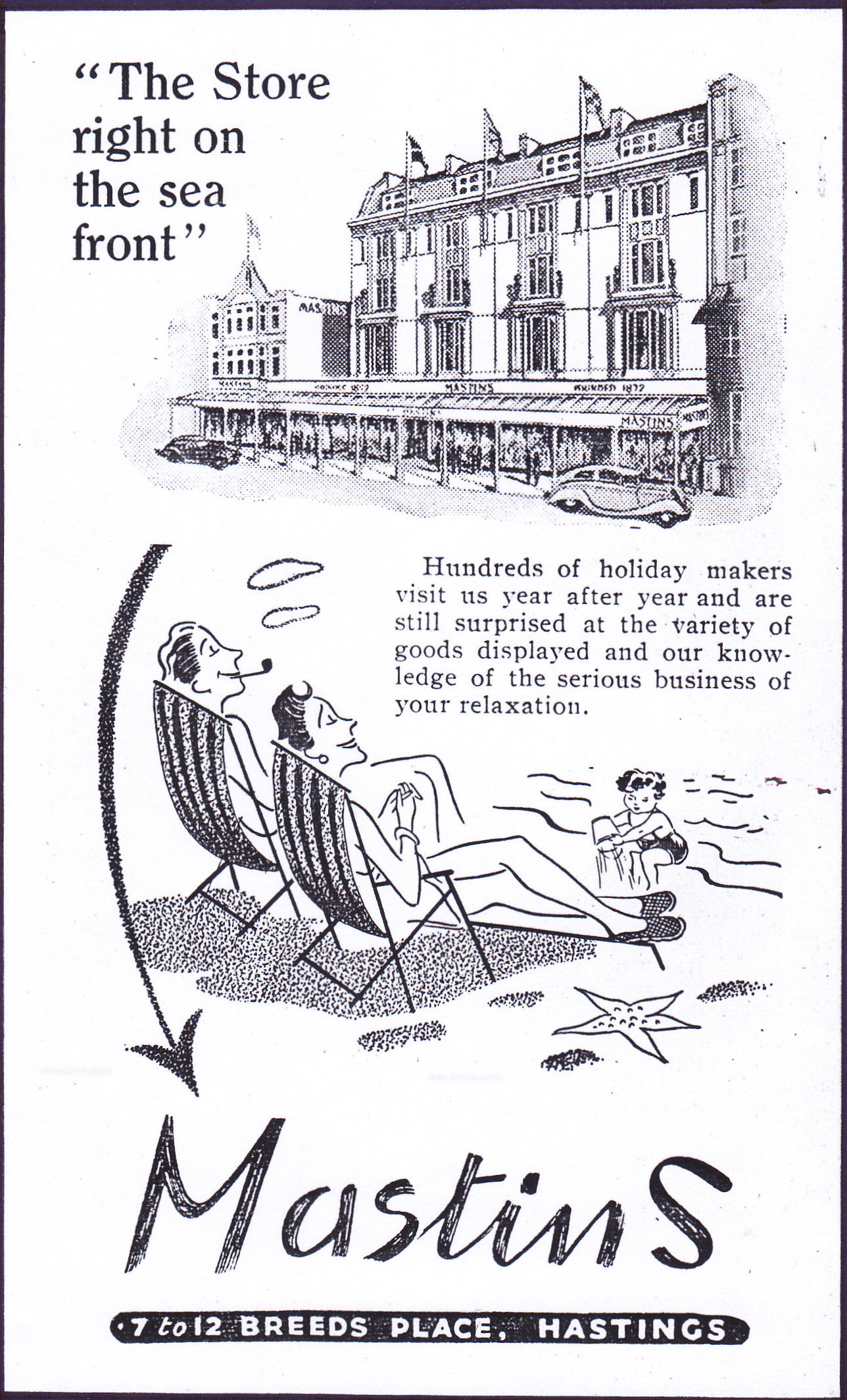
Advertisement for Mastin Brothers, Hastings (Phil Sellens)

- McDonalds (Glasgow) Formerly part of retail and manufacturing business, Stewart & McDonald, the retail business was separated as McDonalds in 1913. In 1922 they purchased the drapery business of E J Clark in Harrogate. The business was bought by House of Fraser in 1951. It was merged with Wylie & Lochhead and together renamed McDonalds, Wylie & Lochhead 1957; renamed Frasers 1975
- McDonalds, Wylie & Lochhead (Glasgow) – formed from the merger of McDonalds and Wylie & Lochhead by House of Fraser 1957; renamed Frasers 1975.
- McGill Brothers (Dundee)
- McIlroy Brothers (Hanley) – established 1883; later McIlroys. Bought by Lewis's 1935; renamed Lewis's
- Duncan McLaren (Edinburgh) Opened on the Royal Mile by Duncan McLaren in 1824, regarded as one of Britain's first department stores and in Edinburgh rivalled Jenners.
- Mackross (Cardiff)
- Macowards (Swansea) Became a founding member of the Macowards group in 1937.
- Maddox & Co (Shrewsbury) – established in the 1850s by R Maddox. Bought by Macowards; Bought by Owen Owen in 1976; renamed Owen Owen; closed c. 1990
- Maggs (Clifton)
- Makins & Bean (Bridlington) – established c. 1880s; succeeded by Norman Jones & Co.
- David Mann & Sons (Manns of Cranleigh) (Cranleigh) opened in 1887; Closed 2021.
- Marments (Cardiff) – established 1879; closed 1986
- T. C. Marsh & Co (Bristol)
- Marshalls of York (York) former Debenhams store purchased by Irvine Sellar in 1980 along with 27 Cresta Fashion stores, with the department store being rebranded as Marshalls of York.
- Marshall Roberts (Camden Town)
- Martins (Canterbury) bought by Chiesmans
- Maskreys (Whiteladies Road, Bristol) – closed 2012
- Masons & Son (Ipswich)
- Mastin Brothers (Hastings) - established 1872. Closed 1969.
- Matthew & Son (Cambridge)
- Frederick Matthews (Preston) – bought by Owen Owen; renamed Owen Owen
- Robert Maule & Son (Edinburgh) – established 1894. Bought by Binns 1934; renamed Binns. Acquired by House of Fraser 1953; renamed Frasers.
- Maw Till Kirke (Hull) – closed 1938; building occupied by municipal offices since 1942
- Mawer & Collingham (Lincoln) – bought by House of Fraser 1980; incorporated into the Binns group; renamed Binns c. 1980; renamed House of Fraser c.2005
- E Mayes & Son (Southampton) – bought by Owen Owen; renamed Owen Owen
- Medhursts (Bromley) – established 1879 by Fred Medhurst; bought by United Drapery Stores 1969; renamed Allders 1979
- Charles Meeking & Co (Holborn, London) became Albert Brown & Sons in 1884.
- Midland Drapery Company (Derby) – established 1882; purchased by Macowards in 1951; closed 1969
- C. N. Mitcham (Cambridge)
- Mogridges Torquay Closed early 1970s.
- Monteith, Hamilton & Monteith (Leeds) – established 1885, trading as 'Grand Pygmalion'; closed 1927
- J D Morant (Chichester; previously Southsea) – Established 1910; Southsea premises destroyed by bombing 1941; relocated to Chichester 1941. Bought by Army & Navy Stores 1955; renamed Army & Navy. Acquired by House of Fraser 1976; renamed House of Fraser 2007.
- David Morgan (Cardiff) – established 1879; closed 29 January 2005
- John Morgan & Son (Marlow) – bought by William McIlroy
- J T Morgan (Swansea)
- Morgan Squire (Leicester) – bought by J J Allen 1962; acquired by House of Fraser 1969; renamed Rackhams c. 1976; closed 1980s
- Morgans (Ramsgate)
- Morgans (West Penwith) – bought by James Colmer 1963; closed 1970s
  - Morgans (Bristol) – opened in the 1930s; bought by James Colmer in 1963
- Morris (Newport, Isle of Wight) – Formerly Edward Morris. Bought by Chiesmans 1958.
- Mortons (Faringdon)
- Moulton (Ilford) purchases by R H O Hills 1959; 1962 purchased by Lewis' for £730,000; renamed Selfridges; closed.
- J.W.Muntus (Rotherham)
- Murfitts (Hounslow)
- Murrays (High Wycombe) – Closed 1985.
- Henry A Murton (Newcastle upon Tyne)
- Musgroves (Kendal) Opened in 1860. Became part of J R Taylor, before being purchased by Beales.

=== N ===
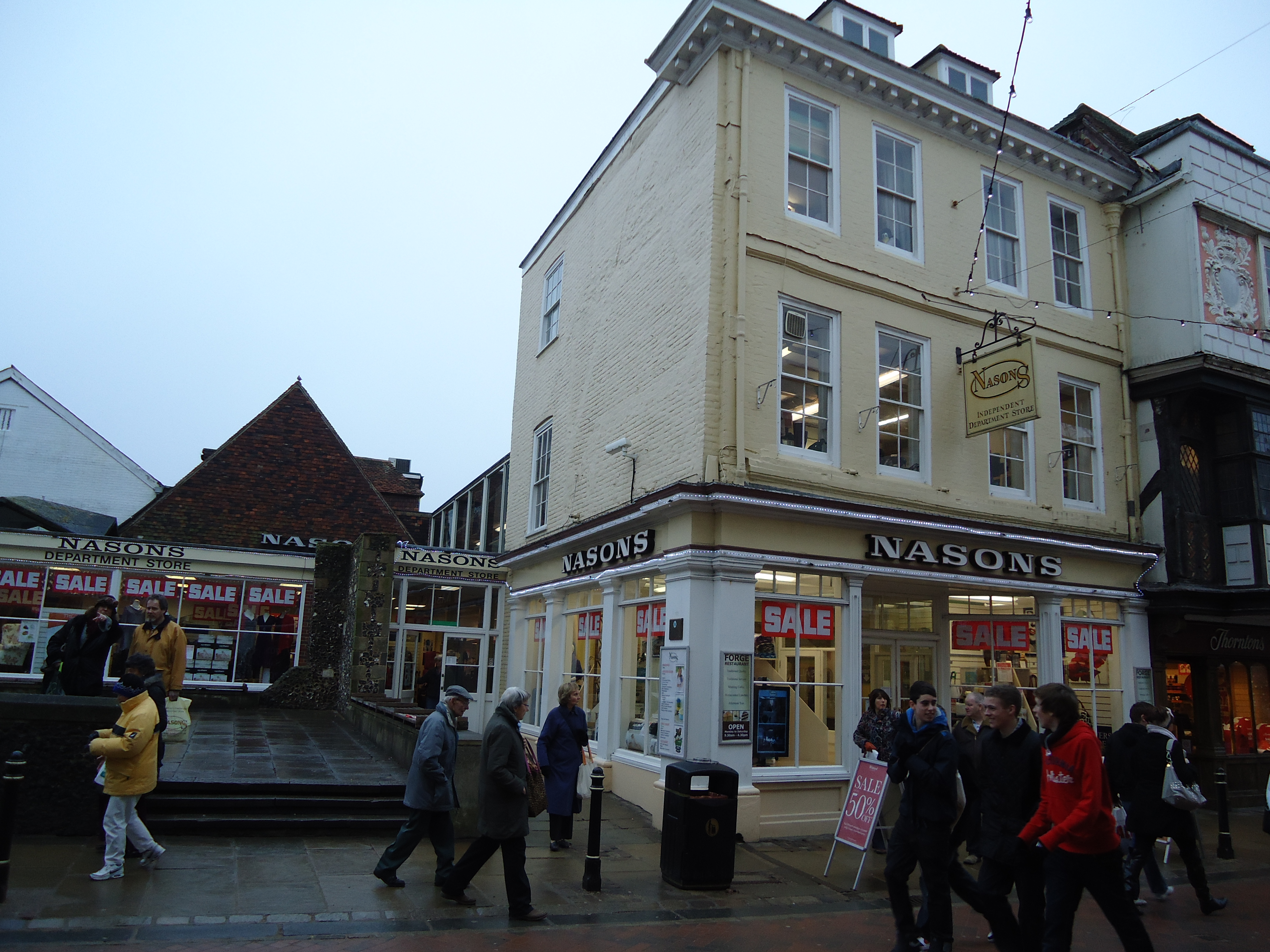
Nasons, Canterbury - closed in 2018 (Stacey Harris)

Name	Location	Description	Opened	Closed	References
Nasons	Canterbury		1929	2018	
Needham & Sons	Brighton	Bought by Selfridge Provincial Stores. Store demolished 1930.			
Newburys	Birmingham	Bought by Lewis's 1920s; incorporated into Lewis's Birmingham.			
Joseph Newhouse	Middlesbrough	Bought by Debenhams; renamed Debenhams.			
R Nichol & Sons	Redhill				
Nicholsons	Bromley; previously St Paul's Churchyard, London	Bought by Debenhams; St Paul's Churchyard buildings destroyed by bombing; relocated to former cinema building in Bromley; renamed Debenhams 1973; closed 1990s.			
Noakes	Tunbridge Wells		1851	2009	
Norco House	Aberdeen				
Stuart Norris	Hove	Succeeded Driscolls. Bought by Hide & Co. 1957. Acquired by House of Fraser 1975; renamed Chiesmans 1975; renamed Army & Navy; closed 1990s.			
North London Drapery Store	Holloway	Purchased by Canadian and English Stores in 1961 from Provident Cloth and Supply Company. Rebranded as Benjamin Beardmore Evans as a sister store to Kilburn.			

=== O ===
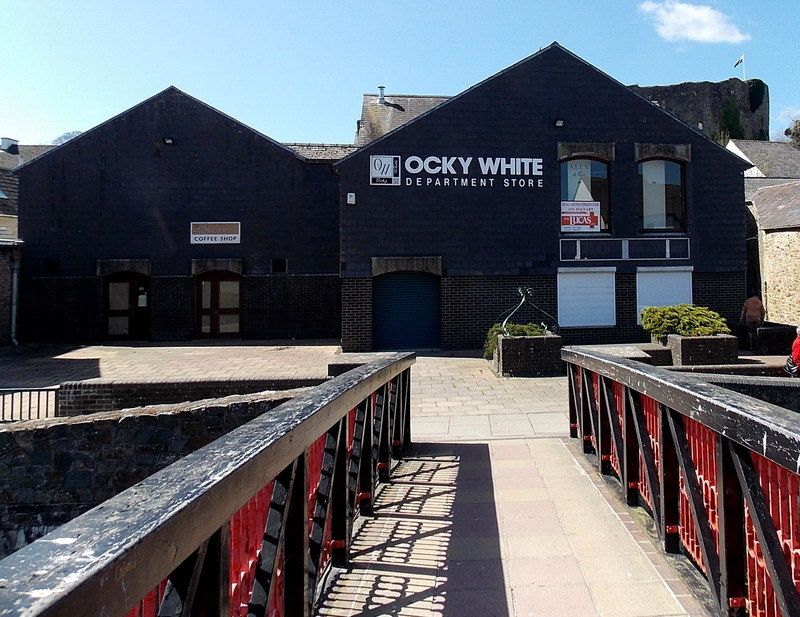
Ocky White, Haverfordwest - closed 2013 (Jaggery)

Name	Location	Description	Open	Closed	References
Ocky White	Haverfordwest	In 2022 excavations revealed a former burial ground had existed under the former store buildings.	1910	2013	
Ogg Brothers	Glasgow	Located on the junction of Paisley Road West and Govan Road.			
Ordish & Hall	Burton upon Trent		1815	1983	
John Orr & Sons	Airdrie		1858	2007	
R P Over & Sons	Camberley			1991	
William Owen	Bayswater		1873		
Owles & Beaumont	Knightsbridge, London	Situated on the Brompton Road, the store was first purchased by John Antsee Group, before becoming part of United Drapery Stores in 1948			
Oxleys	Wigan	A subsidiary of Canadian and English Stores, formerly Pooles Other locations: Widnes (formerly Abrahmsons); St. Helens; Leigh, Lancashire			

=== P ===
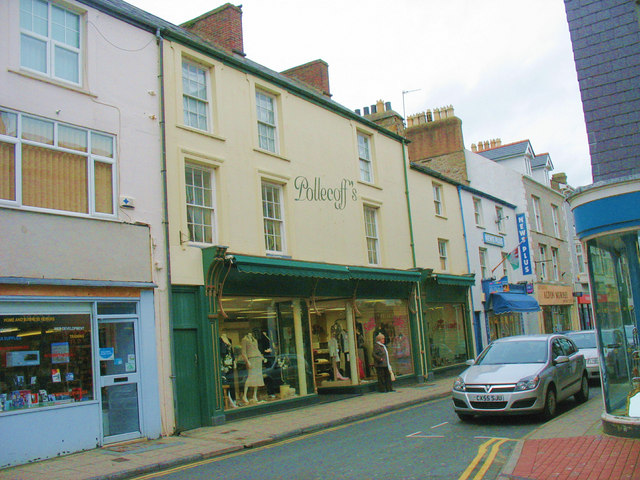
Pollecoff's Department Store, Pwllheli (Eric Jones)

Name	Location	Description	Opened	Closed	References
James Page	Camberley	Bought by United Drapery Stores; renamed Allders in 1979	1904	1979	
Dennis Paine & Co.	Maidstone	Bought by Chiesmans 1930; renamed Chiesmans; acquired by House of Fraser; closed c. 1983			
Palmers	Great Yarmouth	Other locations: Great Yarmouth; Lowestoft - Formerly Chadds; Norwich; Dereham; Bury St. Edmunds	1837	2020	
Palmers Stores	Hammersmith			c. 1980s	
Parkers	Edinburgh	Demolished in the 1970s to make way for expansion of Edinburgh University.			
J T Parrish	Byker		1875	1984	
Parson & Hart	Andover, Hampshire	Bought by Army & Navy in 1965, store sold to Woolworths. Other location: Bromley - Purchased from P. Martin in 1940.			
Pauldens	Manchester	Established in 1865 by William Paulden. The business was incorporated in 1917. The store was rebuilt in 1930, and was bought by Drapery Trust in 1931. Destroyed by fire 1957; relocated to Drilll Hall 1957; relocated to Rylands Warehouse building 1959; renamed Debenhams 1973. Other location: Sheffield - Opened by Debenhams as a branch of Pauldens; renamed Debenhams 1973	1865		
Pearsons	Bishop's Stortford	Opened as a branch of Pearsons of Enfield 1972 in premises formerly occupied by H Sparrow. Bought by Morleys Stores 2010; closed 2012.			
Pearsons	Wood Green, London	Opened as a branch of Pearsons of Enfield. Closed prior to sale to Morles and now a Primark.			
Pearson Brothers	Nottingham	Later Pearsons.	1889		
Joseph Peck	Rotherham	Small chain based in Yorkshire Other locations: Barnsley; Sheffield; Worksop			
Pendleburys	Wigan	Bought by Debenhams 1948; renamed Debenhams 1973.			
Penningtons	Spalding	Opened in 1850 by Charles Pennington. Destroyed during World War II bombing raid in 1941. Store rebuilt, became part of H E Keightley & Son, before the former became part of Macowards, but closed in 1969.			
Penrith Co-operative Society	Penrith	Non-food departments closed in 2015.			
Pettigrew & Stephens	Glasgow				
Pettits	Kensington	Located at 191–195 Kensington High Street.	1890	1978	
Pettits	Wallingford	Purchased by John Sanders of Ealing in 1985.			
Gray Peverell & Co.	West Hartlepool	Bought by Binns 1926; renamed Binns. Acquired by House of Fraser 1953; closed 1992.	1902		
Philpotts	St Leonards-on-Sea				
Plattens	Great Yarmouth and Gorleston-on-Sea		1876	1998	
William Plumpton & Son	Bury St Edmunds	Bought by Palmers in 1961; renamed Palmers.			
John Polglase	Penzance	Bought by E Dingle & Co. 1960s.			
Pollecoffs	Pwllheli	Had branches in Caernarfon and Holyhead. No longer a department store, now operates as a ladies fashion boutique.			
Ponting Brothers	Kensington	Bought by John Barker & Co. 1907. Acquired by House of Fraser 1957; closed 1970.			
Pophams	Plymouth	Opened in 1824 as Pophams & Radford before the Radford element was dropped in 1931. Bought out by Dingles in 1962 and closed shortly after.	1824		
The Poplar Stores	Wealdstone				
W F Potts	Dartford				
Pratts	Bingley	Bought by Brown Muff; renamed Brown Muff; acquired by House of Fraser.			
Pratts	Streatham	Bought by Bon Marché in 1920. Acquired by Selfridge Provincial Stores 1926. Subsequently, acquired by John Lewis Partnership 1940; closed 1990	1867		
Priors	Finchley	Bought by Owen Owen			
Pugh Brothers	Llanelli				
Pullman & Sons	Nottingham				
Pyne Brothers	Deptford				

=== Q ===
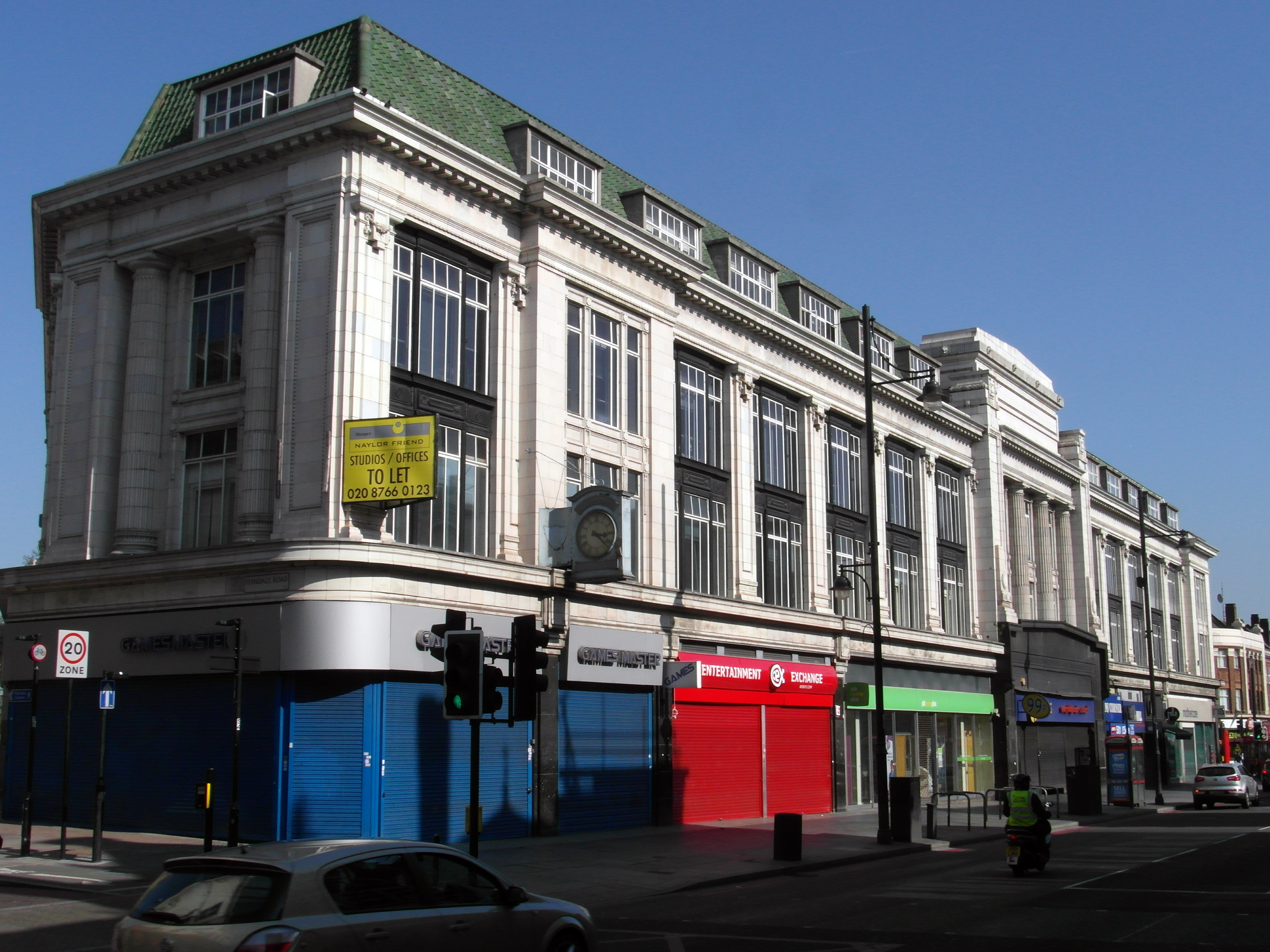
Former building of Quin & Axten (Reading Tom)

Name	Location	Description	Opened	Closed	References
Quin & Axten	Brixton	Bought by Bon Marché in 1920. Acquired by Selfridge Provincial Stores 1926. Subsequently, acquired by John Lewis Partnership 1940; closed 1949		1949	

=== R ===
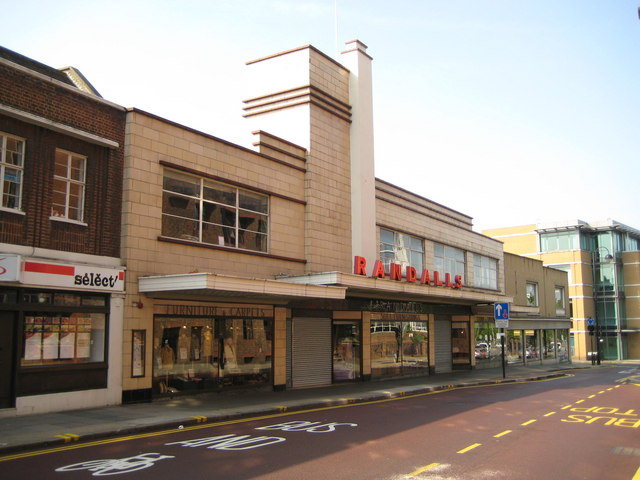
Randall's of Uxbridge (Nigel Cox)

- Rackham & Co (Birmingham) – Established 1881, became part of Harrods 1955, later House of Fraser 1959.
- A L Ramsay (Elgin) – Established 1845, later A L Ramsay & Son. Bought by Benzie & Miller; renamed Benzie & Miller. Acquired by House of Fraser; renamed Arnotts; closed.
- Ranbys (Derby) Opened in 1871 by Mary & Harry Ranby at 24 Victoria Street. By 1880 they had stores in Victoria and Queen Street. The Ranbys nieces, the Ward sisters took over the business in 1917, but sold it to a Welsh company about 1939. In 1962 the store was rebuilt. It was bought by Debenhams and renamed Debenhams in 1973. Debenhams closed the store and relocated in 2007.
- Randalls (Uxbridge) – Established 1891; closed 31 January 2015.
- Rankin & Co. (Banff) – Bought by Benzie & Miller; renamed Benzie & Miller. Acquired by House of Fraser 1958; renamed Arnotts 1970s; closed 1980s.
- H L Reid (Epsom) – bought by Great Northern & Southern Stores and Wright Brothers in 1938. Company became part of Hide & Co after the reverse takeover of Great Northern & Southern Stores and Wrights. The registered office of H L Reid was changed to the address of Seccombes department store in Cardiff, though the business only ever traded at Epsom. House of Fraser bought Hide & Co in 1975. H L Reid was renamed Chiesmans and closed in 1984.
- Reid & Pearson (Aberdeen) - Opened 1905. Purchased by Scottish Drapery in 1949. In 1952 became part of House of Fraser. Closed 1955.
- Reynolds (Newport, Wales) purchased by James Howell & Co; purchased by Macowards in 1962; bought by Owen Owen; renamed Owen Owen
  - Reynolds (Cardiff) – Opened as a branch of Reynolds of Newport. Bought by James Howell & Co.
- Ricemans (Canterbury; previously Deal, Kent) – Relocated from Deal to purpose-built Canterbury store 1960s. Bought by Fenwick 1986; renamed Fenwick on relocation to new building 2003.
- Richards of Abergavenny (Abergavenny) Established in 1909, the business was bought by the Harrison family in 1996. The store closed in 2012.
- Rightons (Evesham) – bought by Hide & Co.; acquired by House of Fraser; closed 1975
- Robbs (Birkenhead) – established 1872; closed 1982
- J Robb & Co (Belfast) - Opened in 1861. Purchased by Great Universal Stores in 1951. Closed in 1973.
- Evan Roberts (Cardiff) – Opened 1890. Closed 1983. Building demolished 1985.
- J R Roberts Stores (Stratford)
  - J R Roberts Stores (Southend-on-Sea) – opened as a branch of J R Roberts of Stratford
- T R Roberts (Islington) Started in 1862, the business started as a drapers by John and Thomas Reynold Roberts, with the partnership ending in 1870. A company was created to buy the shares of the business in 1895, with Thomas Roberts retiring in 1896. The store became a full department store after purchasing rival draper, Matthew Henry Rackstraw. The store became part of Hide & Co in 1946.
- W J Roberts & Sons (Truro) – formerly Bon Marché
- Roberts Brothers (Sheffield) – In September 1896 two enterprising young brothers Charles and Arnold Roberts opened Rockingham House in The Moor. The store grew but was destroyed during World War II, with temporary stores opened in Eccleshall and London Road. The new building partially opened in 1955, fully opening in 1960. The store merged with neighbouring furniture store, Eyres, with the business closing during the 70s.
- Robinsons (Woking) – established 1934; closed 1997
- Robinson Brothers (Carlisle) – established 1889; bought by Binns 1933; renamed Binns; acquired by House of Fraser 1953; renamed House of Fraser c. 2000
  - Robinson Brothers (Dumfries) – opened as a branch of Robinson Brothers of Carlisle; acquired by Binns 1933; renamed Binns; subsequently acquired by House of Fraser 1953; closed c. 1994
- J F Rockhey (Torquay) – bought by D H Evans. Acquired by Harrods; subsequently acquired by House of Fraser 1959; incorporated into the Dingles group c. 1972; renamed Dingles c. 1972; closed 1980s
  - J F Rockhey (Newton Abbot) – opened as a branch of J F Rockhey of Torquay; acquired by D H Evans; subsequently acquired by Harrods; subsequently acquired by House of Fraser 1959
- P. D. Rogers (Penge) merged with Bryce Grant
- E P Rose (Bedford) Opened in 1838 when Edward Paine Rose's father purchased an existing drapers at 51 High Street. The business moved across the road to 50 High Street before expanding to take in no. 46 to 52. The business stayed in the Rose family until the 1960s when it was bought by Debenhams, being renamed Debenhams in the 1970s.
- Matthew Rose & Sons (Hackney) – established 1868; closed 1936; premises sold to Marks & Spencer
- Roslings (Brighton) – Opened at no. 31 London Road in 1905 before extending in 1932. Store closed in 1960 being purchased by Woolworths who opened their new store in 1965.
- Rossiter & Son (Paignton) First Rossiter drapery store was opened by Srah and Jane Rossiter at Winner Street in 1858. By 1888 the store had moved to Palace Avenue. In 1934 the business became a limited company, and reached its 150th anniversary in 2008, but closed in January 2009.
- Jeremiah Rotherham & Co (Shoreditch) – established 1860; building destroyed by bombing 1941; closed 1941
- Rowans (Glasgow) opened 1846 in Buchanan Street specialising in men's clothing and sports equipment. Purchased by Austin Reed in 1974.
- William Rowe (Gosport) – bought by William McIlroy
- W. Rowntree & Sons (Scarborough) – established 1881
- F H Rowse (West Ealing) - purchased John Sanders in Ealing. Closed F H Rowse in 1980s.
- Rudkin Turner (Leicester) – Succeeded Grices.
- Rushworths (Huddersfield)
- Russell & Dorrell (Worcester) – established 1834; department store closed 2003; furniture store closed 2011

=== S ===
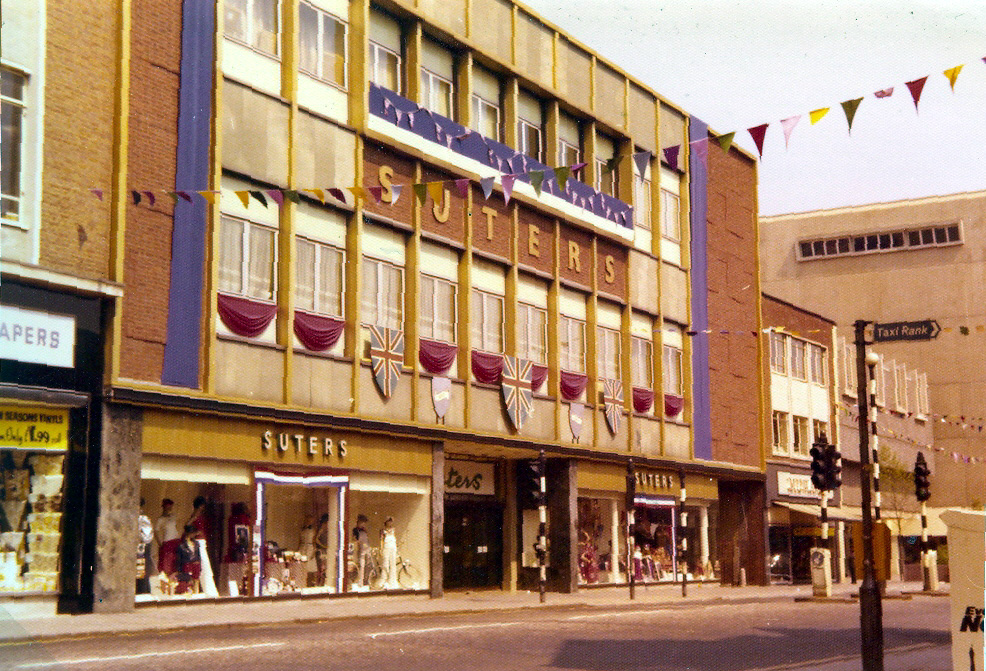
Suters Department Store, Slough from 1978 before becoming an Owen Owen. (Philip1951)

Name	Location	Description	Opened	Closed	References
Salts Brothers	Swadlincote	Established by Joseph and Enoch Salt as a drapery. A further store was opened in Moira, firstly as a butchers and grocers by their brother John, before it also becoming a drapery. Further stores were opened in Newhall, Castle Gresley and in Alvaston, Derby. Joseph emigrated to Canada, but Enoch was joined by another brother, Hezekiah. In 1925, the drapery store was joined on the opposite side of the High Street by a furniture and hardware store.	1895	1982	
Arthur Sanders	Darlington	Bought by Binns 1922; renamed Binns. Acquired by House of Fraser 1953. Now only surviving store to retain the Binns name.	1770	1922	
John Sanders	Ealing	Founded as a drapers, purchased Lyttons in Ruislip, FW Rouse in West Ealing and Pettits in Wallingford. Ealing store was sold to Marks & Spencers in 1990. Business continues at Ruislip.	1865		
Eldred Sayers & Sons	Ealing	Bought by Bentalls in 1950; renamed Bentalls; relocated. Acquired by Fenwick. Bought by J E Beale from Fenwick; renamed Beales; closed		1950	
Robert Sayle	Cambridge	Bought by Selfridge Provincial Stores 1934. Acquired by John Lewis Partnership 1940; renamed John Lewis 2007. Other location: Peterborough (succeeded Thomsons as a branch of Robert Sayle of Cambridge; destroyed by fire and closed 1956)	1840	1956	
Seccombes	Cardiff	Started as George A Seccombe and Co, a fancy drapers in Queen Street. Bought by Hide & Co. in 1955; acquired by House of Fraser 1975; closed 1977	1895		
Sheltons	Peterborough	Opened by Charles Shelton, a builder in Peterborough, who saw an opening for a department store in the town. The store was built on the site of the Theatre Royal which Charles had purchased in 1959, and was built in two stages, with the final stage completed in 1964. In 1966, Charles died with his wife Laura taking charge. The store closed in 1990, with sales affected by the opening of the Queensgate Shopping Centre in the early 80s.	1962	1990	
Sherriff & Ward	Winchester	Bought by Debenhams; renamed Debenhams.			
Shinners	Sutton	One of the founders of United Drapery Stores. Renamed to Allders in 1979.		1979	
Shirers & Lances	Cheltenham	Closed in the 1970s.			
James Shoolbred	Tottenham Court Road, London		c. 1820s	1931	
Shrubsoles	Kingston upon Thames	Started by William Shrubsole and Henry Knight. Shrubsole was a partner in a bank which became part of National Westminster Bank. Store was sold to Joseph Hide, becoming Hide & Co in 1873. Eventually became a Chiesmans after the House of Fraser purchase, before being branded an Army & Navy. Closed 1987			
Simes	Worcester	Bought by Debenhams; incorporated into the Bobby & Co. group; renamed Debenhams			
Sinclairs	Belfast			1972	
Charles Sloper & Sons	Devizes	Half of store sold to Woolworths in 1933.	1690	1974	
William Small & Sons	Edinburgh	bought by House of Fraser; closed			
J C Smith	Nuneaton	Bought by Debenhams in 1929; renamed Debenhams. Other locations: Bedworth (Opened as a branch of J C Smith, acquired by Debenhams then closed.; Stratford-upon-Avon (Opened as a branch, acquired by Debenhams & renamed Debenhams in 1972)		1976	
R J Smiths	Aberdeen	Purchased by House of Fraser in 1981.			
Smith Brothers	Dundee				
Smith Brothers	Tooting	Established in the early 1900s. The store was bought by Morleys of Brixton in 1955; renamed Morleys 2010	c.1900	2010	
Snowball & Son	Gateshead		1850		
Somertons	Harrow				
Sopers	Brighton	Opened by Samuel Henry Soper. Replaced by Lessons in the 1920s.	1860	c. 1920s	
Sopers	Harrow	Bought by Debenhams.			
Soutars Ltd	Arbroath	Known as James Soutar, at The Sign of the Eagle. Bought by House of Fraser; renamed Arnotts; closed			
Henry Sparrow	Bishop Stortford	Started as Sworders Ironmongery store during the mid-1800s in North Street. In 1904 it was bought by the stores clerk, Henry Sparrow. His family grew it into Bishop Stortford's only department store. In 1971 the business was sold by auction to Pearsons of Enfield. Pearsons was sold to Morleys Stores in 2010, with the Bishop Stortford store closed in 2012.			
John Speed	Rotherham				
James Spence & Co.	St Paul's Churchyard, London				
Spencer Turner & Boldero	Lisson Grove, London	Established in 1837 as Boldero Ltd, the first record of the company at Lisson Grove was 1851, when William Spencer & Co was recorded in Kelly's Directory, with the census of that year listing 17 Drapery assistants and a porter, and two Drapery masters, William Boldero and Henry Turner. The company was first listed as Spencer, Turner & Boldero in 1855. The business diversified, so by late 1876 not only was it a retail drapers, but a wholesaler in a variety of goods from linen to tea, and by 1887 they are described as manufacturers and warehousemen, agents and importers. The business expanded and by 1938 operated from 61 to 85, 89-93 Lisson Grove, 1-22 Duke Street, 1-5 Devonshire Street and 2-8 Exeter Street, with a concrete bridge connecting the properties either side of Duke Street. The company lost the Exeter Street site, now known as Ashbridge Street due to bomb damage during the Blitz. The firm was last recorded in 1969 as "Spencer, Turner and Boldero Limited (including Devas Routledge and Co Ltd), wholesale textile warehousemen at 61-93 Lisson Grove, before the redevelopment of the area.	1837	1969	
Henry Spokes	Hackney				
Spooners	Plymouth	Bought by Debenhams in 1929; merged with John Yeo and together renamed Debenhams in 1977.	1837		
St. Cuthbert's Co-operative Society	Edinburgh	Opened first store 1859. Department store in Bread Street in 1892. Merged with Dalziel Society of Motherwell to form Scotmid in 1981.	1859	1981	
Staddons	Nottingham	Department store closed; now a specialist bedroom furniture store (2015).			
Staddons	Plaistow	Bought by Drapery Trust; ownership subsequently transferred to Debenhams; sold. Closed.			
Staffords	Brighton				
Stagg & Russell	Leicester Square, London	Became part of the Drapery Trust			
Stanleys	Birmingham	Bought by Debenhams c. 1945			
Steele	Dorchester	Succeeded by George Dixon & Jameson 1889	1843		
T B Stephens	Stoke Newington			1973	
Stewart & McDonald	Glasgow	The Department Store of a manufacturing business that started in 1826. The retail business was separated in 1913.			
Stones	Romford	Bought by Debenhams and then renamed to Debenhams in the same year. Debenhams closed in 2021 and was replaced by the Aklu Plaza Asian mall.	1864	1960	
Strange & Atkinson	Eastbourne	Bought by Bobby & Co.			
Stringers	Stourbridge	Bought by Owen Owen; renamed Owen Owen; closed 1990.			
George Sturla & Co	Liverpool	Started by George Sturla at 154 Great Homer Street, the business offered credit through Sturla cheques, and opening stores across Merseyside, the West Midlands and operating Oakes & Hulme stores. The 9 department stores were purchased by Macowards in 1968.	1879		
Style & Gerrish	Salisbury	Opened by John Style & John Large as Style & Large as wholesale linen drapers. By 1863 George Gerrish had replaced John Large, and the company name was changed. The business was bought by Debenhams prior to 1956 and in 1972 it was renamed.	1803	1972.	
Suters	Slough	Bought by Owen Owen; renamed Owen Owen Other location: Uxbridge (Renamed Owen Owen)			
J K Swallow & Sons	Chesterfield				
George Swan	North Shields	Bought by Shephards of Gateshead; renamed Shephards			
Swan & Edgar	Piccadilly Circus			1982	

=== T ===
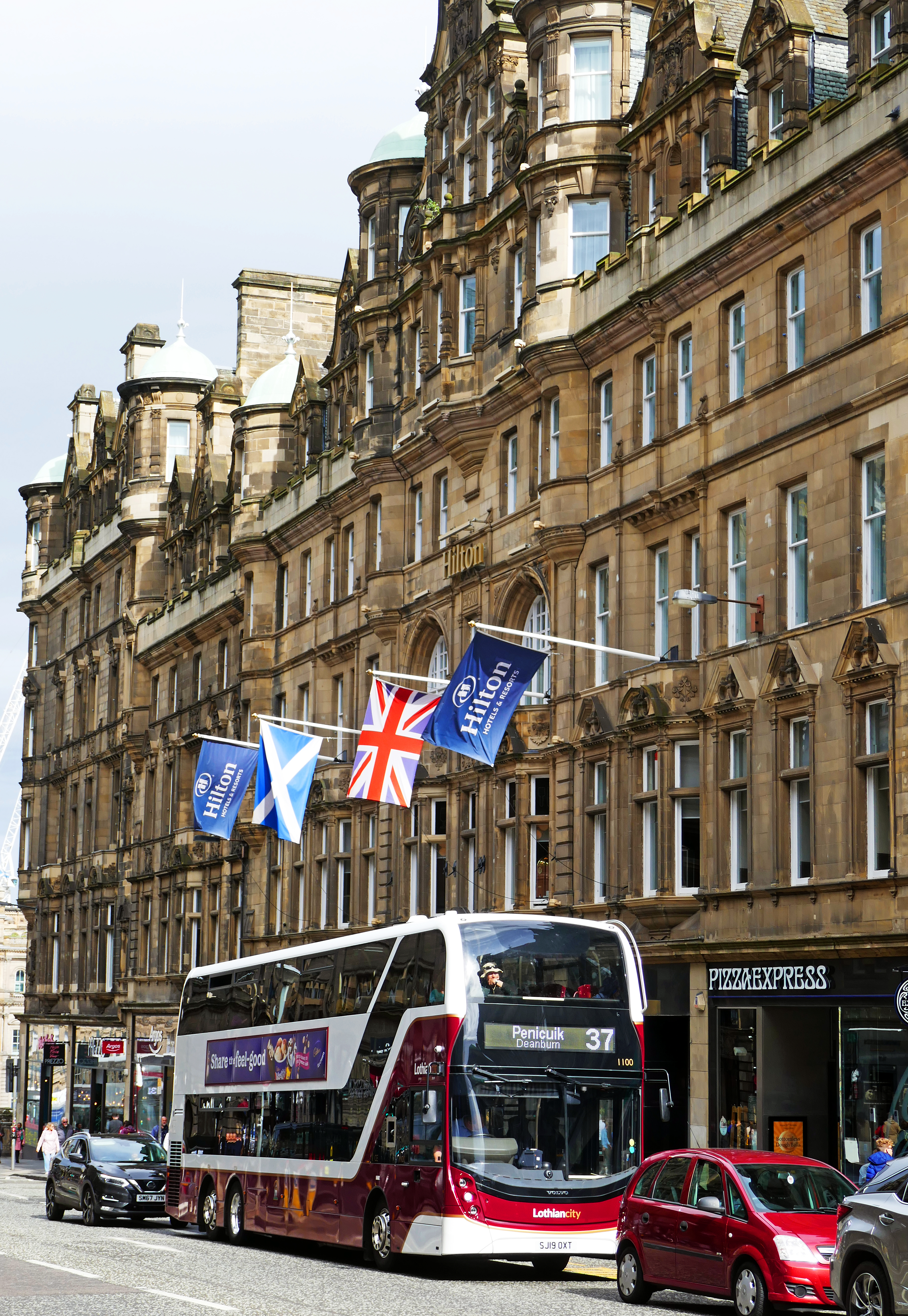
Former Patrick Thomson building, Edinburgh, now a Hilton Hotel (Calstanhope)

Name	Location	Description	Opened	Closed	References
R R Talbot	Weymouth	Was purchased by the Drapery Trust in 1928 and transferred to Plummer Roddis		1928	
Tanner & Chart	Horsham	Became part of William Mcllroy/Mcllroys.			
William Tarn & Co	Elephant and Castle		c. 1799		
Fred Taylor	Yeovil	Purchased by Plummer Roddis in the 1940s.	1913	c. 1940s	
Frederick Taylor & Son	Lambeth				
Joshua Taylor	Cambridge			1990s	
J R Taylor	St Annes-on-Sea	Purchased Blackburn firm Mabel Stevenson in the 1950s. Other location: Bolton - Store was formally Whiteheads.	1901	2015	
W M Taylor	Erdington	Bought by Owen Owen; renamed Owen Other locations: Kings Heath; Sutton Coldfield			
Taylors	Basildon	Bought by House of Fraser 1979; incorporated into the Army & Navy group; renamed Army & Navy.			
Taylors	Clifton	Bought by Debenhams; renamed Debenhams			
The House That Jack Built	Aston				
Thomas Brothers	Southend-on-Sea	Located in Southchurch Avenue in two buildings either side of Prittlewell Path, located where the Victoria Shopping Centre now stands.			
B Thomas	Helston	Bought by E Dingle & Co. 1960s			
W C Thompson (trading as Liverpool House)	Sunderland		1867		
Patrick Thomson	Edinburgh	Bought by Scottish Drapery Corporation; acquired by House of Fraser; renamed Arnotts 1976; closed		1976	
Thomsons	Peterborough	Bought by Selfridge Provincial Stores; acquired by John Lewis Partnership 1940; renamed Robert Sayle; destroyed by fire and closed 1956			
Thornton Varley	Hull	Originally R Thornton, bought by Debenhams in 1953; renamed Debenhams 1970s.			
Thurman & Malin	Derby		1879	1970	
J H Tobys	Nottingham	Opened 1929 by James And Florence Hartley. Toby was James' nickname. The business was sold to Grant-Warden of Walton on Thames in 1968 when Florence died. It closed in 1982.	1929		
Treron et Cie	Glasgow	Established by Walter Wilson.	1896		
Trewin Brothers	Watford	Bought by Selfridge Provincial Stores 1918. Acquired by John Lewis Partnership 1940.			
Trippetts	Bradford		1887		
Thomas Tucker	Exmouth	Bought by Benzie family, of Benzie & Miller, 1958; closed 2007.	1801	2007	
Tuckwood's Stores	Sheffield	Located in Fargate, the Department store sold groceries, household goods, medicines and had both a restaurant and a café.			
Tudor Williams	New Malden	Dorking site operates a bed shop	1919	2019	
Tuttles	Lowestoft	Bought by Debenhams c. 1960; sold c. 1973 closed.			
Tyrers	St Helens		1888	2016	
Tyrell & Green	Southampton	Bought by John Lewis Partnership 1934; renamed John Lewis on relocation to new building 2000.	1897	2000	

=== U ===
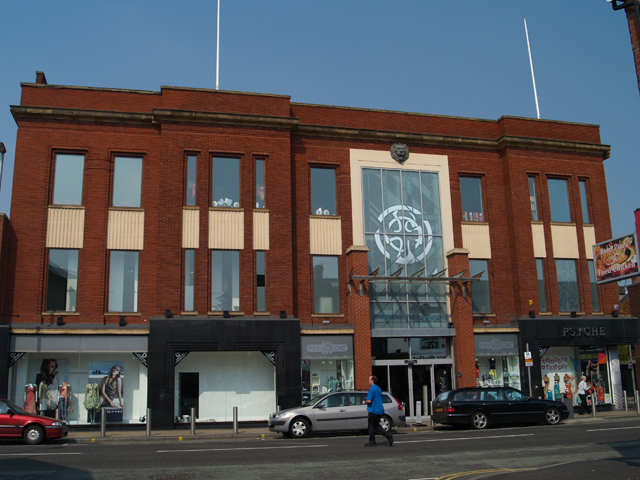
Former Uptons building in Linthorpe Road. (Mike Guess)

Name	Location	Description	Opened	Closed	References
E Upton & Sons	Middlesbrough	Main store in Linthorpe Road, had further branches in South Bank and Redcar.			

=== V ===
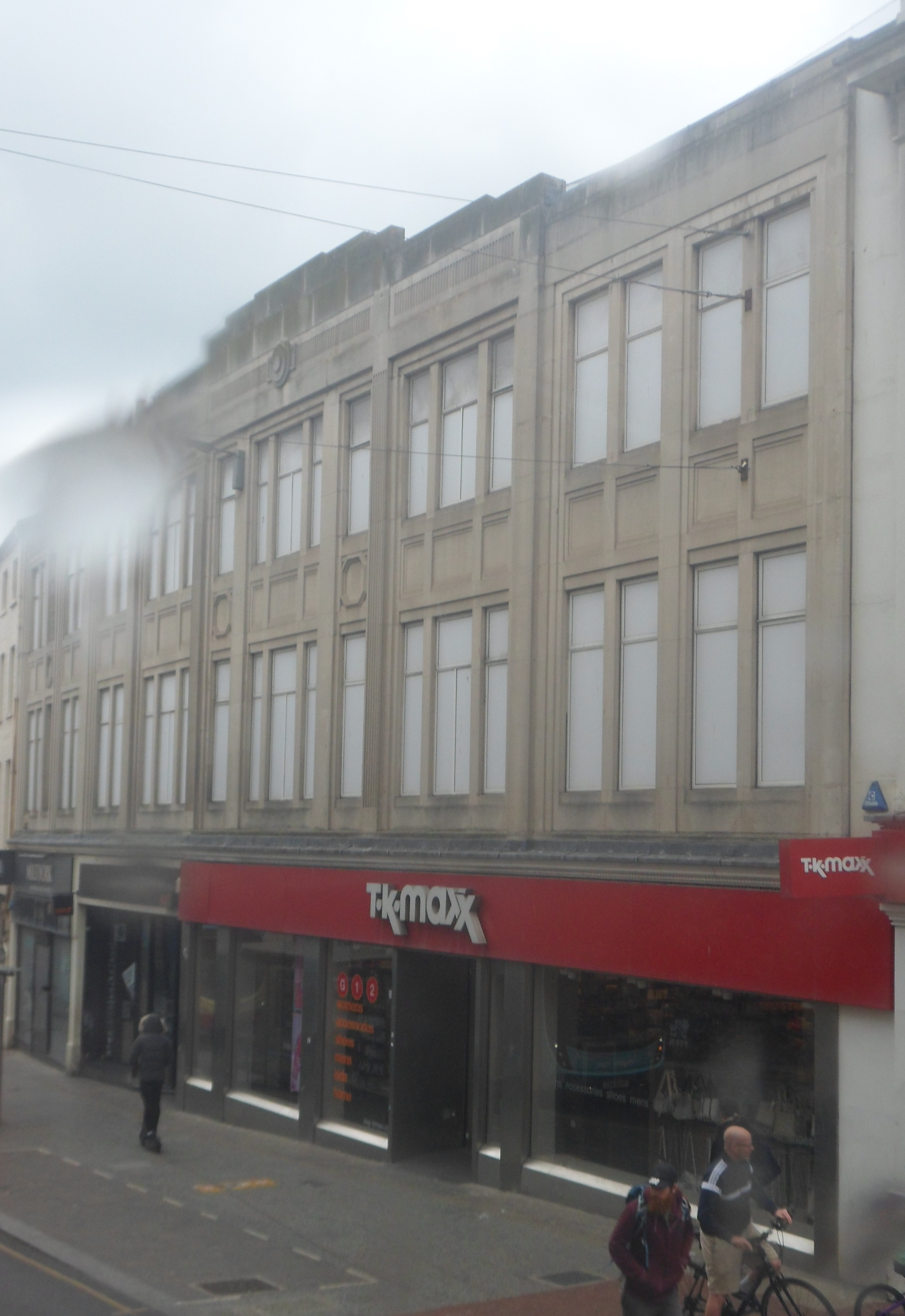
Former Vokins store, Brighton. Closed in 1997 (Hassocks5489)

Name	Location	Description	Opened	Closed	References
Verity & Sons	Doncaster	Bought by Owen Owen in 1950; renamed Owen Owen. Bought by House of Fraser from Owen Owen 1975; incorporated into the Binns group; renamed Binns; converted to an outlet store; renamed House of Fraser Outlet.	1865		
Vinalls	Eastbourne	Established 1870s. Bought by John Lewis Partnership 1947; sold to McCartney Stewart. Site now occupied by part of Marks & Spencer and south-eastern section of Arndale Centre (2015).			
Vivian Brothers	Camborne		1839		
Vokins	Brighton	Established 1882 as 'Leeson & Vokins'. Traded as 'Leeson & Vokins' 1882–1937; W H Vokins 1937–1983; Vokins 1983–1997; closed 1997. Vokins continued to trade as 'Vokins Furniture & Beds' from a site in Hove until closure in 2015.	1882	1997	

=== W ===
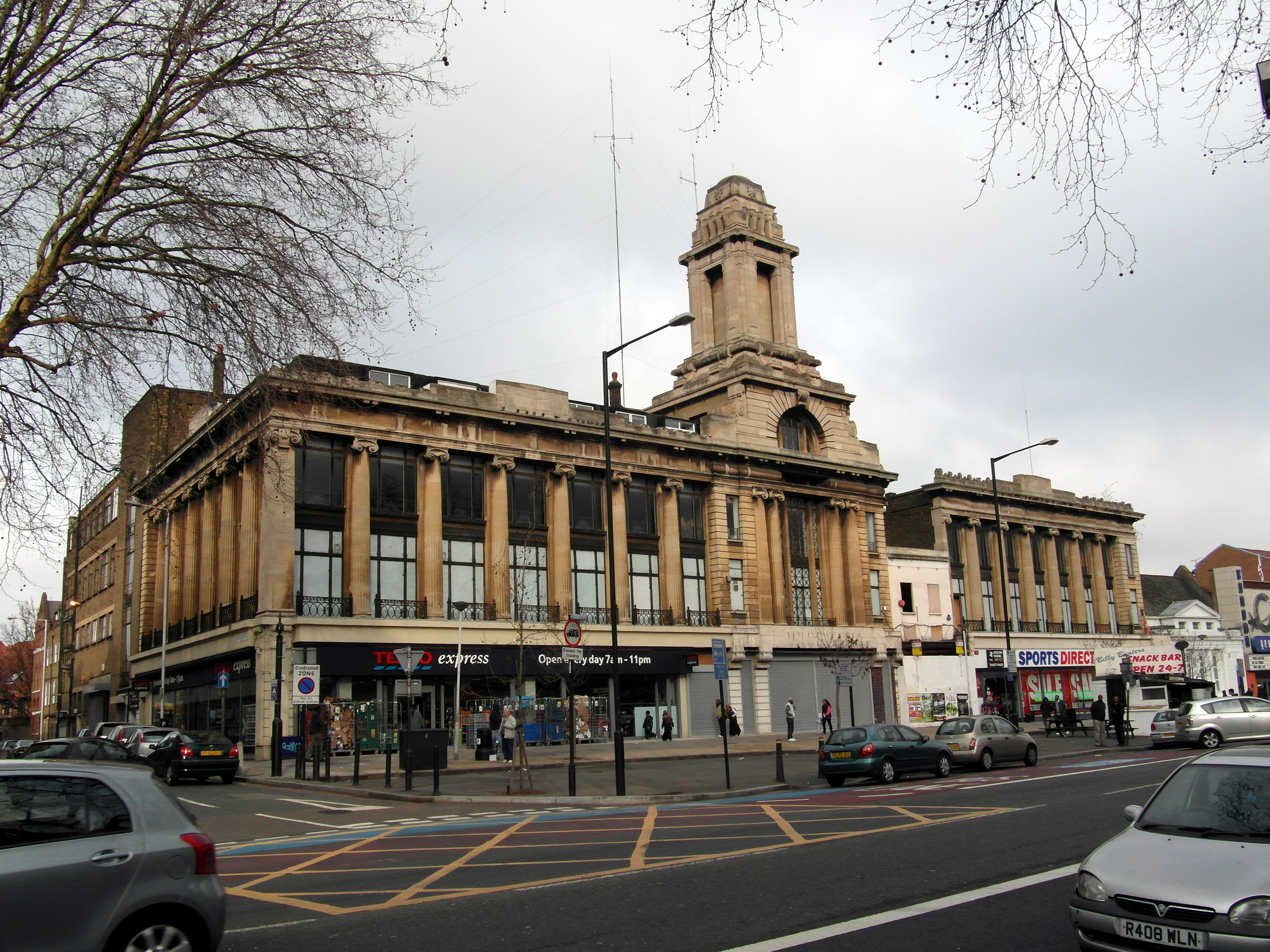
Wickhams Mile End Road (Reading Tom)

Name	Location	Description	Opened	Closed	References
W J Wade	Brighton	Store rebuilt in 1930. Bought by Macowards in 1959; bought by Owen Owen in 1975.	1890s		
Thomas Wallis & Co.	London	Holborn building was destroyed during the blitz and the store moved to stores between 445 and 556 Oxford Street in 1941. Store was bought by Macowards in 1961 but the Oxford Street store was closed in 1969 and the lease sold to Littlewoods. Other locations: Streatham; Guildford; Sidcup (formerly Dawsons & Co); Bromley; Newbury; Basingstoke (formerly Lanhams)	1825		
John Walsh	Sheffield	Bought by Harrods. Acquired by House of Fraser 1959; renamed Rackhams 1970s; renamed House of Fraser 1980s; closed 1998.		1972	
Walter Brothers	Worthing	Based on South Street.	1846	1971	
Waltons	Exeter	Store now part of Marks and Spencer site. Other location: Exmouth - Closed in 1982.	1905	1972	
E L Ward	Cheltenham				
Wards	Seven Sisters	Still known locally as Ward's Corner.	1901	1972	
Henry Warren & Son	Newton Abbot	Bought by E Dingle & Co. 1960s			
Warwick House	Birmingham	Birmingham's first department store, later on became part of Marshall & Snelgrove.	1839		
Warwick House	Malvern		1842	1992	
Waterloo House	Newcastle upon Tyne	Based on Thornton Road.			
Watt & Grant	Aberdeen				
Waymarks	Tunbridge Wells	Bought by Chiesmans.			
J C Webber & Sons	Maidenhead	Purchased by Great Universal Stores.			
Webbers	Oxford	Succeeded City Drapery Stores 1905. Bought by Hide & Co. 1952; closed 1971			
Weekes	Tunbridge Wells	Bought by Hoopers & renamed to Hoopers.			
Wellsteeds	Reading	Bought by Debenhams; renamed Debenhams in 1973.	1870	1973	
Welwyn Department Store	Welwyn Garden City	Established in 1939 replacing the earlier Welwyn Stores which had opened in 1921, by the Welwyn Garden City Trust. The business was purchased by Garfield Weston though his subsidiary Howardsgate Holdings in the 1950s, before being moved to his company Associated British Foods in 1963. It was bought by the John Lewis Partnership in 1983 and renamed John Lewis in 1984.	1939	1984	
Wengers	Newcastle upon Tyne	Opened in the 1960s by Sam Wenger in the former Newcastle and Gateshead Gas Company headquarters.	1960s	1983	
West's	Ilford	Purchased by R H O Hills in 1959.			
Wheatley & Whiteley	Leeds				
Whitakers	Bolton	Bought by Beales in 1996, renamed to Beales in 2011 then closed in 2018.	1829	2011	
Henry White	Newcastle-under-Lyme				
Rocky White	Haverfordwest		1910	2013	
W E White & Son	Guildford	Occupied by Marks & Spencer since the 1960s			
Thomas White & Co.	Aldershot	Bought by Army & Navy Stores 1961; renamed Army & Navy; acquired by House of Fraser; closed 1980s			
White & Ellis	Ramsgate				
White House	Derby	Located in Babington Road. Owned by Cattles Holdings, formerly Hull Clothing & Supply at one point.			
R Whitehead & Son	Bolton			2001	
William Whiteley	London				
Frederick Wickham	Tunbridge Wells	Succeeded by Mary Lee in the 1930s.			
Wickhams	Mile End Road, London				
Wildings	Newport	Other location: Thornbury			
Williams & Cox	Torquay	Building bought by Hoopers and reopened as the first Hoopers store 1982.	1982		
Williams & Griffin	Colchester				
Williamson & Cole	Clapham				
Willis Ludlow	Hull	Other location: Leeds			
Wills	Rushden	Went into liquidation. Other locations: Wellingborough - Opened in 1936.; Kettering - Opened in 1938 & closed in 1986	1922	2010	
Wilson	Stockton on Tees	Moved to 55 High Street in 1888.	1856	1968	
G L Wilson	Dundee		1894	1971	
James H Wilson	Crouch End	Bought by Hide & Co.; acquired by House of Fraser 1975; closed.			
Walter Wilson & Co.	Glasgow	Trading as 'Grand Colosseum'; bought by Dallas's 1936.	1873		
Wilson & Co.	Brentwood	Building destroyed by fire in 1909. Store re-opened with new grand building and became known as Wilson's Corner.	1883	1978	
Winch & Blatch	Sudbury	Homeware store sold to C J Townrow & Sons.	1850s	2020	
Fred Winter	Stratford upon Avon		1858	2019	
WS Wood	Colwyn Bay	Opened as a ladies shop. Expanded over the next 20 years into a department store. New building by Sidney Colwyn Foulkes completed in 1933. Acquired by Macowards in 1956. Purchased by Owen Owen. Sold by Owen Owen to Co-op Retail Services. Building as grade II listing.	1912		
Woodward's	Leamington Spa	On corner of Regent Street and the Parade. Store was closed by then owners Merchant Retail on 31 July 2004, contributing £300,000 profit to the group. The building was sold to Atlantic Property Developments plc who demolished the building in 2005.	1908	2004	
Wood & Selby	Glasgow	Opened by James Wood, purchased by House of Fraser in 1952.	1880s		
Woolland Brothers	Knightsbridge	New building completed 1901. Bought by Debenhams 1949; closed 1967. Building demolished. Site now occupied by The Park Tower Knightsbridge Hotel (2015).	1869	1967	
John Woollright & Co.	Liverpool				
Wright Brothers	Richmond	Bought by Hide & Co. 1940. Acquired by House of Fraser 1975. Bought by Owen Owen from House of Fraser 1976; renamed Owen Owen; closed 1990; premises sold to Tesco. Building now occupied by Tesco Metro (2015).			
Wright & Co.	Middlesbrough	Established by Lawrence Wright & Richard Archibald and known as Wrights Tower House. Richard Archibald retired in 1895. Refurbished in 1956. Closed in 1986. Building demolished 1987.	1862		
R. Wylie Hill	Glasgow	Founded by Robert Wylie Hill, grandson of Robert Wylie and great nephew of William Lochhead. The business at 20 Buchanan Street burnt down, but was rebuilt with input in the details designs by Charles Rennie Mackintosh in 1888. The business was bought by newsagents John Menzies in 1974 and closed.	1883	1974	
Wylie & Lochhead	Glasgow	Bought by House of Fraser 1957; merged with McDonalds and together renamed McDonalds, Wylie & Lochhead 1957; renamed Frasers 1975.			

=== Y ===
Name	Location	Description	Opened	Closed	References
John Yeo	Plymouth	Bought by Debenhams in 1964; merged with Spooners and together renamed Debenhams in 1977.			
S Young & Son	Sevenoaks	One of the founder members of United Drapery Stores; closed 1977; became a Bejams Freezer store 1979, currently an Iceland			
Youngs	Falkirk	Based in Princes Street.			
