= Rackhams =

Former British department store

- Industry: Retail
- Founded: 1881; 145 years ago
- Founder: William Riddell and Henry Wilkinson
- Headquarters: Birmingham, England
- Area served: United Kingdom
- Website: www.rackhams.com

Rackhams was a British department store that opened in Birmingham, England in 1881. The business became part of the Harrods group in 1955, before Harrods was purchased by House of Fraser in 1959. As part of the Harrods grouping in House of Fraser, during the 1970s the Rackhams name was selected to be used as the Midlands and parts of the North of England brand name and several stores were added to its portfolio. In 2000 the Rackhams name was retired and replaced by House of Fraser. The brand was revived in September 2025 as an online-only marketplace under new ownership.

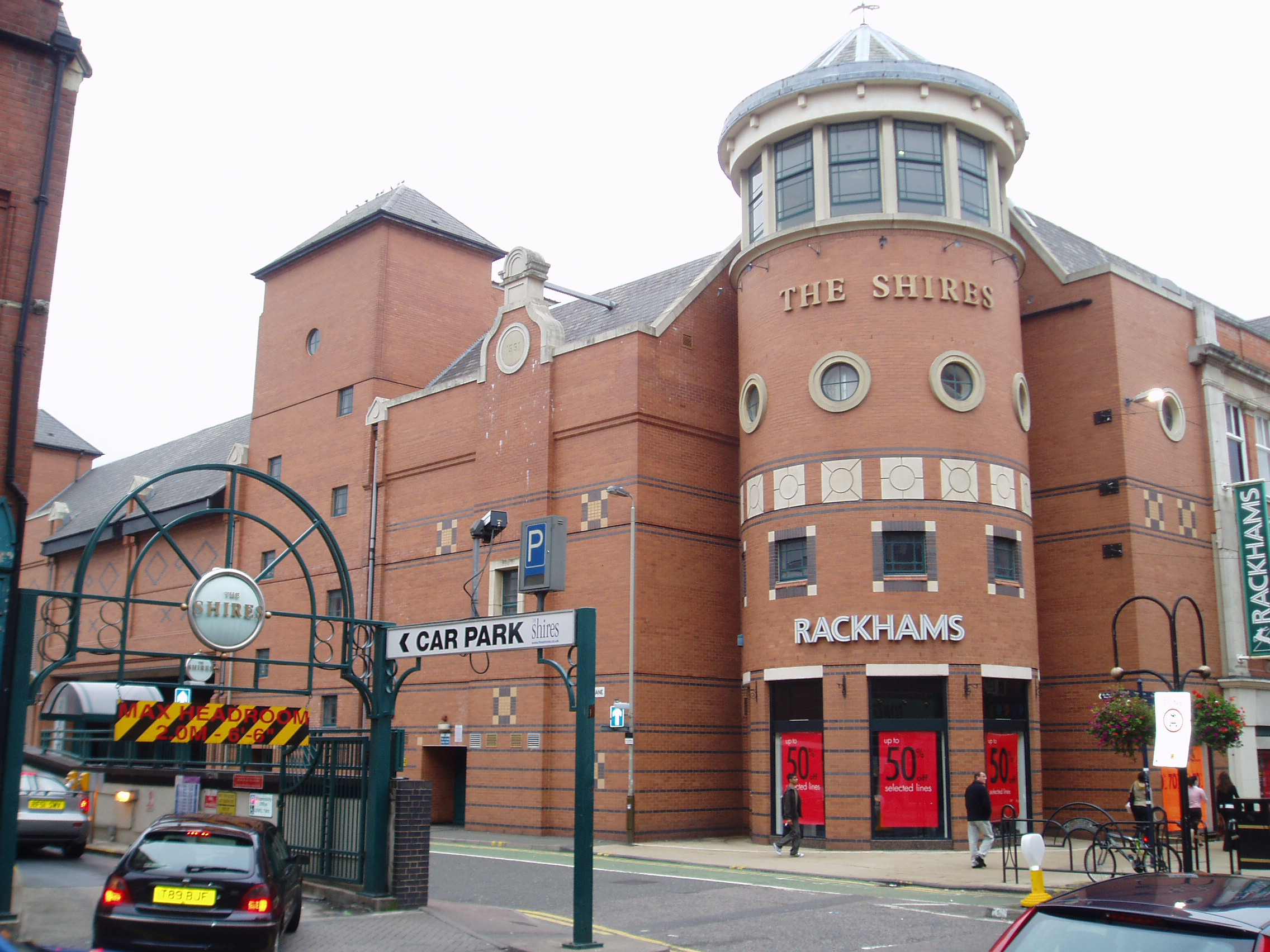
Rackhams (Leicester)

== History ==
In 1851 a new retail drapery business was opened by a partnership formed by William Riddell and Henry Wilkinson at 78 Bull Street, Birmingham, which by 1863 had expanded to a wholesale business based in Temple Row. During 1861 two apprentices joined the company, John Rackham and William Matthews who by 1878 had become buyers for the company. In 1881 the retail store was transferred into Rackham and Matthews ownership and became Rackham & Co.

The business was acquired in 1890 by a trader called Charles Richards. In 1898 Richards expanded the business into the North Western Arcade and within two years had added a Dressmaking department. In 1907, Richards's daughter Hettie married Frank Matthews, the son of former owner William Matthews and an employee of the business. Matthews was subsequently appointed manager.

The business was incorporated, along with Richards other business, Beehive a discount clothing warehouse, into Charles Richards Ltd in 1913, with Richards and his two daughters owning a third share. In 1914 the frontage on Bull Street was rebuilt and the store had expanded into Temple Row, as well as the Windsor and North Western Arcade. In 1921, Frank Matthew was replaced as manager by Richards's nephew, Charles Phillips. Under his management the store was vastly expanded in Temple Row.

In 1927 Maurice Clutterbuck took charge of the business, but it was struggling due to the economic climate and the store was made available for sale, though no bids were accepted during the 1930s. The business took a big hit during World War II when bombs destroyed a third of the store in 1940.

The business recovered after the war and in 1955 was purchased by Harrods to add to their group of department stores. Harrods brought substantial investment to the business, purchasing a large site on Corporation Street for a new store building, work on which began in 1957. Two years later, with the new store still under construction, House of Fraser completed the purchase of Harrods. The new Rackhams opened in phases between 1960 and 1966. On completion it became House of Fraser's second-largest department store.

By the mid 1970s House of Fraser had purchased and developed several regional trading groups, including Army & Navy in the south-east, Binns in the north and east and Dingles in the south-west of England. Initially the Harrods group remained largely unaffected by these new groupings. Cavendish House and Morgan Squire had been brought under Harrods management in 1969 and together with Rackhams, Kendal Milne, William Henderson & Sons and John Walsh were advertised as 'six shopping specials' under the informal 'Harrods Provincial Stores' banner. Elsewhere, House of Fraser had acquired several stores in the midlands through the purchase of Army & Navy Stores in 1973 and Hide & Co two years later. With the number of stores in the region increased, a new Midlands Division was created in 1975, bringing together the disparate stores in the region under a single group management. Carved out of the Harrods group with Rackhams selected as the principal trading name, five of the Harrods Provincial Stores, Rackhams amongst them, were transferred to the new division.

The stores re-branded as Rackhams were:

- Burgis & Colbourne Leamington Spa - formerly part of Army & Navy group which House of Fraser purchased in 1973. The store was rebranded in 1976.
- Thomas Clarkson & Son Wolverhampton - formerly part of Army & Navy group which House of Fraser purchased in 1973. The store was rebranded in 1976. The building the store once occupied, became a Netto supermarket before being demolished to make for the new Wolverhampton Market.
- Joseph Della Porta Shrewsbury - formerly part of Hide & Co department store chain, purchased by House of Fraser in 1975.
- Morgan Squire Leicester - formerly part of Bournemouth-based chain J J Allen, which House of Fraser purchased in 1969.
- John Walsh Sheffield - purchased by House of Fraser in 1959, the store was rebranded during the 1970s to Rackhams.
- Brown Muff were a chain of department stores purchased by House of Fraser in 1977 and added to the Rackhams group The stores transferred were Altrincham, Bradford, Skipton (formerly Amblers), Bingley (formerly Pratts), and Doncaster . They were rebranded in 1978.

In 1982 Rackhams Birmingham store became the first to be refurbished under the new plans of House of Fraser. The ground floor completed between 1984 & 85 was expanded at the cost of £6 million. However the Sheffield store was rebranded in 1987 under the House of Fraser brand, and by 2000 all stores were rebranded under House of Fraser or had been closed.

== Relaunch as an online department store ==
In September 2025, the Rackhams name was reintroduced as an online-only department store under new ownership. The new business, operated by Rackhams Retail Ltd, is structured as a digital marketplace platform featuring multiple sellers across fashion, home and lifestyle categories.

Unlike its former incarnation as a chain of department stores, the present company does not operate physical branches. Media reports describe the relaunch as part of a wider trend of heritage retail brands being revived in digital formats.

At launch the online store was reported to host more than 600 partner retailers and over 170,000 products.

== In popular culture ==
To the rear of the Birmingham store was a red light district. As a result, going to the 'Back of Rackhams' became a euphemistic phrase used locally for any involvement in prostitution.

The song Big Store by The Devils is set in Birmingham's Rackhams.

== See also ==
- Rackhams knife attack, a 1994 mass stabbing at the Birmingham store
