= Benzie =

Benzie may refer to:

- Percy Benzie Abery (1876–1948), 20th century Welsh photographer
- Isa Benzie (1902–1988), British radio broadcaster
- Isaac Benzie, founder of a department store in Aberdeen, Scotland
- Benzie County, Michigan, county in the U.S. state of Michigan

== See also ==
- Benzie & Miller, small department store chain in Scotland that became part of House of Fraser in 1958
- Benzi
- Bonzi (disambiguation)
- Bunzi
