= Morgan Squire =

Former department store in Leicester

Morgan Squire was a British department store based in several locations in the city of Leicester. The business was formed in 1846 as a drapery, before going on to be owned by House of Fraser and eventually being rebranded as Rackhams as per House of Fraser's grouping of business in the 1970s.

== History ==
In 1813, Henry Morgan, a draper based in Syston, on the outskirts of Leicester, recruited a young apprentice called William Squire from Heckington in Lincolnshire. By 1846 Morgan and Squire went into partnership and Morgan Squire & Co was created.

The main store was located at the corner of Hotel Street and Millstone Lane, and sold a mixture of clothing and furniture with an upper-class feel, like city rivals Adderlys and Joseph Johnson. The business remained in the Squire family, with William's son Samuel taking over. His son Alfred Morgan Squire eventually took over the business before retiring early and selling it in 1928 to Standard Industrial Trust, an industrial conglomerate that also had purchased Cavendish House, Cheltenham's oldest department store, in the same year.

In 1961, a controlling interest in both Cavendish House Co Ltd and Morgan Squire Ltd was acquired by Swears & Wells Ltd (1926), a London-based company specialising in the development and sale of retail space; however, a year later, Bournemouth-based retail chain J J Allen took control, adding Morgan Squire to its other three department stores. J J Allen was itself purchased in 1970 by House of Fraser, and in 1971 J J Allen's store group was split, with Dingles gaining the West Country department stores, while Morgan Squire was transferred to the Harrods grouping, and rebranded under the grouping name brand name of Rackhams.

== Family History ==
Samuel Squire, son of founder William, built his family home at 1 Salisbury Road in Leicester where he had 17 children with his wife, Anne Marie Starkey Gimson, daughter of renowned industrial designer Ernest Gimson and part of the family that ran Gimson & Son, a Leicester-based engineering firm. 1 Salisbury Road has been part of the University of Leicester since 1948 when the building was purchased after the death of Anne Marie Squire, one of Samuel's children.

Samuel's brother Charles was a prominent lawyer and a member of the Leicester establishment, becoming a city councillor in 1908 and becoming the chairman of the Leicester Libraries and Museum committee, in which position he helped develop the UK's first museum school service, and also saved historical buildings and made them into new museums.

Alfred Squire, who had sold the business in 1928, was the father of the British intelligence officer and Cambridge don Peter Squire.
