= Joseph Porta =

Joseph Porta may refer to:

- Giuseppe Porta (1520–1575), Italian painter
- Joseph Della Porta, an English department store, founded by Joseph Della Porta
