= Arnotts =

Arnotts may refer to:

- Arnott's Group, an Australian biscuit and salted snack food company
- Arnotts (Irish department store), a department store in Dublin
- Arnotts (Scottish department store), a former store in Glasgow
