= Scottish Drapery Corporation =

Scottish company

Scottish Drapery Corporation was a holding company for a group of Scottish department stores and drapers.

== History ==
In 1926 the Scottish Drapery Corporation was created to take over the share capital of several Scottish businesses. They were Pettigrew & Stephens a department store in Glasgow; Patrick Thomson Ltd a department store in Edinburgh; D M Brown Ltd a drapers in Dundee and Watt & Grant Ltd a drapers in Aberdeen. The idea was to increase the buying power and financial resources of the businesses, and were run by John Campbell, who had worked his way up through Pettigrew & Stephens.

The business continued to grow by purchasing a raft of businesses between 1928 and 1950. These were:

- 1928 – J & R Allan Ltd a silk mercers and drapers in Edinburgh
- 1929 – John Falconer & Co Ltd a drapers in Aberdeen
- 1934 – Daly & Sons a department store in Glasgow
- 1936 – J D Blair & Sons Ltd a drapers in Edinburgh
- 1938 – Cochranes Stores Ltd a ladies outfitters in Edinburgh (was incorporated into J D Blair & Sons)
- 1946 – J & S Shannon Ltd a yacht outfitters in Greenock
- 1949 – Reid & Pearson Ltd a drapers in Aberdeen
- 1950 – A & R Milne a drapers in Aberdeen

In 1952, House of Fraser purchased the Scottish Drapery Corporation (which two-thirds of the shares were then held by Debenhams, through its subsidiary the Drapery Trust) merging the individually run businesses into the House of Fraser group. To fund the purchase of the corporation, House of Fraser sold all bar the two department stores property to Legal & General and leased them back at favourable rates.

After the House of Fraser takeover, D M Brown continued to trade under this name until 1972 when it became Arnotts. This closed in 2002 and Reid & Pearson closed in 1960s. J & R Allen was converted into an Arnots during the 1970s but subsequently closed.
