= J F Rockhey =

Former department store in Devon

J F Rockhey was a department store located in Torquay, Devon with a further smaller branch in Newton Abbot.

== History ==
John Fry Rockhey bought a small drapery business on Fleet Street, Torquay from a Mr Peter Thomas in 1881, and set about expanding the business with his partner Mr T S Bulleid. The store grew from the original one to four over the next few years and by 1901 the business was incorporated. John Fry Rockhey was Mayor of Torquay 1896–97 and 1901–02 and was made a Freeman of the City.

Upon the death of J F Rockhey in 1930, his business partner T M Bulleid took over as chairman of the board until his death in 1937, when J F Bulleid took over the reins. He was behind a remodelling of the store which took place between 1939-40. A further store was opened in Newton Abbot.

In 1948, D H Evans purchased the business for £259,556 but continued to operate the business as a separate entity from the Oxford Street store. In 1954, however, Harrods completed the purchase of the entire preference share capital of DH Evans (they had owned the entire ordinary share capital since 1928). House of Fraser purchased the Harrods group in 1959.

J F Rockhey was kept within the Harrods family until 1971, when House of Fraser agreed as part of the takeover of Dingles that all House of Fraser stores in the west country would transfer to the Dingles group.
