= Benza =

Benza is a surname. Notable people with the surname include:

- A. J. Benza (born 1962), American gossip columnist and television host
- Scott Benza (born 1974), visual effects supervisor

== See also ==
- Benzi
- The Benza, Japanese web television comedy
