= Rackhams knife attack =

1994 mass stabbing in Birmingham, England

- Location: Rackhams department store, Birmingham, England
- Date: 8 December 1994
- Target: Women
- Attack type: Attempted mass murder, stabbing
- Weapons: Butcher's knife Bread knife
- Deaths: 0
- Injuries: 15
- Perpetrator: David Cedric Morgan

On 8 December 1994, a knife attack took place at a Rackhams department store in Birmingham, England. 30-year-old David Morgan injured fifteen people by slashing their throats with two knives. Three people were seriously injured and needed surgeries. In addition of those stabbed, five people were treated for shock.

Morgan, referred to by the press as the "Rackhams Slasher", had been diagnosed with schizophrenia and admitted to deliberately targeting women.

== Background ==
David Cedric Morgan was from Birmingham's Aston area. He was schizophrenic and in October 1994, Morgan visited his GP, complaining of "evil thoughts" about attacking women. He had been admitted to the All Saints' Hospital, Winson Green in 1988 following the death of his father, and was diagnosed with schizophrenia and hypomania and depressive psychosis. After treatment psychiatrists said that he had recovered and he was discharged with directions that he should receive support from the community psychiatric team and continue on his course of drugs for three months. In 1992 and 1993, Morgan was twice arrested for attacking women in the street. On both occasions he was conditionally discharged, but the psychiatric services were not alerted and there was no further contact until he visited his GP asking for help in the autumn of 1994.

== Attack ==
On 8 December 1994, the then-30-year-old Morgan visited a Rackhams department store that was packed with Christmas shoppers, wielding a 10-inch-long butcher's knife and a 12-inch bread knife, first attacked manager Karen Crosby, 35, on the Estee Lauder perfume counter at 10:20 am. Jan Twining, 50, was browsing Christmas cards when she felt a tap on her shoulder and turned round, and Morgan slashed her in the neck. Kay Pilkington was slashed in the throat, needing 12 stitches because of the wound. Moving to the jewellery he attacked two more women, chasing one around the store. One victim nearly had her windpipe slashed. Two female security officers who tried to help customers as Morgan attacked them on the floor, were injured. Several of the victims pleaded with Morgan to spare them from his attack.

After slashing 15 women, Morgan was finally accosted by police as he wandered around the first floor. Keith Hart, 43, armed himself with a golf club from the store's sports department. He managed to subdue Morgan, along with 38-year-old Sgt James Lavery, by firstly ordering him to put his weapon down. Morgan later told police he had come to the store "to cut someone".

== Aftermath ==
Morgan was arrested and brought to court, and despite a disagreement between his legal team and the NHS, it was later determined by a psychologist that Morgan was vulnerable and isolated but apparently suffered from no mental illnesses. Morgan was sentenced to life imprisonment in February 1996. He admitted to nine offences of wounding with intent to cause grievous bodily harm and one of assault. The judge told Morgan that "There can be no doubt that you are an extremely dangerous man. It is certain you must be detained until you cease to represent a risk to public safety – if that time never comes, so be it." He also recommended that Morgan not be put forward for parole before serving at least 12 years in prison.

In 2002, he was transferred from the Broadmoor Hospital to a medium security unit where he would be allowed on escorted shopping trips as part of rehabilitation. In 2006, Morgan, then 43 years old, was released into the community to go shopping. At the time he was being treated at the Stafford's St George's Hospital. A documentary from World in Action about Morgan, titled "Terror in Store", was made shortly after his conviction and sentencing in 1996.

== See also ==
- 2016 St. Cloud, Minnesota knife attack, a mall mass stabbing in the United States
