= Kendals =

Former department store in Manchester

Coordinates: 53.4818°N 2.2479°W

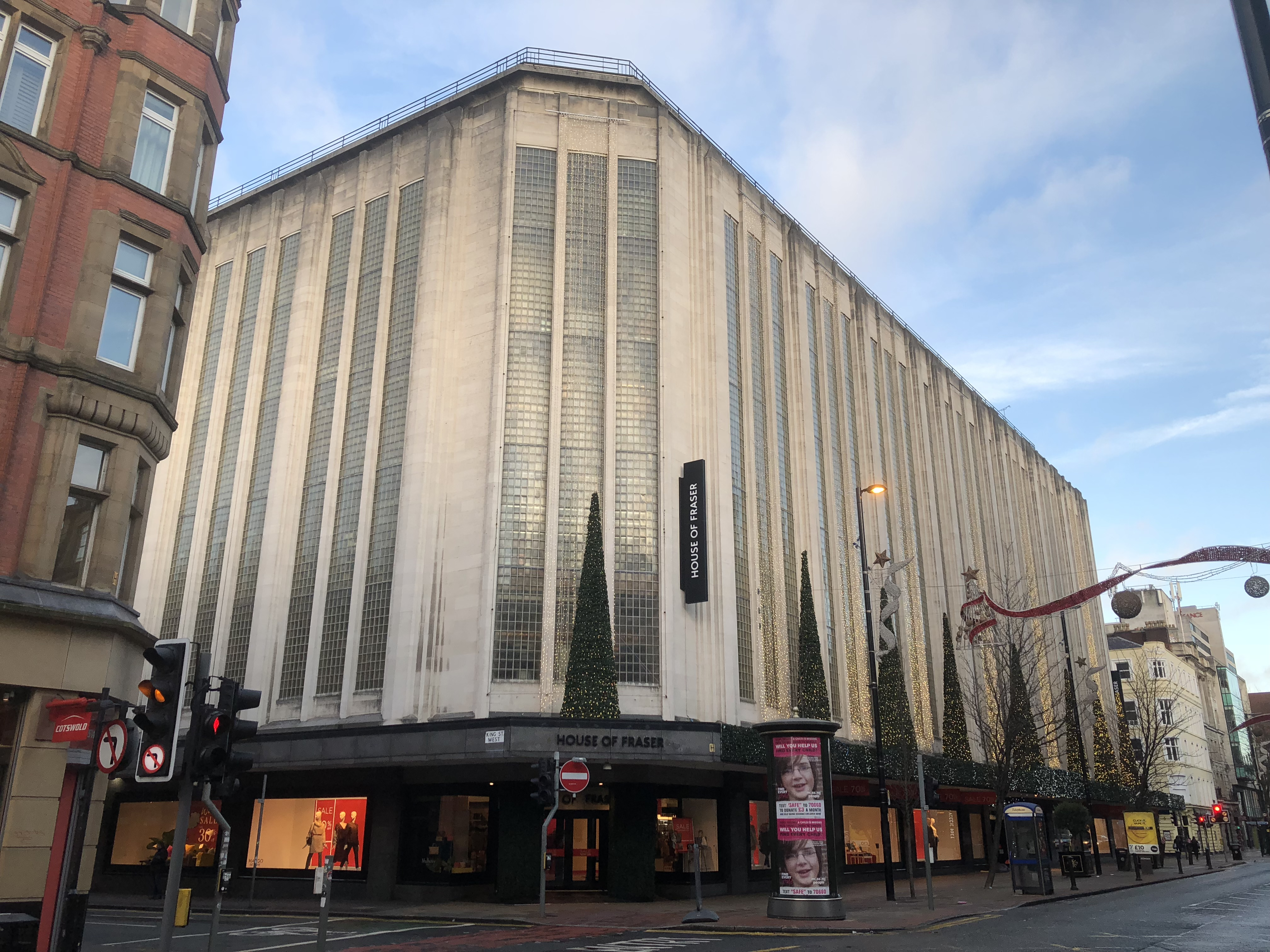
- Company type: Private company
- Industry: Retail
- Genre: Department store
- Founded: 1836; 190 years ago
- Headquarters: 98–116 Deansgate, Manchester, England
- Products: Quality and luxury goods
- Owner: Mike Ashley

Kendals is the previous name of a department store in Manchester, England. Since 2005, the store now operates as House of Fraser. The store had previously been known during its operation as Kendal Milne, Kendal, Milne & Co, Kendal, Milne & Faulkner, Harrods or Watts.

== History ==
The store was opened as Watts' in 1796, and became Kendal, Milne & Faulkner when three employees bought out the business and re-opened it in 1836. The founder John Watts had begun a drapery business in Deansgate in 1796 which became prosperous and was later known as "The Bazaar" and expanded onto a site on the other side of Deansgate. The store building of 1836 (on the east side) was reconstructed after the street widening of 1873 by the architect E. J. Thompson. The site of the present store was occupied by the cabinet showrooms, workshops and packing departments.

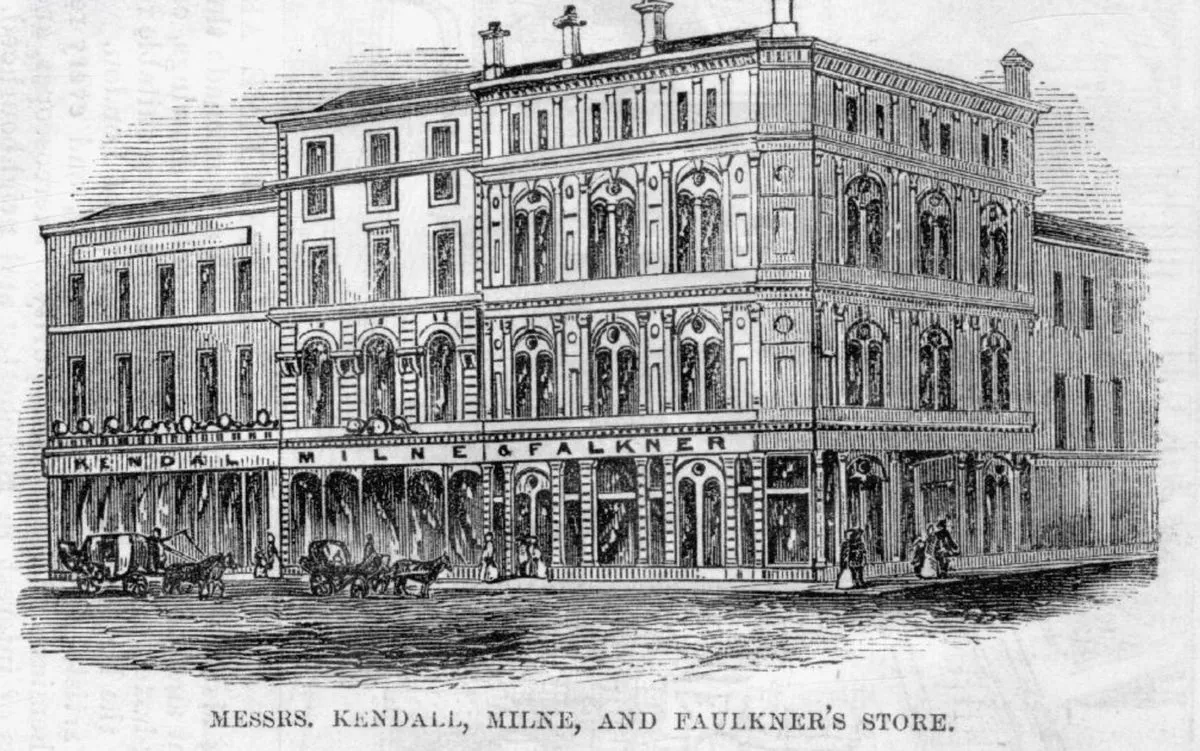
Kendals department store, in the 1860s.

It was purchased by Harrods in 1919, and was called Harrods for a period in the 1920s, but the name swiftly reverted to Kendal Milne following protests from customers and staff. Store receipts and advertising continued to call the store 'Kendal Milne and Company (Harrods Limited)' until Harrods' acquisition by House of Fraser in 1959. As late as the early 1980's Kendal's livery and carrier bags were the same olive green and gold as Harrods. For many years the store was (alongside Marshall & Snelgrove - in St. Anne's Square and Finnigan's - further down Deansgate) the epitome of luxury department store shopping in Manchester.

The Harrods group, along with Kendals, was taken over by House of Fraser in 1959. The store continued trading as Kendals until 2005, when the store was renamed House of Fraser Manchester. Despite the re-branding of Kendals, the 'Kendal, Milne and Co' name is still clearly visible on marble fascias above the store's entrances.

The store is located in a purpose-built Art Deco building on Deansgate, with 280,000 sq ft (26,000 m^{2}) of retail space, making it Manchester's largest department store (the previous largest being Debenhams on Market Street until its closure in 2021) at 420,000 sq ft (39,000 m^{2}). The present store was designed by Harrods' in-house architect, Louis David Blanc, with input from a local architect J. S. Beaumont, in 1938 and completed in 1939. It is a Grade II listed building. It operated for many years alongside the Victorian store building on the opposite side of Deansgate (opened in 1873). The two buildings were linked by a subterranean passage, 'Kendal's Arcade' but this was closed off when the buildings on the East side of Deansgate were sold. A large multi-storey car park stands to the west of the store.

In October 2018, it was announced that the House of Fraser store would close in late January 2019 due to being unable to sort out a crucial restructuring deal. However in November 2018 it was announced that the store had been saved from closure.

In October 2020, plans emerged which suggest the store will close once and for all, with the store refurbished, extended and repurposed as offices. Manchester City Council approved the plans in June 2021. The multi-storey car park to the west would be demolished and replaced by further office space and public realm created between the two buildings.

== See also ==
- Listed buildings in Manchester-M3
