= Patrick Thomson =

Former department store in Edinburgh

Patrick Thomson was a department store located at the southern end of North Bridge in Edinburgh. In 1952, its parent company the Scottish Drapery Corporation was purchased by House of Fraser.

== History ==
Patrick Thomson opened a small haberdashery and drapery shop on South Bridge in 1889. The shop became so popular they moved from the South Bridge site to a larger store at 15 North Bridge. This allowed the business to grow to become a larger department store expanding to 60 departments, competing with rivals Jenners, R W Forsyth and Robert Maule & Son on Princes Street, J & R Allan and Peter Allan on South Bridge, Goldbergs on Tollcross and Parkers on Bristo Street.

In 1926, the store was purchased by the newly formed holding company Scottish Drapery Corporation, and Patrick Thomson's or PTs. as it was affectionally known marketed itself as The Shopping Centre of Scotland. In 1952, the Scottish Drapery Corporation was purchased by House of Fraser and Patrick Thomson continued to operate.

However, with the re-organisation of House of Fraser in the 1970s to several operating brands, Patrick Thomson was closed and re-opened as an Arnotts in 1976. The store continued to operate as an Arnotts until it was closed in 1982. In 1984 the building was re-opened as the Carlton Hotel.
