= C.banner =

Chinese fashion conglomerate

C.banner is a Chinese fashion conglomerate based in Nanjing. The company originally sold footwear, but has gradually expanded its reach to owning brands such as Hamleys, MIO, and United Nude.

It is the second largest mid to premium retailer for women's casual and formal wear in China.

== House of Fraser ==
Britain's House of Fraser said it would close some of its stores as a condition of securing new funds from international retailer C.banner (1028.HK), which will become the majority owner of the department stores group with a 51 percent stake.

As of August 2018, C.banner have withdrawn from buying House of Fraser, causing the stores to go further into administration.
