= Dalys =

Former department store in Glasgow

Dalys was one of the 11 department stores of Glasgow, located on what was the grand Sauchiehall Street. The store became part of the Scottish Drapery Corporation, which was in turn purchased by House of Fraser.

== History ==
Daly's started out as James Daly, Son & Niven in 1846 as a drapers based in Argyle Street (known as Daly's Tron House). By 1880 the son was dropped from the name of the business, however only four years later the partnership was dissolved and the business continued to trade as James Daly & Co.

At the same time as the partnership broke up the store moved from 32 Argyll Street to 60-62 Trongate, however this was a short term move as 8 years later the store again moved to its final home at 199 Sauchiehall Street. The store expanded from a drapery business into a full blown department store, taking over properties next door right up to number 217 Sauchiehall Street (1928), home to the former Willow Tea Rooms.

In 1934 the business was purchased by the Scottish Drapery Corporation whom renamed the store Daly & Sons. The business stayed as an independent company run by the Daly family under the corporation's wing, until 1952 when the Scottish Drapery Corporation was purchased by House of Fraser. The company Daly & Sons was liquidated, however the store continued to operate under the Daly's brand until 1979 when the store was closed and redeveloped as retail space.
