= Isaac Benzie =

Former department store in Aberdeen

Isaac Benzie was a department store located in Aberdeen, Scotland.

== History ==
Isaac Benzie in 1894 opened a small drapery store at 185 George Street, Aberdeen, after serving an apprenticeship in a general merchant's shop in the village of Oyne. The business grew and moved to bigger premises in Gallowgate and further premises being opened selling additional goods across Aberdeen and a hosiery factory in Concert Court.

In 1922 the business was incorporated and in 1924 the stores were all brought together under one roof at 143-167 George Street. However Isaac Benzie died in 1926, and his sons Isaac Junior and Athol then ran the business.

In 1935 Isaac Junior died, leaving his brother to run the company, which he did until he retired in 1955. Upon his retirement he sold the business to House of Fraser, who continued to trade under the Isaac Benzie name until 1972 when the business was transferred into the new Arnotts division and took the Arnotts name. The store continued to operate as an Arnotts until it was closed by House of Fraser in 1986.
