= Hammonds of Hull =

Former department store in Hull

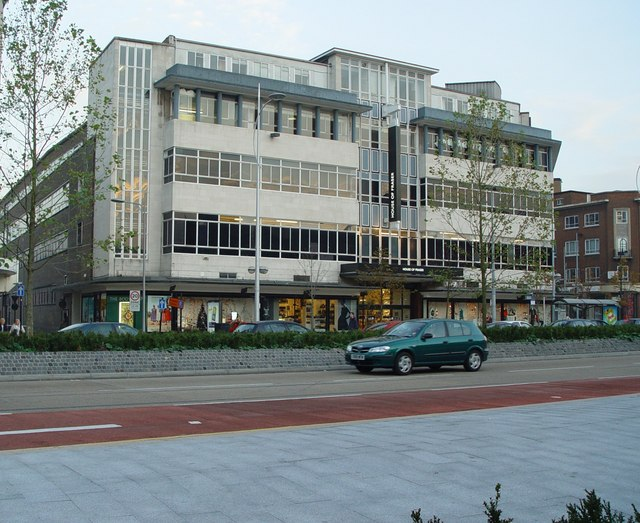
The former Hammonds building in Hull as House of Fraser in 2007

Hammonds of Hull was a department store with the original business located in Hull before opening a further branch in Bridlington. The business was later bought by House of Fraser. As of September 2021, the building in Ferensway is being renovated to re-open to the public as an artisan food hall at ground level including space for independent non-food retailers, and with rentable office space above.

== History ==
In 1821 H W Hammond opened a drapery shop on the old North Bridge in Hull. The business continued to operate at this location until 1861 when the store moved to Osborne Street. In 1889 the business was sold to James Powell and his three sons, whose family continued to operate the business until 1972. The business was incorporated in 1913.

Due to the growth of Hull, a new store was built in 1916 with modern lifts and a large restaurant. This was further improved before the Second World War with the addition on an escalator and a third storey. However the store was destroyed by German bombing in May 1941, but within a week 47 of the store's departments were open again in a temporary location.

The store was not rebuilt until 1952 on Paragon Square to designs by T. P. Bennett, with extensions added in 1954 and 1957. Within a couple of years the business had grown again by opening its own hairdressing salon, and in 1960 added a new warehouse to accommodate their furniture workshops and stock rooms. This itself was extended within four years, while a fourth floor was added to the main store.

In 1969 the business purchased the Carltons department store located in Bridlington, and within a year had demolished and rebuilt the store. The company's independence did not last much longer, as in 1972 House of Fraser purchased the business for £8 million. The stores were then grouped under the Binns brand. The Bridlington store was closed in 1995 and the store stood empty for three years until Boyes opened in 1998. The Hull store was re-branded under the House of Fraser name and closed in August 2019 after the Sports Direct takeover of the group.
