= House of Fraser =

British department store group

House of Fraser Limited
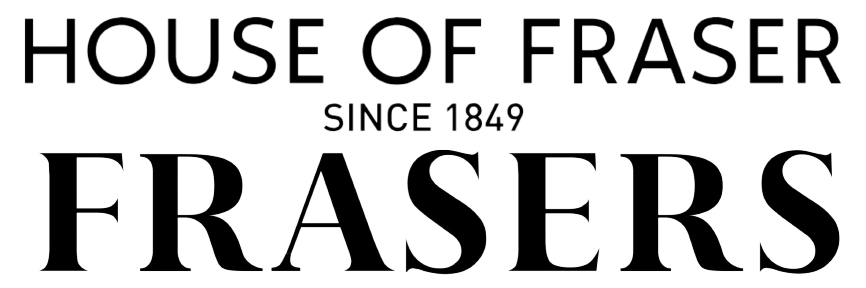
- House of Fraser logo (above) and Frasers logo (below)

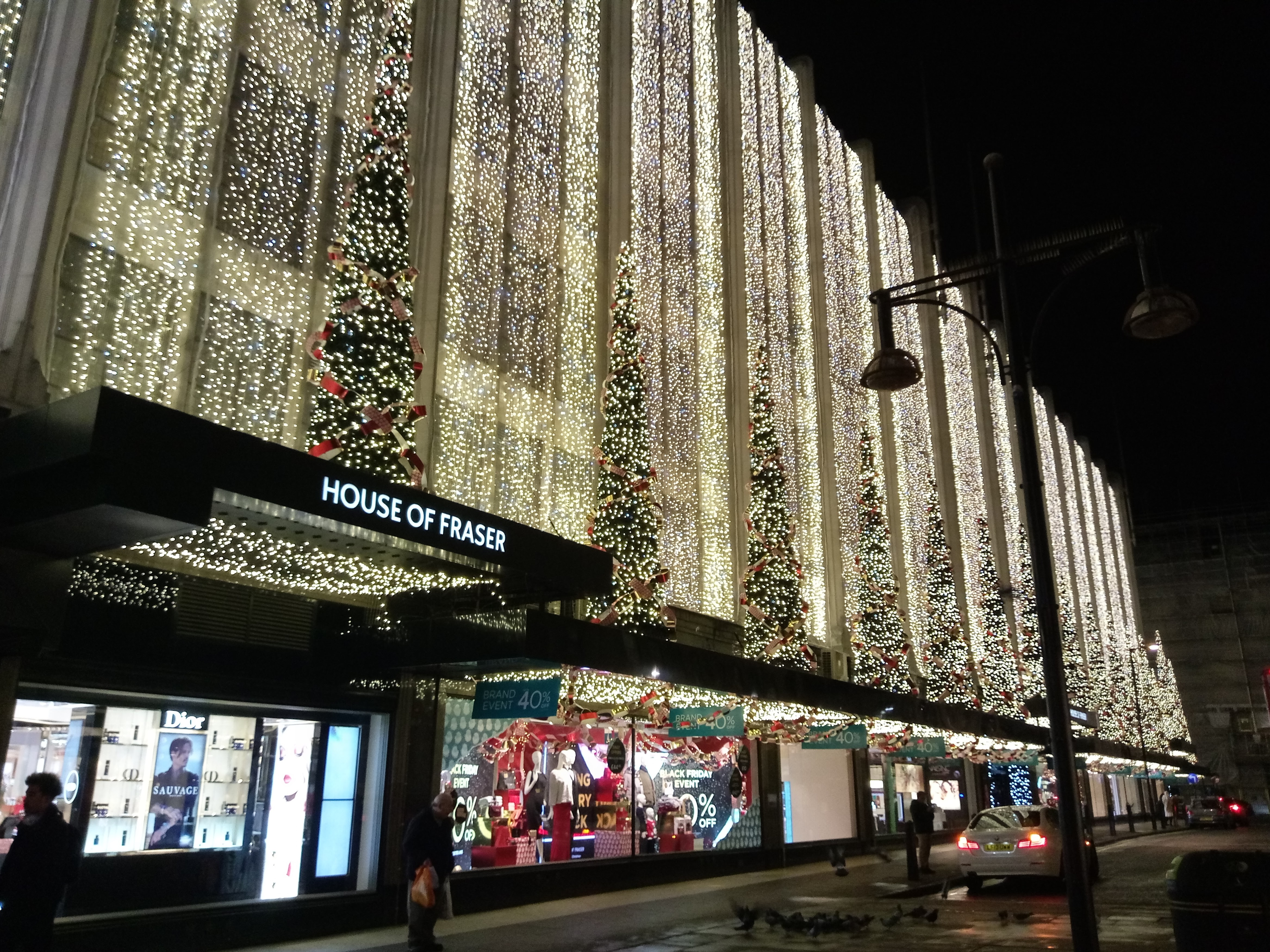
- House of Fraser in London at Christmas (2017)
- Trade name: House of Fraser; Frasers
- Type: Subsidiary
- Industry: Retail
- Genre: Department stores
- Founded: 1849; 177 years ago in Glasgow, Scotland
- Founder: Hugh Fraser; James Arthur
- Headquarters: Shirebrook, England
- Number of locations: 21 (17: Frasers) (4: House Of Fraser)
- Area served: United Kingdom; Ireland
- Revenue: ▲£363.5 million (2022)
- Operating income: ▲£142.5 million (2022)
- Net income: ▲£20.657 million (2022)
- Number of employees: 6,000 direct 11,500 concession
- Parent: Frasers Group
- Website: houseoffraser.co.uk

House of Fraser (in the process of rebranding to Frasers) is a British department store chain with 21 locations across the United Kingdom and Ireland, part of Frasers Group. It was established in Glasgow, Scotland, in 1849 as Arthur and Fraser. By 1891, it was known as Fraser & Sons. The company grew steadily during the early 20th century and in 1936 began a period of growth through acquisition which would continue for over forty years. House of Fraser Ltd was incorporated in 1941 and first listed on the London Stock Exchange six years later.

After the Second World War a large number of acquisitions transformed the company into a national chain. Purchases included Scottish Drapery Corporation (1952), Binns (1953), Barkers of Kensington (1957) and the Harrods group (1959). Later acquisitions included J J Allen (1969), Dingles (1971), Howells of Cardiff (1972) and Army & Navy Stores (1973).

The group was purchased by the Al Fayed family in 1985 for £615 million, beating out Tiny Rowland for control. By 1993, the management of the group were making attempts to purchase the group from the Al Fayeds, and a floatation was agreed, with the group initially trading separately as House of Fraser Holdings with the Fayed group.

The public float happened in 1995, when it was listed in the FTSE Index as House of Fraser plc, with Harrods moved into the private ownership of the Al Fayeds.

In the 1990s, several stores were closed and fifteen stores transferred to a joint venture with British Land Company, which then continued operating under their old name. The former Harrods group store D H Evans on Oxford Street, London was re-branded as House of Fraser in 2001 and became the chain's flagship store.

In 2005, the group acquired Jenners (£46m), and Beatties (£69m). In 2006, the firm was acquired by a consortium of investors (Highland Group Holdings) including Icelandic based Landsbanki (35%). An online store was launched in 2007. In 2014, the group (as Highland Group Holdings Ltd) was sold to Nanjing Xinjiekou Department Store Co. (Sanpower Group), a leading chain of Chinese department stores for approximately £450 million. In May 2018, the group entered a company voluntary arrangement, and in June the closure of 31 stores was announced. On 10 August 2018, Mike Ashley's Sports Direct International agreed to buy the business's assets (stores, stock, brand) for £90 million after the chain went into administration earlier that day. In 2023, it was announced that the business would re-brand under the Frasers name-plate after a successful trial.

== History ==
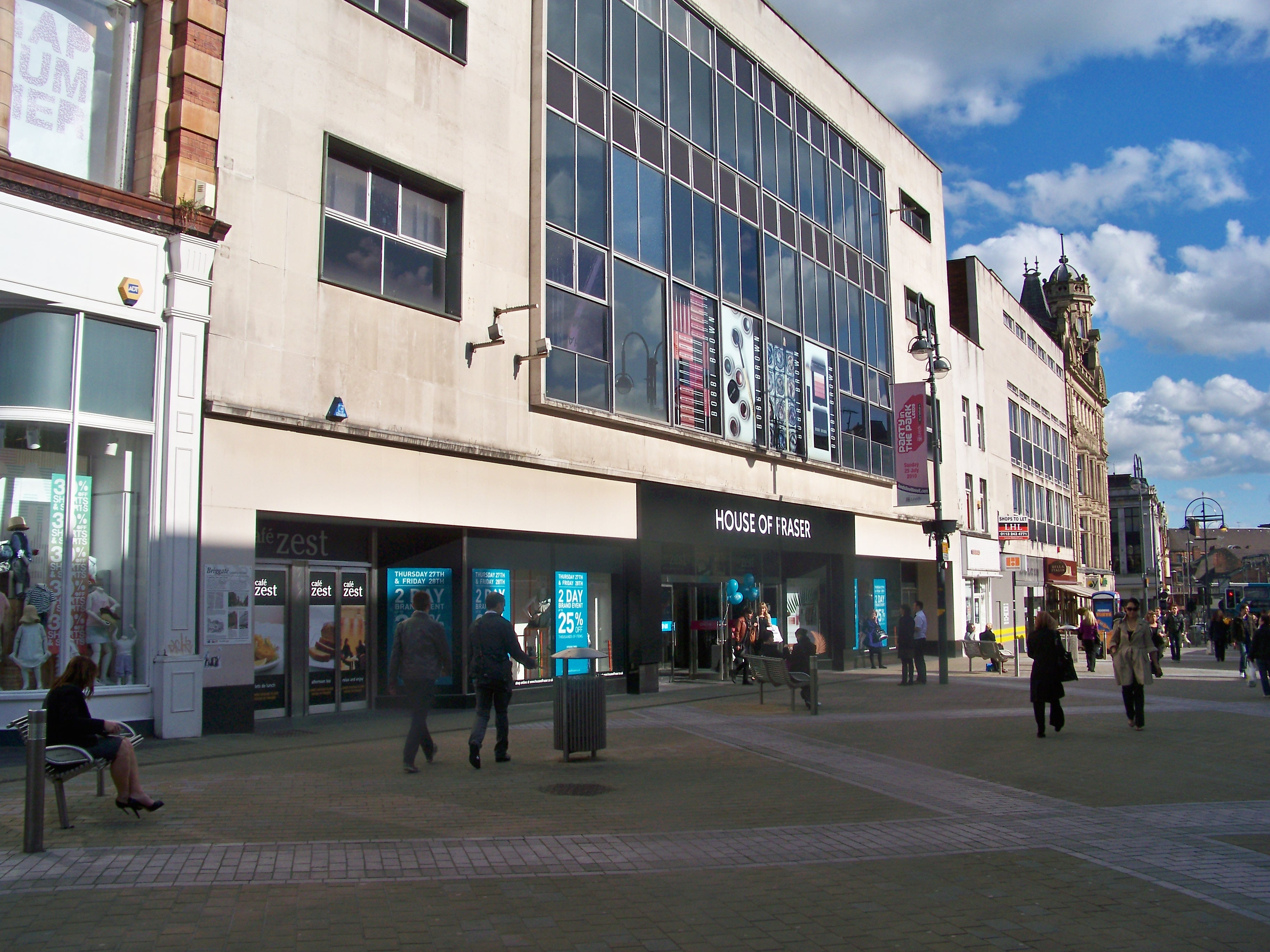
House of Fraser on Briggate in Leeds, England

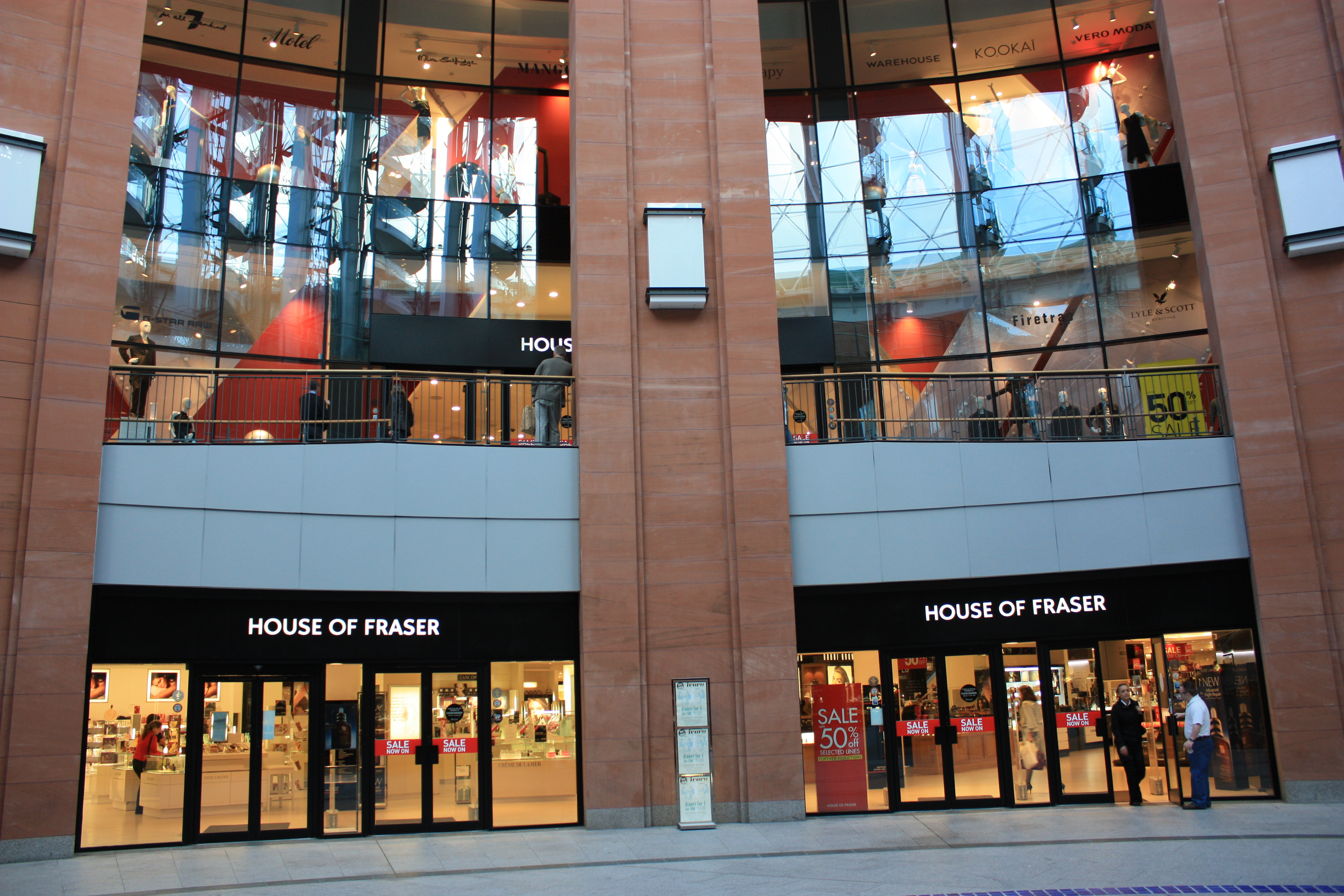
House of Fraser in Victoria Square Shopping Centre in Belfast, Northern Ireland (now Frasers)

=== The early years ===
The company was founded by Hugh Fraser and James Arthur in 1849 as a small drapery shop on the corner of Argyle Street and Buchanan Street in Glasgow, Lanarkshire, Scotland, trading as Arthur and Fraser. Hugh Fraser had been apprenticed to Stewart & McDonald Ltd, a Glasgow drapery warehouse where he eventually rose to the position of warehouse manager. It was from here that he brought many of his new company's initial customers. James Arthur also owned a retail drapery business in Paisley, a Greater Glasgow suburb: he appointed a manager to oversee the Paisley business while he focused on his new business.

The company established a wholesale trade in adjoining premises in Argyle Street. In 1856 the wholesale business moved to a larger site in Miller Street, Glasgow, and started to trade under the name Arthur & Co. The retail side of the business expanded into the vacant buildings left by the wholesale side.

During the late 1850s and early 1860s, the retail business was run by a professional manager – first Thomas Kirkpatrick and then Alexander McLaren. In 1865 the partnership between the partners was dissolved and Fraser assumed control of the retail business leaving Arthur with the wholesale business. In 1865 McLaren joined the retail business and the name was changed to Fraser & McLaren.

=== Fraser & Sons ===
When the first Hugh Fraser died in 1873, his three eldest sons, James, John and Hugh, acquired stakes in the business. James and John Fraser were initially directors in the business and employed Alexander McLaren and later John Towers to manage it for them. In 1891 Hugh also joined the partnership which by then was called Fraser & Sons.

In 1879, the current flagship store on Oxford Street in London was opened by Dan Harries Evans, a 23-year-old from Whitemill in Carmarthenshire, Wales who had previously been apprenticed to a draper in Forest Hamlet near Merthyr Tydfil, Wales. He moved to London in 1878 to set up his own business in Westminster Bridge Road. The store traded under the D H Evans name until 2001.

By 1900, Hugh Fraser II was in charge: he incorporated the business as Fraser & Sons Ltd in 1909 and introduced the famous stag's head motif.

After Hugh Fraser II died in 1927, his son Hugh Fraser III, an accountant, became chairman of the business. He opened new departments, enlarged the tearoom, opened a restaurant and also began to look at possible acquisitions. In 1936 he purchased Arnott & Co Ltd and its neighbour Robert Simpson & Sons Ltd in nearby Argyle Street, merging the companies to help improve trade. In 1948 the company, now named House of Fraser, was first listed on the London Stock Exchange.

=== 1950s to 1970s ===
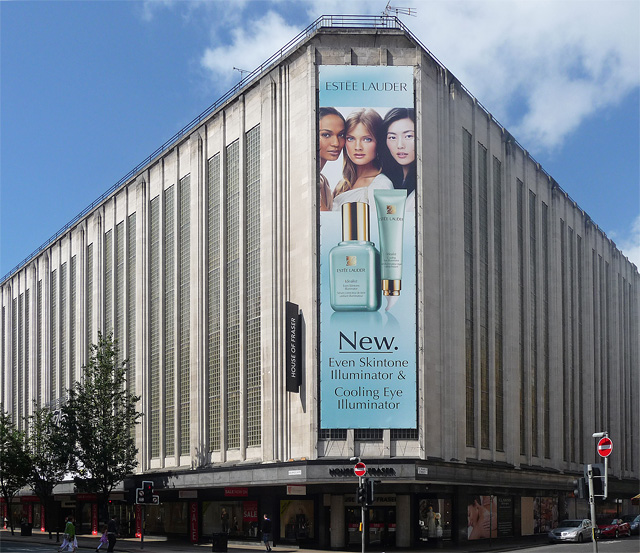
The Art Deco Kendals building on Deansgate, Manchester, England – a House of Fraser store since 1959

In 1951, the Company purchased McDonald's Ltd, and with it a branch in Harrogate. Fraser then purchased the Scottish Drapery Corporation in 1952, followed by the Sunderland based Binns group of stores in 1953.

Fraser sold the property sites to insurance companies, leasing them back for long terms at advantageous rates. This enabled the release of capital for the purchase of new premises and the modernisation of existing stores. In 1957, the Kensington store group of John Barker & Co Ltd was acquired and in 1959 Harrods and Dickins & Jones also joined the Group.

Sir Hugh Fraser succeeded his father as chairman of the company when his father died in 1966. Sir Hugh resumed the expansion of the company in 1969 with the takeover of J. J. Allen Ltd, a Bournemouth based group, also including Colsons of Exeter and Brights of Bristol and Bournemouth.

During the 1970s, the House of Fraser Group acquired more companies including T. Baird & Sons Ltd of Scotland, Switzer & Co. Ltd of Dublin, Ireland, and E. Dingle & Co. Ltd, Chiesmans Ltd, Hide & Co and the Army & Navy Stores in southern England, as well as a number of independent stores, totaling over fifty stores during the decade. In 1973, the House of Fraser Group was considering merging with the British pharmacy company Boots, and was even subject to a written answer in the House of Commons. The government decided to block the proposed merger in 1974.

=== 1980–1985 ===
In 1981, Roland Smith succeeded Sir Hugh Fraser as chairman. A takeover bid by Lonrho was referred to the Monopolies and Mergers Commission and declared to be contrary to the public interest. Four new stores opened between 1980 and 1984, including D H Evans in Wood Green, North London in 1980, Dickins & Jones in Milton Keynes in 1981, Frasers in Perth in April 1984, and Army & Navy in Epsom, Surrey in May 1984.

The company, by then House of Fraser PLC, diversified into sports goods under the name of Astral Sports and Leisure (subsequently sold to Sears plc, owned Olympus Sport division) and into funerals with Wylie & Lochhead. It also launched the 'You' range of cosmetics and jewellery shops, and in 1985 acquired Turnbull & Asser Holdings Ltd, shirt makers of Jermyn Street, London and Kurt Geiger Holdings Ltd, shoe retailers. Other developments during the 1980s included the introduction of "Lifestyle" merchandise ranges and a huge investment in store refurbishment nationwide. In 1983 the Company introduced the Frasercard (later renamed Recognition), valid at all stores, and administered from a central facility based in Swindon.

=== 1985–2006: Al Fayed ownership ===
In 1985, the Al Fayed family bought the business for £615 million. The Al Fayeds supported the continuing expansion of the company and replaced the stag's head logo with a stag leaping from a green triangle with shop signs of this period using a double-layered sans-serif typeface. In 1988, a five-year strategic business plan was announced which saw a rationalisation of stores. Small branches were to be relinquished and replaced with larger units.

In September 1990, two new department stores were opened, a House of Fraser in the Meadowhall Shopping Centre in Sheffield, and Schofields in Leeds. In 1991, a new House of Fraser store was opened at the Lakeside Shopping Centre in West Thurrock, Essex.

In 1994, before House of Fraser PLC was relisted on the London Stock Exchange, Harrods was moved out of the Group so that it could remain under the private ownership of the Al Fayed family. John Coleman, who was appointed chief executive of the House of Fraser Group in 1996, launched the Linea brand in 1997, along with Platinum and Fraser the following year. The House of Fraser logo was revised in 1996 with the leaping stag now going over an "F" shadow and shop signs using a serif typeface. There were many store closures in this period which included the closure or selling off of branches in locations including Sheffield (House of Fraser), Newcastle (Binns), Sunderland (Binns), Bradford (Rackhams) and Leeds (Schofields which had closed only six years after opening although House of Fraser continued to have a presence with their Rackhams (now House of Fraser store) in the city) with the loss of around 1,000 jobs.

House of Fraser set up BL Fraser, a 50–50 joint venture with the British Land Company, in 1999 to buy 15 House of Fraser stores that would continue to be operated by House of Fraser. The Company added to its private-label brands in 2000 with House of Fraser womenswear, The Collection menswear, and a Linea Home.

In 2003, Tom Hunter put forward a hostile bid for the Group, with the possible intention to merge with Allders, another department store in which he had shareholdings. In addition, there was a large reduction in the number of House of Fraser stores in Scotland which included the sell off or closure of branches in Aberdeen (Frasers), Dundee (Arnotts), Inverness (Frasers), Paisley (Arnotts) and Perth (Frasers).

In 2005, the House of Fraser acquired the four Jenners department stores in April for £46m, and Beatties, a mainly Midlands based department store chain of 12 sites, for £69.3m in the summer of 2005. In addition to buying companies, House of Fraser continued its own development programme and opened several more stores including its first store outside the UK (since the disposal of the Switzer business in Ireland in 1991) in Dundrum Town Centre, Dublin, Ireland. as well as stores in Maidstone and Norwich.

In 2006, the Company consolidated its portfolio by closing the 135-year-old Barkers business in Kensington High Street on 2 January 2006. and on 14 January 2006, closed its Dickins & Jones store in London's Regent Street following a substantial rent increase. In addition, the Company closed its Birmingham Beatties store in January 2006 (although retained the House of Fraser store in Birmingham).

=== 2006–2014: Highland Group Holdings ===
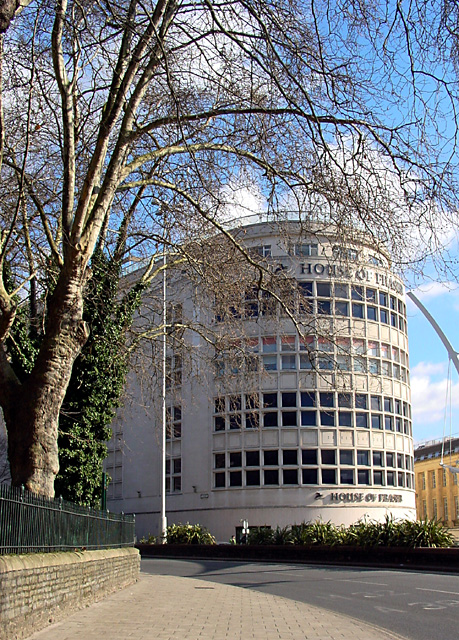
House of Fraser in Broadmead, Bristol in 2006

In February 2006, the Group announced that it had received a preliminary bid approach valuing it at £300 million and, in August 2006, the House of Fraser confirmed a takeover approach from the Highland consortium who acquired the company for £351.4 million in November 2006. Highland Group Holdings Limited was 35% owned by Landsbanki. As part of the Highland takeover all brand names for their stores, including most of the Beatties branches, would be replaced with the House of Fraser name (with the exception of Jenners) with the stag logo axed and a new sans-serif typeface used on shop signs.

In September 2007, House of Fraser launched its online store.

The company had four major openings in 2008, including its first store in Northern Ireland in the newly built Victoria Square Shopping Centre, Belfast in March. At 120,000 sq ft (11,000 m^{2}) it was the largest store that House of Fraser had opened (as opposed to taken over) in the UK. Also in March 2008, the Company opened a 95,000 sq ft (8,800 m^{2}) store in High Wycombe. On 25 September 2008 the Company opened a 100,000 sq ft (9,300 m^{2}) store in the Cabot Circus development in Bristol, and a branch in Westfield London, a new 70,000 sq ft (6,500 m^{2}) store, on 30 October 2008.

House of Fraser launched the HouseofFraser.com "Buy & Collect" concept shop in October 2011 with its first location in Aberdeen. A further site, in Liverpool, opened in 2012. These small shops were equipped with computer terminals to allow customers to order from the House of Fraser website. Both shops had closed by the summer of 2016.

In December 2013, talks to takeover House of Fraser were held by French department store Galeries Lafayette with House of Fraser also exploring a floating on the London Stock Exchange once more in the summer of 2014 if the takeover was to be abandoned.

=== 2014–2018: Sanpower Group ownership ===
In April 2014, it was reported by BBC News that House of Fraser would be sold to Chinese conglomerate Sanpower Group, who would obtain 89% share in the company which would value the business at about £450 million. Nanjing Xinjiekou Department Store Co will buy an 89% stake in Highland Group Holdings Ltd, which owns House of Fraser. The purchase was worth £450 million. Sanpower Group is a 22 per cent shareholder of the Nanjing Xinjiekou Department Store Co. On 2 September 2014. Don McCarthy, retiring Executive Chairman of House of Fraser, announced the completion of the sale of 100% of the preferred ordinary shares and B ordinary shares, and approximately 89% of the A ordinary shares and preference shares of Highland Group Holdings Ltd, to Nanjing Xinjiekou Department Store Co, a leading chain of Chinese department stores and part of the Sanpower Group, for an enterprise value of approximately £480 million.

In 2017, a new department store opened at the Rushden Lakes development in Rushden, Northamptonshire. The closure of House of Fraser Outlet in Leicester also took place during the year and a further closure, in Aylesbury, was announced for 2018, however, this never materialised following the acquisition by Sports Direct International. A new store in Chester was announced in February 2017 with construction due to start in mid-2018. It was announced later in 2018 that House of Fraser had pulled out of these plans due to their financial issues.

=== 2018: Administration ===
On 2 May 2018, the company announced that it was to be entering into a conditional sale of a controlling stake in the firm to Nanjing Cenbest (another Sanpower Group subsidiary) to Hamleys owner C.banner, another Chinese firm. A condition of the sale that the company streamline its existing store portfolio and cost base was set out. The intention to launch a company voluntary arrangement (CVA) was announced on the same day. However, C.banner later pulled out.

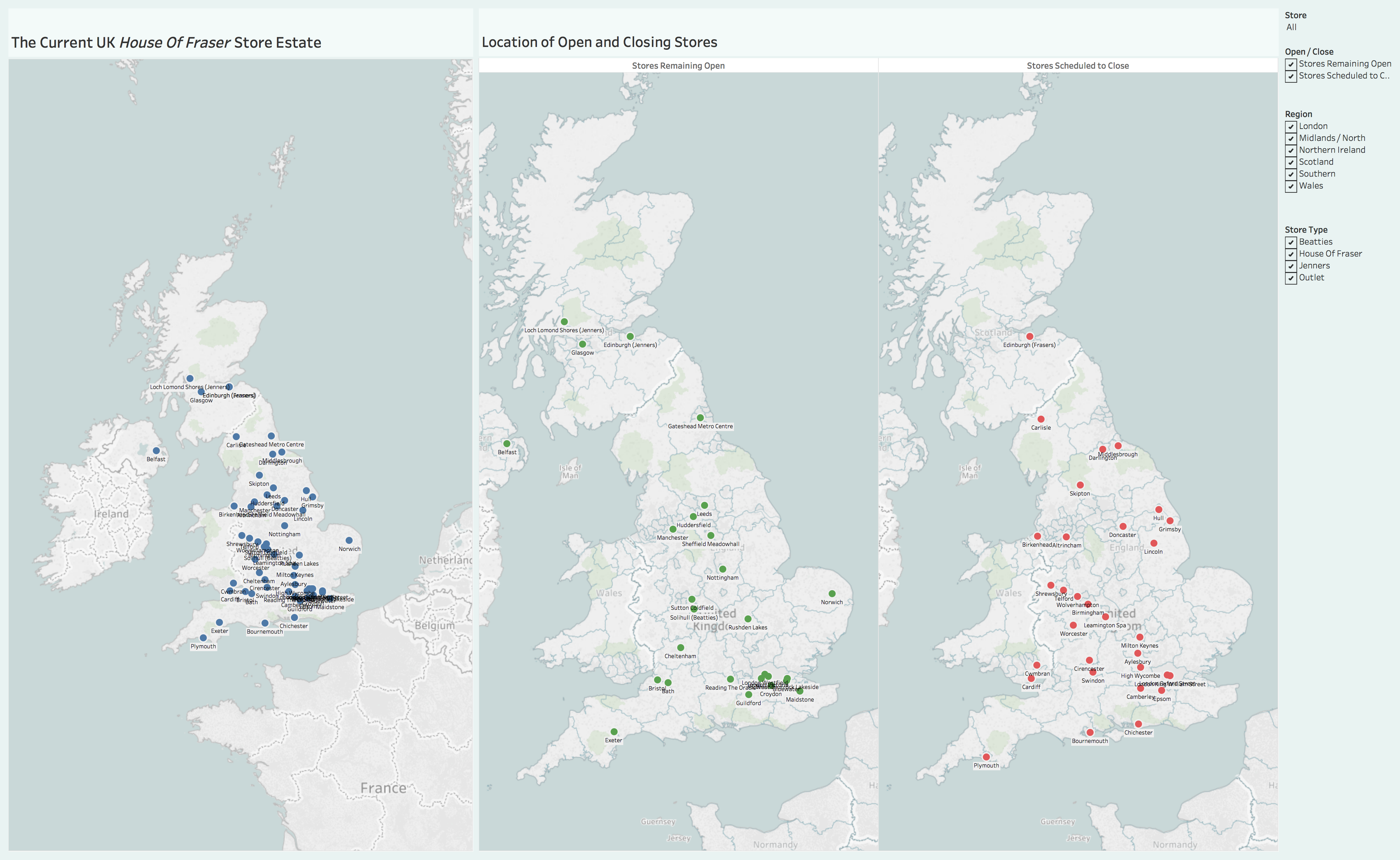
Location of House of Fraser UK Store Estate and those planned for closure in the announcement on 7 June 2018

On 7 June 2018, the company announced that it would close 31 of its 58 UK stores:

Altrincham • Aylesbury • Birkenhead • Birmingham • Bournemouth • Camberley • Cardiff • Carlisle • Chichester • Cirencester • Cwmbran • Darlington • Doncaster • Edinburgh Frasers • Epsom • Grimsby • High Wycombe • Hull • Leamington Spa • Lincoln • London Oxford Street • London King William Street • Middlesbrough • Milton Keynes • Plymouth • Shrewsbury • Skipton • Swindon • Telford • Wolverhampton • Worcester

This included the flagship Oxford Street branch and the largest store, Birmingham, to be closed by January 2019. Richard Lim of Retail Economics said that it remained "hard to know with any certainty just what will happen next at House of Fraser" but that without any external funding within a matter of weeks it would inevitably fall into administration. Before the intended closures the company employed 6,000 people directly, with another 11,500 employed through concessions. The subsequent administration of the business meant the CVA and associated plans for restructuring (including the previously announced store closures) came to an abrupt end.

=== 2018–present: Under Frasers Group ===
On 10 August 2018, House of Fraser entered administration. Later that day Sports Direct International agreed to buy the business' assets (brand, stock, stores) for £90 million in cash on a pre-packaged insolvency basis. Soon after the acquisition many store closures were announced however after months of negotiations almost all were saved. Despite most assets being saved, its corporate identity, having over £400m worth of debt, was not part of the deal.

House of Fraser purchased its Glasgow store building for £95 million in October 2018 and the company pledged to restore it and turn it into the 'Harrods of the north'.

It was reported in May 2019 that seven House of Fraser stores were going to be rebranded into the new 'Frasers' nameplate, a new upmarket chain by the brand (at the time only the Glasgow flagship operated co-branded under the Frasers name).

In July 2019 Sports Direct International expressed regret over its purchase of House of Fraser and problems at the company were described as "nothing short of terminal"; it was also announced that future store closures were planned. Mike Ashley (CEO of Sports Direct) attributed the collapse of HoF to the "incompetence of previous management".

Sports Direct International was rebranded to Frasers Group in December 2019. The interim results in December showed signs of recovery.

The first Frasers store opened on 17 October 2021 at Mander Centre in Wolverhampton.

In November 2021 HoF was given an eviction notice by their Oxford Street store's landlord with plans for the building to be redeveloped into leisure, office and retail spaces. The store was closed in January 2022.

By July 2023 House of Fraser stores had almost halved in number from fifty-nine in August 2018 to just thirty-one locations.

Michael Murray (Frasers Group CEO) confirmed in October 2023 that over time all remaining House of Fraser stores would convert to Frasers or would close.

The House of Fraser app, website and all social media were rebranded in August 2024 to Frasers.

== Branches ==
Currently House of Fraser, Frasers and Frasers Outlet operate 21 stores around the United Kingdom and Ireland.

=== Currently operating ===
==== House of Fraser: 4 locations ====
- Aylesbury (formerly Beatties; acquired 2005)
- Croydon (opened 2004)
- Manchester (formerly Kendals / Kendal Milne / Kendal, Milne & Co.; acquired 1959)
- Sutton Coldfield (formerly Beatties; acquired 2005)

==== Frasers: 16 locations ====
- Balloch, Loch Lomond Shores (formerly Jenners; acquired 2005)
- Belfast (formerly House of Fraser; opened 2008)
- Blackpool (opened 22 November 2023 in premises previously occupied by Debenhams)
- Cork, Mahon Point (opened 3 November 2022 in premises previously occupied by Debenhams)
- Derby (opened 3 December 2022 in premises previously occupied by Debenhams)
- Derry (opened 3 September 2021 in premises previously occupied by Debenhams)
- Dundee (opened 6 June 2025 in premises previously occupied by Debenhams)
- Glasgow (formerly McDonalds Wylie & Lochhead and originally the separate stores of McDonalds and Wylie & Lochhead, acquired 1951 and 1957 respectively; renamed Frasers in 1975)
- Maidstone (formerly House of Fraser; opened 2005; relaunched as Frasers on 17 October 2024 following temporary closure)
- Newbridge (opened 18 October 2022 in premises previously occupied by Debenhams)
- Norwich (formerly House of Fraser; opened 2005)
- Peterborough (opened 13 December 2025 in premises previously occupied by John Lewis & Partners)
- Rushden, Rushden Lakes (formerly House of Fraser; opened 2017)
- Sheffield, Meadowhall (opened 25 September 2024 in premises previously occupied by Debenhams)
- Telford (formerly House of Fraser and originally Beatties; acquired 2005)
- Wolverhampton (opened 12 April 2021 in premises previously occupied by Debenhams; first new Frasers location to be opened by the modern company)

==== Frasers Outlet: 1 location ====
- Luton (opened 10 May 2025 in premises previously occupied by Debenhams) (Note: Despite officially being known as Frasers Outlet, signage uses the House of Fraser brand.)

== Former brands and branches ==
=== Former regional groups ===
House of Fraser previously traded under many different, long established brand names. A number of regional groups of stores were acquired and subsequently extended or amalgamated. The Arnotts, Frasers and Rackhams groups were created by House of Fraser from scratch. These key groups, together with the flagship store of each one, and the regions to which they are largely associated are:

- Army & Navy, Victoria Street, London and south-east England
- Arnotts, mid-market stores in Glasgow and across Scotland
- Beatties, Wolverhampton, stores based in the Midlands.
- Binns, Sunderland, the north and east of England
- Dickins & Jones, Regent Street, London and the home counties
- Dingles, Plymouth and south-west England
- David Evans, Swansea and south Wales
- Frasers, up-market stores in Glasgow, Edinburgh and other principal Scottish cities
- Rackhams, Birmingham, the Midlands and the north of England.

=== Former non department store businesses ===
House of Fraser owned several other retail businesses that were not department stores. In 1941, Fraser's purchased the furniture retailer Muir Simpson of Sauchiehall Street, Glasgow, while J & A Ogilvie Ltd was added in 1966 after the purchase of Wylie and Lochhead. Another business that was gained by purchasing Wylie and Lochhead was funeral directors, which were grown by further purchases. The company also owned clothing manufacturers Nithco Manufacturing, Arthur & Co, and John Kirsop & Son. They also operated clothing stores including:

- Carswell (The Modern Man's Shop)
- Cochranes Stores
- McLaren & Son (closed 1981)
- Forresters
- Kings Fashions
- Logie & Co.
- Maryon Fashion Group (after purchase of J J Allen)
- Chanelle (after purchase of J J Allen)

In the 1980s it created the brand YOU jewellery & cosmetic stores, purchased the shoe retailer Kurt Geiger, tailors Turnbull & Asser, Hawes & Curtis and James Drew, in addition to growing its sports chain Astral Sports which it had purchased in 1978.

=== Former branches ===
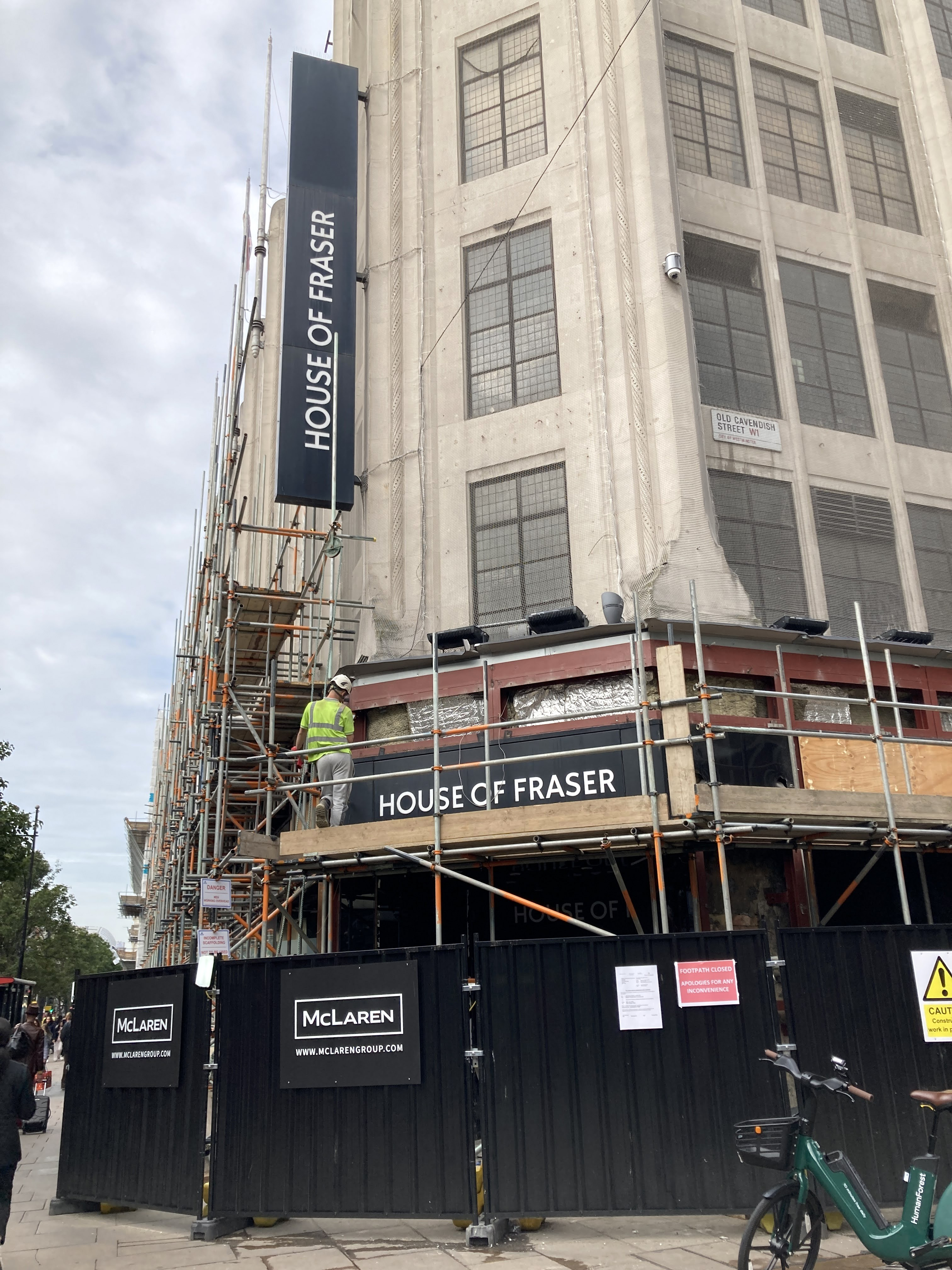
The closed House of Fraser store on Oxford Street in London during October 2022

Over the years, the following branches were closed, sold as going concerns or demerged from the business and no longer trade as part of the company. All outlets were department stores unless otherwise stated.

- Aberdeen, Arnotts (formerly Isaac Benzie; acquired 1955; closed 25 January 1986. The store was at 143-167 George Street)
- Aberdeen, Frasers (formerly Falconers / John Falconer & Co.; acquired 1952; closed 2002. The store was at 57-67 Union Street)
- Aberdeen, House of Fraser.com (website 'Buy & Collect' shop; opened 2011; closed 24 August 2016. The shop was at Unit 1, The Atrium, Union Square)
- Aberdeen, A & R Milne (booksellers and stationers; acquired 1952 as a subsidiary of Watt & Grant. In 1966 the business was amalgamated with Wyllies and the former A & R Milne premises absorbed into the main Watt & Grant store. The shop was at 229 Union Street)
- Aberdeen, J & A Ogilvie (house furnishers; acquired as a subsidiary of Wylie & Lochhead in 1957. The Union Street retail business was renamed Watt & Grant, Home Furnishing Department, in 1972; closed following a fire in 1976. The store was at 367-369 Union Street)
- Aberdeen, Reid & Pearson (acquired 1952; closed 12 May 1973. The store was at 61-65 St Nicholas Street)
- Aberdeen, R J Smith (women's outfitters; acquired 1980, principally to secure the premises at 7-9 Market Street for redevelopment and the expansion of Frasers onto the site; closed 1981)
- Aberdeen, Watt & Grant (acquired 1952; closed 28 November 1981. The store was at 221-229 Union Street)
- Aberdeen, Watt & Grant Bookshop (books and stationery; formerly A & R Milne & Wyllies and originally Wyllies / D Wyllie & Son; acquired 1966; closed 29 March 1986. The shop was originally at 247 Union Street and expanded to occupy 247-251 Union Street following the closure of Watt & Grant Man's Shop in 1981)
- Aberdeen, Watt & Grant Man's Shop (menswear; opened 25 May 1966 in premises previously occupied by W J Milne; closed 28 November 1981 with the premises incorporated into Watt & Grant Bookshop. The shop was at 249-251 Union Street)
- Aberdeen, Watt & Milne (acquired 1955; closed 1966. Following closure the premises were converted to Young World, an outlet of Watt & Grant devoted to children. This business was moved into the main Watt & Grant store in 1968. The store was at 166-172 Union Street)
- Abu Dhabi, World Trade Center Abu Dhabi, House of Fraser (opened October 2013; closed 2016)
- Abu Dhabi, Yas Mall, House of Fraser (opened June 2015; closed 2021)
- Airdrie, Arnotts (formerly Bairds; acquired 1970; renamed Arnotts 2 August 1982. The store was at 18-20 Bank Street and 83-85 Graham Street. The Bank Street building, originally Sutter & Sons, was sold as a going concern to McMaster Stores in 1989, after which the name of the store reverted to Bairds. The Graham Street premises, originally a branch of James B Henderson of Coatbridge, housed all women's accessories departments, better clothing, furs and hairdressing departments until closure in 1984, at which time these departments were incorporated into the Bank Street store)
- Aldershot, Army & Navy (formerly Thomas White; acquired 1973; closed 10 September 1983. The store was at 53-55 High Street)
- Altrincham, Rackhams (opened 1978; closed 31 August 2020. The store was at 2 George Street)
- Arbroath, Arnotts (formerly Soutars / James Soutar & Sons; acquired 1975; closed 1986. The store was at 104-108 High Street)
- Aviemore, Arnotts (opened 1973; closed 1986. The store was in Allander Square, Aviemore Centre)
- Ayr, Arnotts (formerly Hourstons / David Hourston & Sons; acquired 1949; renamed Arnotts 22 January 1973; sold as a going concern to McMaster Stores in 1989, after which the name of the store reverted to Hourstons. The store was at 22-30 Alloway Street)
- Banbridge, Foster Newell (owned jointly with Waterford Glass; opened 1976; closed 1978. The store was at 52 Bridge Street)
- Banff, Arnotts (formerly Benzie & Miller and originally Joseph Rankine; acquired 1958; renamed Arnotts 22 January 1973; sold as a going concern to McMaster Stores in 1989, after which the name of the store reverted to Benzies. The store was at 34 High Street)
- Basildon, Army & Navy (formerly Taylors; acquired 1979; closed 1994. The store was at 3-5 Town Square)
- Bath, Cavendish House (acquired 1969; the business and premises were incorporated into Jolly & Son in 1974. The store was at 7-8 Milsom Street)
- Bath, Jollys / Jolly & Son (acquired 1971; closed 22 February 2025. The store was at 7-14 Milsom Street)
- Belfast, Bank Buildings (Robertson Ledlie Ferguson & Co. trading as Bank Buildings; acquired 1969; closed 1979. The store was at 1-27 Castle Street, Castle Place)
- Belfast, Newells (acquired jointly with Waterford Glass in 1971; closed 23 December 1975. The store was at 41-51 Royal Avenue)
- Belfast, Savills (electrical appliances; acquired 1975; sold as a going concern to Rediffusion in 1978. The store was at 22 High Street)
- Bellshill, Arnotts (formerly Bairds; acquired 1970; sold as a going concern to McMaster Stores in 1989, after which the name of the store reverted to Bairds. The store was at 250-256 Main Street)
- Birkenhead, House of Fraser (formerly Beatties and originally Allansons; acquired 2005; closed 25 March 2020. The store was at 92 Grange Road)
- Birmingham, Beatties (previously the Birmingham branch of C & A; acquired 2005; closed 2006. The store was at 14-28 Corporation Street)
- Birmingham, House of Fraser Outlet (formerly House of Fraser and originally Rackhams; acquired 1959; renamed House of Fraser in 2003 and converted to House of Fraser Outlet in 2023; closed 25 June 2026. The store was at 51-89 Corporation Street)
- Blackpool, Binns (formerly R H O Hills; acquired 1975; closed 1987. The store was at 50-68 Bank Hey Street)
- Bluewater, House of Fraser (opened 1999; closed 27 December 2024)
- Bournemouth, Dingles (formerly J J Allen; acquired 1969; closed 1981. The store was at 68-70 Old Christchurch Road)
- Bournemouth, House of Fraser (formerly Dingles and originally Brights; acquired 1969; closed 2022. The store was at 14-24 Old Christchurch Road)
- Bradford, Rackhams (formerly Brown Muff / Brown, Muff & Co.; acquired 1977; closed 1995. The store was at 24-28 Market Street and 6 Bank Street)
- Bridlington, Binns (formerly Hammonds and originally Carltons; acquired 1972; closed 1995. The store was at 9-21 King Street)
- Brigg, Binns (formerly Lacey & Clark; acquired 1969; closed 1981. The store was at 25 Market Place)
- Bristol, Dingles (formerly Brights, preceded by the Bristol branch of Bobby & Co. and originally John Cordeux & Sons; acquired 1969; renamed Dingles 2 September 1974; closed 15 January 2000. The store was at 46-56 Queen's Road, Clifton)
- Bristol, House of Fraser (opened 2001 in premises previously occupied by Bentalls, preceded by John Lewis and originally Lewis's; closed 2008 on relocation to Cabot Circus. The store was at 1-27 The Horsefair)
- Bristol, Jollys (acquired 1971; closed 1977. The store was at 62-66 Whiteladies Road, Clifton)
- Bristol, Cabot Circus, House of Fraser (opened 25 September 2008; closed 14 August 2024)
- Bromley, Army & Navy (formerly Harrison Gibson; acquired 1973; closed 2004. The store was at 64 High Street and Ringers Road)
- Burton upon Trent, Beatties (acquired 2005, closed 29 September 2012. The store was at Units 23-26, Octagon Shopping Centre)
- Camberley, House of Fraser (formerly Army & Navy and originally Harveys; acquired 1973; closed 7 May 2023. The store was at 47-51 Park Street)
- Cardiff, House of Fraser (formerly Howells / James Howell & Co.; acquired 1972; closed 26 March 2023. The store was at 8-18 St Mary Street)
- Cardiff, Seccombes (acquired 1975; closed 1976. The store was at 79-85 Queen Street)
- Carlisle, House of Fraser (formerly Binns and originally Robinson Brothers; acquired 1953; closed 24 May 2024. The store was at 18-40 English Street)
- Cheltenham, Cavendish House (acquired 1969; closed 11 April 2024. The store was at 32-48 The Promenade)
- Chichester, House of Fraser (formerly Army & Navy and originally J D Morant; acquired 1973; closed 26 January 2019. The store was at 11-18 West Street)
- Cirencester, House of Fraser (formerly Rackhams and originally Frederick Boulton & Sons; acquired 1975; closed 5 January 2019. The store was at 29-35 Market Place)
- Coatbridge, Arnotts (formerly Bairds and originally James B Henderson; acquired 1970; renamed Arnotts 2 August 1982; closed 12 April 1986. The store was at 15-19 Sunnyside Road)
- Copenhagen, A C Illum (acquired 1972; sold as a going concern in 1987. The store was at Østergade 52-54)
- Cork, Cash's / Cash & Co. (acquired jointly with Waterford Glass in 1971, full ownership obtained in 1985; sold as a going concern to Brown Thomas in 1991. The store was at 18-21 St Patrick's Street)
- Cork, Munster Arcade (Robertson Ledlie Ferguson & Co. trading as Munster Arcade; acquired 1969; closed 1979. The store was at 27-30 St Patrick's Street)
- Cumbernauld, Arnotts (opened 1975 in premises previously occupied by a branch of Bows of Glasgow in Cumbernauld Town Centre; closed 1978)
- Cwmbran, House of Fraser (formerly David Evans; acquired 1977, closed 29 June 2022. The store was at 17-20 Gwent Square)
- Darlington, House of Fraser (formerly Binns and originally Arthur Sanders; acquired 1953; closed 8 March 2026. The store was at 1-7 High Row)
- Dingwall, Arnotts (formerly C & J Urquhart; acquired March 1974; renamed Arnotts on 11 April 1975; closed 31 August 1985. The store was at 4 High Street and 1-2 Hill Street)
- Doncaster, Brown Muff (acquired 1977; closed 1978. The store was in West Mall, Arndale Centre)
- Doncaster, House of Fraser Outlet (formerly Binns, preceded by Owen Owen and originally Verity & Sons; acquired 1976; closed 26 April 2024. The store was at 10-14 Baxter Gate)
- Dorchester, Dingles (formerly Army & Navy and originally Genge & Co.; acquired 1973; closed 23 April 1988. The store was at 11-12 High West Street)
- Drumchapel, Arnotts (formerly a satellite store of Muirheads and originally a branch of Alexander Henderson of Glasgow; acquired 1970; closed 1982. The store was in Dunkenny Square, Arndale Centre)
- Dublin, Switzers / Switzer & Co. (acquired jointly with Waterford Glass in 1971, full ownership obtained in 1985; sold as a going concern to Brown Thomas in 1991. The store was at 88-95 Grafton Street)
- Dudley, Beatties (acquired 2005; closed 23 January 2010. The store was at 32 Churchill Precinct)
- Dumfries, Binns (formerly Robinson Brothers and originally William Munro; acquired 1953; closed 1990. The store was at 89-95 High Street)
- Dundee, Arnotts (formerly D M Brown; acquired 1952; renamed Arnotts in 1972; closed 2002. The store was at 74-80 High Street)
- Dundee, Alexander Ewing & Co. (acquired 1941. The store was at 2 Whitehall Street)
- Dundrum, House of Fraser (opened 2005; closed 2020. The store was at Unit 1, Dundrum Town Centre)
- Eastbourne, Army & Navy (formerly Barkers and originally Dale & Kerley; acquired 1957; closed 28 March 1998. The store was at 177-187 Terminus Road)
- East Kilbride, Arnotts (formerly Bairds and originally a branch of Alexander Henderson; acquired 1970; closed 30 July 1988. The store was at 3 Princes Street, Town Centre)
- Edinburgh, Peter Allan (acquired 1940; closed 31 August 1970. The store was at 100-106 South Bridge)
- Edinburgh, 3-29 North Bridge, Arnotts (formerly Patrick Thomson; acquired 1952; renamed Arnotts in 1976; closed 1982)
- Edinburgh, 74-87 South Bridge, Arnotts (formerly J & R Allan; acquired 1952; renamed Arnotts in 1972; closed 1976)
- Edinburgh, J D Blair & Son (acquired 1952; closed 1968. The store was at 1-17 and, after absorbing McIntyres in 1953, 37-41 Nicholson Street, Newington)
- Edinburgh, Blair's Modern Homes Store (formerly McIntyres; acquired 1952 as a subsidiary of J & R Allan; absorbed by J D Blair & Son and renamed Blair's Modern Homes Store in 1953; closed 1968. The store was at 37-41 Nicholson Street, Newington)
- Edinburgh, Darlings / Darling & Co. (acquired 1961; closed 1971 with the business incorporated into Smalls. The store was at 124-125 Princes Street)
- Edinburgh, Frasers (formerly Binns and originally Robert Maule & Son; acquired 1953; renamed Frasers in 1976; closed 10 November 2018. The store was at 144-147 Princes Street)
- Edinburgh, Jenners (acquired 2005; closed 2021. The store was at 47-52 Princes Street)
- Edinburgh, Smalls / William Small & Son (acquired 1946; closed 1977. The store was at 104-106 Princes Street)
- Elgin, Arnotts (formerly Benzie & Miller and originally A L Ramsay & Son; acquired 1958; renamed Arnotts 22 January 1973; closed 1987. The store was at 121-133 High Street)
- Epsom, Army & Navy (formerly Chiesmans and originally Reids / H L Reid & Co.; acquired 1975; closed 1984 on relocation to The Ashley Centre. The store was at 3-5 Ashley Road)
- Epsom, House of Fraser (formerly Dickins & Jones and originally Army & Navy; opened 1984; closed 2022. The store was at Unit 42, The Ashley Centre)
- Evesham, Rackhams (formerly Rightons; acquired 1975; closed 1981. The store was at Manchester House, 1-3 High Street and 3 Bridge Street)
- Exeter, House of Fraser (formerly Dingles and originally Colsons; acquired 1969; closed 2 November 2019. The store was at 30-35 High Street)
- Falkirk, Arnotts (formerly Bairds and originally a branch of Alexander Henderson; acquired 1970; closed 1988. The store was at 43-45 High Street)
- Falmouth, Dingles (formerly Cox & Horder; acquired 1971; closed 3 July 1988. The store was at 47-51 Market Street)
- Fraserburgh, Benzie & Miller (acquired 1958; closed 1968. The store was at 19-29 Mid Street)
- Galway, Moons / Alexander Moon (acquired jointly with Waterford Glass in 1971, full ownership obtained in 1985; sold as a going concern to Brown Thomas in 1991. The store was at 1-29 William Street)
- Gateshead, Metrocentre, House of Fraser (opened 1986; closed September 2021. The store was at Units 26-34, Cameron Walk, Metrocentre)
- Glasgow, 167-201 Argyle Street, Arnotts (formerly Arnott Simpson and originally the separate stores of Arnott & Co. and Robert Simpson & Sons; both businesses acquired 1936 and merged as Arnott Simpson in 1938; closed 26 February 1994)
- Glasgow, 83-97 Sauchiehall Street, Arnotts (formerly Pettigrew & Stephens, relocated to the site in 1971 and renamed Arnotts in 1974; closed 1977 on relocation to Sauchiehall Street Centre. The premises were originally occupied by Alexander Henderson, acquired 1970)
- Glasgow, 200 Sauchiehall Street, Arnotts (formerly Muirheads / Thomas Muirhead & Co.; acquired 1936; renamed Arnotts in 1972; closed 1974)
- Glasgow, Sauchiehall Street Centre, Arnotts (opened 18 October 1977, originally co-located with Dalys, Arnotts occupied Ground Floor and Basement and Dalys occupied First, Second and Third Floors of a five floor department store unit. Arnotts vacated the site in 1979, enabling Dalys to expand into the former Arnotts space. Dalys ceased trading in 1982, after which Arnotts returned to the building, opening as a full-line department store in September 1982; closed 25 January 1986)
- Glasgow, Colosseum (formerly Dallas's Colosseum and originally Walter Wilson & Co. The Grand Colosseum Warehouse; acquired 1942; closed 31 January 1967. The store was at 60-70 Jamaica Street)
- Glasgow, Copland & Lye (premises acquired 1971, the business having already ceased trading; the purchase secured the site for redevelopment. The store was at 165-169 Sauchiehall Street)
- Glasgow, Dallas's (acquired 1942; closed 1973. The store was at 160-186 Cowcaddens Street, Cowcaddens)
- Glasgow, Dalys / Daly & Sons / James Daly & Co. (acquired 1952; closed 1977 on relocation to Sauchiehall Street Centre. The store was at 199-217 Sauchiehall Street)
- Glasgow, Fraser, Sons & Co. (established 1849; closed 1975 with the business incorporated into McDonald's Wylie & Lochhead. The store was at 10-16 Buchanan Street)
- Glasgow, Muir Simpsons (house furnishers; acquired 1941; closed 1961 with the business incorporated into Wylie & Lochhead; following closure the premises were converted into showrooms for the Wylie & Lochhead motors business. The store was at 309-313 Sauchiehall Street)
- Glasgow, Pettigrew & Stephens (acquired 1952; closed 1971 on relocation to 83-97 Sauchiehall Street. The store was at 171-193 Sauchiehall Street)
- Glasgow, Southland (opened 1966 in premises previously occupied by Savette supermarket; closed 28 February 1968. The store was at 62-70 Kilmarnock Road, Shawlands)
- Glasgow, Wood & Selby (acquired 1952; closed 1968. The store was at 227-235 New City Road and, after absorbing Duncans in 1952, 1-33 Great Western Road, St George's Cross)
- Glasgow, Wood & Selby's Modern Homes Store (formerly Duncans; acquired 1952; absorbed by Wood & Selby and renamed Wood & Selby's Modern Homes Store in 1952; closed 1968. The store was at 1-33 Great Western Road, St George's Cross)
- Gravesend, Army & Navy (formerly Chiesmans and originally Bon Marché; acquired 1975; closed 1994. The store was at 1a-1b New Road)
- Greenock, Arnotts (opened 1974; closed 1992. The store was at 39-40 Hamilton Way)
- Greenock, Prentices / D & A Prentice (acquired 1944; closed 1974 to coincide with opening of Arnotts. The store was at 42-44 Hamilton Street)
- Greenock, Shannons / J & S Shannon (acquired 1952; closed 1978. The store was at 29-31 West Blackhall Street)
- Grimsby, House of Fraser (formerly Binns and originally Guy & Smith; acquired 1969; renamed Binns 26 October 1970; closed 2020. The store was at 9-29 Victoria Street)
- Guildford, House of Fraser (formerly Army & Navy and originally Harveys / William Harvey; acquired 1973; closed 30 September 2023. The store was at 105-111 High Street)
- Hamilton, Arnotts (formerly Bairds; acquired 1970; sold as a going concern to McMaster Stores in 1989, after which the name of the store reverted to Bairds. The store was at 1-5 Duke Street)
- Harrogate, Binns (formerly McDonalds and originally Edward J Clarke; acquired 1951; closed 1987. The store was at 10-14 James Street)
- Harrogate, Schofields (previously Cresta House and originally the Harrogate branch of Marshall & Snelgrove; acquired 1988; sold as a going concern to Sara Fashions in 1989, after which the name of the store was changed to Hewletts. The store was at 28-32 James Street)
- Hartlepool, Binns (formerly Gray Peverell; acquired 1953; closed 27 June 1992. The store was at Victoria Road, Hartlepool / West Hartlepool)
- Helston, Dingles (formerly B Thomas; acquired 1971; closed 3 July 1988. The store was at 37-39 Meneage Street)
- High Wycombe, House of Fraser (opened 13 March 2008; closed 12 January 2023. The store was at Unit 1, Newlands Meadow, Eden Shopping Centre)
- Hove, Army & Navy (formerly Chiesmans, preceded by Stuart Norris and originally Driscolls; acquired 1975; closed 1990. The store was at 141-155 Church Road)
- Huddersfield, House of Fraser (formerly Beatties; acquired 2005, closed 29 August 2022. The store was at Unit 1, Kingsgate Centre)
- Hull, House of Fraser (formerly Hammonds; acquired 1972; closed 4 August 2019. The store was at 1 Paragon Square)
- Ilford, Army & Navy (formerly Chiesmans and originally C W Burnes; acquired 1975; closed 1984. The store was at 104-108 Cranbrook Road)
- Inverness, Arnotts (formerly Benzie & Miller and originally Young & Chapman; acquired 1958; renamed Arnotts 22 January 1973; closed 2003. The store was at 7-17 Union Street)
- Irvine, Arnotts (opened 2 October 1975; sold as a going concern to McMaster Stores in 1989, after which the name of the store was changed to Hourstons. The store was at 46 Rivergate)
- Kensington, Barkers / John Barker & Co. (acquired 1957; closed 2 January 2006. The store was at 63-97 Kensington High Street)
- Kensington, Derry & Toms (acquired 1957; closed 1973 with the business incorporated into Barkers. The store was at 99-121 Kensington High Street)
- Kensington, Pontings / Ponting Brothers (acquired 1957; closed 1970 with the business incorporated into Barkers. The store was at 123-127 Kensington High Street)
- Kilmarnock, Frasers (formerly Hugh Lauder & Co.; acquired 1972; closed 1987. The store was at 45-55 King Street)
- Kingston upon Thames, Army & Navy (formerly Chiesmans, preceded by Hide & Co. and originally Shrubsoles; acquired 1975; closed 1987. The store was at 7-9 Market Place)
- Kingston upon Thames, Barkers (home furnishings; opened 1959 in premises previously occupied by Zeeta; closed 1967. The store was at 37 Thames Street)
- Kirkcaldy, Arnotts (formerly Barnet & Morton; acquired October 1975; renamed Arnotts 2 February 1976; closed 1988. The store was at 192-196 High Street)
- Knightsbridge, Harrods (acquired 1959; demerged from House of Fraser in 1994. The store was at 87-135 Brompton Road)
- Leamington Spa, House of Fraser (formerly Rackhams, preceded by Army & Navy and originally Burgis & Colbourne; acquired 1973; renamed Rackhams in 1975; closed January 2022. The store was at 76-86 The Parade)
- Leeds, House of Fraser (formerly Rackhams, preceded by the temporary store of Schofields and originally the Leeds branch of Woolworths; acquired 1988; closed 2023. The store was at 140-142 Briggate)
- Leeds, Schofields (opened in the Schofields Centre in 1990; closed 1996)
- Leicester, House of Fraser Outlet (formerly Rackhams; opened 29 February 1992; renamed House of Fraser Outlet in 2008; closed 17 July 2017. The store was at Unit 76, Highcross Leicester / The Shires)
- Leicester, Rackhams (formerly Morgan Squire; acquired 1969; renamed Rackhams in 1975; closed 31 October 1987. The store was at 15-23 Hotel Street and 26 Market Street)
- Lewisham, Army & Navy (formerly Chiesmans; acquired 1975; renamed Army & Navy in 1982; closed 1994. The store was at 33-45 & 47-63 Lewisham High Street)
- Limerick, Todds / William Todd & Co. (acquired jointly with Waterford Glass in 1971, full ownership obtained in 1985; sold as a going concern to Brown Thomas in 1991. The store was at 12-16 O'Connell Street)
- Lincoln, House of Fraser (formerly Binns and originally Mawer & Collingham; acquired 1980; closed 23 May 2025. The store was at 226-231 High Street)
- Liverpool, Binns (formerly Hendersons / William Henderson & Sons; acquired 1959; renamed Binns in 1976; closed 1983. The store was at 9-15 Church Street)
- Liverpool, House of Fraser.com (website 'Buy & Collect' shop; opened 2011; closed 24 August 2016. The shop was at Unit 10, 2-4 Peter's Arcade, Liverpool One)
- London, King William Street, House of Fraser (opened 2003; closed 29 December 2018. The store was at 68 King William Street)
- London, Oxford Street, House of Fraser (formerly D H Evans; acquired 1959; closed 22 January 2022. The store was at 308-322 Oxford Street)
- London, Regent Street, Dickins & Jones (acquired 1959; closed 14 January 2006. The store was at 224-244 Regent Street)
- London, Victoria Street, House of Fraser (formerly Army & Navy / Army & Navy Stores; acquired 1973, closed 2 July 2022. The store was at 97-105 Victoria Street)
- Maidstone, Army & Navy (formerly T C Dunning & Son; acquired 1975; renamed Army & Navy in 1976; closed 2005. The store was at 69-77 Week Street)
- Maidstone, Chiesmans (formerly Denniss Paine & Co.; acquired 1975; closed 1984. The store was at 23-27 High Street)
- Manchester, Kendals / Kendal Milne (furniture building at 83-93 Deansgate closed 1981)
- Middlesbrough, Frasers (opened 2021 in premises previously occupied by Psyche and originally Uptons; closed September 2024. The store was at 175-187 Linthorpe Road)
- Middlesbrough, House of Fraser (formerly Binns and originally Thomas Jones; acquired 1953; closed 19 June 2022. The store was at 37 Linthorpe Road)
- Milton Keynes, House of Fraser (formerly Dickins & Jones; opened 25 September 1981; closed 1 February 2020. The store was at 28 Acorn Walk, Central Milton Keynes)
- Motherwell, Arnotts (formerly Bairds; acquired 1970; closed 25 January 1986. The store was at 52-60 Merry Street)
- Nanjing, Xinjiekou, House of Fraser (opened 21 December 2016; closed 2018)
- Newcastle upon Tyne, 19-27 Market Street, Binns (formerly Coxon / James Coxon & Co.; acquired 1953; closed 26 March 1977 on relocation to 29-39 Market Street)
- Newcastle upon Tyne, 29-39 Market Street, Binns (opened 31 March 1977 in premises previously occupied by Bainbridge; closed 28 January 1995)
- Newport, Isle of Wight, Army & Navy (formerly Chiesmans and originally Morris / Edward Morris; acquired 1975; closed 1987. The store was at 34-39 High Street)
- Newquay, Dingles (formerly Hawke & Thomas; acquired 1971; closed 1983. The store was at 29-31 Bank Street)
- Newry, Foster Newell (acquired jointly with Waterford Glass in 1971; destroyed by incendiary bombing on 24 April 1976 and relocated to Banbridge. The store was at 43-53 Hill Street)
- Newton Abbot, Dingles (formerly William Badcock & Sons; acquired 1971; renamed Dingles 26 March 1973; closed 1988. The store was at 34-38 Courtenay Street)
- Newton Abbot, J F Rockhey (formerly John Mackenzie; acquired 1959; closed 24 March 1973 with the business incorporated into William Badcock & Sons. The store was at 34-42 Queen Street)
- Newton Abbot, Henry Warren & Son (men's and boys' outfitters; acquired 1971; closed 1974 with the business incorporated into Dingles. After closure the premises were converted into a branch of Southwest Rentals, closing in 1977. The shop was at 8 Bank Street)
- Northampton, House of Fraser (formerly Beatties; acquired 2005; closed 2014. The store was at Unit 32, Newland Walk, Grosvenor Centre)
- Nottingham, House of Fraser (opened 17 September 1997; closed 9 October 2025. The store was at 2 Union Road, Victoria Centre)
- Oswestry, Rackhams (formerly Bradleys; acquired 1975; closed 1984. The store was at 5-13 Cross Street)
- Paisley, Arnotts (formerly Robert Cochran & Son; acquired 1964; renamed Arnotts 22 January 1973; closed 2003. The store was at 11-15 Gauze Street)
- Paisley, Fraser & Love (17-21 Gauze Street)
- Penzance, Dingles (formerly John Polglase; acquired 1971; closed 3 July 1988. The store was at 37 Market Place)
- Perth, Frasers (opened 1984 on the site of Wallaces / D A Wallace & Co., acquired 1946; closed 2002. The store was at 116-128 High Street.)
- Perth, Gordon & Stanfield (acquired 1941. The store was at 32 South Methven Street)
- Peterhead, Arnotts (formerly Benzie & Miller and originally Simpson & Barclay; acquired 1958; renamed Arnotts in 1972; destroyed by fire on 21 October 1977 and not reopened. The store was at 2-8 Marischal Street)
- Plymouth, House of Fraser (formerly Dingles / E Dingle & Co.; acquired 1971; closed 24 March 2026. The store was at 40-46 Royal Parade)
- Port Glasgow, Bairds (formerly a branch of Gilchrists of Greenock; acquired 1970; closed 1977. The store was at 40-42 Princes Street)
- Port Talbot, David Evans (formerly W J Williams & Son; acquired 1977. The store was at 7-11 High Street)
- Portsmouth, John Anstiss (acquired 1975)
- Reading, House of Fraser (opened in The Oracle shopping centre in 1999; closed 28 September 2023)
- Richmond, House of Fraser (formerly Dickins & Jones; opened September 1969 on the site of Gosling & Sons, acquired 1957; closed September 2020. The store was at 75-81 George Street)
- Richmond, Wright Brothers (acquired 1975; sold as a going concern to Owen Owen in 1976 in exchange for Owen Owen's Doncaster store. The store was at 29-34 George Street)
- Salisbury, Clark & Lonnen (acquired 1975. The store was at 33 Butcher Row and 44-54 New Canal)
- Salisbury, Dingles (formerly Blooms; acquired 1975; closed 1988. The store was at 3-9 New Canal)
- Scunthorpe, Binns (opened 19 September 1974; closed 1997. The store was at 28-32 Southgate)
- Sheffield, House of Fraser (formerly Rackhams and originally Walshs / John Walsh; acquired 1959; closed 1997. The store was at 50 High Street)
- Sheffield, Meadowhall, House of Fraser (opened 4 September 1990; closed 3 January 2021. The store was at Unit 1, Park Lane, Meadowhall)
- Shotts, Arnotts (formerly Bairds; acquired 1970; closed 1986. The store was at 162-164 Station Road)
- Shrewsbury, Grocott & Co. (acquired 1975. The store was at 1-3 The Square)
- Shrewsbury, House of Fraser (formerly Rackhams and originally Joseph Della Porta; acquired 1975; closed 12 January 2019. The store was at 36-38 High Street)
- Skipton, Ledgard & Wynn (acquired 1988; sold as a going concern in 1989. The store was at 53 High Street)
- Skipton, Rackhams (formerly Brown Muff and originally Amblers; acquired 1977; closed 6 December 2019. The store was at 31-41 High Street)
- Slagelse, A C Illum (acquired 1972; closed 1979)
- Solihull, House of Fraser (formerly Beatties; acquired 2005; closed 28 August 2023. The store was at 700 Warwick Road)
- Southend-on-Sea, Army & Navy (formerly Chiesmans, preceded by the Southend branch of J R Roberts Stores; acquired 1975; closed 1984. The store was at 90 High Street)
- Southport, Binns (formerly Alexanders; acquired 1975; closed 1981. The store was at 377-389 Lord Street)
- South Shields, Binns (formerly Fowler & Brock; acquired 1953; closed 1995. The store was at 49-61 King Street)
- Stirling, Arnotts (formerly Logies / Logie & Co.; acquired 1945; renamed Arnotts in 1974; closed 1977. The store was at 61-67 Barnton Street)
- Stirling, Frasers (formerly McLachlan & Brown; acquired 1946; renamed Frasers in 1977; sold as a going concern to McMaster Stores in 1989, after which the name of the store reverted to McLachlan & Brown. The store was at 8-14 Murray Place)
- Sunderland, Binns / H Binns, Son & Co. (acquired 1953; closed 1993. The store was at 29-32 & 33-42 Fawcett Street)
- Swansea, David Evans (acquired 1977; closed 2005. The store was at 26-36 Princess Way)
- Swindon, House of Fraser Outlet (formerly House of Fraser; opened 1996; closed November 2021. The store was at 44-54 Canal Walk, Brunel Centre)
- Torquay, Dingles (formerly J F Rockhey; acquired 1959; closed 30 July 1988. The store was at 49-53 Fleet Street and 40-42 Swan Street)
- Trowbridge, Dingles (formerly Fear Hill; acquired 1969; renamed Dingles in 1974; closed 1988. The store was at 2-3 Silver Street)
- Truro, Dingles (formerly Criddle & Smith; acquired 1971; closed 3 October 1987. The store was at 15-16 King Street)
- Tunbridge Wells, Army & Navy (formerly Chiesmans and originally Waymarks; acquired 1975; renamed Army & Navy in 1983; closed 1988. The store was at 2-14 Calverley Road)
- Upton Park, Chiesmans (formerly John Lewis; acquired 1975. The store was at 346-352 Green Street)
- Waterford, Robertson Ledlie Ferguson & Co. (acquired 1969. The store was at 53 The Quay)
- West Thurrock, Lakeside, House of Fraser (opened 9 September 1991; closed January 2024. The store was at Unit 200, Lakeside Shopping Centre)
- Whifflet, Arnotts (formerly Bairds and originally a branch of James B Henderson; acquired 1970; renamed Arnotts 2 August 1982; closed 1984. The store was at 13-15 Easton Place)
- White City, Westfield London, House of Fraser (opened 2008; closed December 2022. The store was in The Village, Westfield Shopping Centre)
- Winchester, Army & Navy (formerly Chiesmans and originally D C Edmonds & Sons; acquired 1975; closed 7 April 1984. The store was at 106-107 High Street)
- Wishaw, Arnotts (formerly Bairds / T Baird & Sons; acquired 1970; renamed Arnotts in 1982; closed June 1989. The store was at 86-94 Main Street)
- Wolverhampton, Beatties / James Beattie (acquired 2005; closed 2020. The store was at 71-78 Victoria Street)
- Wolverhampton, Rackhams (formerly Army & Navy and originally Thomas Clarkson & Sons; acquired 1973; renamed Rackhams in 1975; closed 1992. The store was at 42-50 Snow Hill)
- Wood Green, Bartons / A Barton & Co. (acquired 1975. The store was at 26-36 High Road)
- Wood Green, D H Evans (opened 1980; closed 1996. The store was at 171-175 High Road, Wood Green Shopping City)
- Worcester, House of Fraser (formerly Beatties; acquired 2005; closed 3 September 2025. The store was at 24 Chapel Walk / Crowngate Shopping Centre)
- Xuzhou, House of Fraser (opened 2017; closed 2017)
- Yeovil, Dingles (formerly Gamis's; acquired 1975; closed 1987. The store was at 3 & 6 High Street and occupied the upper floors of 4-5 High Street, connecting the two premises)
