= Benzie & Miller =

Former department store chain in Scotland

Benzie & Miller was a small department store chain based in Scotland and became part of House of Fraser in 1958.

== Early history ==
Benzie & Miller was set up as a department store in 1920 by an amalgamation of business' in Fraserburgh, Scotland.

In 1886 a 21-year-old William Benzie took over the management of a drapery business in Mid Street, Fraserburgh called The Colosseum. Within a year he had set up shop in Buckie with his own store, but was asked to take over the business in Fraserburgh from Mitchell & Co, and sold the Buckie business shortly afterwards. In 1896 William built a new shop on the opposite side of the street as the business was expanding, and in 1898 a powerplant was installed to provide the store with electric light – a first for Fraserburgh. The store continued to grow with several extensions being added to the rear of the building.

James Miller was an apprentice cabinetmaker whom knew William Benzie. It was at William Benzie's recommendation that he joined a local cabinetmaking business, which he eventually took over after the death of the business owner. The business continued until the First World War when Miller sold the business as he was uncertain of his future. On returning from the war Miller rebuilt his business from scratch.

== The Department Store ==
In 1920 William Benzie had planned to incorporate his business to expand it into a full line department store. After discussions with his friend, James Miller, Benzie & Miller Ltd was formed, which included taking over the Fraserburgh branch of Lerwick shoemakers, Messrs. Goodlad and Coutts, with its manager Mr Robert Henderson joining the new board. The new store was expanded by buying up adjacent properties and building a new store which had a 120-foot frontage, with a large workshop added for the cabinetmaking business. The new store sold Household Ironmongery, Hardware, China and Glassware as well as the Drapery, Shoes and Cabinetmaking business and incorporated a small tea room on the first floor.

In 1924 Mr. Alexander Benzie, William's son, joined the firm as a director in charge of the menswear department with John B Miller, James Miller's son, joining in 1931. Later that year, however, William Benzie died. His death was followed by that of James Miller in 1934. In the same year the store was extended again with a three-storey building that increased its size by 11,500 square foot.

The business expanded with further stores being opened in Inverness (formerly Young & Chapman); Banff (formerly Rankin & Co); Peterhead and Elgin (formerly A L Ramsay & Son). During the Second World War the Fraserburgh store was destroyed by a fire and took until the 1950s to be completely rebuilt.

The business continued to be run independently, when in 1958 the current owner Baile Alexander Benzie agreed to sell the business to Hugh Fraser, the chairman of House of Fraser. Benzie left Fraserburgh and moved to Exmouth where he took over ownership of the Thomas Tucker department store until his death in 1991.

The business in Scotland continued under the Benzie & Miller name, however this was not to last. In 1968 the Fraserburgh store was closed (the building was demolished in 1985) and in 1977 the Peterhead store was destroyed by fire, never to be rebuilt. As part of the House of Fraser restructuring in the 1970s the remaining stores were absorbed into the Arnotts division and rebranded under this name. They have all since closed, with the last store of the Benzie & Miller empire shutting in Inverness in 2003.
