= D H Evans =

Former department store in London

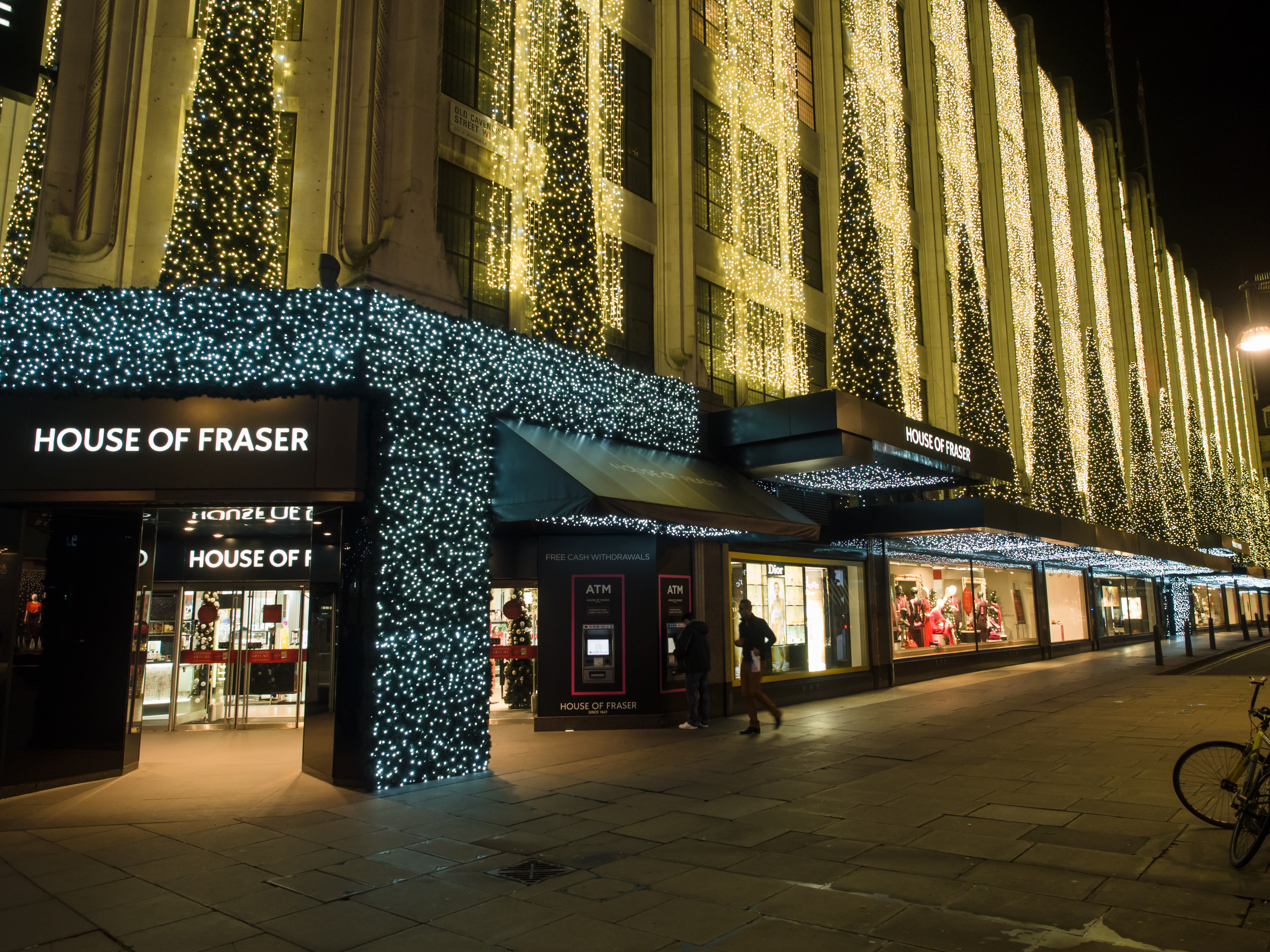
- The D H Evans store in 2013, then known as House of Fraser

- Location within Greater London

General information
- Location: London, 320 Oxford Street
- Coordinates: 51°30′55.07″N 0°8′46.91″W
- Completed: 1893

D H Evans was a department store located in Oxford Street, London, England, which later became part of House of Fraser. The store was rebranded as House of Fraser in 2001.

== History ==
D H Evans was opened in 1879 by Dan Harries Evans at 320 Oxford Street. Evans was a Welshman who had trained as draper and had moved to London in 1878. This store quickly grew and by 1885 he had taken on three of the adjoining stores.

In 1893, the store moved into further new premises at 290-294 Oxford Street and became a limited liability company. The new company was listed as having capital of £202,000. The store was grown again with the purchase of 296-306 Oxford Street in 1895 and 308 in 1898. In 1897, Dan Evans resigned as Managing Director but stayed on the board, and was replaced by Harrods manager Ernest Webb on the advice of Harrods and D H Evans director Richard Burbridge.

The business continued to expand by purchasing the business of neighbors James Goodman and Arthur Saunders, and in 1906, announced the rebuilding of the collection of buildings on the west side of Old Cavendish Street. In 1915, Dan Evans retired from the board and was replaced by Ernest Webb's son William Wallace Webb.

By 1928, however, DH Evans realized they could not expand without further investment, and due to the relationship with Harrods agreed a merger with Harrods being the senior partner, with William Burbridge becoming the chairman. Burbridge realized that the business could not continue to operate from two buildings, and so, in 1935, land bounded by Oxford Street, Old Cavendish Street, Henrietta Street and Chapel Place was acquired and demolished for a new store. The architect chosen was Louis Blanc and the new store fully opened in 1937 after being built in two phases. The former East block of the store was sold to John Spedan Lewis, of the John Lewis Partnership for £848,500.

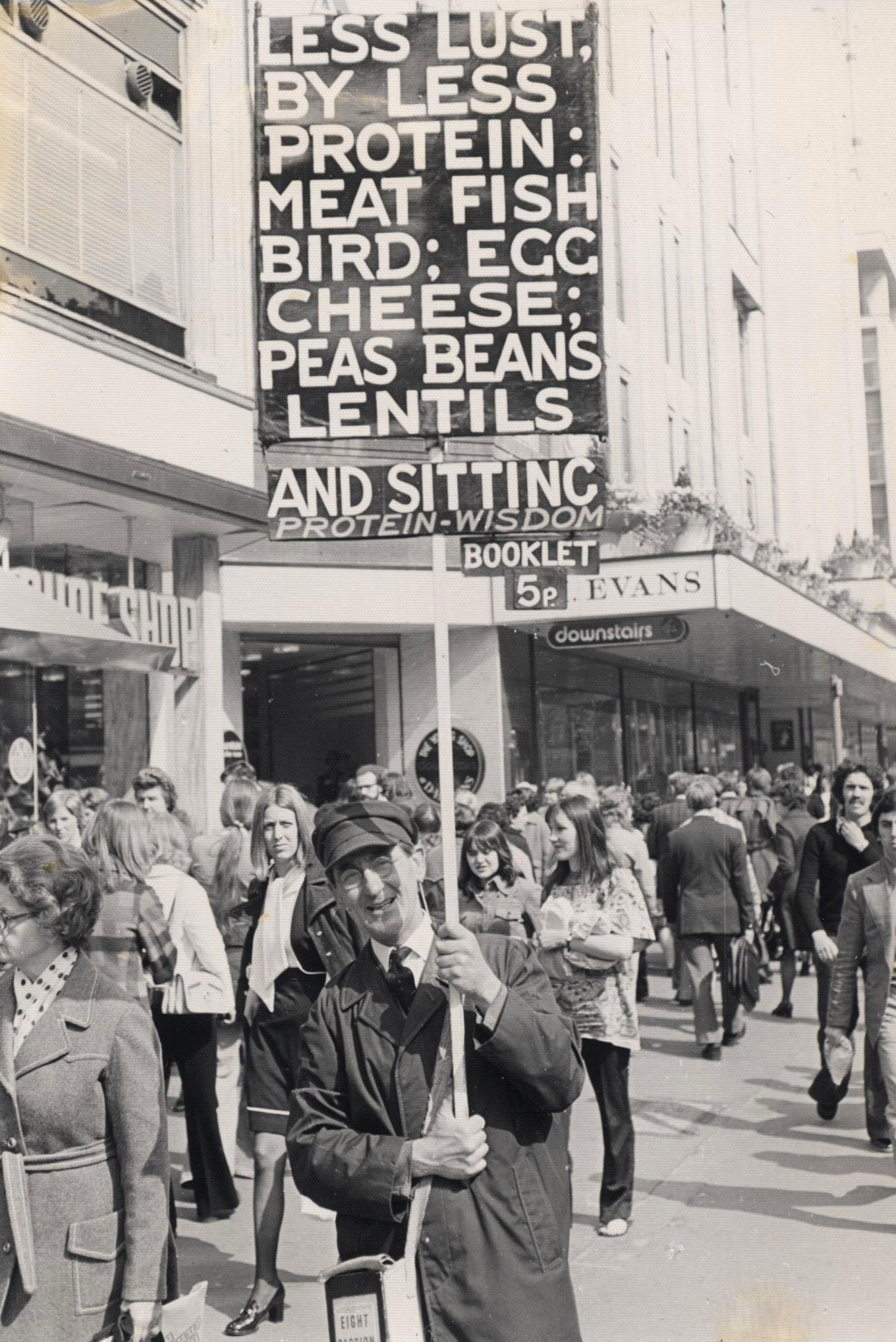
Campaigner Stanley Green outside D H Evans in 1974

After the war, D H Evans purchased the Devon business of J F Rockhey, and D H Evans was run as a wholly owned subsidiary of Harrods. In 1954, Harrods was purchased by House of Fraser, and D H Evans become a trading arm within the Harrods group. A second D H Evans store was added in Wood Green, London in 1980, and the Oxford Street store was refurbished twice between 1982 and 1985.

In 2001, the store was rebranded under the House of Fraser name. The store closed permanently in January 2022.
