= Bonzi =

Bonzi or Bonzie may refer to:

- Bonzi, alternative spelling of Bonsi della Ruota
- Bonzie Colson (born 1996), American basketball player
- Bonzi Wells (born 1976), American basketball player
- Benjamin Bonzi (born 1996), French tennis player
- Fausto Bonzi (born 1961), Italian former mountain runner
- Piero de Bonzi (1631–1703), Italian-French Roman Catholic cardinal
- Pietro Paolo Bonzi (c. 1576–1636), Italian painter
- Bonzie (musician), American singer and songwriter Nina Ferraro (born 1995)
- Bonzi Records, American record label created by J. Wells
- Bonzie (Ninjago), character from Ninjago

== See also ==
- BonziBuddy, discontinued freeware virtual desktop assistant
- Palazzo Bonzi, building in Crema, Italy
