= Cavendish House =

Department store in Gloucestershire, England

Coordinates: 51.900°N 2.076°W

- Type: Privately held
- Industry: Retail
- Founded: 1823
- Defunct: April 11, 2024
- Area served: England

Cavendish House, Cheltenham

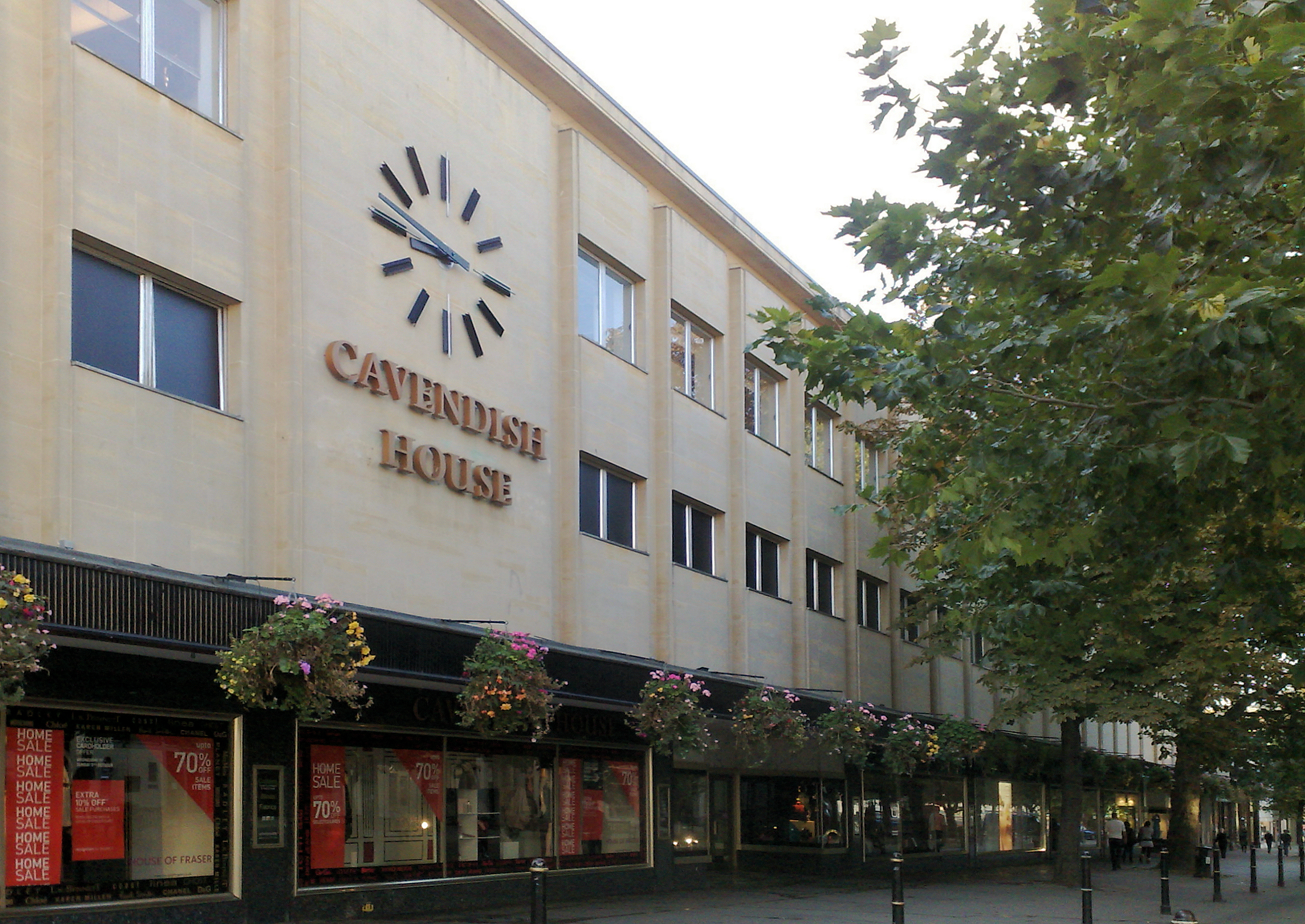
Promenade frontage

Cavendish House was Cheltenham's oldest department store (established in 1823), located on The Promenade. Its establishment was of great significance for Cheltenham's future reputation as a leading shopping centre. Known as 'Cavendish House' from its early days, its name was officially adopted with the registration of a limited liability company in 1883. The store became part of the House of Fraser group in 1970. The store closed in April 2024, after 201 years.

== Early history ==
In December 1813, Thomas Clark, who was the owner of a small drapery shop at 44 Wigmore Street, close to Cavendish Square, London, England, assumed William Debenham as an equal partner, and thereafter the firm traded as Clark & Debenham. The shop was later renamed Cavendish House and carried drapery, silks, haberdashery, millinery, hosiery, lace and family mourning goods. As the trade grew, the partners determined to expand the business by opening provincial branches in Cheltenham, Gloucestershire, England, and Harrogate, Yorkshire, England.

By 1823, Clark & Debenham had opened a small drapery business at 3 Promenade Rooms, Cheltenham, selling a selection of silks, muslins, shawls, gloves, lace and fancy goods. The new shop flourished. In 1837, Clark retired from the business and Debenham assumed two of his most trusted staff, William Pooley and John Smith, as partners, trading in both London and Cheltenham as Debenham, Pooley & Smith. By 1840, the management of the Cheltenham branch appears to have been given to Clement Freebody, Debenham's brother-in-law. Around 1843, another branch shop was launched in Harrogate.

Extended and refurbished premises opened in Cheltenham in October 1844. Pooley and Smith retired from the business in 1851 when Debenham took his son, William, and Clement Freebody into partnership, trading as Debenham, Son & Freebody . By 1872, the store occupied a very large site, stretching from the Promenade to Regent Street, with showrooms offering more than twenty departments and extensive workrooms to the rear. At this time all three shops in London, Cheltenham and Harrogate were trading in similar goods and issued a joint catalogue, called the Fashion Book, that was the basis of an extensive mail-order trade. In 1876 when Freebody retired, a new partnership, Debenham & Hewitt, was formed. George Hewitt appears to have worked at the Cheltenham store as a draper's assistant during the early 1860s but details of his subsequent career are not known. By 1883, George Hewitt was the sole owner of the Cheltenham business, Frank and William Debenham having withdrawn to manage the London store as a separate concern.

== Post Debenhams history ==
In July 1883, Cavendish House Ltd was registered as a limited liability company to acquire the Cheltenham business with a capital of £35,000. George Hewitt, chairman of the new company, took most of the shares and the remainder were largely split between John Cooper, an accountant and secretary of the company, Charles Williams, manager of the general departments, and Albert Chapman Nicholls, manager of the furnishing section (and father of singer Agnes Nicholls). In 1888, upon Hewitt's retirement, the first company was liquidated and reconstructed as Cavendish House Ltd, a public company with a capital of £85,000. J C Griffith became chairman and John Cooper, Charles Williams and Albert Nichols initially remained managing directors. Both Hewitt and Debenham had modest shareholdings which were gradually sold off over the following years.

By 1890, the store had a floor space of 20,000 square feet. The capital provided by the public flotation of the business allowed the implementation of an extensive refurbishment programme. In 1891, a new frontage of plate glass, with a frieze of richly coloured leaded windows, was erected, and, in 1898, electric lighting was installed throughout the store. In 1903, Brunswick House, a silk mercery business established in 1851 by William Thomson Smith at 3 Promenade Villas, Cheltenham was purchased on favourable terms. The acquisition was financed by the issue, in November 1903, of £20,000 of debentures. During 1904, the company also purchased 56 Regent Street, London, which was used for the bedding department. In 1920, a gentlemen's outfitter and music shop were acquired with capital raised by the issue of a further £30,000 of debentures, and, in 1928, a site in Regent's Mews, formerly a livery stable, was acquired and opened as showrooms.

In July 1928, the company was taken over by Standard Industrial Trust, Broad Street Place, London, which also owned Morgan Squire Ltd, department store, Leicester, England. In 1931, the Cheltenham premises were entirely refurbished, creating a large store of over 163,000 square feet, with the current 287-foot frontage on the Promenade. (Obvious typo for 1837, see above, In 1951, Cavendish House bought Cheltenham drapers Ayris Ltd, also based on the Promenade. In 1957, the company opened a branch store in Oxford Street, London, but it proved impossible to manage effectively from a distance and the venture was closed within three months. In 1961, a controlling interest in both Cavendish House Co Ltd and Morgan Squire Ltd was acquired by Swears & Wells Ltd (1926), a London-based company specialising in the development and sale of retail space. The following year, the Cavendish House Co Ltd shares again changed hands passing to JJ Allen Ltd, department store group based in Bournemouth, England. In 1970, J J Allen Ltd was acquired by House of Fraser plc. At some time, Cavendish House had opened a store in Bath, which in 1975 was transferred to another House of Fraser group business Jolly & Son.

In June 2024, Cavendish House partially reopened. The -1 floor, Ground Floor and 1st Floor reopened, to pop-up market stalls.

== Closure ==
In January 2024 the closure of the store was announced. The store closed on 11 April 2024.
