= Brown Muff =

Former department store chain

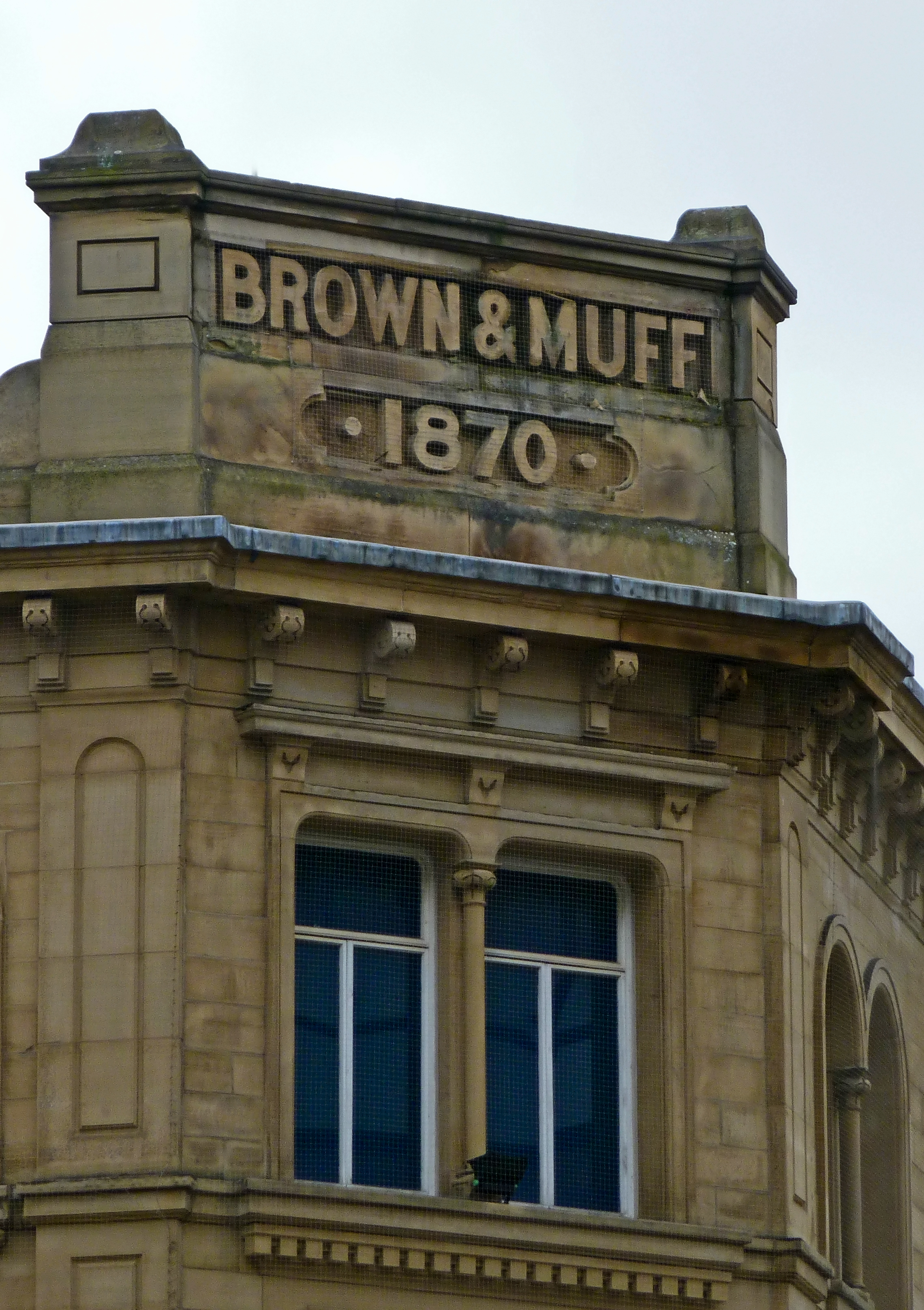
Brown & Muff 1870

Brown Muff & Co, was a small chain of department stores based in Yorkshire, England, with its flagship store located in Bradford. It was purchased by House of Fraser in 1977.

== History ==
Brown Muff & Co were started in 1814 by Elizabeth Brown at 11 Market Street, Bradford as a drapery. By 1822 the shop had branched out to be both a public library and a book shop.

The business grew and in 1828 Elizabeth's son Henry joined the firm, which was renamed Brown & Son. Elizabeth retired in 1834, and Henry ran the store until 1846 when he went into partnership with his brother-in-law, Thomas Muff, to form Brown Muff & Co.

In 1846 the railway arrived in Bradford, and Brown Muff & Co expanded with the new custom. In 1856, they were listed in the Trade Directory as drapers, hosiers, tailors and hatters, with several neighbouring stores being purchased to expand the business. The store was known for its luxurious goods.

The store was demolished and rebuilt in 1870, as part of street improvement plans, with the new building being designed by architects Knowles & Wilcock. This building still stands today.

In 1905, Brown Muff & Co were incorporated as a private limited company, with Henry, Charles and Frederic Muff and George and Richard Walker as shareholders. The business continued to expand with new departments including a Beauty Parlour opening in 1927. However during the 1930s Great Depression the store struggled and moved away from the luxury market to a populist approach.

In 1950, a new electrical department was opened at 55 Market Street, while in 1956 they restructured Howard House and the main store, and in 1958 opened a food department selling delicacies from around the world.

By 1960, the business had its best ever profits and started a store expansion programme. They first opened a new store in Skipton in 1961 (formerly Amblers Department Store), followed by Bingley in 1963 (formerly Pratts Department Store), before opening a store in Doncaster in 1975. However in 1975, House of Fraser bought a 27.2% shareholding in the company.

The business was suffering during the financial difficulties of the 1970s, and the share holders were advised to sell to House of Fraser. In 1977, the deal was completed and the business of Brown Muff & Co was transferred into the Rackhams division of House of Fraser, with all stores being re-branded Rackhams in 1978. The Bradford store continued to operate within the House of Fraser business until 1995 when the store was closed, while Bingley & Doncaster were also closed. The last store in the Brown Muff empire to still be open as a House of Fraser store was in Skipton which closed in December 2019.
