= David Evans (department store) =

Former department store group in Wales

David Evans was a small department store group based in South Wales with its flagship store located in Swansea.

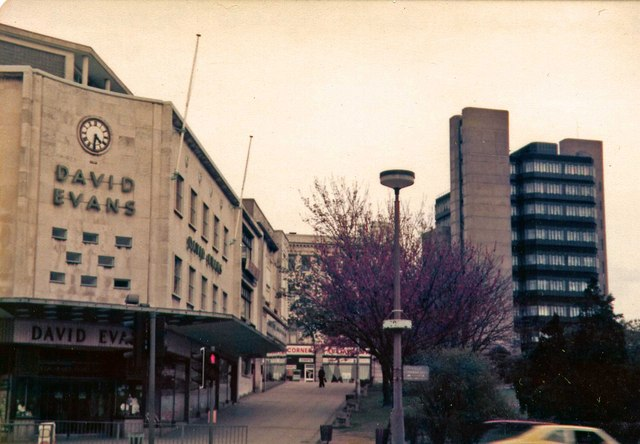
David Evans Department Store, Swansea. May 1979

== Establishment ==
David Evans & Co was formed in 1900 by a partnership involving a local draper David Evans, Soloman Andrews – a prominent Cardiff businessman who owned property in Swansea and his son Francis Emile Andrews. The business opened on the site of the old Theatre Royal, in a building owned and built by one of Soloman Andrews' companies and leased to the new business.

== Growth ==
By 1907 the company had purchased the freehold from Soloman Andrews and between 1908 and 1909 extended the store. However the advent of the First World War had seen difficult trading, and David Evans left the business selling his shares to the Andrews family. The business however fared worse during the Second World War, when the building was destroyed by German bombs and the business operated out of rented property until a new building was erected on the site of the former store in 1954.

The company however grew after the Second World War, by first buying the old Capitol cinema in Port Talbot and turning it into a furniture store in 1948, before buying Port Talbot business W J Williams in 1951 and 10 years later opening a brand new store in the town of Cwmbran. In 1958, the Swansea store was expanded and by 1959 included a newly installed Food Hall.

== Takeover ==
In 1977 the business was purchased from the Andrews family by House of Fraser.

== Closure ==
The Swansea store was closed in 2005 and demolished in 2007, while the Cwmbran store is now home to House of Fraser, which has since also closed in June 2022.
