= Benzi =

Benzi is a surname. Notable people with the surname include:

- Erick Benzi (born 1959), French music composer
- Massimiliano Soldani Benzi (1656–1740), Italian sculptor
- Oreste Benzi (1925–2007), Italian Roman Catholic priest
- Roberto Benzi (born 1937), French music conductor
- A nickname for Karim Benzema

== See also ==
- Benza
