= John Walsh (department store) =

Former department store in Sheffield, South Yorkshire, England

John Walsh was a family-owned department store in Sheffield, South Yorkshire, England.

== History ==
On the morning of 19 June 1875, John Walsh opened a small baby linen and ladies' outfitting shop, at number 39 High Street, Sheffield. By 1888 the business had grown and had purchased shop units on both on the north and south sides of the High Street. In 1902 John Walsh retired from the business and the store was incorporated as John Walsh Ltd. with five directors coming from the Walsh family.

The business had grown into a department store offering the sale of silks, dresses, millinery, ribbons, laces, flowers, feathers, toys, stationery, patent medicine and other goods as well as maintaining restaurant and writing rooms, and by 1906 had opened its own cabinet making factory in Pinfold Street.

During the Second World War the store was destroyed by the Sheffield Blitz in 1940 and the business re-opened in former staff accommodation at The Mount and Fargate. To secure the company's furniture business, the factory in Pinfold Street was made into a separate business, John Walsh Manufacturing Co Ltd in 1944, which continued to trade until its closure in 1957.

The business was acquired by Harrods in 1946, who had the funds to rebuild the destroyed store. The new store opened to great acclaim in 1953. The Harrods group was taken over by House of Fraser in 1959 and the store later renamed, firstly as Rackhams Sheffield from 1972 and then House of Fraser Sheffield from 1987. The store was closed in 1998.

The former Walsh's building was then occupied by T. J. Hughes. T. J. Hughes then went into administration in August 2011, and although this store survived, the landlord of the building terminated T. J. Hughes' lease on the 6-floor former department store. The street-level part of the building has since been split three ways into branches of Poundland, British Heart Foundation Electrical and Furnishings store and Sports Direct, with the landlords still to decide what they will do with the remaining upper floors.
