= Joseph Della Porta =

Former department store in Shrewsbury

Joseph Della Porta was a department store located in The Square, Shrewsbury.

== History ==
Founder Joseph Della Porta came to England in 1847 from Italy, and by 1857 had opened a small store on Princess Street, Shrewsbury. He expanded the business by purchasing other stores right up to The Square. By 1869 Joseph's son-in-law Augustine Alfred Rabnett joined the business as a partner and the store traded as Joseph Della Porta Son & Rabnett. Rabnett later left the partnership to open his own store, and the business reverted to the name Joseph Della Porta & Son, with Joseph's son John Lewis Della Porta taking over the reins upon the death of Joseph in 1904.

In 1929 John died, and his son Joseph William Della Porta took over, incorporating the business as a private limited company in 1930. Joseph William was the last member of the Della Porta family to run the business but continued to grow the business by buying additional property fronting the High Street.

In 1948 the business was purchased by the department store chain Hide & Co, who ran Della Portas as a subsidiary, with another Shrewsbury business purchased by Hide & Co in 1950 – drapers Edwin Powell & Son being run by Della Portas. The business continued to grow and by 1957 the store had over 40 departments. In 1975 Hide & Co was purchased by House of Fraser who rebranded the store under the Rackhams name. The store today is now House of Fraser Shrewsbury.
