= Arnotts (Scottish department store) =

Department store in Scotland

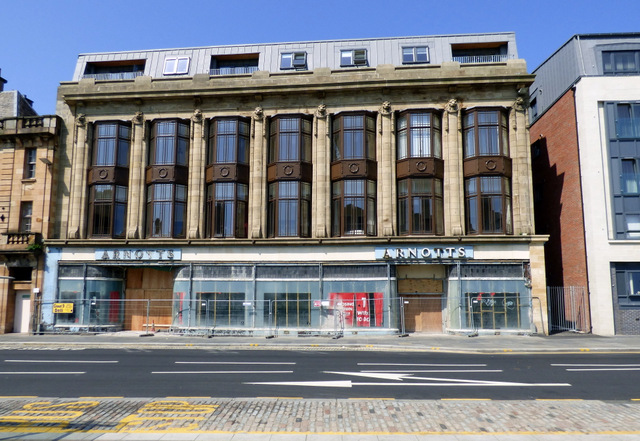
- Former Arnott's department store, Paisley
- Company type: Private company
- Industry: Retail
- Genre: Department store
- Founded: 1850; 176 years ago
- Founders: John Arnott
- Defunct: 1936
- Headquarters: Jamaica Street, Glasgow, Scotland
- Area served: Glasgow

Arnotts was a department store in Glasgow, Scotland. Established as a drapery shop in 1850, the business became a department store in the 1870s. In 1936 it was bought by the company that became House of Fraser, who used the Arnotts brand for other acquisitions from the 1970s onwards.

== History ==
The store was opened by John Arnott as a subsidiary of Arnott, Cannock & Co of Dublin in 1850 in Jamaica Street as a drapery. During 1886 the partnership between Arnott and Cannock was dissolved and Thomas Arnott, half brother of John, ran the store under the name of Arnott & Co.

In 1864, the building was acquired from the trustees of the City of Glasgow Bank, expanding the store so by 1874 it was a department store. In 1891 the business was incorporated and by 1906 the store frontage was remodelled. During the 1920s and 1930s the company started to struggle and in 1936, Fraser, Sons & Co Ltd bought the business and created a new Arnott & Co company. Frasers modernised the store with the second and third floor being opened up to showroom space, and the addition of an elevator. In 1938, it was merged by Frasers with neighbour Robert Simpson & Sons, whom they had also purchased in 1936, to create Arnott-Simpson Ltd. The two stores were reconstructed as one. In 1947, the Arnott-Simpson company was liquidated, along with Fraser, Sons & Co, and Arnotts became a trading name of the House of Fraser.

Further department stores acquired by House of Fraser were successively re-branded as Arnotts during the 1970s and 80s, the trading name eventually being applied to the majority of the group's stores in Scotland. These included stores of the former T. Baird & Sons group and two of House of Fraser's seven Edinburgh stores (including Patrick Thomson). House of Fraser closed its last remaining Arnotts store, that in Paisley (formerly Robert Cochran & Sons purchased 1964), in January 2004.
