= J J Allen =

Former British retail group

J J Allen was a small retail group that formed in 1860 in Bournemouth, Dorset, England.

The business was incorporated in 1899 by Mr J J Allen as a furniture shop, removal company and funeral directors (which still exist as an independent company).

The business expanded to a small chain of department stores, as well the Chanelle and Mayron chain of fashion shops. The expansion included department stores Brights of Bristol & Bournemouth 1960, Brights & Colson of Exeter 1960, Cavendish House (Cheltenham) and Morgan Squire Leicester 1962. In 1961 JJ Allen bought the Cardiff department store James Howell & Co, but sold it for a substantial profit in 1962 to the Hodge group, managed by Dr Julian Hodge, a Welsh merchant banker.

In 1969 House of Fraser purchased JJ Allen for £5.3 million. In 1971, House of Fraser purchased another department store group, Dingles group, and JJ Allen's west country stores were transferred to the Dingles division with the rest being transferred to the Harrods division.

The store was renamed House of Fraser in 2007.
