= Joplings =

Former department store in Sunderland

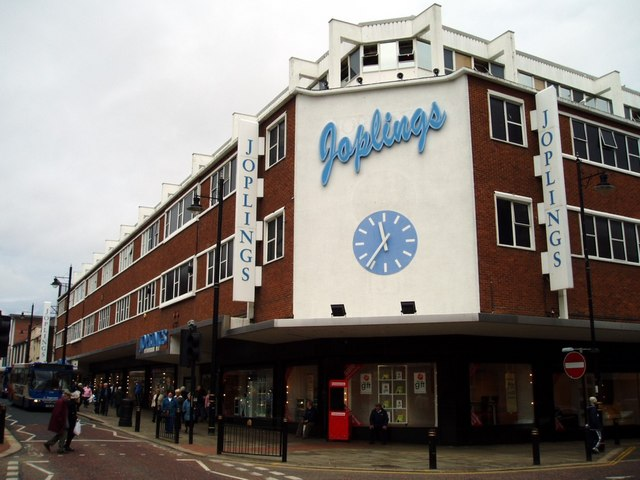
- Joplings Department Store on John Street, Sunderland (2005)
- Company type: Retail
- Industry: Retail
- Genre: Department Store
- Founded: 1804; 222 years ago
- Founder: James Jopling and Joseph Tuer
- Defunct: June 2010; 16 years ago
- Headquarters: Sunderland, England
- Key people: David Thompson
- Owner: Vergo Retail Ltd
- Website: Vergo Retail - Joplings Homepage

Joplings was a department store, located in Sunderland, England, which was part of the former Vergo Retail Ltd. group of department stores.

== History ==
The store was established in 1804 by James Jopling and soon he went into partnership with Joseph Tuer. In 1891 the business was bought by Hedley, Swan & Co as a drapery, clothing and furniture warehouse. Hedley, Swan & Co changed the name from Joplings and Truer, even though locals still called it Joplings. Hedley, Swan & Co bought rival department store J T Calvert and moved the store to the new site at 126-129 High Street West where they started using the Joplings name.

In December 1954 the store burnt down and operated from temporary space until its present purpose-built building opened in 1956. As flames ripped through Joplings on 13 December 1954, 100 firefighters battled to save the 150-year-old store.

By morning, however, just rubble remained – along with a sign proclaiming 'Santa Claus is here today.' Joplings, a shopping institution since 1804, was at the height of its busy Christmas season when disaster struck. Such was the scale of the inferno that the fiery glow from the High Street building could be seen for 20 miles around. "Narrow streets became valleys of heat, driving back the firefighters, with masonry collapsing on hose pipes," a reporter at the scene later recalled. "The worst moment came when firemen playing their hoses on the front of the store suddenly realised the building on the opposite side of the road had also taken fire. "Within seconds, they were at the centre of a ring of fire." But as masonry crashed into the street, and girders twisted in the heat, the brave firemen battled on – sadly in vain. "The intense heat could be felt by onlookers 80 yards away," the reporter revealed. "By 2am flames were tearing through the roof and the interior glowed like a furnace. "The next day, all that remained was the shell if the building. It was Sunderland's biggest fire of the century." Within a week, however, local storekeepers helped to put Joplings back in business, by offering accommodation for the different departments at premises throughout the town. Just six weeks later a temporary store was opened at the old High Street site and, within 18 months, a new Joplings was built in John Street.

In early 2005 the store was purchased from its previous owners, Merchant Retail Group plc, together with Robbs of Hexham, by Liverpool-based Owen Owen Ltd., for £5 million and another £3 million for stock.

On 18 May 2007, it was announced that a newly formed company, Vergo Retail, had taken over the three remaining Owen Owen stores. Vergo Retail was spearheaded by David Thompson, a former director of Mothercare, Habitat and more recently director and shareholder of Mark One which was sold in 2004 for £55m.

Other departments include Sound & Vision, Wines & Spirits and The Christmas Department.

On 7 May 2010, Vergo was placed into administration, with MCR appointed as the administrators. On 11 May 2010, it was announced that there would be ten store closures, including Joplings, within the next four weeks unless a buyer was found. A final closure date of Saturday 19 June 2010 has now been set.

In September 2017, planning permission was granted for the building to be turned into a purpose built student accommodation. Groovy Students Student Accommodation renovated the entire building to create 114 rooms for students and 4 commercial units on the ground floor. Spokesman Steven Kwan from 5 Star PR Marketing, a PR Marketing agency in Newcastle said "Joplings is a Sunderland institution which goes back decades and it was such a shame when it went into administration in 2010. "It would be such a shame for all that history to be lost, but we’ve managed to keep some of it, such as with the name. The public reaction to the site is so strong that the name Jopling House was a no brainer for us so that we could carry that legacy on."

On 2 January 2019, Joplings Department store opened its doors for the first time in 9 years as Jopling House.
