= Peroff =

Peroff is a surname. Notable people with the surname include:

- Justin Peroff (born 1977), Canadian musician
- Nicholas Peroff (born 1944), American political scientist and academic

== See also ==
- Perloff
- Persoff
