= Big Dig (disambiguation) =

The Big Dig was a highway-construction project in Boston.

Big Dig may also refer to:

- The Big Dig Archaeological Site, an archaeology site in Sydney, New South Wales, Australia
- The Big Dig (film), a 1969 Israeli comedy film
- Big Dig (Liverpool)
- Big Dig (Regina, Saskatchewan)
- The Big Dig also refers to the Wawa Drop-In Project or Big Dig held at Wawa, Ontario, in 1971
- White House Big Dig

== Other uses ==
- The Erie Canal, while it was being constructed; also sometimes called "Clinton's Big Dig", after Governor DeWitt Clinton
