= Vergo Retail =

Former department store company

Vergo Retail Ltd
- Company type: Private
- Industry: Retail
- Founded: 2007; 19 years ago
- Founder: David Thompson
- Defunct: 2010; 16 years ago
- Headquarters: Liverpool, United Kingdom
- Number of locations: 20 at peak
- Revenue: £15.824 million (2008)
- Operating income: £(2.482) million (2008)
- Net income: £(2.416) million (2008)
- Owner: David Thompson
- Number of employees: 942
- Divisions: Department Stores; Homemaker Stores; Vergo at Home; Fashion, Home & More! The Jewellery Store
- Website: http://www.vergoretail.co.uk

Vergo Retail Ltd was a department store business based in Liverpool, England, founded in 2007. Vergo Retail ran 20 shops, consisting of nine department stores, including Lewis's of Liverpool, Robbs of Hexham, Joplings of Sunderland and Derrys of Plymouth and four others in Essex, Suffolk and Norfolk; four Homemaker stores in Devon, four home and fashion stores in Essex and Suffolk; two home stores in Essex; and a jewellery store in Colchester. The company entered administration in 2010.

== History ==
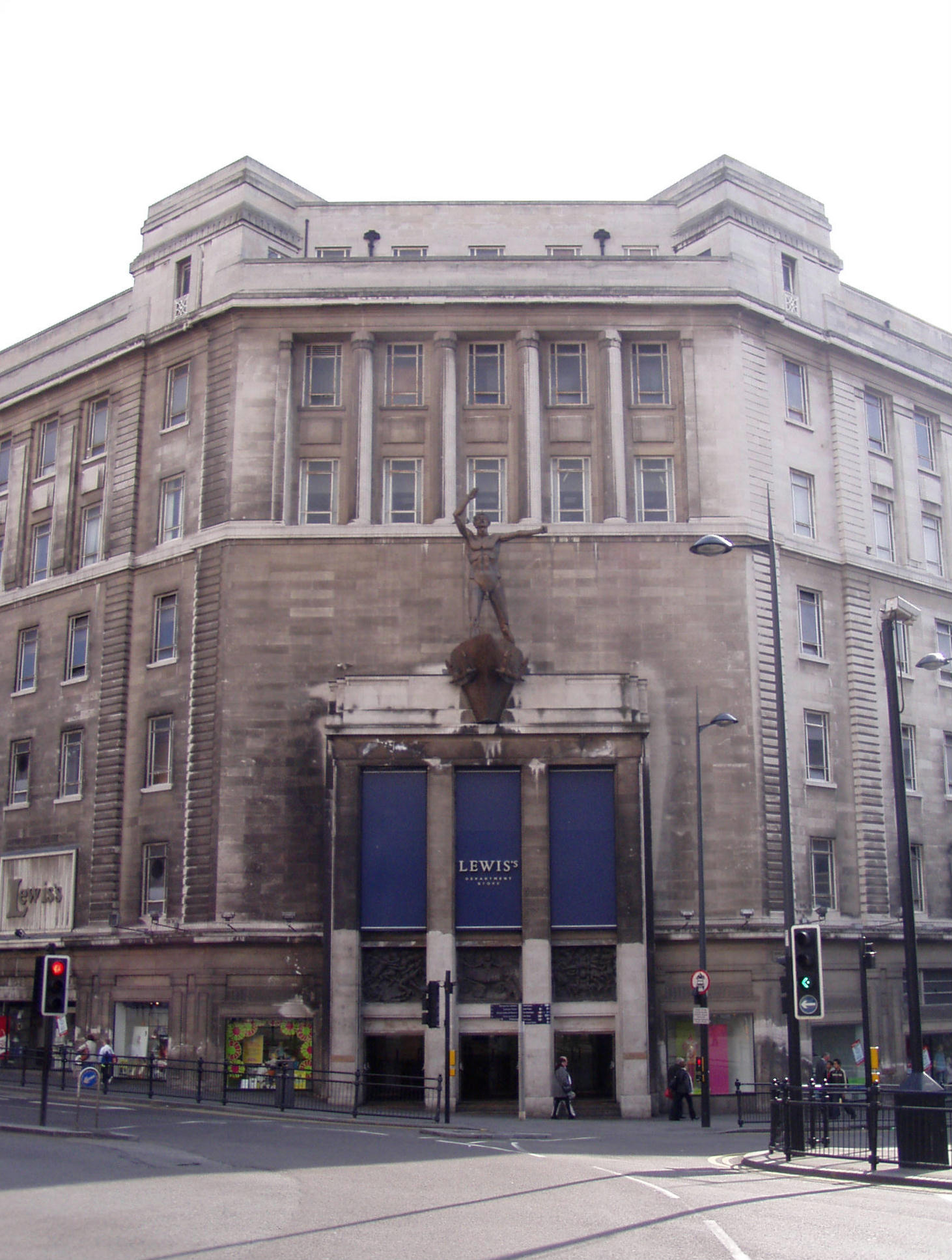
Lewis's Department Store, Liverpool

Vergo Retail was formed in May 2007 in order to acquire Lewis's, Robbs and Joplings from Owen Owen Ltd which was in administration. The company was owned by David Thompson, the owner of Owen Owen and a former director of Mothercare, Habitat and British Home Stores, and later director and shareholder of MK One which was sold in 2004 for £55m.

In 2009 Vergo Retail entered a further phase of growth, acquiring the department store operations of two co-operative societies. First, in February 2009, Plymouth and South West Co-operative Society (Plymco) agreed to sell its non-food business to Vergo. This consisted of Derrys department store in Plymouth, and four Homemaker stores in Devon and Cornwall. Vergo Retail took control of these stores on 15 March 2009. Secondly, on 16 June 2009, it was announced that Vergo Retail would take over the East of England Co-operative Society department stores at sites in Norfolk, Suffolk and Essex, with the 350 current staff employed by the East of England Co-operative expected to keep their jobs during the transfer. Department stores in Norwich, Ipswich, Great Yarmouth, Clacton-on-Sea and Colchester, along with six specialist home stores and one jewellery store, were transferred to Vergo Retail on 4 July 2009 with the East of England Co-operative Society retaining the freehold.

=== Decline and administration ===
On 22 January 2010 it was announced that Lewis's of Liverpool was to close by June 2010 as the lease from the landlords, Merepark, expired then and it could not be renewed owing to a planned redevelopment of the building. As a result, a closing down sale was launched to sell around £5 million of stock, as well as fixtures and fittings. Vergo's head office, which was also located in the Renshaw Street premises, would continue to operate from there in the short term until alternative accommodation was available.

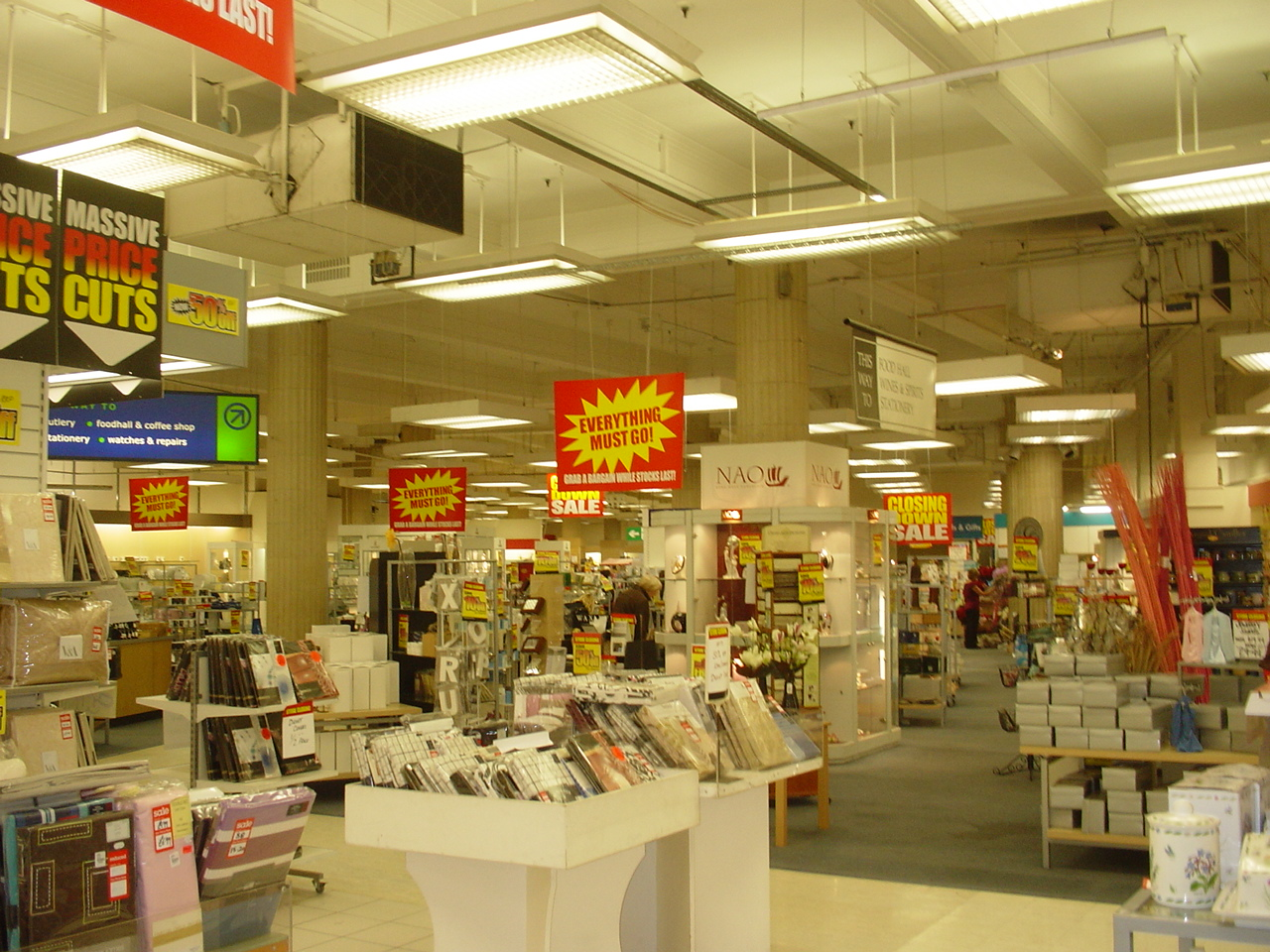
Closing down sale at Lewis's store in Liverpool

On 7 May 2010 Vergo was placed into administration, with MCR appointed as the administrators. From 11 May 2010, 335 staff were made redundant and it was announced that there would be ten store closures within the next four weeks unless a buyer was found. These were Lewis's of Liverpool (already scheduled for closure), Robbs of Hexham, Joplings of Sunderland, Derry's of Plymouth, the "Fashion, Home & More!" stores in Witham, Clacton-on-Sea, Stowmarket and Dovercourt, the department store in Norwich and The Jewellery Store in Colchester. This left ten stores open, namely the Homemaker stores in Kingsteignton, Launceston, Exmouth and Cothill (Plymouth); the Vergo at Home stores at Stanway (Colchester) and Clacton-on-Sea; the "Fashion Home & More!" store in Felixstowe and the Ipswich, Great Yarmouth and Colchester department stores. By 21 May 2010, Beales had lodged a formal notice of interest in Robbs of Hexham, whilst the administrators asked the Buccleuch Group, owners of the building, and Northumberland County Council to waive rent and rates for ten weeks, to allow the business to be continued to be marketed as a going concern.

On 25 May 2010 it was announced that closing down sales would begin at all stores in the chain, managed by Hilco, and Lewis's would close on Saturday 29 May. By this point the Dovercourt store had closed and 341 staff had been made redundant across the chain. The administrators continued to negotiate with various potential purchasers, who were interested in all or part of the business. The sales were to ensure that there was sufficient cash to fund the business in the short term. One of these parties was revealed to be Chris Dawson, owner of The Range, who said "I am interested in a few of the stores, parts of the group and all of the stock." Tony Brown, chief executive of Beales, confirmed that he was still interested in Robbs and Beales acquired Robbs on 4 June for £250,000. By 26 June 2010 just four stores remained open, and these closed within a week. Both the East of England Co-operative Society and the Co-operative Group offered their former employees compensation packages, despite not being legally obliged to do so. In January 2011 Metis Partners was appointed to sell brand assets, including the Derrys, Joplings, Lewis's and Owen Owen names and related domain names.

The company was dissolved in August 2014.

== Stores ==
At its peak there were twenty Vergo stores operating in five divisions.

Store Name	Type
Derrys of Plymouth	Department Store
Joplings of Sunderland	Department Store
Lewis's of Liverpool	Department Store
Robbs of Hexham	Department Store
Colchester	Department Store
Great Yarmouth	Department Store
Ipswich	Department Store
Norwich	Department Store
Clacton-on-Sea	Vergo Fashion Home & More!
Dovercourt	Vergo Fashion Home & More!
Felixstowe	Vergo Fashion Home & More!
Stowmarket	Vergo Fashion Home & More!
Witham	Vergo Fashion Home & More!
Cothill (Plymouth)	Homemaker
Exmouth	Homemaker
Kingsteignton	Homemaker
Launceston	Homemaker
Clacton-on-Sea	Vergo at Home
Stanway (Colchester)	Vergo at Home
Colchester	The Jewellery Store
