= Owen Owen =

Former department store chain in the United Kingdom and Canada

Owen Owen Ltd
- Type: Retail
- Industry: Retail
- Genre: Department store
- Founded: 1868; 158 years ago
- Founder: Owen Owen
- Defunct: 2007; 19 years ago
- Headquarters: Liverpool, England
- Key people: Owen Owen

Owen Owen was a Liverpool-based operator of department stores in the United Kingdom and Canada. Beginning with a drapery shop in Liverpool, a chain of department stores was built up, often by taking over rival retailers. The company remained under Owen / Norman family control until the 1980s, and the brand ceased to be used in 2007.

== Founder and early history ==
Owen Owen was born on 13 October 1847 at Cwmrhaeadr near Machynlleth at the westernmost tip of Montgomeryshire, Wales. His family were hill farmers. Welsh agriculture had prospered during the Napoleonic Wars when imports of food were restricted but, after the war, there was such a severe depression that in 1838 the farm which had been their home for generations had to be mortgaged and the following year sold. Owen Owen was the first child of his father's second wife (Esther Elizabeth Evans), but she died after giving birth to her sixth child when Owen Owen was only eight. His mother had a brother, Samuel Evans (c.1817-1885), who needed help to run his draper's shop in Bath; so Owen Owen went to Bath and his uncle gave him both a home and an education. He was educated at the Wesleyan College, Taunton, and started working at his uncle's shop in 1860.

In 1868, at the age of 20, with some help from Uncle Samuel, Owen Owen opened his own draper's emporium at 121 London Road, Liverpool, close to where his father's brother, Robert, had had a shop at number 93. By 1873 Owen Owen had over 120 employees, many from Wales, and a quarter of an acre of floor space. Owen Owen was interested in his staff's well-being. Besides being the first employer in Liverpool to give staff a half day off each week, he also set up a trust fund for retired employees. In the 1880s he began investing in other enterprises including railways, and in 1889 became director of Evans & Owen Ltd in Bath, the shop started by his uncle. He moved to London in 1891, after marrying, but continued to manage the Liverpool store which became one of the largest stores in the north of England. He also invested in many other stores and estates. Owen's daughter went onto marry into the Liverpool based family of Norman, and it was under Duncan Norman, and then his son John, who would lead the company from the 1920s.

In his private life he was an active supporter of many Welsh organisations. He died of cancer in London on 27 March 1910 at the age of 62.

== Expansion and collapse ==
Owen Owen opened a drapery shop at 121 London Road, Liverpool. Over the years the store expanded, but in the 1920s when the city's retail focus moved away from the London Road area, the Owen family lent the company the money to move to a better position on Clayton Square where a large purpose-built department store (originally designed as a luxury hotel) was erected. The company then purchased rival chain T. J. Hughes, after a visit by then chairman Duncan Norman, and moved that firm's Liverpool store into the empty London Road premises.

Owen Owen expanded by building a store in Coventry in 1937, and purchasing Frederick Matthews in Preston. The architect of the Coventry store was Gerald de Courcy Fraser. It was fire-bombed by the IRA S-Plan campaign on 5 February 1939 with no casualties, but on 25 August 1939 a bomb in a bicycle near the store left five dead and 70 injured. The original Owen Owen building remained open until it was struck by an incendiary bomb in the Coventry Blitz on 14 November 1940. After the war, Owen Owen continued to expand, purchasing G W Robinson Ltd in Canada during 1951, and adding other stores to the UK portfolio while the Coventry and Southampton stores were rebuilt.

A subsidiary company, Plumb (Contract Furnishers and Shopfitters) Ltd., was created from its own shopfitting department and had offices at Bishop Street, Coventry and Kempston Street, Liverpool. In 1973, the company won a takeover battle for South West department store group James Colmer, against English Calico and its subsidiary Hide & Co. The purchase of James Colmer saw its profits jump from £7,181,000 in 1972 to £10,300,000 in 1973. In 1976, the company purchased eight stores from the Maple Macowards group, including J H Stringer and W J Wade, and completed an exchange with House of Fraser with Wrights of Richmond being exchanged for the House of Fraser Doncaster store. In 1979 the business operated 19 department stores branded either Owen Owen or under their original name but taglined as an Owen Owen store. It also operated three T. J. Hughes stores in the UK, and seven G W Robinson stores in Canada.

In the 1980s the Owen family sold the business. G W Robinson was sold in 1982 to Canadian businessman Joseph Segal and John Levy, while T. J. Hughes was split off as a separate entity. In 1991 the firm purchased several Lewis's stores from administration (not to be confused with John Lewis) and was known briefly under the business name of 'Lewis's Owen Owen', before being taken over by Philip Green in 1994.

In 1995 Green launched the brand "Kid's HQ" in four of his Lewis's and Owen Owen Stores. The company was then stripped of its assets, which included the closure of the flagship Liverpool branch of Owen Owen, and was cut from twelve stores to one, Lewis's of Liverpool, following the sale of many stores to other chains including Allders and Debenhams.

In early 2005, Philip Green sold his stake in the business to David Thompson who began a new phase of expansion at Owen Owen, acquiring Joplings and Robbs from the Merchant Retail Group and purchasing Esslemont & MacIntosh from the Esslemont family. The Owen Owen brand name was no longer used, but remained the name of the operating company.

On 28 February 2007, Owen Owen entered administration. One of the reasons given for the company's demise was the disruption caused by the Big Dig, a series of regeneration projects in Liverpool city centre. The Esslemont & MacIntosh store at Aberdeen was closed on 5 May 2007. In the same month the Liverpool, Hexham and Sunderland stores were sold as a going concern to Vergo Retail Ltd., controlled by the previous owner of Owen Owen, David Thompson, and enabling the stores to continue to trade.

== Former branches and subsidiaries ==
=== Owen Owen ===
- Liverpool, established 1868 at London Road; relocated to Clayton Square in 1925; closed 1996
- Basingstoke, The Malls, opened 1981; closed 1992
- Bath, formerly James Colmer, the original name retained on cast window frames and glass panels to the fascia after purchase in 1973; closed 1991; ground floor and partial 1st floor redeveloped as commercial units with the remainder of the building converted to residential use
- Birkenhead, opened 1959; converted to the T J Hughes format in 1965
- Blackpool, opened 1946; transferred to T J Hughes in 1965. The store was at 12–16 Bank Hey Street.
- Brighton, formerly W J Wade, purchased 1975; closed 1981
- Bristol, formerly W Morgan, acquired with the purchase of James Colmer; closed 1973
- Chester, formerly Richard Jones, purchased 1960; grocery and delicatessen business William Jones, trading at the 'Three Old Arches', was purchased at a later date and incorporated into the store as a food hall; closed 1999
- Colwyn Bay, formerly W S Wood, purchased 1975; closed 1981
- Coventry, City Centre, opened 1937; destroyed in the blitz of 1940; new building completed 1954; closed 1996 Was then an Allders. Operated by Primark since 2005.
- Crawley, County Mall, opened 1992; closed 1994
- Doncaster, formerly Verity & Sons, purchased 1950; sold to House of Fraser in 1976
- Erdington, formerly W M Taylor & Sons, purchased 1971; closed 1977. The store was at 210-216 High Street
- Evesham, formerly Hamilton & Bell, purchased 1975; closed 1982
- Hereford, Commercial Street, formerly a branch of Hamilton & Bell; acquired 1975; closed 1979
- Ilford, The Exchange, opened 1991; closed 1996
- Ipswich, Buttermarket, opened 1992; closed 1996
- Kidderminster, Swan Walk, formerly a branch of Hamilton & Bell; acquired 1975; closed 1992; transferred to T J Hughes
- Newport, formerly Reynolds, purchased 1975; closed 1989
- North Finchley, formerly Priors, purchased 1963; closed 1993
- Preston, formerly Frederick Matthew, purchased 1937; closed 1989
- Redditch, Kingfisher Centre, opened 1980; closed 1996
- Richmond, formerly Wright Brothers, purchased from House of Fraser in 1976; closed 1990
- Shrewsbury, formerly R Maddox & Co, purchased 1976 from Macowards; closed 1990
- Slough, formerly Suters, purchased 1978; closed 1996
- Southampton, formerly E Mayes & Son, purchased 1949; closed 1994
- Stourbridge, formerly J H Stringer, purchased 1975; closed 1990;the building, part of which started life as a cinema and was converted for use by Stringers, was demolished in 1995
- Taunton, formerly Clements & Brown, acquired with the purchase of James Colmer in 1973; closed 1979
- Uxbridge, formerly Suters, purchased 1978; closed 1998. Location now a Sports Direct store
- Weston-super-Mare, formerly B T Butter, acquired with the purchase of James Colmer in 1973; closed 1993
- Wolverhampton, Mander Centre, opened 1968; closed 1991; transferred to T J Hughes; a new store for Debenhams was later constructed on the site, closing in 2020

=== T J Hughes ===
- Liverpool, London Road
- Birkenhead, transferred from Owen Owen in 1965
- Blackpool, transferred from Owen Owen in 1965; closed 1971; premises sold to W H Smith
- Bootle, opened 1968
- Kidderminster, transferred from Owen Owen
- Leicester, opened 1967; closed 1969
- St. Helens, opened 1988
- Wolverhampton, transferred from Owen Owen

=== Lewis's ===
Purchased in 1991.

- Liverpool
- Hanley, Stoke-on-Trent
- Leeds
- Leicester
- Manchester
- Oxford

=== Other department stores ===
- Aberdeen, Esslemont & Macintosh, purchased 2005, closed 2007
- Hexham, Robbs, purchased 2005
- Southport, Boothroyds, purchased 1990, closed 1993
- Southport, Broadbents, purchased 1990, closed 1993
- Sunderland, Joplings, purchased 2005

== Former G W Robinson stores in Canada ==
- Burlington Centre, Burlington, Ontario
- Centre Mall, Hamilton, Ontario
- James Street South, Hamilton, Ontario
- Eastgate Square, Hamilton, Ontario
- Lime Ridge Mall, Hamilton, Ontario
- The Pen Centre, St. Catharines
- Niagara Square Shopping Centre, Niagara Falls, Ontario
- Conestoga Mall, Waterloo, Ontario

== The Owen Owen Trust Fund ==
The trust fund continues as a registered charity, supporting those who were formerly employed by any company in the Owen Owen group, together with their spouses and dependents.

== Sources ==
- David Wyn Davies: Owen Owen: Victorian Draper (Gwasg Cambria, Aberystwyth, 1983) ISBN 0-900439-16-5
