= Walter Gardiner Photography =

Defunct photography business in England

- Industry: Photography
- Founded: 1860
- Founder: Henry Jenkins
- Defunct: 2005
- Fate: Receivership
- Headquarters: Worthing, United Kingdom

Walter Gardiner Photography was a photography business based in Worthing, West Sussex, England.

The firm, which until 1995 was family owned through three generations of photographers, traces its roots to the very earliest days of photography. Thanks to a Lottery grant, the firm's archives are now held for posterity by West Sussex Past Pictures, the curator of West Sussex County Library Service's archives of photographs, prints, drawings and paintings.

== History ==
The firm was founded in about 1860 by Henry Jenkins. His daughter, Annie, learned the emerging craft from her father. In 1887 Annie Jenkins married Walter James Gardiner and the couple set sail for New Zealand. However, a deteriorating business climate there forced a change of plans and they decided to settle in Bairnsdale, Australia, where the company of Gardiner & Co. was first incorporated.

Annie and Walter returned from Australia in 1893. Settling in Worthing, they bought Edward Pett's portrait studio in Bath Place. Established by Samuel Fox around 1859, the studio passed to his widow in 1867. It was bought by James Russell & Sons of Chichester in 1873 and managed by Edward Pattison Pett from 1877 until 1880 when he took over the business. Pett ran the firm for 13 years until selling it to Annie and Walter Gardiner in 1893.

In the last decade of the 19th century, the business was mainly portraiture. In the first decade of the new century Walter and Annie developed a new line of business: postcards. Their decision was made only five weeks after the Royal Mail decided to allow private individuals and firms to make their own postcards. This was the first of several re-orientations the firm made in over a century of continuous business operation.

In 1930, Walter and Annie's son, William, took over the business, expanding into retail, developing and processing, weddings and some commercial work. The firm ran a small shop in the Arcade, a shopping precinct very near Worthing's promenade.

Derek Gardiner, William's son and the third generation in the family to own and run the firm, took over in 1960. With the growth of amateur photography, formal portraiture was on the decline. At the same time the South Coast was seeing significant growth in light industry. Derek decided to drop both portraiture and the retail business which he saw as a distraction, and concentrate on building a commercial and industrial photography business. At the time, the business had its studio and the shop in the Arcade, with a separate laboratory nearby. This fundamental shift in focus involved closing the laboratory, the studio and the retail shop, leasing the premises and building a new studio and processing lab in East Worthing. In 1984 Derek Gardiner was named Ilford's photographer of the year.

In 1980 Derek brought in an assistant, 24-year-old Mike Hemsley, a talented up-and-coming photographer and later two-time winner of the Ilford photographer of the year award (1985 and 1989). Hemsley bought into the business between 1990 and 1995 continuing to pay rent for the studio to Derek Gardiner who retired in 1995. Hemsley delayed making the transition to digital capture, partly because of the high capital costs of professional imaging equipment and low image quality of the first generation of digital cameras, and partly because of demand from existing customers for the creative analog techniques he had pioneered. The studio concentrated instead on digital post-production of film images. Ultimately, digital capture improved to the point where for most customers, the speed of delivery digital workflow offered was more important than the difference in image quality. The rapid improvement in digital quality and a shift in use from print to the web left the firm un-competitive and it went into receivership in 2005. In 2007, Hemsley placed almost 150,000 archive images from the years 1890 to 2000 into the hands of Worthing Library Services to preserve them for future generations via digital scanning for which they successfully obtained a Heritage Lottery Grant.

== Photographic archive ==
In its more than 112-year history, Walter Gardiner Photography has accumulated an archive of images of historical importance. The archive of about 1,100 photographs afford an extraordinary glimpse into the past. Examples include the Norfolk Arms, a pub in Arundel High Street photographed in 1905 and which remains largely unchanged to this day; Bentalls, a department store and a fixture in Worthing for over 100 years; and early photographs documenting some of the first ever flights in Britain at Shoreham Airport (Shoreham-by-Sea) in 1910. The archive is of considerable importance both to students of photography and students of 19th century England.
