= Persoff =

Persoff is a surname. Notable people with the surname include:

- Ethan Persoff (born 1974), American cartoonist, archivist, and sound artist
- Nehemiah Persoff (1919–2022), American character actor and painter

== See also ==
- Perloff
- Peroff
