= Palmers Department Store =

Department store in Great Yarmouth, Norfolk, England

Coordinates: 52°36′28″N 1°43′36″E

- Company type: Retail
- Founded: 1837; 189 years ago
- Defunct: 15 March 2020 (Great Yarmouth); 19 March 2020 (Lowestoft)
- Fate: Administration and Dissolved
- Headquarters: 37-39 Market Place, Great Yarmouth, Norfolk NR30 1LX, England
- Number of employees: 70 in Great Yarmouth store and 30 in Lowestoft store
- Parent: Beales
- Website: palmerstores.com (Archive)

Palmers Department Store was an independent and family-run department store located in Great Yarmouth, Norfolk. Latterly the company boasted that it was the 'longest established independent department store in the United Kingdom'.

In late 2018, Palmers was sold to Beales which took over the operations of the brand's Great Yarmouth and Lowestoft branches.

== History ==
Palmers traced its history back to June 1837 when Garwood Burton Palmer opened a small linens and drapery shop in Great Yarmouth Market Place. In 1844 his younger brother Nathaniel Palmer joined the business. In 1888, when Garwood Palmer died at the age of 73, the business transferred into the hands of Nathaniel Palmer's sons and the business became known as Palmer Brothers. The shop was the first building in Great Yarmouth to be illuminated by electricity in the town in 1902.

Palmers survived two major fires and bomb damage. It was until 2018 owned and run by descendants of the store's original founder. The company expanded in the 1990s and 2000s taking on stores in Bury St Edmunds, Dereham and Lowestoft. It has previously had a branch in Red Lion Street, Norwich.

In 2012 a blue plaque was placed outside the Conservative Club of Gorleston by the Great Yarmouth Local History and Archaeological Society, to commemorate the former home of the founder Garwood Burton Palmer.

In 2014 the Dereham store was sold to Basil Todd, and closed in March 2015.

== Sale to Beales, administration and closure ==
In 2018, Palmers' remaining two stores, (Great Yarmouth, in Norfolk and Lowestoft, in Suffolk), were acquired by Beales Department Stores, bringing Palmers’ run of being family-owned for 180 years to an end.

When Palmers was sold, a significant loss was taken by the chain's former owner, who realised that there was no future for the department store on its own. The buildings that Palmers owned were sold, Lowestoft for £830,000 and Great Yarmouth for £1.5m; these were then leased back to Palmers. When the chain was sold to Beales, the building leases were also sold and Palmers became a trading name of Beales.

On 20 January 2020, Beales entered administration following continuous losses. Palmers survived the first round of closures announced on 9 February 2020, however it was later announced on 18 February 2020 that all of Beales stores were to close.

At the beginning of March 2020, it was confirmed that the Great Yarmouth store would close on 15 March 2020 and the administrators expected the Lowestoft store to continue trading until the end of March in line with Beales other estate. The cafe at the Great Yarmouth store closed on 7 March 2020 and all access to the lower floors was restricted and on 14 March 2020 the branch of Hays Travel, an ex-Thomas Cook branch, also closed, with all staff being relocated temporarily to Lowestoft whilst a new branch was sought; with the Great Yarmouth store finally closing at 3pm on 15 March 2020.

It was originally anticipated that the Lowestoft branch would continue to trade until at least the end of March or even early-April, however the closure date was brought forward due to the COVID-19 outbreak, and the store closed in line with Beales other stores early on 18 March 2020, after this the Palmers name, as with Beales, ceased to exist ending 183 years of trading.
