= Fenwick Colchester =

Large high street department store situated in Colchester, Essex, England

Coordinates: 51°53′23.38″N 0°53′52.89″E

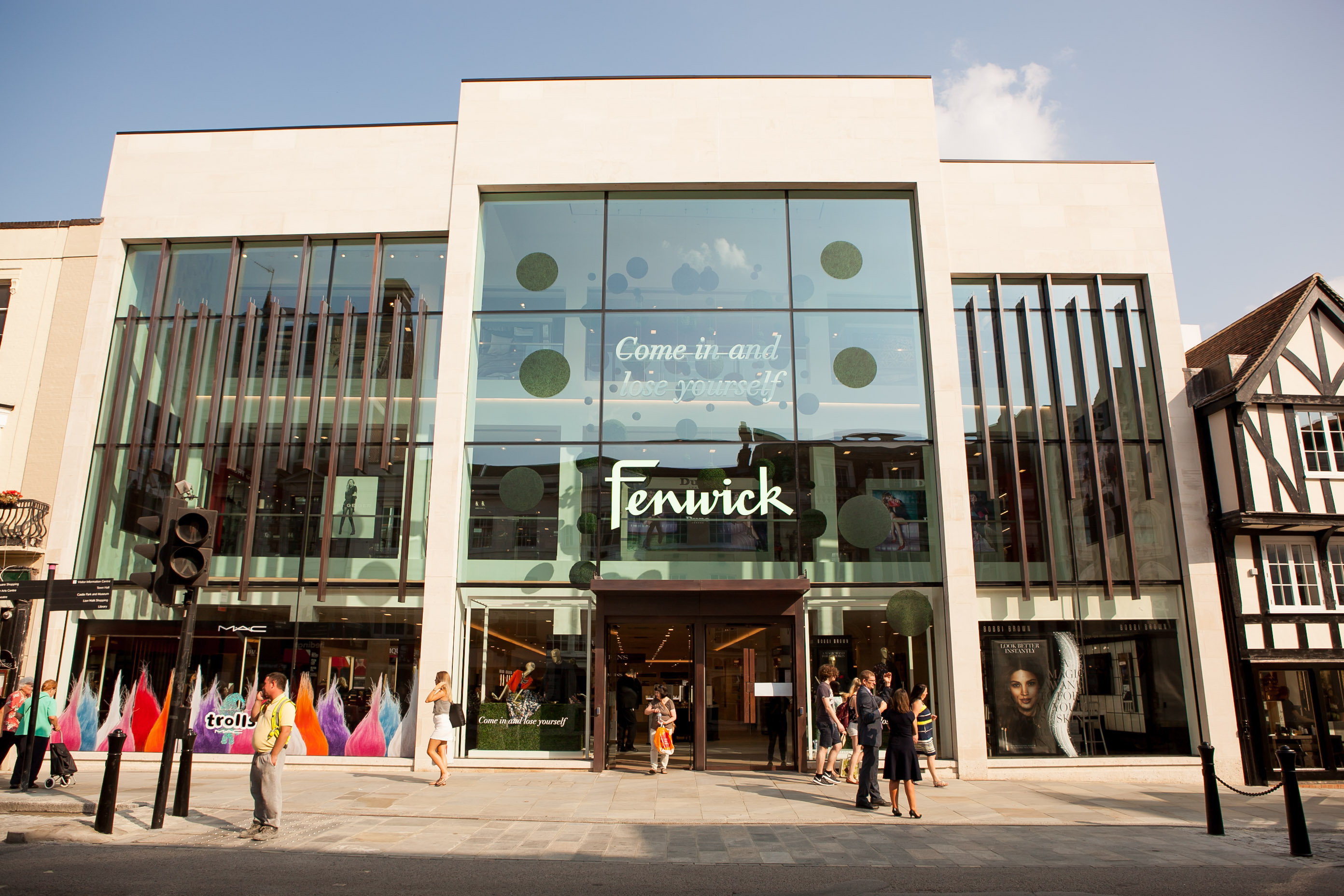
- The main site in Colchester High Street, pictured in September 2016
- Company type: Department Store
- Industry: Retail
- Founded: 2015; Constituent parts older
- Founder: Herbert E. Williams (1862–1920); Henry L. Griffin (1855–1916)
- Headquarters: Colchester, United Kingdom
- Parent: Fenwick
- Website: http://www.fenwick.co.uk/colchester/

Fenwick Colchester is a large high street department store situated in Colchester, Essex, England, formerly known as Williams & Griffin (1963–2016).

Independent for much of its history, it was formed from the merger of H.E. Williams & Co Ltd (an ironmonger and agricultural machinery business) and another Colchester family business, H.L. Griffin & Co Ltd (a furnishings store), in April 1963. In 2007, Williams & Griffin won "Best Independent Department Store of the Year", sponsored by Drapers. The store was sold in March 2008 to the Fenwick chain of department stores. Current departments include beauty, fashion, toys, gifts, housewares and furniture, as well as top-floor restaurant Carluccio's.

== H. L. Griffin & Co. ==
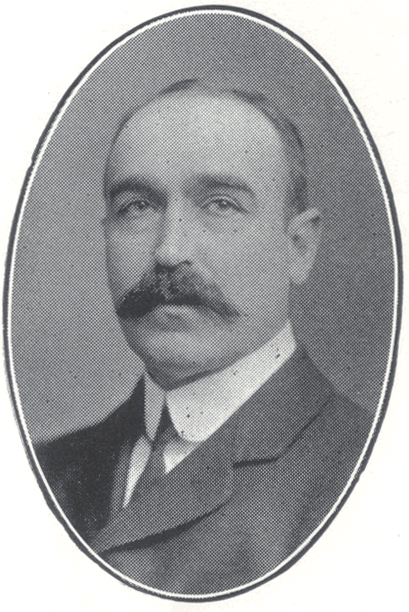
Henry Griffin pictured before 1916 in his role as President of the Old Colcestrian Society

H. L. Griffin & Co had its beginnings early in the nineteenth century, when a William Griffin set up as a linen draper along with a business partner with the surname Barrell. It was not long, however, before Griffin was independent and adding haberdashery to his business, with premises at 5 and 6 Botolph Street; they were extended in number 7 in the 1840s. At the same time a shop on the High Street was opened (number 50) but this closed after a few years, making way for premises on Head Street. In March 1855, William Griffin Senior retired, leaving the business to his son William, which was now styled "Griffin and Son". Another son, George Lainson Griffin, set up another drapery business on Botolph Street whilst a third, John Edward Griffin, set up as an auctioneer, valuer and estate agent on Queen Street, the same profession to which William Griffin Jr. also turned his hand after selling his drapery business in 1861.

In the 1870s George set up a High Street Shop; not long afterwards he was succeeded in this by his son by Henry Lainson Griffin (1855–1916), certainly before 1891. Henry was primarily an upholsterer, the second of five children born to George and his wife Caroline Collins, of Stanway, Essex. Certainly, the company swapped its Colchester High Street premises on February 1, 1900 for new ones on Head Street, where it remained until 1963. Originally dealing in the sale or let of both soft furnishings such as "eider down quilts, coal vases etc" and houses, the former was its only enterprise at the time of merger with H. E. Williams. Its logo was a griffin; this remained in the weeks following the merger, despite the accompanying company name being altered.

== H. E. Williams & Co. ==
H. E. Williams & Co., an ironmonger and agricultural machinery business, was founded by Herbert E. Williams (1862–1920) before 1882 as Williams and Co.. It was registered as a limited company in 1922. It traded both at High Street premises (which now form the modern site of Williams & Griffin), and later also at roomier premises on Cowdray Avenue further from the town centre, from where it sold most of its tractors and other farming equipment.

In 1950, after the sudden death of the then chairman and the managing director (also a large shareholder), the company was taken over by Kenneth Ireland (1907–1971), a farmer from nearby Feering, it has been run since 1972 by his son Bill. At the time of the merger, the company sold ironmongery, kitchenware, electrical, radio and TV and nursery goods from its High Street premises.

== Williams & Griffin ==
The Williams and Griffin logo, used until 2016

In April 1963, H. L. Griffin & Co and H.E. Williams & Co merged to form a combined enterprise employing 110 people. The Griffin premises were soon sold (within two years), and the output merged to create a single department store. Other acquisitions included A. & E.P. Baker in 1964 (a local ladies fashion store) and Heasman & Son (a jewellers on the High Street founded before 1907).

In 1966, the Griffin family sold out - their representative on the board, Jack shareholding was therefore taken up by the Ireland family, and in 1969 the final vestige of the previous businesses – Williams' Cowdray Avenue farm machinery sideline – was sold to Eastern Tractors after two years' worth of discussions, though the Ireland family kept ownership of the site. At this time, Williams & Griffin's turnover was valued at £400,000. In 1981, however, the decision was reversed and Williams & Griffin opened a garden centre on the site under the guidance of Patrick Ireland, which ran until 1990, when the site was finally sold off.

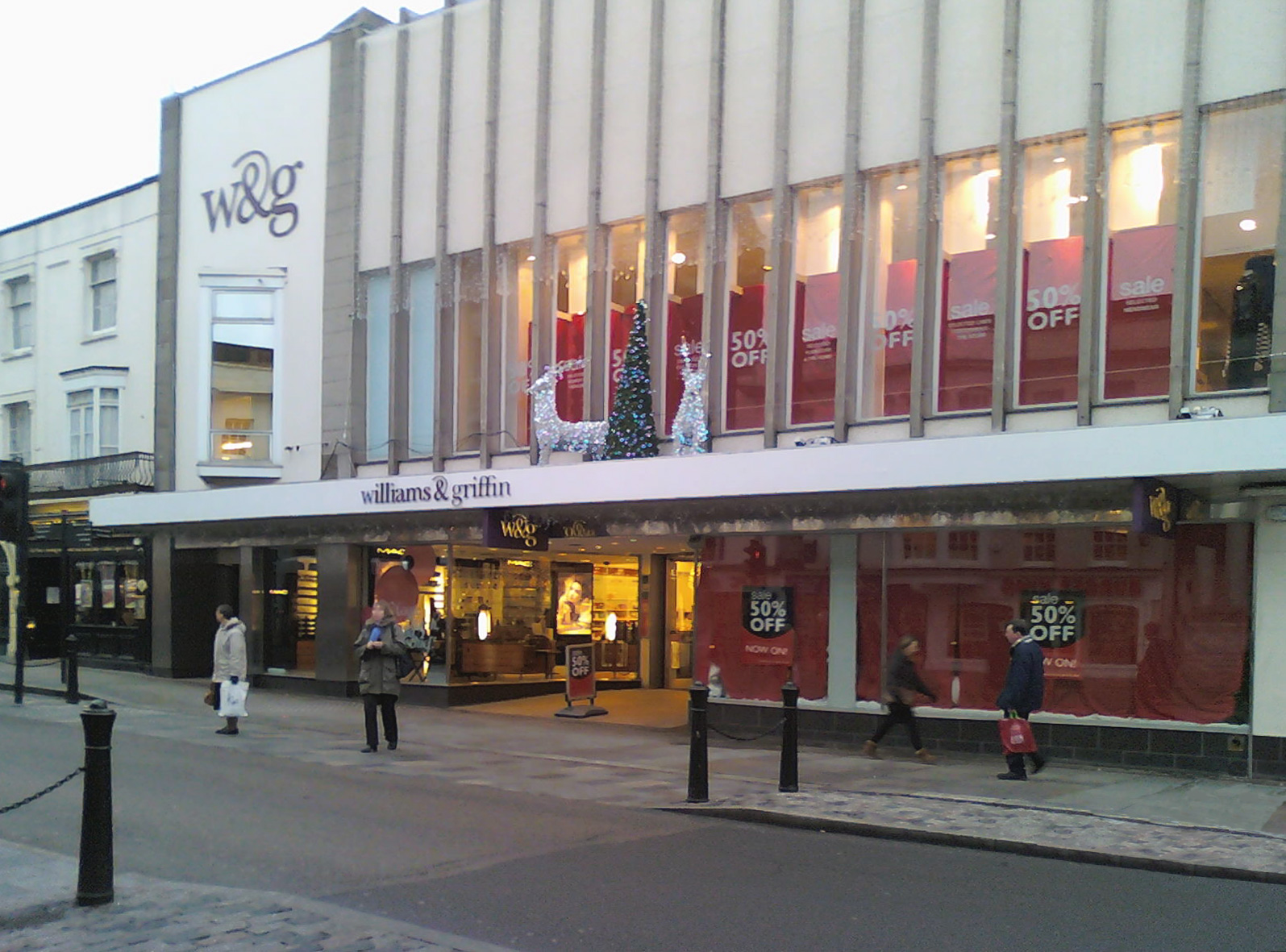
The main site in Colchester High Street, as pictured in December 2009 and using the Williams & Griffin branding.

In 2007, Williams & Griffin won "Best Independent Department Store of the Year", sponsored by Drapers. The award was picked up by Colchester's MP, Bob Russell, who proposed an early day motion on the topic.

It remained in the control of the Ireland family until its sale in March 2008 to the Fenwick chain of department stores. Current departments include fashion, toys, gifts, housewares and furniture, as well as a top-floor restaurant. In 2015, it announced that, following a major redevelopment of its site, it would rebrand under the new Fenwick name, becoming Fenwick Colchester.

== See also ==
- List of department stores
