= Perloff =

Perloff is a surname. Notable people with the surname include:

- Andrew Perloff, British businessman
- Carey Perloff (born 1959), American theatre director and playwright
- Jeffrey M. Perloff, American economist
- Marjorie Perloff (1931–2024), American literary critic
- Richard M. Perloff (born 1951), American academic
- Robert Perloff (1921–2013), American psychologist
