= Richard Jones (department store) =

Former department store in Chester, England

Richard Jones was a department store in the city of Chester, England before being bought out by defunct department store chain Owen Owen.

== History ==
Richard Jones opened a drapery business in Chester during the 1850s on Watergate Street. By 1874 the business was listed as being at 52–56 Bridge Street by Morris & Co's directory and gazetteer of Cheshire. The business expanded in 1890 by the opening of a home furnishings department located in Eastgate Street.

The business was incorporated in 1903 and expanded to include 44–46 Bridge Street and 11–13 Eastgate Street, selling a variety of clothing and household goods as well as a removal service. The business continued to be run as a family concern until 1960 when Owen Owen purchased the business.
