= Mark Fenwick =

British businessman and talent manager

- Born: Mark Anthony Fenwick; May 1948 (age 78)
- Occupations: Businessman; manager
- Known for: Chairman and owner, Fenwick
- Parent: John Fenwick

Mark Anthony Fenwick (born May 1948) is a British businessman, the fifth generation of his family to run the Fenwick department store chain founded in 1882.

Mark Anthony Fenwick was born in May 1948. He was the son of John Fenwick, who died in 2008, at age 99, and who ran the firm from 1972; having joined it in 1932 after graduating from Cambridge University, and his wife Sheila. He has a brother, James Fenwick.

Fenwick has been the manager of pop music acts Roxy Music, T. Rex and is currently Roger Waters', of Pink Floyd fame, manager. and was a director of E.G. Records.

Fenwick stepped down as chairman of Fenwick on 18 May 2017, when he was succeeded by Richard Pennycook, a former CEO of The Co-operative Group. He ceased to be a director in August 2017.
