= Owen Owen Building, Coventry =

Owen Owen Building
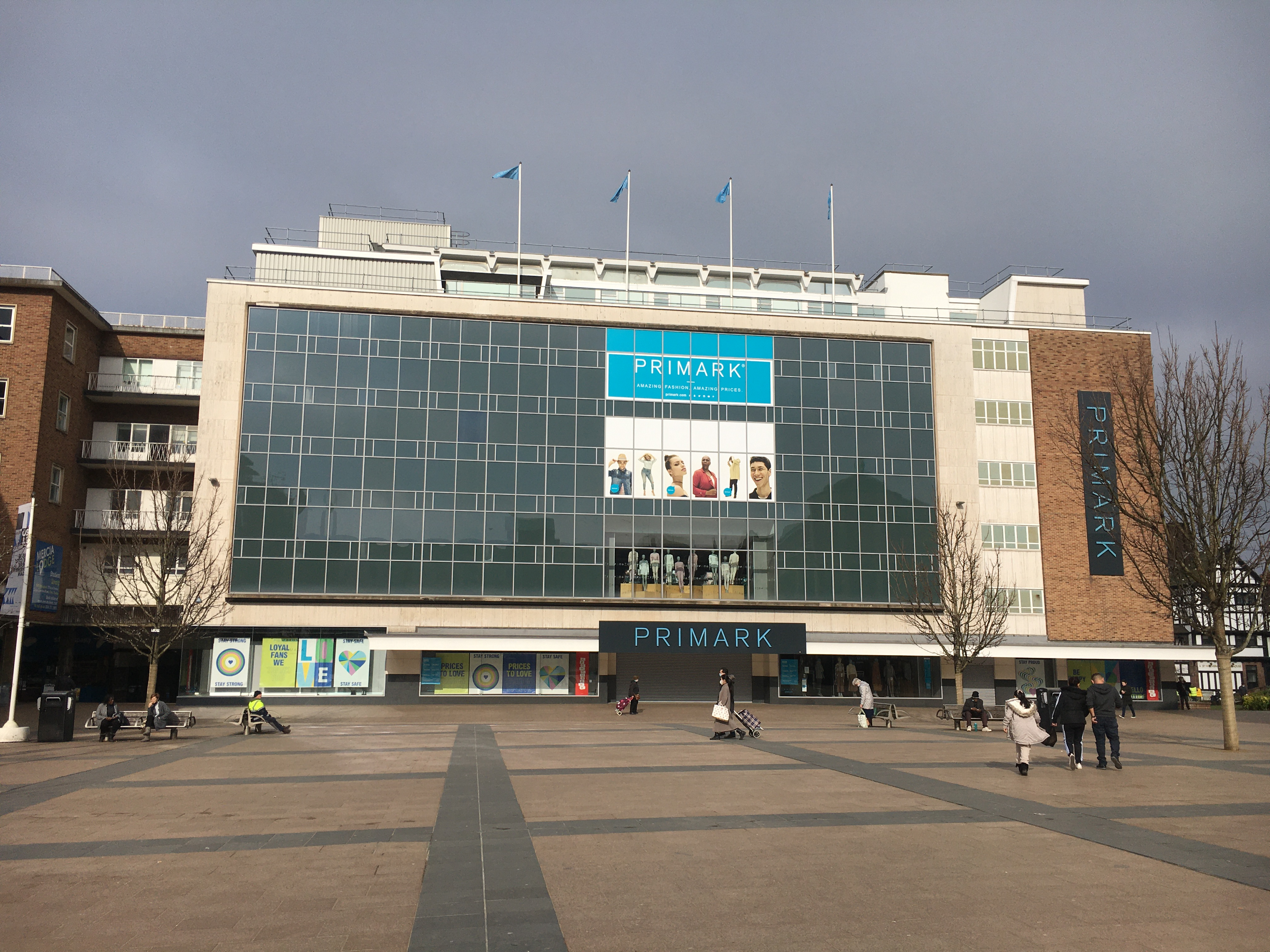
- South elevation of the Owen Owen Building
- Interactive map of the Owen Owen Building area
- Alternative names: Coventry Primark

General information
- Type: Retail
- Architectural style: Modernist
- Location: Broadgate, Coventry, England
- Coordinates: 52.40873°N 1.51036°W
- Current tenants: Primark
- Completed: 1954
- Opened: 1 October 1954

Design and construction
- Architecture firm: Hellberg and Harris
- Developer: Bovis Ltd

The Owen Owen Building is a large retail building in Coventry's Broadgate shopping precinct. It is named for the company that originally owned it, Owen Owen Ltd, it is currently occupied by Primark.

== History ==
Owen Owen was a chain of department stores based in Liverpool that opened its first store in Coventry in 1937 on the corner of Trinity Street and The Burges. The original Owen Owen building remained open until it was struck by an incendiary bomb in the Coventry Blitz on 14 November 1940. This left it scorched and roofless like the nearby cathedral, so the company moved to temporary premises in Trinity Street and Hales Street. It was announced in 1942 that the original building was to be demolished as it was damaged beyond repair.

The construction of Owen Owen's new store at the end of Broadgate began in 1951 along with other reconstruction projects in the city centre. The building was designed by Rolf Hellberg, a local architect, and built by Bovis between 1951 and 1954. The new building was opened to great excitement on 1 October 1954 by Alderman John Fennell, the second Lord Mayor of Coventry. The store attracted about three thousand people on the opening day, some arriving at four in the morning to secure their place in the queue. The Lord Mayor described the opening as "another landmark in the history of the reconstruction of our city centre" before cutting the ceremonial ribbon. The new store employed four hundred people spread over one hundred departments and continued to draw in customers for decades.

The Owen family sold their department store business in the 1980s, and it was eventually bought by Sir Philip Green in 1994. Under Green the Coventry store was sold to Allders in 1996, which occupied the building until it fell into administration in 2005. The Coventry store was among twenty-four arranged to be sold to Primark by the administrators, Kroll. The sale went through and Primark closed the store for refitting in March 2005. The newly refitted shop eventually reopened in 2006 after a series of delays, including asbestos having to be removed from the building. Primark has occupied the site from 2006 to the present day.

== Design ==
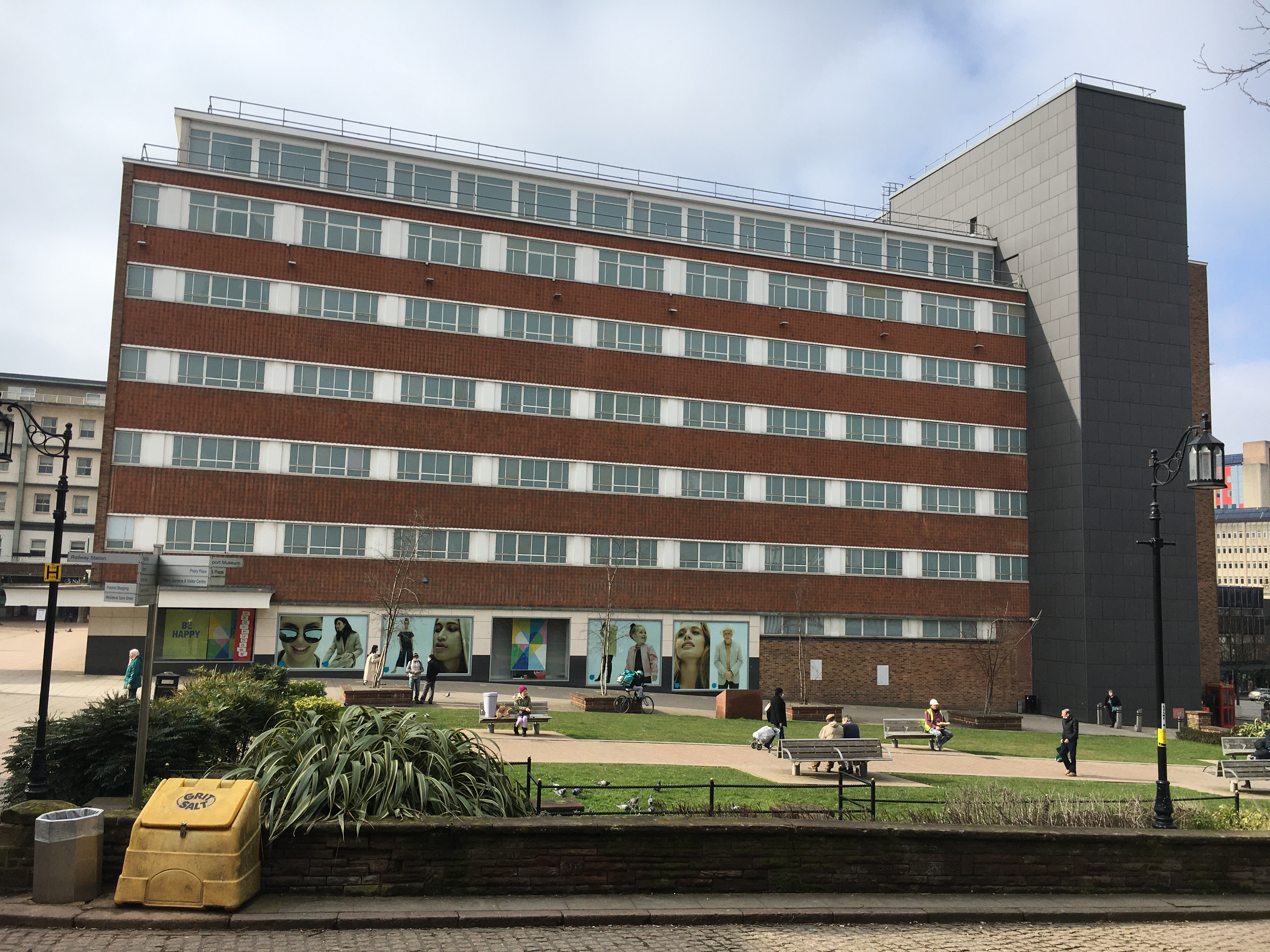
The east elevation, showing bold bands of brickwork and glass

The architectural theme around which most buildings in Coventry's post-war shopping precinct were based was set in 1948 by Donald Gibson's design for Broadgate House. It is a brick-clad building with regularly spaced windows edged with white stone, and an arcade at street level supported by stone-clad columns. The brick chosen is a similar colour to the local red-grey sandstone, allowing the new buildings to sit less jarringly next to the old. Hotel Leofric and the buildings in the Upper Precinct all follow this general pattern with small variations. The Owen Owen Building departed from this theme, its concrete mushroom column construction allowing the creation of a five storey glazed curtain wall facing out onto Broadgate.

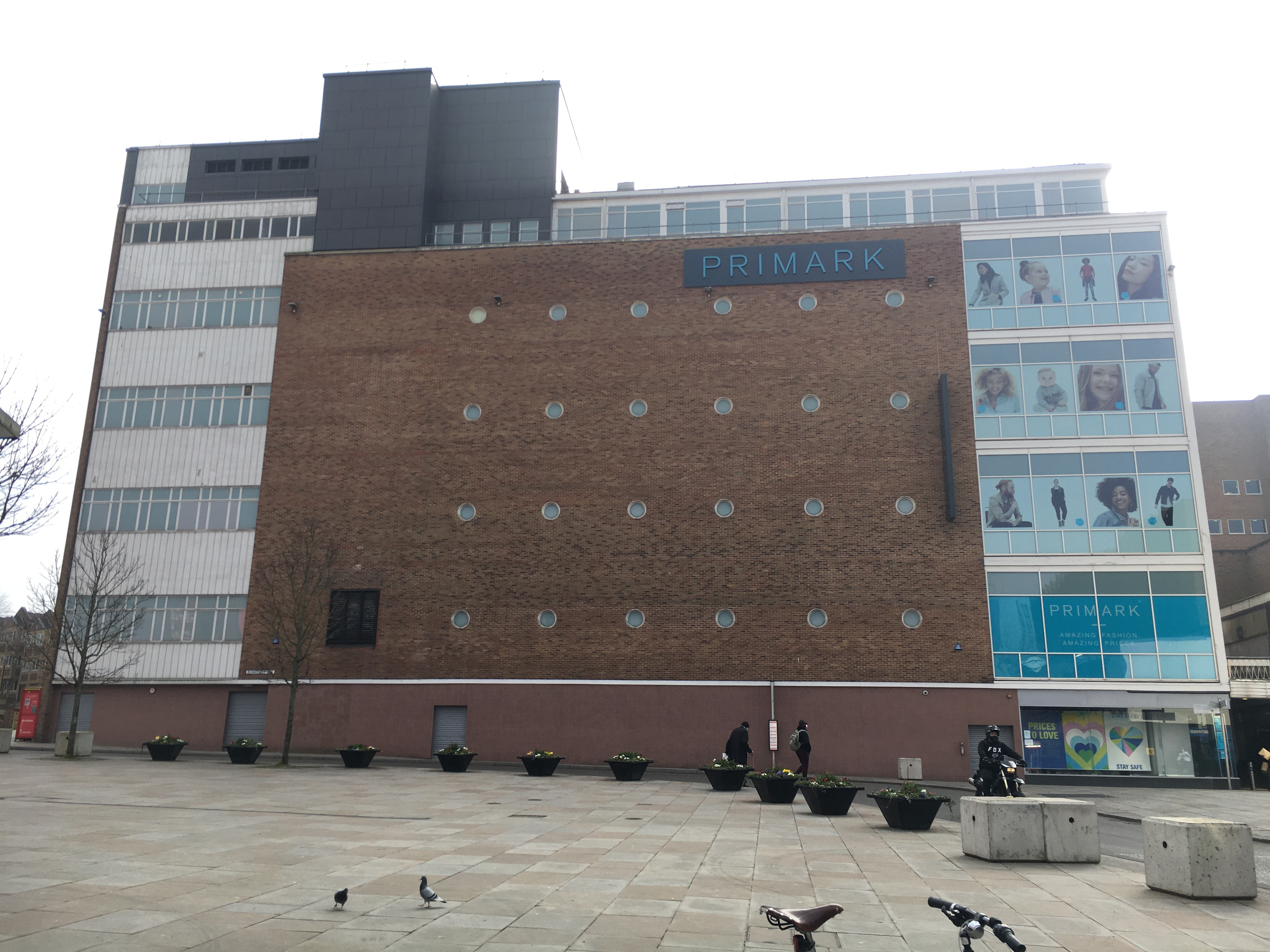
The north elevation, with its grid of portholes

In a talk to the Coventry Junior Chamber of Commerce in 1954 Rolf Hellberg, the architect, stated that the building had been designed with "attraction, appraisal and atmosphere" in mind. It had taken a "team of experts", he said, to plan the "immensely complex building". The curtain wall was intensely gridded with window boxes, later altered and simplified in the Primark refit. The ground floor was continuously glazed, revealing the structure of the building and a large sales area. From the east, the facade bears horizontal bands of windows and brick, terminating in the grey concrete panelling of the lift shaft. The north elevation is predominantly brick, perforated with a grid of round portholes. On the roof there is a glass fronted restaurant (now closed) and a row of flagpoles.

== See also ==
- Coventry Central Baths - a similarly ambitious building designed in the same period
