= James Colmer =

Former department store group

James Colmer was a small group of English department stores based in the West Country with its flagship store located on Union Street, Bath, Somerset.

== History ==
James Butler Colmer was born in Devon in c.1831 and went on to learn the drapery trade in London before establishing his own business in Bath. He married Frances Charlotte Jarvis in 1853 and they had five children. Frances died in 1862. James went on to marry Lydia Gumbleton, his neighbour, the following year and together they had a further seven children. They moved from Hampstead to the west country where James took over a struggling drapery and furnishing business based on Union Street in Bath.

James Colmer, established in 1870, became a successful business. The initial trade of drapery and furnishings was soon expanded into additional premises for the sale of fancy goods, turnery and toys. Colmer's store became one of the most significant in Bath alongside the leading competitors of Jolly & Son and Evans & Owen. James Butler Colmer died in 1897. His son James Henry Colmer took over the business, becoming managing director.

In 1914 a new shop front was added which united the Union Street premises for the first time. In 1920 James Henry Colmer became Mayor of Bath. The store was completely refurbished and further extended during the 1930s. During the Second World War the store received only shrapnel damage.

After the war the business grew with the purchase of existing department stores in Bristol (formerly W Morgan), Weston-Super-Mare (formerly B T Butter), Taunton (formerly Clements & Brown) and West Penwith (formerly Morgans) while the Bath store was extended again with the addition of two new selling floors. In 1954, the business leased land at Bath Recreation Ground to build a pavilion for use as a tennis club, however later that year the company sold the freehold to the Bath store for £310,000 on a leaseback scheme, so they could return capital back to shareholders and fight off a threat of a take-over. The company reported profits of £31,982 in 1955. The company opened a supermarket in Union Street, Bath.

In 1973 the business was purchased by the Liverpool-based Owen Owen department store group, after a battle with fellow department store group Hide & Co, through its parent company English Calico. The James Colmer name was replaced with that of the parent company. The Union Street building was listed at Grade II in 1975.
