= Edward Bates (department store) =

Former department store in Kent

Edward Bates was a department store located in Chatham, Kent with a subsidiary Blake & Co based in Maidstone.

== History ==
In 1869, Edward Bates opened a drapery shop in partnership with a Mr Paine at the age of 18. By 1871, the partnership was dissolved, and by 1877, the business had grown to four shops. However, in 1896, at the age of 45, Edward had died, leaving his son Edward II in charge of the business at the age of 24.

In 1900, the business moved from the four separate shops to one location at 94-96 High Street, Chatham. Edward II was a campaigner for better working conditions for employees and was co-founder of the Chatham Tradesman Association (now Medway Chambers of Commerce).

The business was incorporated in 1921, and a year later, Edward III, son of Edward II, joined the business, eventually taking over as Managing Director, a position he held until 1966 when his son Edward IV took over the position. In 1963, the store again moved to new premises at 125 High Street, Chatham, and in 1966, the store became members of the Associated Department Stores group. The business expanded again in 1969 by buying a department store in Maidstone called Blake & Son.

The business continued to operate until the late 1970s when Blake & Son was closed in 1978, and Edward Bates was sold to Bentalls department store group in 1979. The store was rebranded as Bentalls.
