= Esslemont & Macintosh =

Former department store in Aberdeen

Esslemont & Macintosh was a department store located in Aberdeen, Scotland.

== History ==
Peter Esslemont and William Macintosh were rivals in Aberdeen's burgeoning retail trade in the 19th century, but decided to join forces and set up a department store in 1873. The store was located on Broad Street and had a grand opening sale when its doors opened on 3 February.

The business opened with a capital of £3000 and continued to be run by both Esslemont and Macintosh until William's death in 1913. The store moved from its Broad Street location to Union Street in the 1920s.

In 1997, Norman Esslemont, the managing director and great-grandson of the founder Peter, left the firm after a family split on where the business was going. In 2005 the store was sold to department store chain Owen Owen, who had promised investment. However, in May 2007 the store was closed after Owen Owen went into administration in February 2007.
