= Fenwick (department store) =

British department store chain

Coordinates: 54.97495°N 1.61283°W

Fenwick, Limited

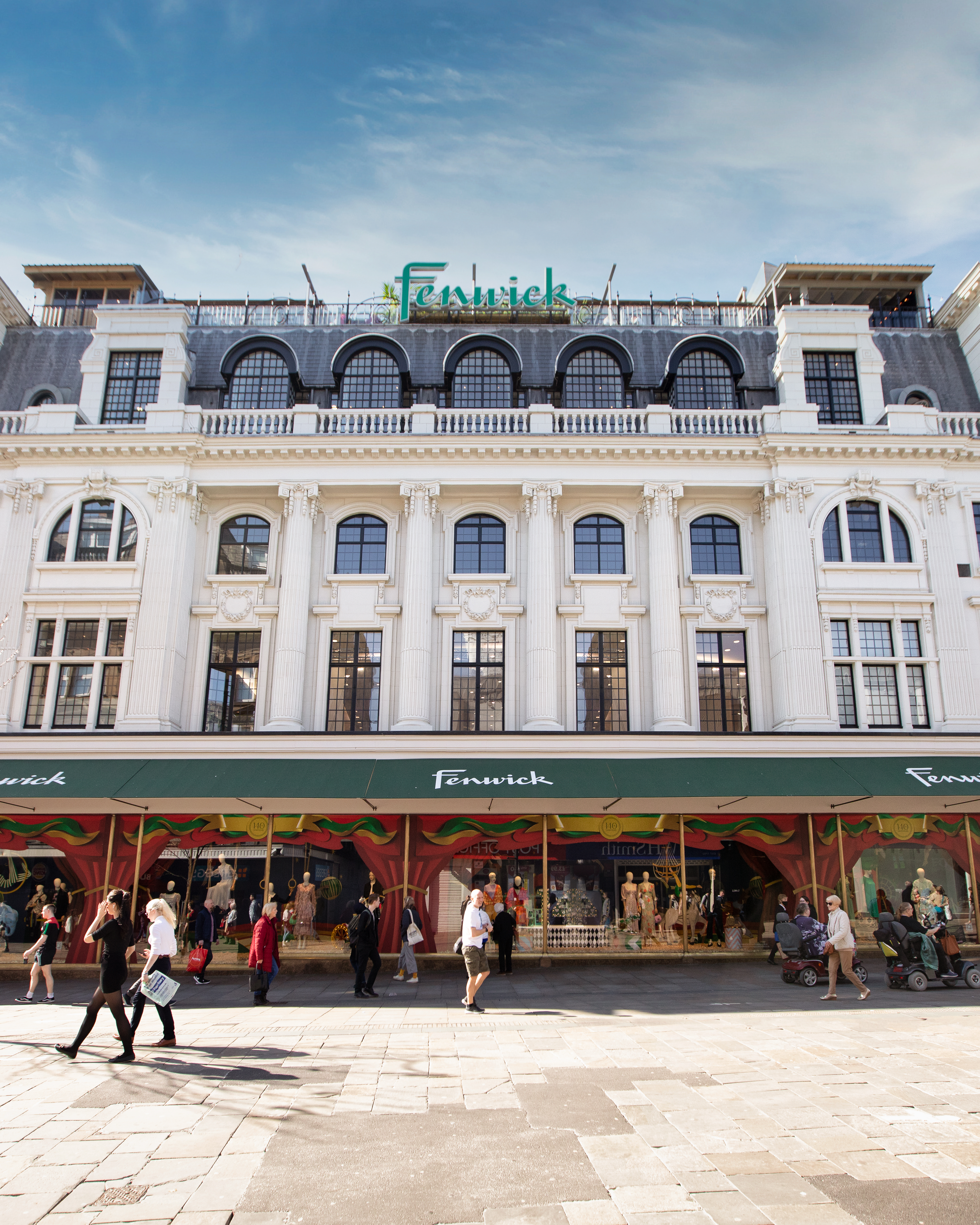
- Type: Private company
- Industry: Retail
- Genre: Department store
- Founded: 1882; 144 years ago
- Founder: John James Fenwick
- Headquarters: Newcastle upon Tyne, United Kingdom
- Number of locations: 8
- Key people: John Edgar (Chief Executive)
- Owner: Fenwick Family
- Website: fenwick.co.uk

Fenwick, Limited (/ˈfɛnɪk/) is a British chain of department stores in the United Kingdom. It was founded in 1882 by John James Fenwick in Newcastle upon Tyne, and has eight branches and an online store. It was a member of the International Association of Department Stores from 1988 to 2010.

As of 2022, the chain is still owned by members of the Fenwick family. The company was chaired by Mark Fenwick until 2017 with Simon Calver appointed as chair in 2021. John Edgar was appointed as CEO of Fenwick in April 2020. In 2012, the Newcastle Chronicle reported that the company was valued at £452 million.

== History ==
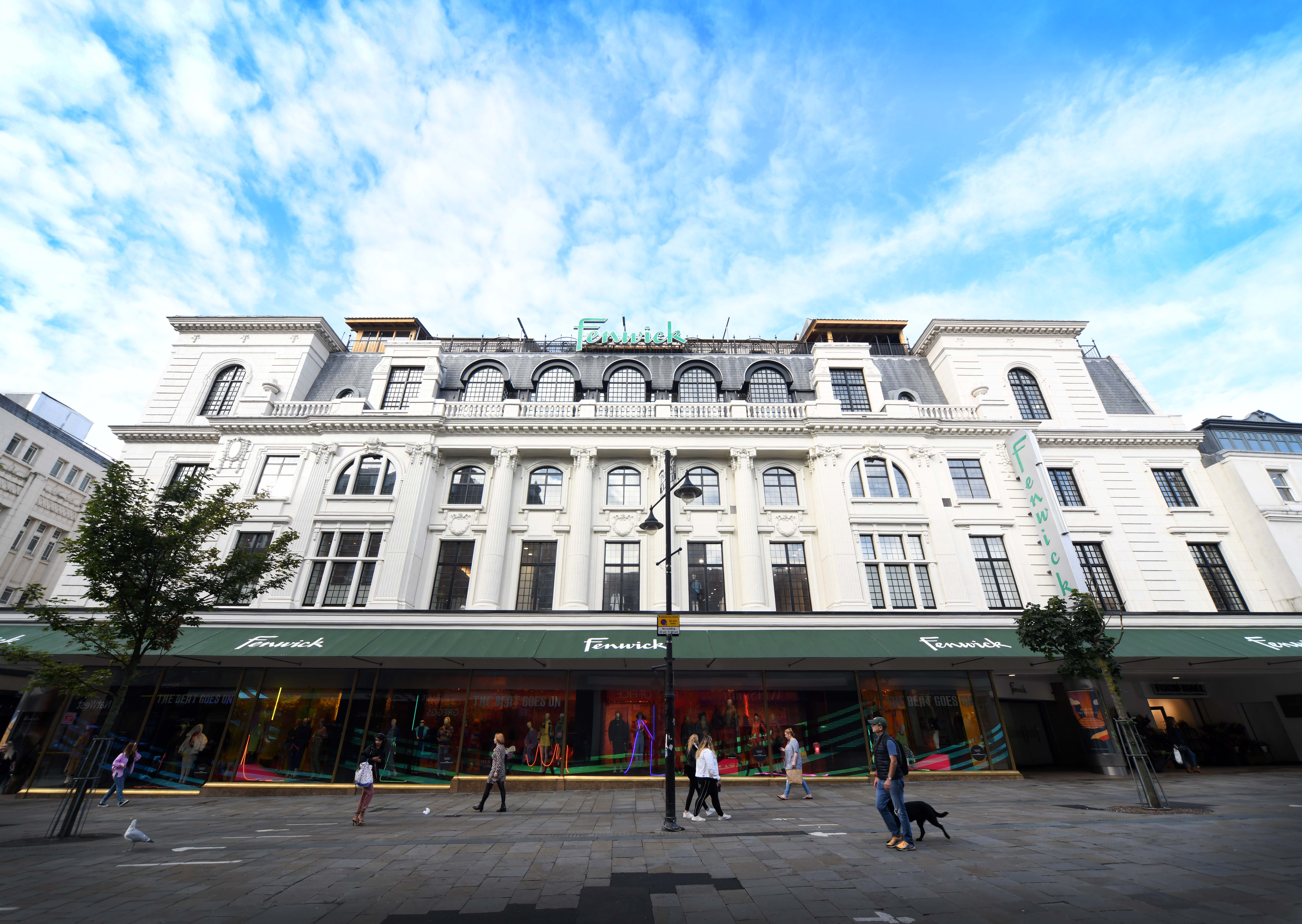
Flagship Fenwick store in Newcastle

Fenwick's began as a Mantle Maker and Furrier, founded in 1882 by John James Fenwick. Born in Richmond, North Yorkshire in 1846, Fenwick had been a shop assistant in his father's grocer's shop, and an apprentice draper, but in 1881 or 1882 he opened his own shop in Newcastle. Initially the shop's premises were a former doctor's house at 5 Northumberland Street, purchased for £181 and 4 shillings. (Note: 181 pounds, 4 shillings, and 0 pence. For more information on "old-style" British currency notation, see £sd#Writing conventions and pronunciations.) The shop sold fabrics, silk, clothes and trimmings. The business soon expanded into numbers 37, 38 and 40 Northumberland Street, and this remains the chain's flagship store. John's eldest son Fred Fenwick joined the business in 1890. Fred had trained in retail in Paris and is said to have been inspired by Le Bon Marché, which is regarded as one of the first ever department stores.

Fenwick has since expanded its operations. In 1888, it opened a store in Sunderland, but it closed within the year. In 1891, it opened a branch in Bond Street, London. The first fashion store on the street, it later doubled in size in 1980.

The company bought the Joseph Johnson store in Leicester in 1962, which was subsequently rebranded as Fenwick. Fenwick was an anchor department store for the 1976 opening of Brent Cross Shopping Centre in London, which was the first large out-of-town shopping centre in the UK. A further store was opened in Oxford on the site of the F Cape & Co department store in 1978.

Outlets in Windsor and York followed in 1980 and 1984 respectively, with a limited range of departments, specialising in clothing, fashion accessories and cosmetics. The Ricemans store in Canterbury was acquired in 1986, and rebranded Fenwick in 2003. The Tunbridge Wells store opened in 1992 as part of the Royal Victoria Place development.

=== 21st century ===
In 2001, Fenwick acquired the Bentalls group of department stores for £70.8 million, with stores in Kingston upon Thames, Worthing, Ealing, Bracknell, Tonbridge and Lakeside. The Lakeside store was closed, and three branches (Worthing, Ealing and Tonbridge) were subsequently sold to J E Beale, with Fenwick retaining only the stores in Kingston upon Thames and Bracknell. The Bentalls name was retained at the Kingston store until 2023, when it was rebranded as Fenwicks.

In 2007, Fenwick purchased Williams & Griffin, an independent department store in Colchester, Essex; this continued to trade under the Williams & Griffin name until a 2016 refurbishment, after which it adopted the Fenwick identity.

On 5 January 2017, Mark Fenwick announced that the historic Leicester store was to close. The store closed in March 2017.

In April 2017, Fenwick announced plans to close their Windsor store. The store closed in August 2017.

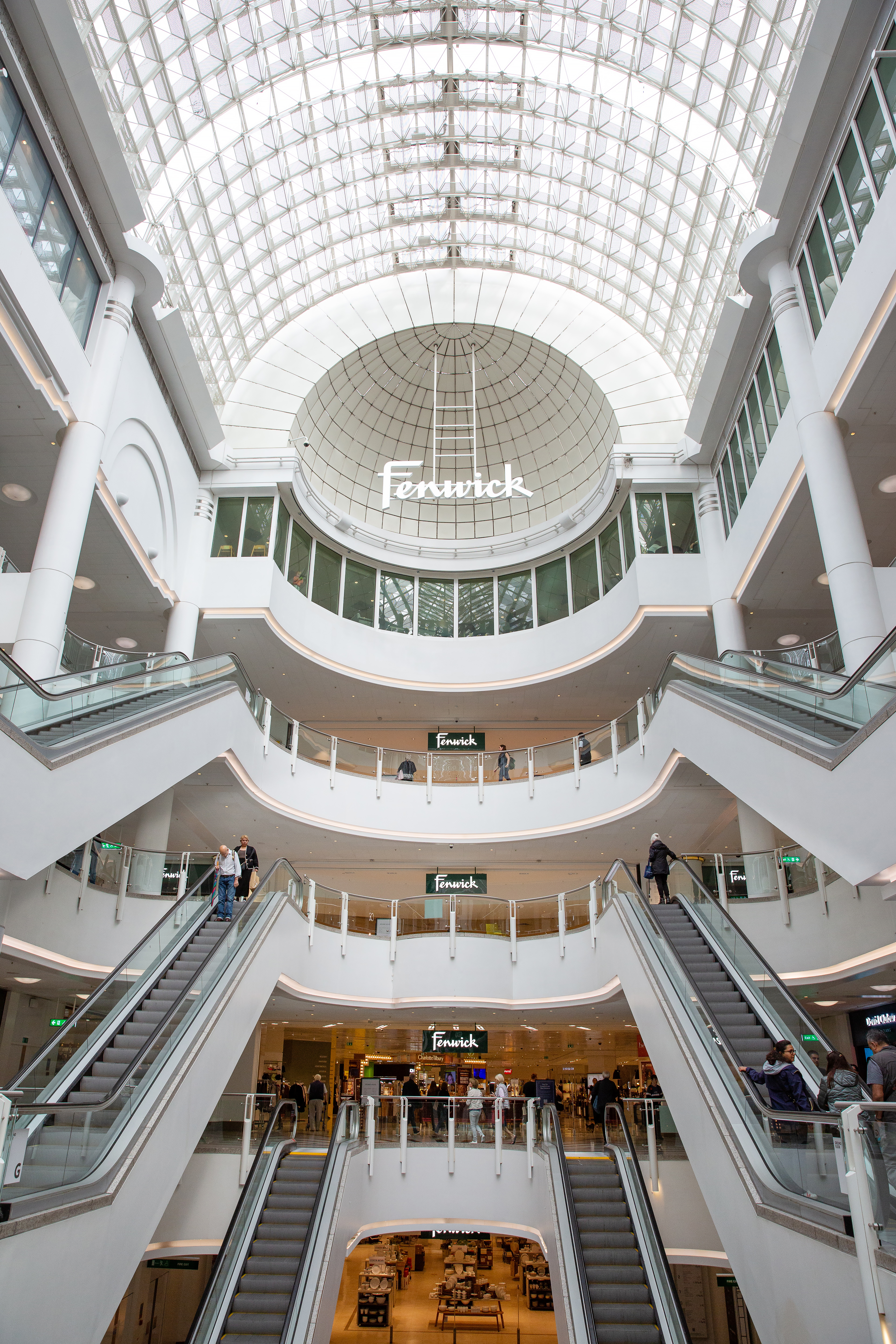
Fenwick Kingston

The last two remaining members of the Fenwick family on the company's board stepped down in October 2017.

Bentalls in Bracknell closed in 2017 with the opening of a new Fenwick store in The Lexicon Shopping Centre, located in the same town.

Fenwick launches Fenwick Food, the re-launch of its own-label ventures, followed by Fenwick at Home, its inaugural homeware range, in 2021.

On 6 December 2022 it was announced that the Bond Street store would close in 2024, after 133 years, having sold the store and adjoining property to Lazari Investments for an undisclosed sum. In a statement, the company said: "Amid the turbulent economic environment, fresh capital investment is required in order to return the business to profitable growth."

In September 2025, the chain launched a loyalty programme called MyFenwick. This allows for customers who shop in-store or online to collect points on their purchases, as well as other incentives.

== Current operations ==
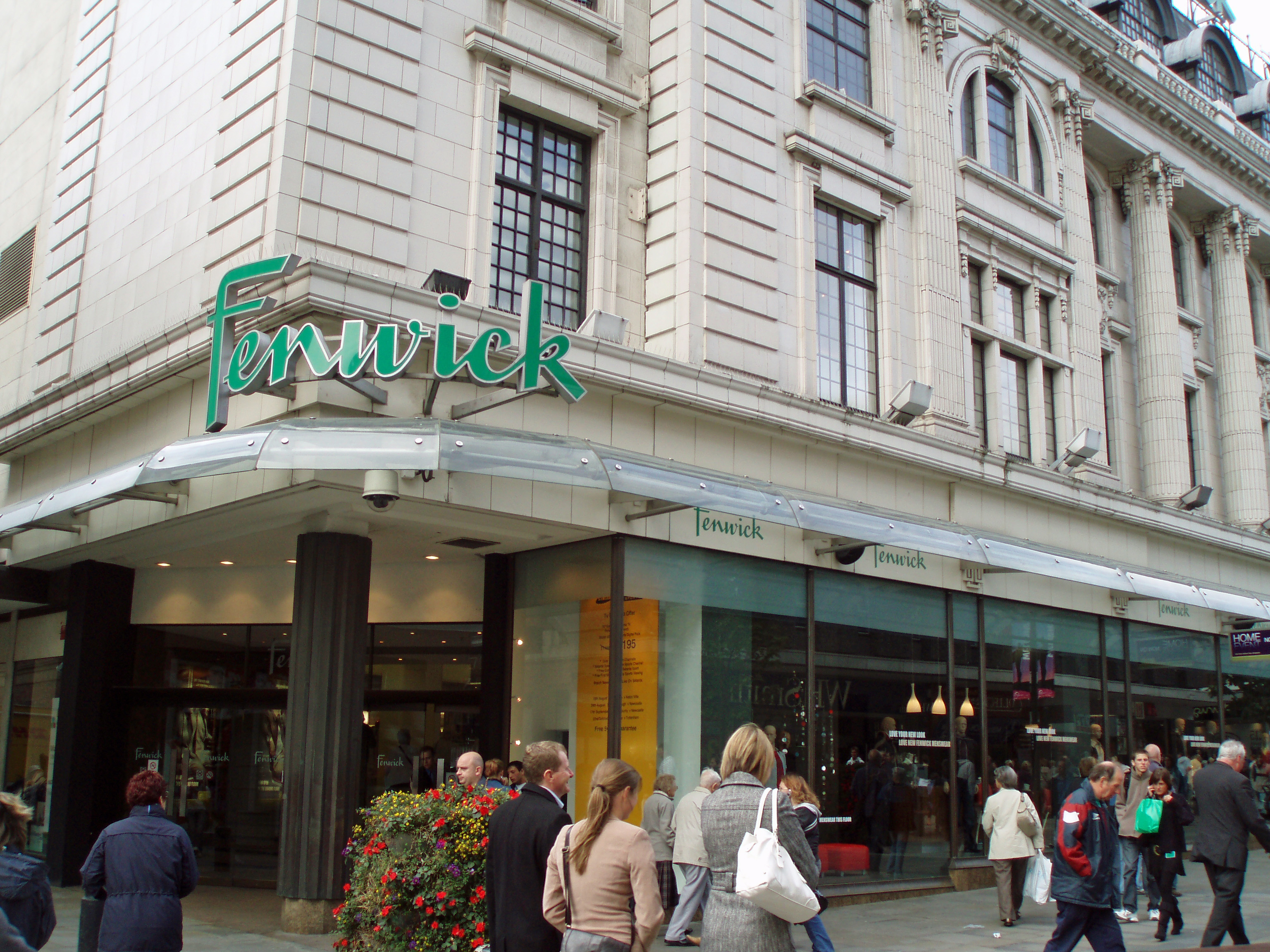
Fenwick Newcastle Northumberland Street entrance.

Fenwick has its headquarters at the original Fenwick department store in the centre of Newcastle upon Tyne. The company operates eight outlets across England (January 2024): Newcastle upon Tyne, Bracknell, Brent Cross Shopping Centre in London, Canterbury, Colchester, Kingston upon Thames, Royal Tunbridge Wells and York as well as online.

In 2022, the Bond Street store was put up for sale at £500 million, listed as a 'redevelopment opportunity' after the COVID-19 pandemic foiled plans for the Fenwick family to sell the chain entirely. The store closed in February 2024.

The London Head Office is now located on 103 Wigmore Street, 2nd Floor, W1U 1QS.

=== Fenwick Newcastle ===
The original and flagship store in the group occupies a large site in the centre of Newcastle upon Tyne. The store has expanded many times since its foundation in 1882 and now consists of several interconnected buildings with entrances onto Northumberland Street, Eldon Square, Monument Metro Station and Blackett Street.

Fenwick offers a wide range of goods and services with a focus on premium and luxury products. It is one of few department stores in the UK to retain a food hall. This was refurbished in 2015.

The store is known locally for its extravagant Christmas window displays, filled with detailed sets and sophisticated moving figures, which have appeared since 1971.

In 2022, Fenwick announced an investment of £40 million over the next five years in the refurbishment of its Newcastle, flagship, adding two new atria and renovating the beauty hall and accessories area.

In July 2026, Fenwick partnered with Savour Bakery, an artisan bakery and patisserie based in neighbouring Gateshead. Under the agreement, Savour established a dedicated presence at the Newcastle store, bringing its selection of pastries to the department store.

== See also ==
- List of department stores of the United Kingdom
