= Beales (department store) =

English department store chain

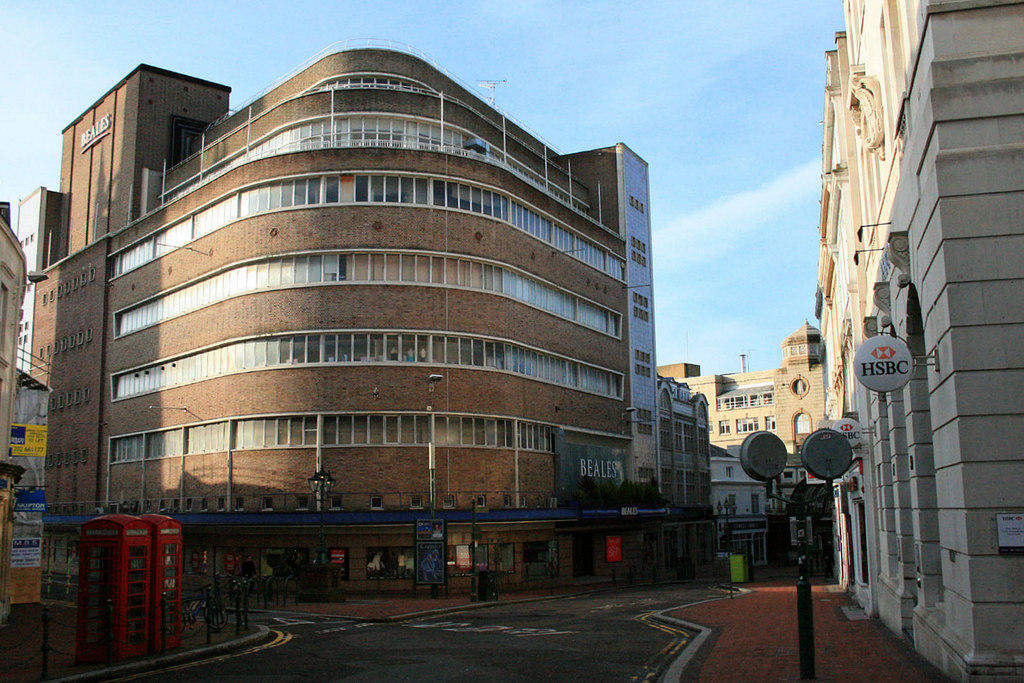
- Beales, Bournemouth
- Company type: Limited company
- Industry: Retail
- Genre: Department store
- Founded: 1881; 145 years ago in Bournemouth, Hampshire, UK
- Founder: John Elmes Beale
- Defunct: June 1 2025
- Fate: Administration
- Headquarters: Hertfordshire, United Kingdom
- Area served: UK
- Key people: Andrew Perloff (Chairman); Tony Brown
- Number of employees: 1000 (2020)
- Parent: Panther Securities

Beales was an English department store chain. The former flagship store, Beales in Bournemouth, was established as The Fancy Fair by John Elmes Beale in 1881 and was the biggest department store in Dorset. The chain expanded through acquiring other department stores and continued to run two stores branded as Palmers in Great Yarmouth and Lowestoft until its closure.

The company was listed on the London Stock Exchange until its private equity takeover. Beales entered administration on 20 January 2020 and finally closed their remaining stores on 18 March 2020. It formerly operated 23 branches before entering administration. However, a new company, New Start 2020 Limited, reopened the Beales store in Poole in August 2020. The new Beales company closed its doors for the final time at the end of May 2025.

== History ==
Beales was established in 1881 by John Elmes Beale when he opened a store, initially known as a Fancy Fair and Oriental House, on Old Christchurch Road in Bournemouth. The company was run by the Beale family during the 20th century; Bennett Beale took over from his father, then by his John's grandson Frank. Frank Beale trained at Macy's in New York City before returning to lead the company. In the 1980s Nigel Beale, grandson of the company's founder, led the company.

Beales claimed to be the first department store in the world to feature a live Father Christmas character, dating back to 1885. During the Second World War the company's Bournemouth store was bombed on 23 May 1943.

The company floated on the London Stock Exchange in 1995. Whitakers, the Bolton department store opened in 1829 was bought by Beales in 1996, with the name changed to Beales in 2011.

=== Early 21st-century expansion ===
The group acquired the Bentalls department stores in Ealing (closed October 2007), Tonbridge and Worthing from Fenwick in 2002 and closed its Walton-on-Thames store in January 2006.

A new Beales store opened in Horsham in September 2006 in premises formerly occupied by Allders. On 4 June 2010, Beales acquired the Robbs department store in Hexham from Vergo Retail which was in administration, for £250,000. In August 2010, Beales expanded further by acquiring the Westgate Department Store in Rochdale from the Anglia Regional Co-operative Society.

As of 5 April 2011, Beales acquired 19 additional Westgate stores, securing its long-term future. In May 2012, Beales announced it would be opening an outlet store in the former T.J. Hughes store in The Mall Maidstone. This store closed in June 2013. In addition a branch in Skipton closed in November 2012, a branch in Cinderford closed in July 2013.

In summer 2014, the large Harrogate store closed for re-development of the land by the landlord. In June 2016, a planning application submitted by AEW UK for 76 flats in Bournemouth's Beales store was unanimously rejected after a campaign by locals and the owners of Beales backed by Conor Burns MP. The 65 studio and 11 one bedroom flats with no parking which were described by AEW UK as "an environmentally sustainable approach" which "made the best use of the building" were rejected by councillors as "shabby" and "appalling".

On 28 November 2018, Beales bought Palmers. Tony Brown took the company into private ownership in 2018. Beales was a member of Associated Independent Stores (a buying group) which enabled Beales to benefit from the cost savings of buying textiles and other non-food goods in bulk.

=== 2020 closure and reopening ===
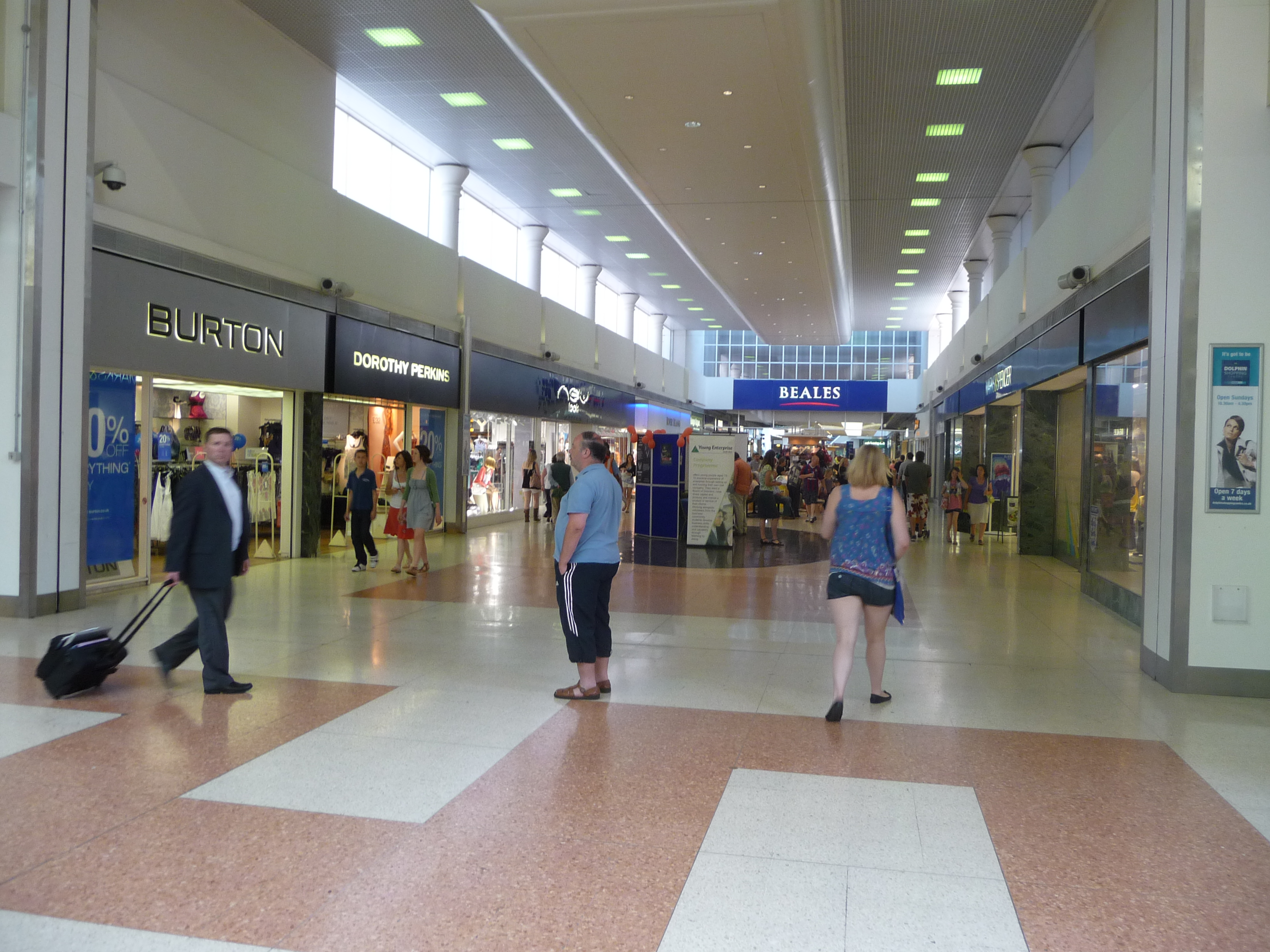
The Dolphin Shopping Centre, Poole. Beales' store can be seen in the background.

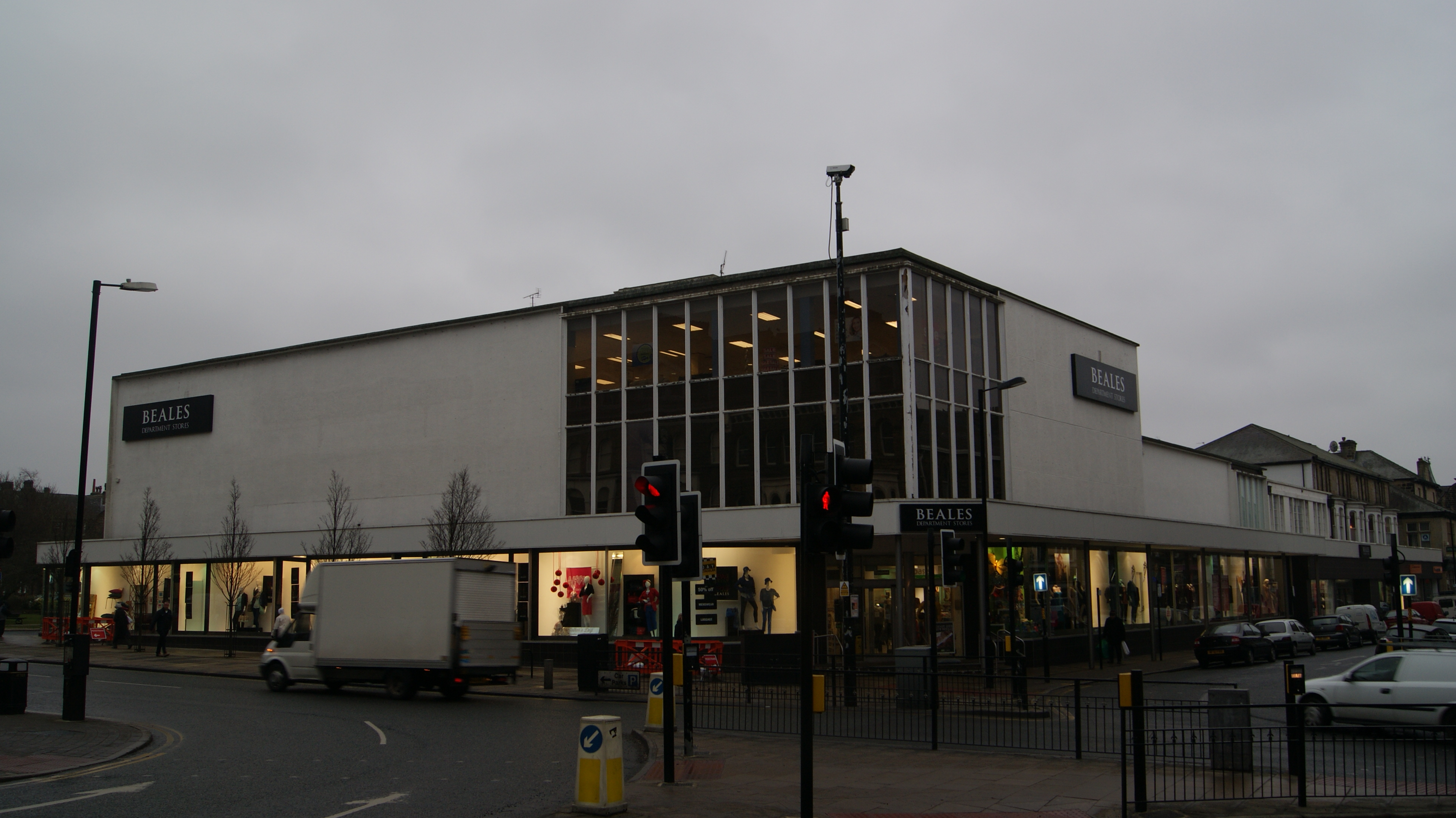
Beales in Harrogate in 2013. This branch closed in 2014 and was demolished in 2015.

On 12 January 2020, Beales warned that the company with 23 stores in the UK could collapse into administration, if a buyer for the business could not be found.

On 20 January 2020, Beales formally entered administration, appointing KPMG as the administrators. It was understood that there would be no immediate store closures and Beales stores would continue to trade as normal in the short term. On the same date, the beales.co.uk customer-facing website also went offline. At the time of entering administration, Beales had 23 stores and employed in excess of 1,000 people whose jobs were at risk.

On 7 February 2020, it was announced that Beales was closing 12 stores, due to failure to sell the chain as a whole. This included Beales’ flagship store and many other significant locations. On 18 February it was announced that, although negotiations with a number of parties were continuing, the remaining 11 stores would close within the following 8 weeks selling their remaining stock.

The COVID-19 pandemic hastened the closure of the remaining Beales stores, with the last stores closing on 18 March and the website going offline shortly afterwards. Beales owed £12.6million, and during a month of closing down sales took £9.6 million in revenue.

However, a new company, New Start 2020 Limited, owned by Panther Securities reopened a Beales store in Poole in August 2020. Panther Securities' chairman Andrew Perloff owned Beales for three years previously. The new company hired Beales' former CEO Tony Brown to run the Poole project. Further store reopenings followed at Peterborough in May 2021 and Southport in August of that year.

University Hospitals Dorset NHS Foundation Trust set up a new 'health village' on the second floor of the Beales department store in Poole, in 2022, using material and equipment from decommissioned Nightingale hospitals. This 20,000 sq ft clinic will cover ophthalmology, dermatology, breast screening, and musco-skeletal services.

After closing the Peterborough and Southport stores, Beales announced in February 2025 that its final remaining branch in Poole would close by the end of May 2025. Tony Brown, Beale's chief executive, said that the Labour government's increases to employer's National Insurance contribution meant that Beales had become 'unviable', adding £200,000 to the firm's costs.

On 14 May 2025, Kemi Badenoch, the Conservative Party leader, used Beales as an example of the failure of the Labour Government. She said that Beales 'could not survive this Labour government' and were having a 'Rachel Reeves closing down sale'.

== Locations ==
=== Former locations ===
- Abingdon (formerly Westgate Contact Electrical and Comfortmaker; acquired May 2011, closed 8 January 2017)
- Beccles (formerly Westgate; acquired May 2011, closed 18 March 2020)
- Bedford (formerly E Braggins & Son; acquired 1982, closed March 2020)
- Bishop Auckland (formerly Westgate; acquired May 2011, closed January 2017)
- Blandford Forum, Cherretts (funeral services; sold 1990)
- Bolton (formerly Whitakers; acquired March 1996, closed 31 December 2016)
- Bournemouth (opened 1881 as The Fancy Fair; closed 2020)
- Bournemouth, Bealesons (formerly Okeys; closed 1982; site since occupied by The Avenue Shopping Centre)
- Chipping Norton (formerly Westgate; acquired May 2011, closed 18 March 2020)
- Cinderford (formerly Westgate and originally 'County Store' of Gloucester and Severnside Co-operative Society; acquired May 2011, closed July 2013)
- Diss (formerly Westgate; acquired May 2011, closed 18 March 2020)
- Dorchester, Dash (franchise; closed 1992)
- Ealing (formerly Bentalls and originally Eldred Sayers & Son; acquired 2002, closed October 2007)
- Eastbourne (opened 1927; building sold in 1946 to Brighton Co-operative Society)
- Fareham (opened 2019 in premises previously occupied by Marks & Spencer, closed 18 March 2020)
- Fareham, Beales Boutique (originally Beales for Men; opened 2010, closed 2011)
- Great Yarmouth, Palmers (acquired 28 November 2018, closed 15 March 2020)
- Harrogate (formerly Westgate and originally Sunwin House; acquired May 2011, closed 2014; building demolished 2015)
- Hexham (formerly Robbs; acquired June 2010, closed 24 February 2020)
- Horsham (formerly Allders; acquired 2006, closed July 2016; building since occupied by Dunelm)
- Ilford, Wests
- Kendal (formerly J R Taylor and originally Musgroves; acquired 1999, closed 18 March 2020)
- Keighley, Beales Home Store (formerly Westgate, preceded by Sunwin House; acquired May 2011, closed August 2014)
- Keighley, Beales Fashion Store (formerly Westgate, preceded by Sunwin House; acquired May 2011, closed February 2020)
- King's Lynn (formerly Westgate; acquired May 2011, closed 2016)
- Lowestoft, Palmers (formerly Chadds; acquired 28 November 2018, closed 18 March 2020)
- Lowestoft (formerly Westgate; acquired May 2011, closed April 2019 when the town's nearby Palmers store became 'part of the Beales family of stores')
- Maidstone, Beales Outlet (The Mall Maidstone; formerly a branch of T J Hughes; opened June 2012, closed June 2013)
- Mansfield (formerly Westgate; acquired May 2011, closed February 2020)
- Minehead, Bealesons (formerly Floyds; acquired 1978, closed 1982)
- Nottingham, Tobys (sold 1982)
- Parkstone (home furnishings; formerly Mews; closed July 1993)
- Parkstone, Yeatmans (funeral services; sold 1990)
- Perth (formerly McEwens; acquired 2017, closed March 2020)
- Peterborough (formerly Westgate; acquired May 2011, closed 18 March 2020, reopened May 2021, closed January 2023)
- Poole (Dolphin Shopping Centre; originally opened 1969 as a Bealesons store, closed 18 March 2020, reopened 3 August 2020, closed 31 May 2025)
- Redcar (formerly Westgate; acquired May 2011)
- Rochdale (formerly Whitakers, preceded by Westgate and originally Sunwin House; acquired September 2010, closed August 2016)
- Saffron Walden (formerly Westgate, preceded by Eaden Lilley and originally Emson Tanner & Co.; acquired May 2011, closed December 2016)
- Salisbury, Dash (franchise; closed 1992)
- Skegness (formerly Westgate; acquired May 2011, closed 18 March 2020)
- Skipton (formerly Westgate, preceded by Sunwin House; acquired May 2011, closed November 2012)
- Southport (formerly Broadbents & Boothroyds and originally Boothroyds; acquired August 1993, closed 18 March 2020, reopened 12 August 2021, closed September 2024)
- Spalding (formerly Westgate; acquired May 2011)
- St Neots (formerly Westgate; acquired May 2011, closed 18 March 2020)
- Tonbridge (formerly Bentalls, acquired 2002)
- Walton-on-Thames (formerly Grant Warden and originally Campbell & Booker; acquired 1979, closed January 2006)
- Winchester (opened March 1991, closed August 2016)
- Wisbech (formerly Westgate, acquired May 2011)
- Worthing (formerly Bentalls and originally Bentall & Sons; acquired 2002)
- Yeovil (formerly Denners; acquired 1999, closed 18 March 2020)

== See also ==
- List of department stores of the United Kingdom
