= John Elmes Beale =

English politician and merchant

John Beale
- Born: John Elmes Beale; 6 December 1847; Hartford Terrace, Melcombe Regis, Dorset
- Died: 1 July 1928 (aged 80); Boscombe, Bournemouth, Hampshire
- Resting place: Wimborne Road Cemetery
- Citizenship: British
- Occupations: Politician; Merchant
- Years active: 1881–1928
- Organization: Beales
- Known for: Founder of Beales
- Title: Founder, CEO & Chairman
- Term: 1881–1928
- Predecessor: Founded
- Successor: See Beale Limited
- Board member of: Beale Limited
- Spouse: Sarah Ann Beale (died 1928)
- Children: 1

Chairman of Beales
- In office 1881–1928
- Preceded by: Founded
- Succeeded by: See Beales

Mayor of Bournemouth
- In office 1902–1905
- Preceded by: see Bournemouth
- Succeeded by: Alderman John Parsons
- Website: www.beales.co.uk

John Elmes Beale (6 December 1847 – 1 July 1928) was an English politician and merchant. He was Mayor of Bournemouth in 1902, 1903 and 1904. He founded Beales, Bournemouth's largest department store.

Born in Hartford Terrace, Melcombe Regis, Dorset, England, Beale was also a stalwart of the Richmond Hill Congregational Church to which his great friend, Mr. Okey, introduced him. Beale was largely responsible for securing the services of the Rev. J. D. Jones for the church, after a previous preacher left. He also took over Mr. Okey's draper's store in Commercial Road and turned it into Bealesons. Mr Okey gave up the business following the death of three of his four sons in World War I.

John Elmes Beale died at age 80 in Boscombe, Bournemouth, Hampshire. He and his wife, Sarah Ann Beale née Hussey Brickell, are buried in Wimborne Road Cemetery.
