= Robbs =

Former department store in Hexham

Robbs of Hexham
- Company type: Retail
- Industry: Retail
- Genre: Department Store
- Founded: 1818; 208 years ago
- Founder: William Robb
- Defunct: 2011; 15 years ago
- Headquarters: Hexham, England
- Number of employees: 140
- Parent: Beales
- Website: (parent company)

Robbs was a mid-size department store in Hexham, latterly owned by Beales. It was established in 1818 by William Robb a lace trader from Fife and subsequently managed for the next 169 years in an unbroken father to son line for six generations. The store was regularly expanded and developed over the years and at one time occupied 30% of the retail floorspace of Hexham. It has had a long and extravagant history boasting the first electric lights in the town, its own funeral directors service, an upholstery service, haberdashery and dressmaking.

At its peak, the store traded on 5 floors with 80,000 square feet of floor space including a food hall. Over 300 staff were employed in the store in the early 1980s. The store opened a second branch in Hexham in 1989. Robbs at Tynedale Park featured a garden centre, homewares and furnishings. It was later rebranded as Tynedale Park, before being sold to Tesco and closing in 2005.

The business was sold to the Joplings group in October 1987, and a few years later was acquired by Merchant Retail and Owen Owen, before it was bought by the newly formed Vergo Retail in 2007.

On 7 May 2010 Vergo was placed into administration, with MCR appointed as the administrators. On 11 May 2010 it was announced that there would be ten store closures, including Robbs, within the next four weeks unless a buyer was found. By 21 May 2010 Beales had lodged a formal notice of interest in Robbs of Hexham, whilst the administrators asked the Buccleuch Group, owners of the building, and Northumberland County Council to waive rent and rates for ten weeks, to allow the business to be continued to be marketed as a going concern. On 4 June 2010 Robbs was sold to Beales for £250,000, saving 140 jobs. Beales aimed to return the store to profitability. In 2011 the store was rebranded under the Beales fascia, and it closed in February 2020.
