= Big Dig (Liverpool) =

Liverpool regeneration projects

The Big Dig was a collection of various civil engineering projects in Liverpool to regenerate the city.

The scheme was a ten-year plan for the city's 2008 European Capital of Culture status. The city gained a new shopping centre Liverpool One. It cost around £3bn and created 14,000 jobs and included a rationalisation of the city centre traffic network.

== Criticism ==
Implementation of the scheme was protracted and severely hampered the ability of the city to perform as a commercial centre. The cancellation of the 2007 Mathew Street Festival was directly attributed to the 'big dig'.
