= Liverpool International Music Festival =

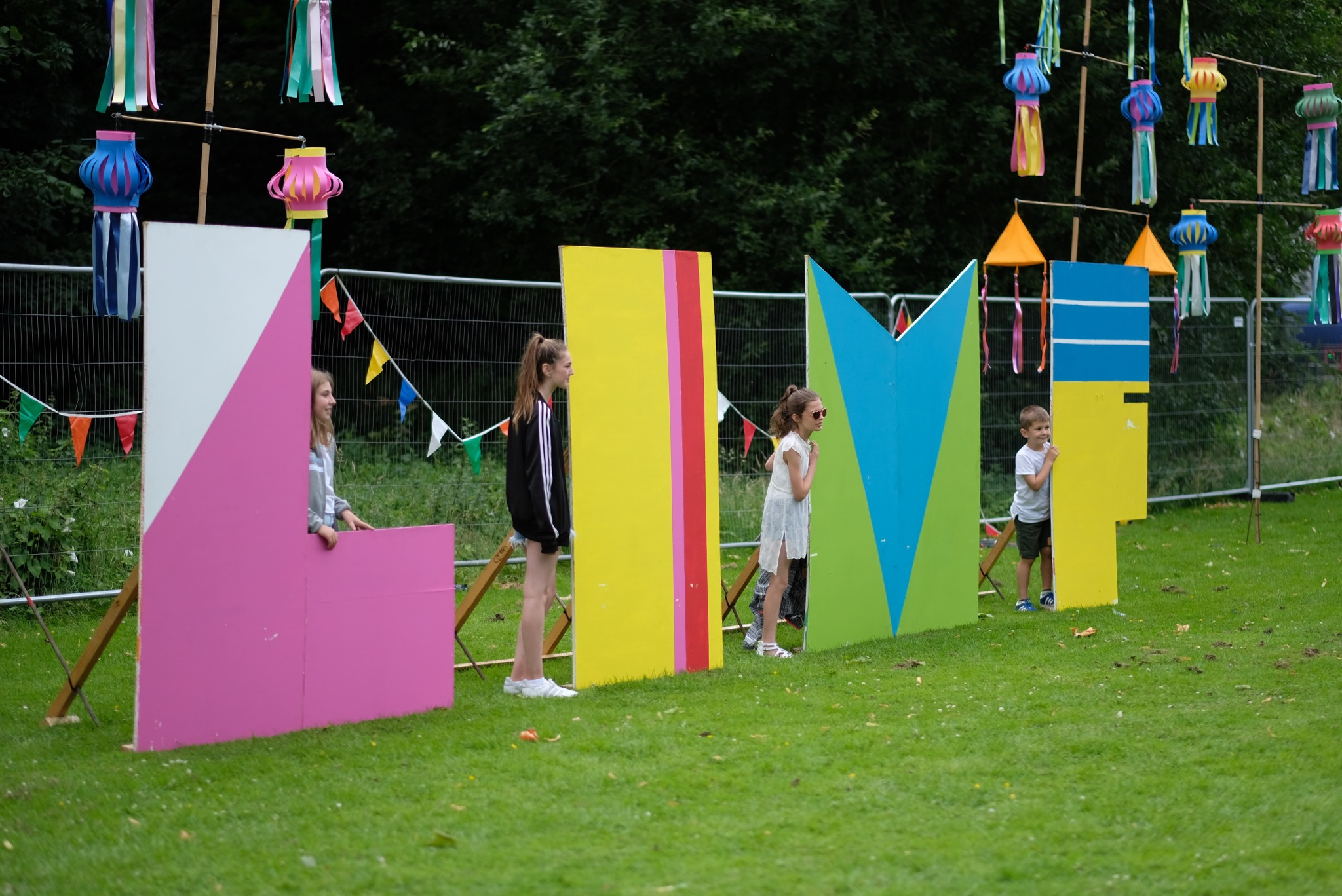
LIMF Family Zone

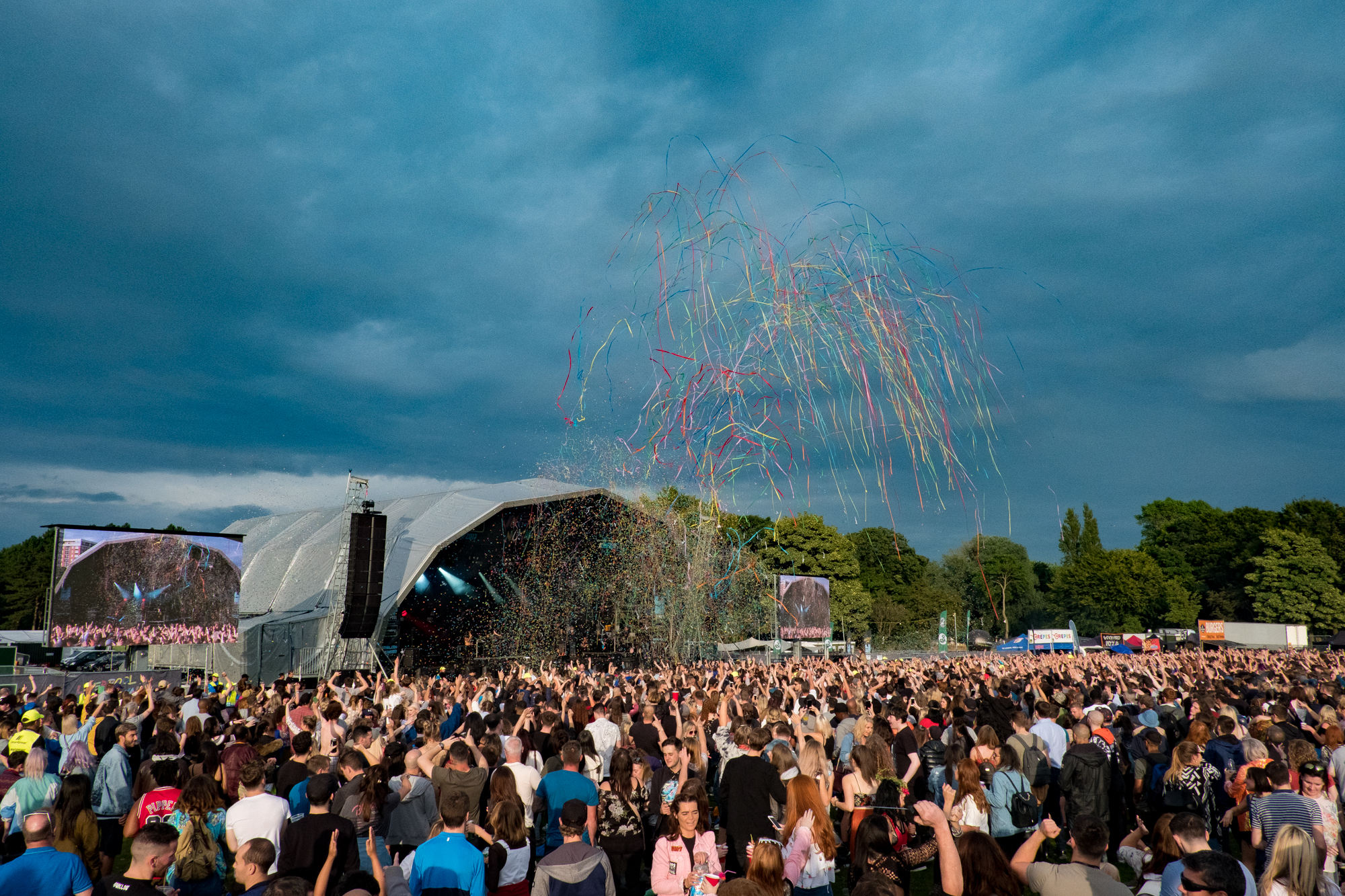
Central Stage

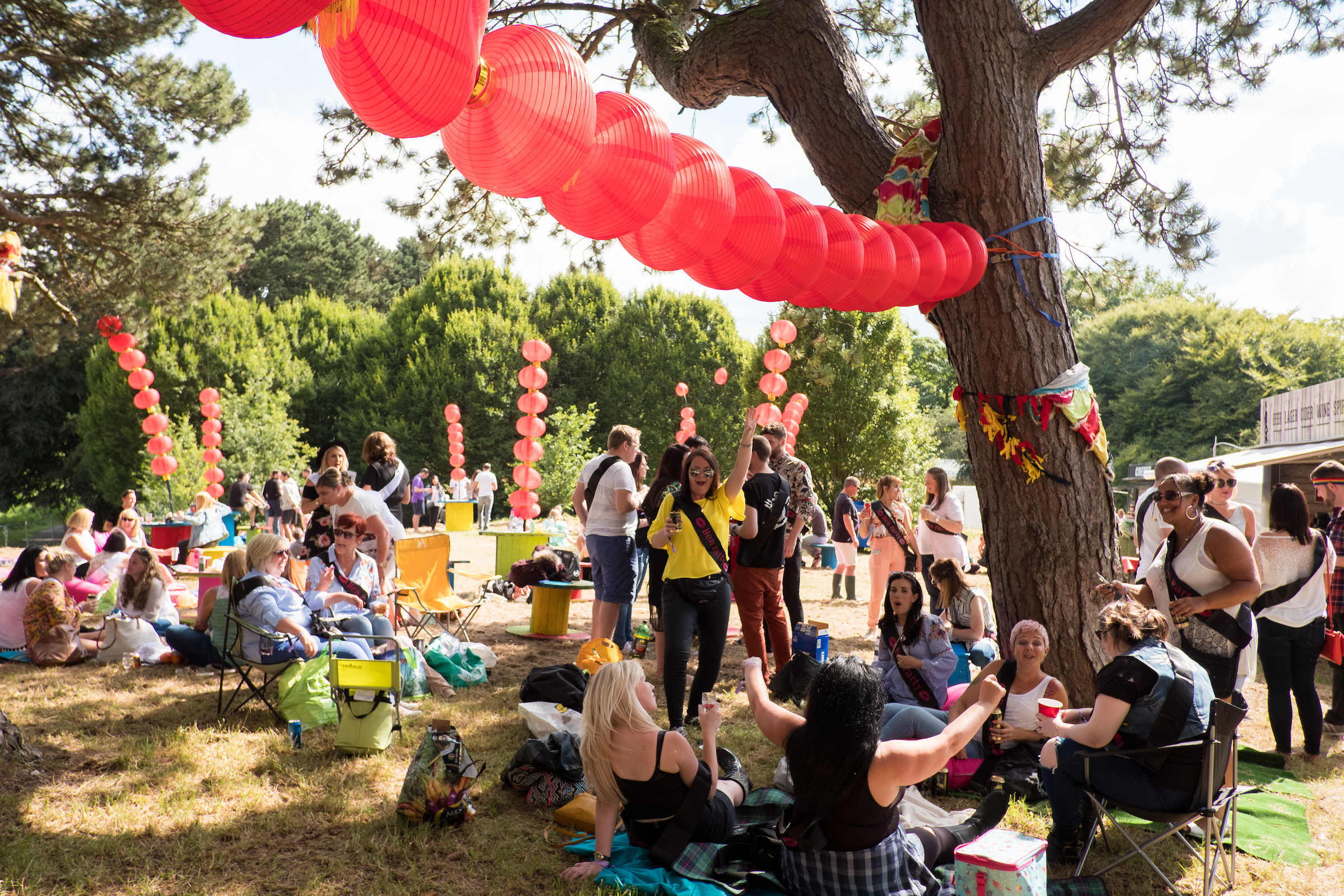
VIP area

Liverpool International Music Festival (LIMF), formerly known as the Liverpool Mathew Street Music Festival, is an event held annually at Sefton Park in Liverpool. It takes place every summer and was Europe's largest free music event, although since 2018 it has become a paid, ticketed event.

Established in 2012, Liverpool International Music Festival is organised by Culture Liverpool. In 2018, over 70 artists including Basement Jaxx, Wiley, Example, Jax Jones, Stefflon Don, Aurora, Young Fathers, Rae Morris, DJ Jazzy Jeff, Trevor Nelson, and Gilles Peterson performed at the festival. Over the two days, LIMF paid homage to Liverpool's ever-evolving relationship with music and its creative cultural diversity. The festival features up to 18 hours of live music across three stages and additional recreational activities.

In addition to the summer festival, LIMF has an award-winning programme called LIMF Academy which gives emerging talent exclusive access to activities and insider know-how from the music industry. Aimed at artists, bands, producers, and DJs between the ages 16–25 from across Merseyside, the Academy is geared towards encouraging young residents to kick-start their music careers. For those selected, the Academy offers performance opportunities at LIMF Summer Jam and other regular showcases, as well as access to an exclusive masterclass day featuring panels of top industry experts.

On top of this, for the top three of those artists, the Academy also offers a 12-month Elite Talent Development Programme, which includes financial investment in their career; a BBC Music Introducing live session; the creation of professional press assets such as photographs, biographies, and EPKs; monthly masterclass sessions with industry leaders on topics such as marketing, promotion, performance, distribution, media training, and funding opportunities; year-round mentoring by an industry professional; and showcase opportunities to key press and industry figures in both Liverpool and London.
