= Andrew Perloff =

Majority owner of British property company Panther Securitie

Andrew Stewart Perloff is the chairman and majority owner of British property company Panther Securities. In 2015, Perloff launched a takeover bid for the Beales department store chain. He sold his shareholding in Beales in 2018.

In 2014, Hertfordshire Life magazine list him on its Rich List at number 42, with an estimated net worth of £44 million. Politically, he has supported the Conservative Party, UKIP and Reform UK.
