= Bentalls =

British department store chain

Coordinates: 51.4111°N 0.3053°W

Bentalls plc
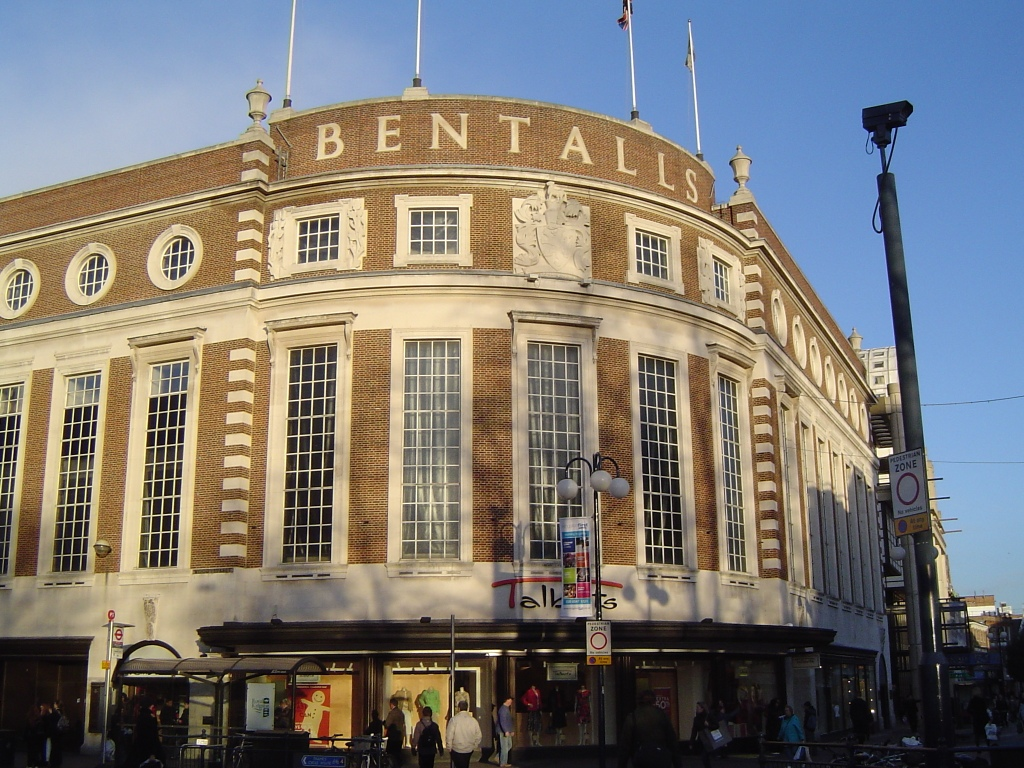
- Bentalls facade in Kingston
- Company type: Unlisted public company
- Industry: Retail
- Genre: Department Store
- Founded: 1867
- Founder: Frank Bentall
- Defunct: 2001 (Company), 2023 (Name)
- Headquarters: Kingston upon Thames, United Kingdom
- Key people: Leonard Edward Rowan Bentall (Chairman 1968-78, President 1978-93)
- Parent: Fenwick
- Website: www.bentallcentre.co.uk

Bentalls was a British department store chain based in Kingston upon Thames. The well regarded department store began as a drapery shop, founded by Frank Bentall in 1867. The business expanded significantly throughout the 20th century and operated a group of department stores in southern England. The company was formerly listed on the London Stock Exchange, but in 2001 was purchased by the private Fenwick group. The Kingston upon Thames store continued to trade under the Bentalls name until 2023, when it was renamed Fenwick.

== History ==
Bentalls was established in 1867 by Frank Bentall who purchased a drapery shop in Kingston upon Thames. The principal buildings of the Kingston store were completed in 1935 to a design by architect Maurice Webb (son of Sir Aston Webb) and inspired by Wren's design for Hampton Court. The fine stonework on the façade was the work of Eric Gill. Between 1935 and 1976 it was the UK's largest department store outside central London.

The company was floated on the London Stock Exchange in 1946, but the Bentall family retained a controlling interest.

Bentalls established their first branch store in 1947 when the Worthing department store of Bentall & Sons was acquired from family cousins who had decided to retire. The Worthing business was significantly extended with the purchase of the Jordan & Cook furniture store in later years.

The Ealing department store of Eldred Sayers & Son was acquired in 1950. Mary Lee of Tunbridge Wells was purchased a decade later.

Rowan Bentall, grandson of founder Frank Bentall, became chairman in 1968. Under his ten-year stewardship the group's turnover more than doubled from £14.5 million to £35.1 million. Developments during this time included the opening of a new purpose-built department store in Bracknell in 1973.

Further profitable stores were later opened in Tonbridge (1982) and Lakeside (1995).

=== The Bentall Centre ===
In 1987, work began on a major shopping centre development in Kingston, in collaboration with Norwich Union. The present Bentalls department store opened in July 1990, with the adjoining shopping centre completed in November 1992. The principal facade and main entrance vestibule of the 1935 building were retained as part of the development and listed at Grade II in 2011.

=== Bristol department store ===
The company made a substantial investment in 1998 to open a large department store in Bristol, purchasing the recently vacated premises of John Lewis and completely refurbishing it.

The group's first foray into the south-west of England was ill-fated, however, with the outlet failing to turn a profit and proving to be a financial drain on the wider business. It was closed within two years.

=== Recent history ===
In 2000, the chain rejected a £27 million offer from competitor Allders. In January 2001, the loss-making Bristol store was sold to House of Fraser for £16.35 million.

In June of that year, the family-owned rival department store chain Fenwick purchased Bentalls for £70.8 million. The Bentall family's shareholding at the time was 38%, with Frank Bentall's great-grandson Edward Bentall being the chairman. The company's turnover was £108.2 million, trading across six department stores.

Fenwick subsequently sold the Lakeside store to Allders and the leases of the Bentalls sites in Ealing, Tonbridge and Worthing to the Bournemouth-based Beales group. The successful stores in Kingston upon Thames and Bracknell were retained. The Bracknell branch was replaced in September 2017 by a new Fenwick store as part of The Lexicon development.

The former flagship Bentalls department store in Kingston upon Thames was rebranded as Fenwick in 2023. As of 2025 Bentalls PLC still exists as a company, though it has been classified as dormant since 2017.

== Department store locations ==
- Bracknell (opened 1973; closed 2017 to coincide with the opening a new Fenwick store in the town)
- Bristol (opened 1998 in premises previously occupied by John Lewis, originally by Lewis's; sold to House of Fraser in 2001)
- Chatham (formerly Edward Bates, acquired 1979; closed 1984)
- Ealing (formerly Eldred Sayers & Son, acquired 1950; sold to Beales in 2002)
- Kingston upon Thames (founded 1867; present department store building opened 1990, Bentall Centre completed 1992, renamed Fenwick, 2023)
- Lakeside (opened 1992 in premises previously occupied by Lewis's; sold to Allders in 2001)
- Tonbridge (opened 1982; sold to Beales in 2002)
- Tunbridge Wells (formerly Mary Lee and originally Frederick Wickham, acquired 1960; closed 29 July 1995)
- Worthing (formerly Bentall & Sons, acquired 1947; sold to Beales in 2002)

== In popular culture ==
Singer Dusty Springfield once worked at Bentalls in Ealing and singer Petula Clark gave her first public performance as a child at Bentalls in Kingston upon Thames.

Bentalls is mentioned by the character Chubb in the Anthony Blunt episode (A Question of Attribution) of the stage play Single Spies by Alan Bennett.

Bentalls features in the Ladybird Books People at Work series, appearing in In A Big Store. The Wood Street entrance is also illustrated in The Police, as part of a night time scene where two police constables are arresting suspected burglars.

Bentalls is mentioned as a location in the novel The Curious Incident of the Dog in the Night-time by Mark Haddon and in the stage version by Simon Stevens adapted from the novel. Swindon where the novel is set does not have a Bentalls store. Bentalls features as the location where Judy has a traumatic experience when her neurodivergent son Christopher causes a scene.

== Gallery ==
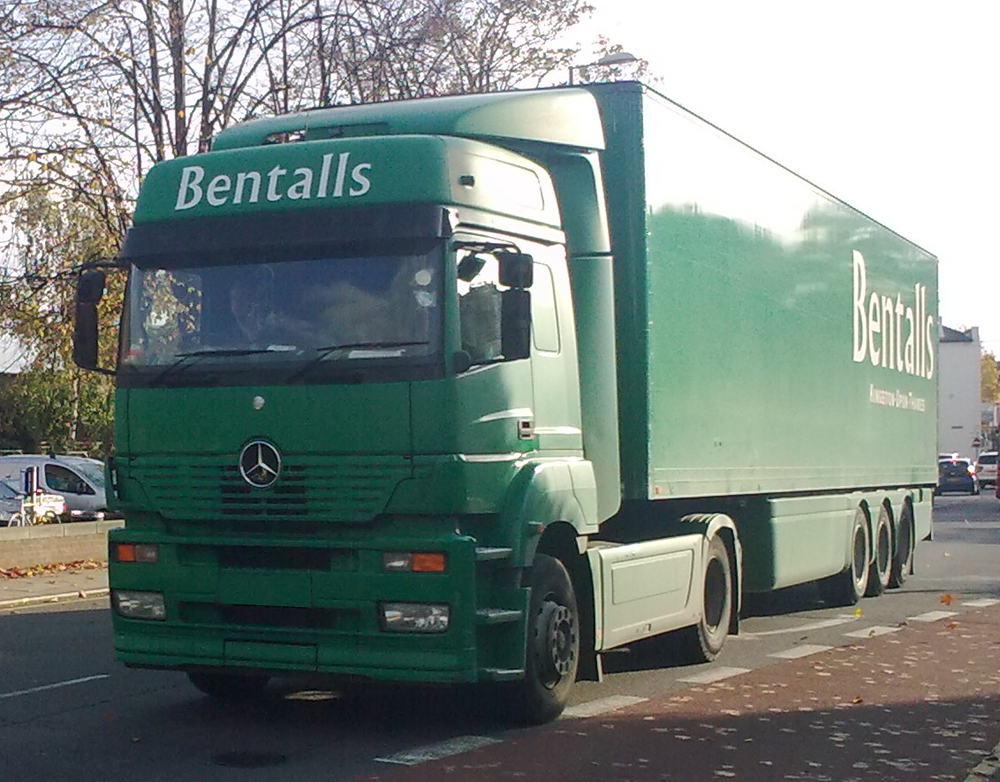
A Bentalls delivery lorry in Kingston upon Thames

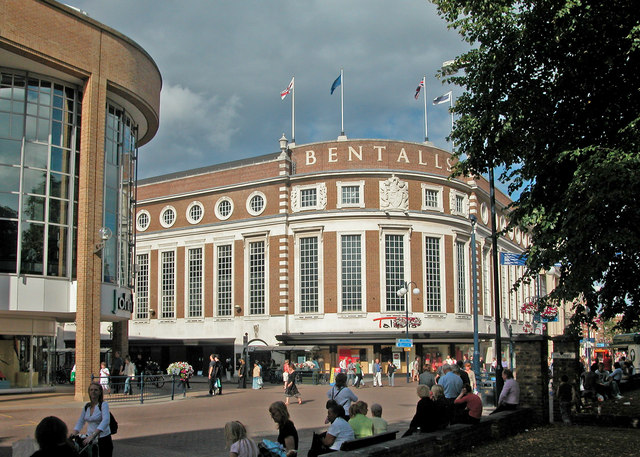
Bentalls' 1935 facade inspired by Hampton Court Palace

== Arms ==
Coat of arms of Bentalls

Notes
Granted 10 May 1967
Crest
On a wreath Or and Vert a leopard statant Argent pellety flying from a crown about the neck Or a scarf parted Or and Vert.
Escutcheon
Or a lion rampant queue fourchee Azure ducally crowned Or and on a chief Azure a salmon naiant Argent finned Gules.
Motto
To Strive To Seek To Serve
