= MK One =

British fashion retailer

- Company type: Limited
- Industry: Fashion retail
- Founded: 1985
- Founder: Mark Brafman
- Defunct: May 2009
- Fate: Administration; many stores bought by Internacionale
- Headquarters: Acton, London (HQ)
- Number of locations: 125 (pre Internacionale takeover)
- Area served: United Kingdom
- Products: Clothing (principally women's)
- Owner: Internacionale Retail
- Number of employees: 800 (approx) (2,500 May 2008)

MK One was a British fashion retailer.

== History ==
=== Beginnings as Mark One ===
The company was founded in the 1980s by Mark Brafman, Les Lucy and Alan Simons as Mark One, and became a discount womenswear retailer. In February 1996, Mark One was bought from administration by billionaire Philip Green, future owner of BHS. Shami Ahmed had also made a failed bid for the company in 1996. In the end of the 1990s, a change to the firm's logo saw the firm's name begin to be commonly spelled as "MK One".

In July 2003, Green sold most of stake in MK One, whilst keeping 10%, to Elaine McPherson, the managing director, and David Thompson, the finance director.

=== Sale to Baugur ===
In November 2004, the 177 store MK One chain was bought by the Icelandic group Baugur for £55 million (this included £11 million worth of debts); in February 2009, Baugur itself entered the equivalent of administration. Les Johnston became chief executive, and Andy Hall became finance director. Johnston and Hall took a 20% stake in the chain, while Baugur, had a 41% shareholding.

The banks Landsbanki and Barclays provided debt, taking 36% of MK One. Arev, a consulting firm, took 3%. McPherson and Thompson left the group. Baugur had planned to expand to chain to around 450 stores. In 2007, the company made losses of £17.4 million.

=== Sale to Hilco, administration and sale to Brafman ===
In May 2008, a majority stake in the 170 store company was sold to Hilco, a restructuring specialist. Three weeks later in May, Hilco appointed Deloitte as administrators, to find a buyer for MK One.

The company was sold from administration back to Mark Brafman, its founder, via Jet Star Retail. Bali Singh took over as boss when Brafman left in October, and Singh tried to acquire more funds to allow the business to continue. One of the company's suppliers, which had not been paid, started the bankruptcy proceedings. Around sixty of the stores were closed.

=== Administration and sale to Internacionale Retail ===
Deloitte continued to act for MK One's original lenders, but was forced to place MK One into administration with Leonard Curtis. On 20 November, the 125 store chain entered administration, putting 1,400 jobs at risk. Leonard Curtis said that there had been a number of expressions of interest for the company.

On 25 November, eighty stores were sold by administrators (Neil Bennett of Leonard Curtis) to Internacionale Retail. The textiles group from India, S. Kumars Nationwide, purchased Glasgow based Internacionale earlier in May 2008. The head office in Acton, west London, was closed. By May 2009, all MK One stores that were purchased by Internacionale had been rebranded under that firm's name.
