= Internacionale =

British clothing retailer

Internacionale Retail Ltd.
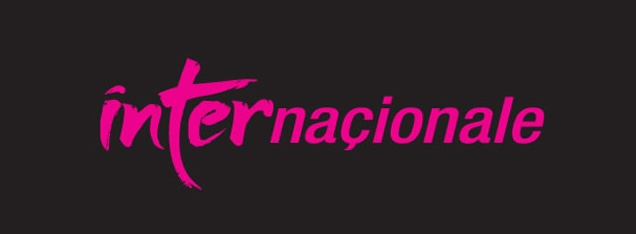
- Company type: Private limited company
- Industry: Retail
- Founded: 1980
- Headquarters: Glasgow, Scotland, UK
- Products: Clothing

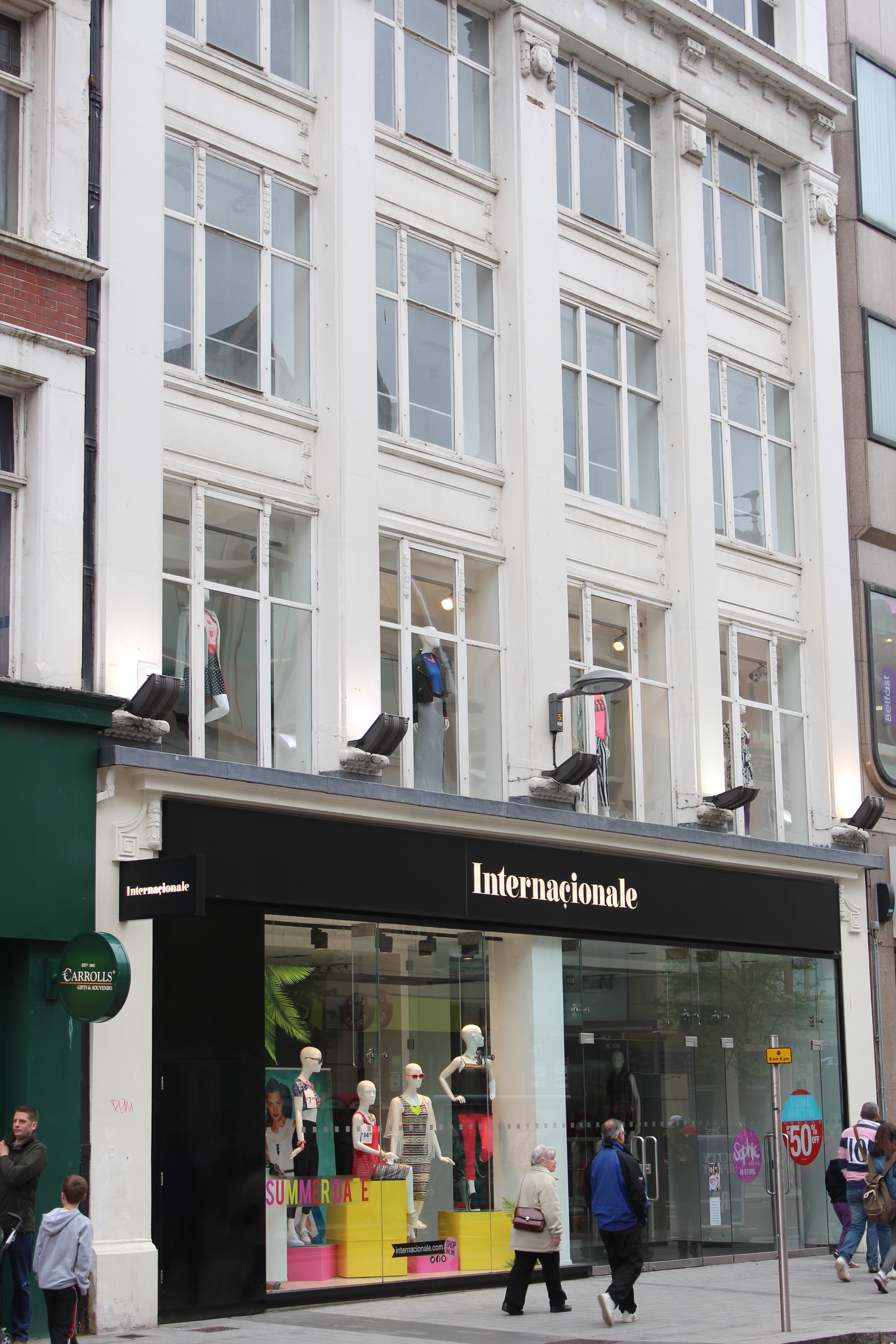
An Internacionale store in Belfast

Internacionale was a British retailer of fashion apparel and home accessories that sold women's wear including dresses, tops, jeans, trousers, jackets and jewellery. Headquartered in Glasgow, Scotland, Internacionale had stores throughout the United Kingdom. It operated under the brand Internacionale in numerous city centres in the UK, while having homeware stores under the brand Au Naturale.

== History ==
The company was created by Ken Cairnduff, a Scottish businessman in 1980 and grew to become known as Internacionale. The business was sold in 2006 to a management buyout, which at the time had 150 stores.

In 2013, the company went into administration and was then sold to Internacionale UK, a new company backed by the existing shareholders of the former company. The sale kept more than 1,500 jobs alive in 114 remaining stores of Internacionale at that time.

The company entered administration for the third time since 2008 on 28 February 2014. In September 2014, Edinburgh Woollen Mill agreed to purchase the intellectual property of Internacionale. In 2020, due to the COVID-19 pandemic, Edinburgh Woollen Mill itself went into administration.
