= Jeffrey M. Perloff =

American economist

Jeffrey M. Perloff is an American economics professor at the University of California, Berkeley. He is most noted for his textbooks on Industrial Organization, jointly written with Dennis Carlton, and Microeconomics.

== Selected publications ==
- Carlton, D. W., & Perloff, J. M. (1990). Modern industrial organization (p. 405). Scott, Foresman/Little, Brown Higher Education.
- Perloff, J. M., & Salop, S. C. (1985). Equilibrium with product differentiation. The Review of Economic Studies, 52(1), 107–120.
- Perloff, Jeffrey M. (2004). Microeconomics. Boston: Pearson Addison Wesley.
- Perloff, Jeffrey M., Larry S. Karp, and Amos Golan. (2007). Estimating market power and strategies. New York, NY: Cambridge University Press.
- Perloff, Jeffrey M. Microeconomics: Theory and Applications with calculus
