= Annie Russell-Cotes =

British hotelier (1835–1920)

Annie Russell-Cotes Lady Russell-Cotes
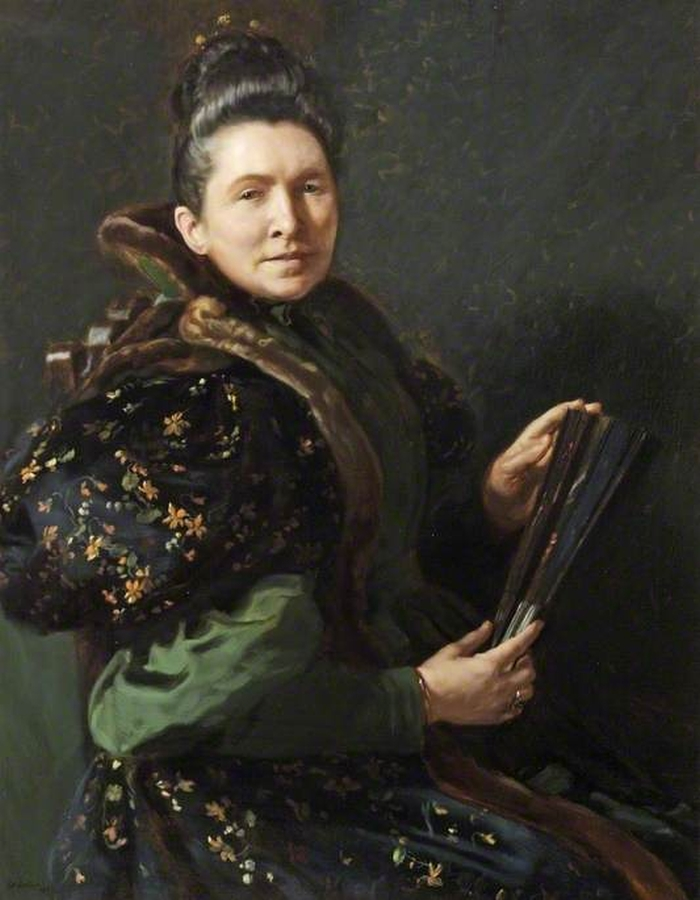
- Portrait by John Henry Lorimer
- Born: Annie Nelson-Clark; July 1835; Glasgow, Scotland
- Died: 17 April 1920 (aged 84); Bournemouth, England
- Resting place: Wimborne Road Cemetery
- Known for: Mayoress of Bournemouth
- Spouse: Sir Merton Russell-Cotes
- Children: 5

Annie, Lady Russell-Cotes (née Nelson-Clark; July 1835 – 17 April 1920) was a British hotelier and philanthropist in the 19th century. She was the mayoress of Bournemouth as the wife of Mayor of Bournemouth Merton Russell-Cotes. The couple became wealthy hoteliers as the owners of the Royal Bath Hotel. Their collections from their worldwide travels are on display at the Russell-Cotes Art Gallery & Museum on East Cliff.

== Biography ==
Annie Nelson Clark was born in Glasgow as the daughter of John King Clark and Ann Nelson. She met Merton Russell-Cotes in 1854 and married him on at St. Jude’s Episcopal Church on 1 February 1860.

She and her husband moved to Bournemouth in 1876 and bought the Royal Bath Hotel. The Russell-Cotes Art Gallery & Museum was built in the grounds. Then called East Cliff Hall, the building was given to his wife for her birthday. The art gallery is described as an art nouveau villa.

The couple travelled widely including to Japan and Russia. They collected a diverse range of works of art and artefacts from around the world. The museum is noted as a "rare survivor as the residence of a Victorian private collector".

She and her husband were parents and grandparents, and regularly hosted events for local children. She died in 1920 and was buried at Wimborne Road Cemetery, Bournemouth.
