= Merton Russell-Cotes =

English mayor (1835–1921)

Sir Merton Russell-Cotes
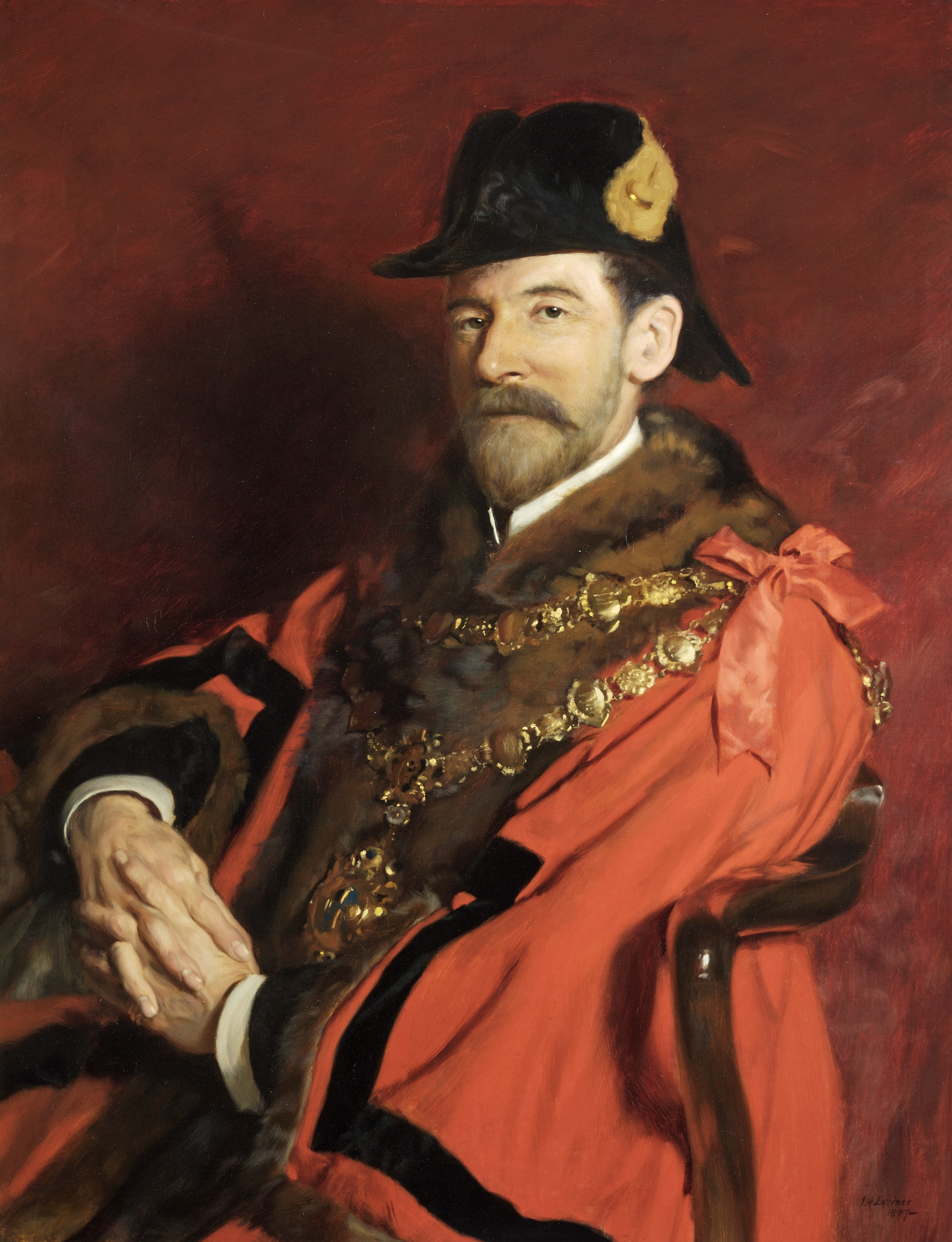
- Merton Russell-Cotes in 1897
- Born: 8 May 1835; Wolverhampton, England
- Died: 27 January 1921 (aged 85); Bournemouth, England
- Resting place: Wimborne Road Cemetery
- Known for: Mayor of Bournemouth
- Spouse: Annie Russell-Cotes
- Children: 5

Sir Merton Russell-Cotes FRGS (Wolverhampton 8 May 1835 – 27 January 1921 Bournemouth) was Mayor of Bournemouth, England, 1894–95. During his Mayoralty, Meyrick Park, two free libraries, and the first two schools of art in the borough were opened.

Although his name is usually hyphenated today, there is no hyphen in his Who's Who entry or the London Gazette entry for his knighthood, and he is described on the plaque marking the opening of the Undercliff Drive and Promenade as Cllr. Cotes, not Cllr. Russell-Cotes.

== Royal Bath Hotel ==
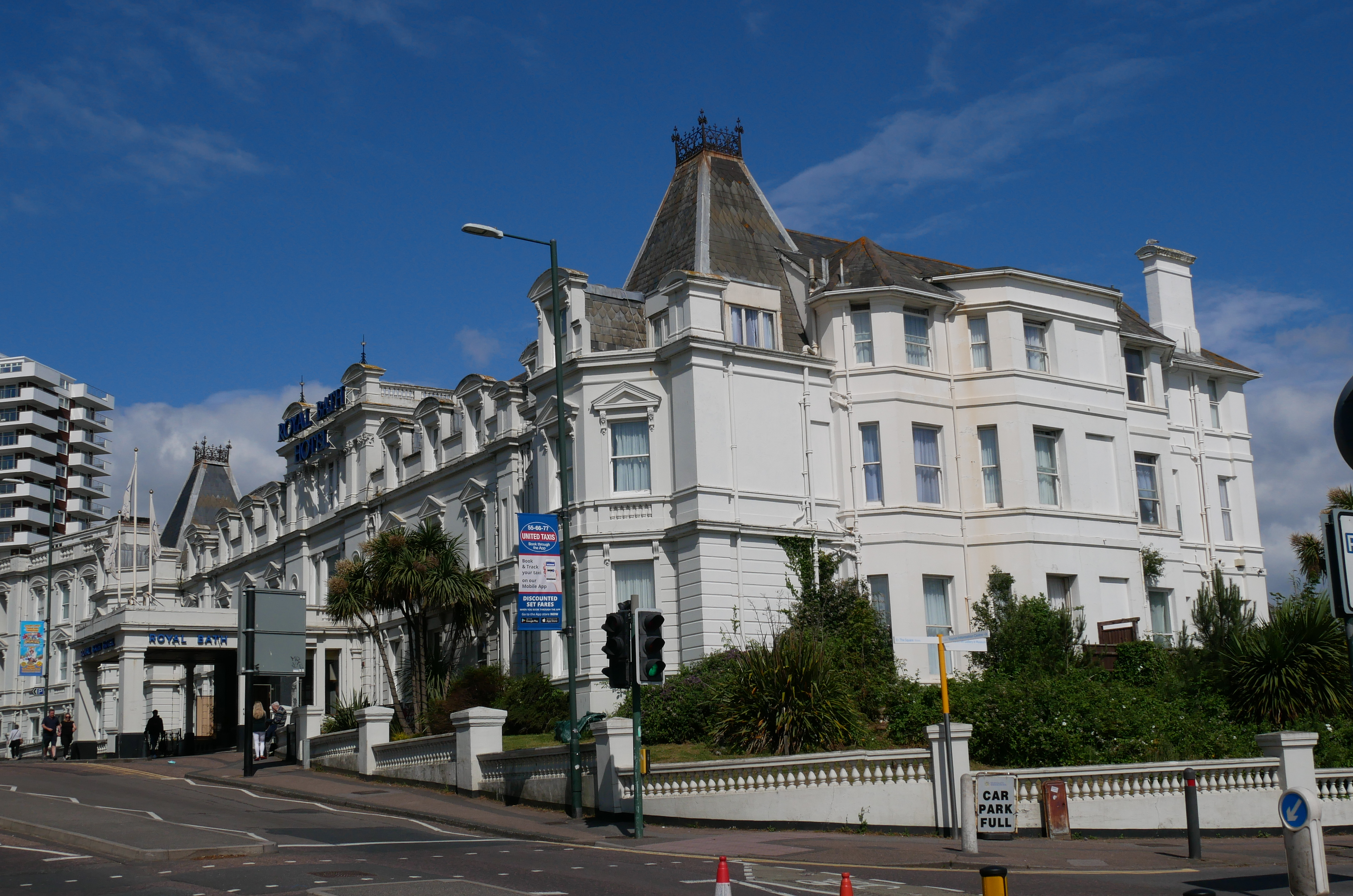
Royal Bath Hotel

He moved to Bournemouth, Hampshire (now Dorset) in 1876 with his wife Annie. Soon after this, they bought the Bath Hotel. They quickly enlarged the hotel and renamed it the Royal Bath Hotel because the Prince of Wales had stayed there in 1856.

== Civic activities ==
Russell-Cotes was elected to the Board of Commissioners in 1883 and fought hard to enhance the town's reputation as a health resort. He called for a direct railway link from Brockenhurst to Bournemouth to avoid having to change trains at Ringwood. He also campaigned for 'Undercliff Drive' to enable invalids to take a carriage drive beside the sea.

When Bournemouth became a borough in 1890, he presented the mace—a replica of that presented to Wolverhampton by Queen Elizabeth I.

=== Mayor of Bournemouth ===
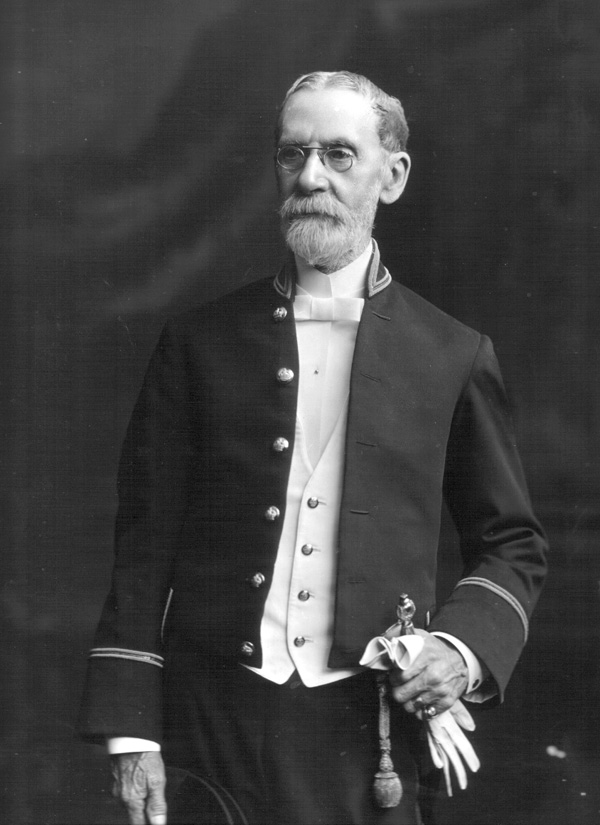
Sir Merton Russell-Cotes photographed in connection with his receipt of a knighthood in 1909

Russell-Cotes was offered the mayoralty in 1893 but declined it due to temporary ill health. He became mayor in 1894.

=== East Cliff Hall ===
When Undercliff Drive opened in 1907, it was announced that Annie and Merton wanted to give their recently completed home, East Cliff Hall, and its contents to the people of Bournemouth.

Russell-Cotes amassed a large collection of works of art and curios. Those donated to the town are displayed in the Russell-Cotes Art Gallery & Museum, Bournemouth's principal museum, which is located in East Cliff Hall and is named in his honour.

He was a friend of the actor, Sir Henry Irving, who stayed with him on several occasions.

=== Freedom of the Borough ===
The Russell-Cotes were granted the Freedom of the Borough of Bournemouth in 1908. Russell-Cotes was knighted in 1909.

== Personal life ==
He was married to Annie Russell-Cotes and they had 5 children.

== Sources ==
- Who's Who, 1920.
