= Percy May Bright =

British collector of butterflies and stamps and the owner of Brights and Sons

Percy May Bright (1863 – 7 February 1941) was a British collector of butterflies, stamps and the owner of the department store Brights and Sons. He was founder of the Bournemouth Natural Science Society and a Fellow of the Royal Entomological Society. He served as mayor for Bournemouth for three terms from 1929 to 1931.

Bright was born in Mirzapur, India where his father, Frederick John Bright (1832-1905), originally from Braintree, Essex, worked with the London Missionary Society. The family returned to England due to the poor health of his mother (Julia Eliza née May) and they set up a photography studio, a printing press, and a store selling needlework, wool, and later books. Bright grew up to manage what became the departmental store of Bright & Colson. He also took part in activities of the London Missionary Society, making a trip to India. He became a Justice of Peace and served as Mayor of Bournemouth for three terms from 1929. In 1941, returning from a trip to the grave of his wife, he was killed when he was hit by a coal lorry while crossing Charminster Road. He is buried at Wimborne Road Cemetery, Bournemouth.

Bright collected stamps, antiques, fine furniture, and lepidoptera. He founded a stamp market in London and was a member of the South London Entomological and Natural History Society from 1890 and along with H.A. Leeds he published the Monograph of the British Aberrations of the Chalk-hill Blue (1938). His vast collection of lepidoptera went to Lord Walter Rothschild.
