= Royal Bath Hotel =

Building in Bournemouth, Dorset, England

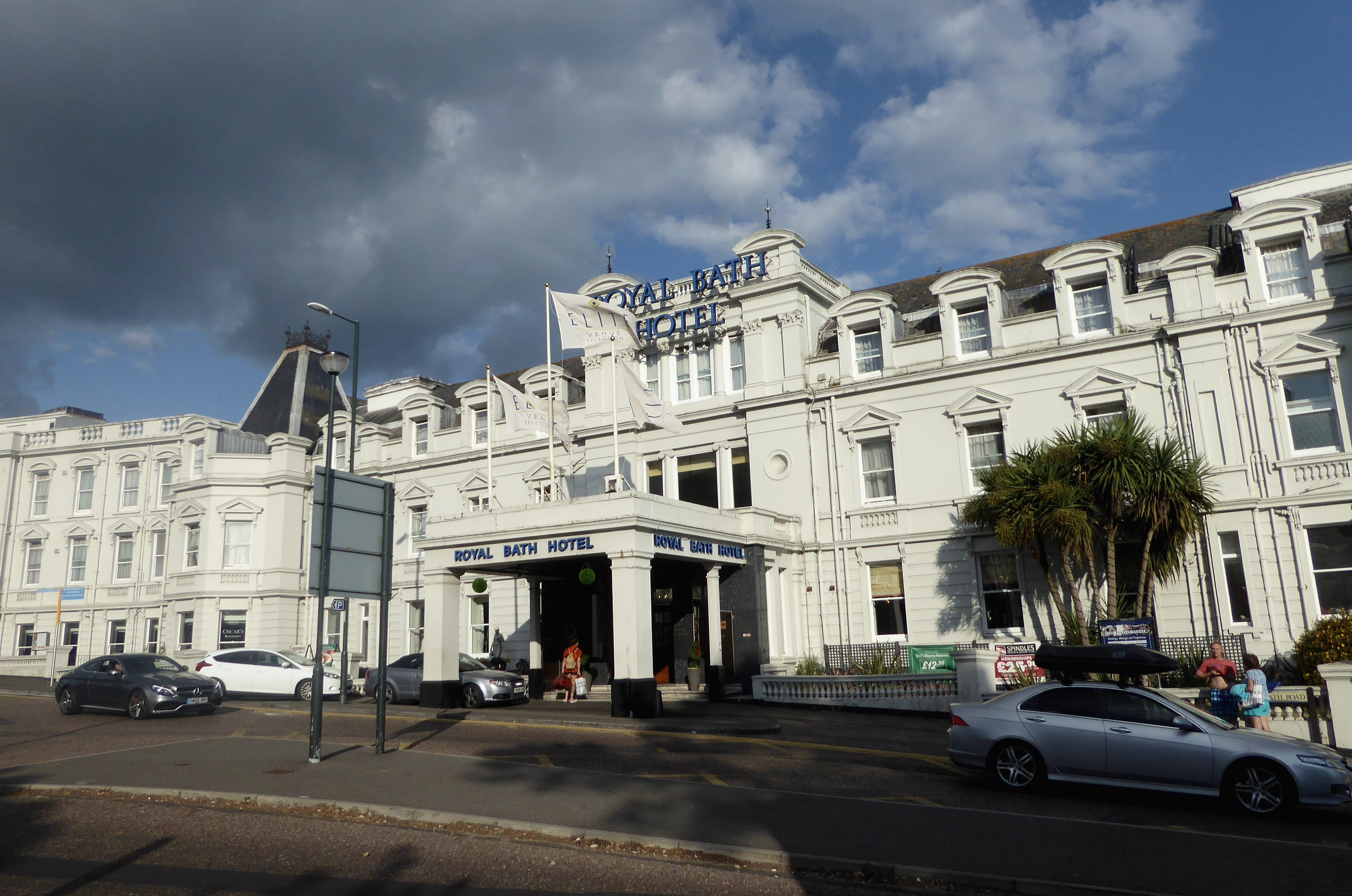
- The hotel pictured in 2019
- Interactive map of the Royal Bath Hotel area
- Etymology: Queen Victoria

General information
- Status: Completed
- Type: hotel
- Architectural style: Italianate architecture
- Location: BH1 2EW, Bath Road, Bournemouth, United Kingdom
- Coordinates: 50.717545°N 1.872605°W
- Year built: 1830s
- Opened: June 1838
- Renovated: 1878; 2026
- Owner: Britannia Hotels

Technical details
- Floor count: 3

Design and construction
- Architect: Benjamin Ferrey
- Designations: Grade II listed building

Renovating team
- Architect: Christopher Crabb Creeke

The Royal Bath Hotel is a historic building in Bournemouth, Dorset. It is owned by Britannia Hotels and is regarded to be the town's most famous hotel. Since 1974, the hotel has been a Grade II listed building. It is the oldest hotel in Bournemouth and was formerly owned by the Mayor of Bournemouth, Merton Russell-Cotes.

== History ==
The Bath Hotel was built in 1838. It was designed by Benjamin Ferrey for landowner George Tapps-Gervis. The hotel opened on Queen Victoria's coronation day in June 1838, becoming the first hotel in Bournemouth. The 1878 extension was designed by Christopher Crabb Creeke. Major-General Richard Clement Moody, the founder of British Columbia, died at the hotel on 31 March 1887. Famous guests over the years include Oscar Wilde, Benjamin Disraeli.

In January 1979 the east wing of the hotel was destroyed by fire. In 2011 an elderly grandmother was accidentally scalded to death in a bathtub. In 2012, the hotel was put up for sale. In 2014 there was a robbery at the hotel. In 2019, armed police were called after a man was stabbed in one of the hotel rooms. The hotel hosted a Coastal Comic Con in 2019.

In March 2024, it was announced that the hotel would undertake a £1 million renovation. The large-scale refurbishment project which involves renovating all 208 bedrooms and bathrooms, addressing structural issues, and upgrading the dining and bar areas is expected to be completed by 2026.

== Gallery ==
=== Exterior ===
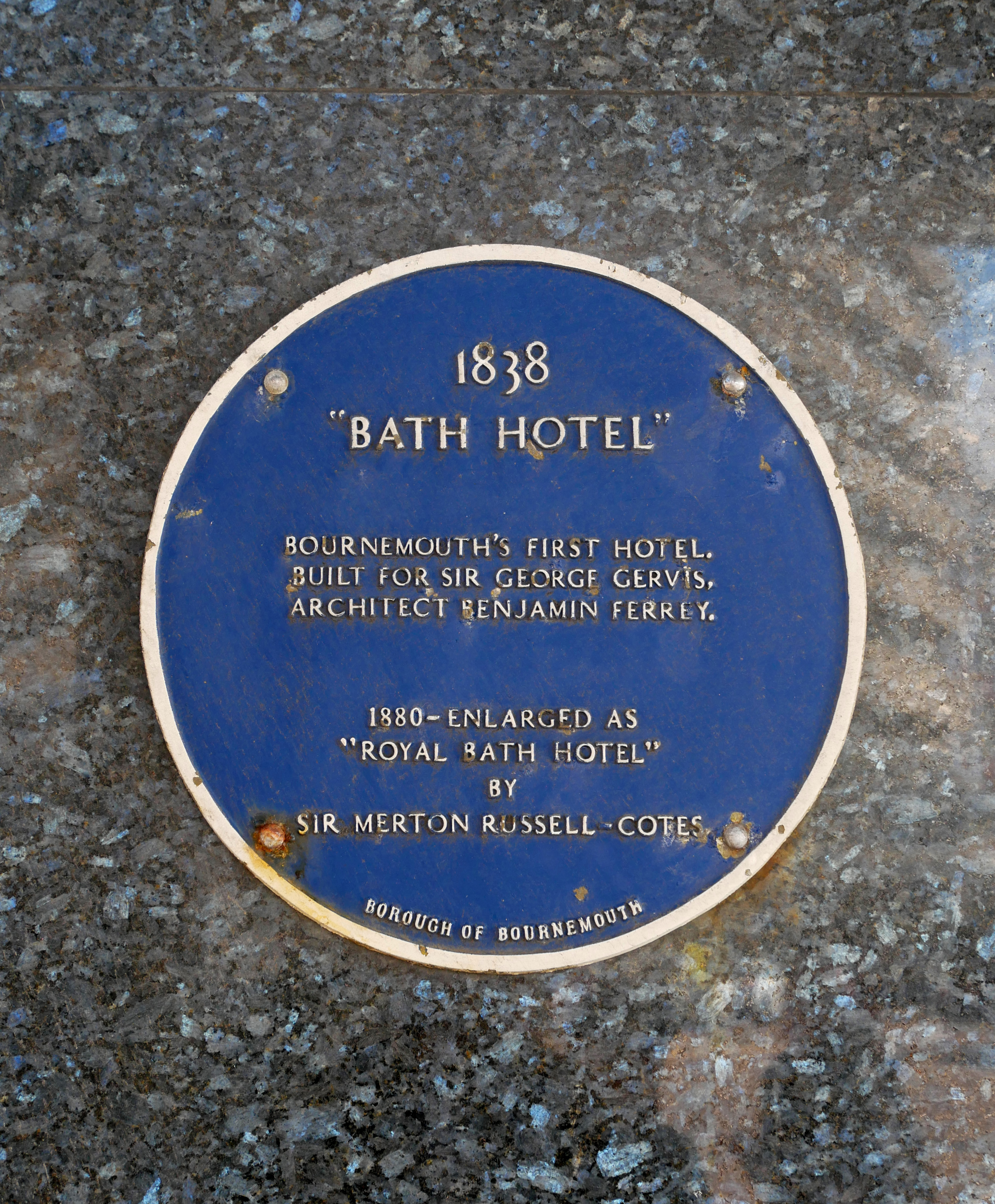
Blue plaque

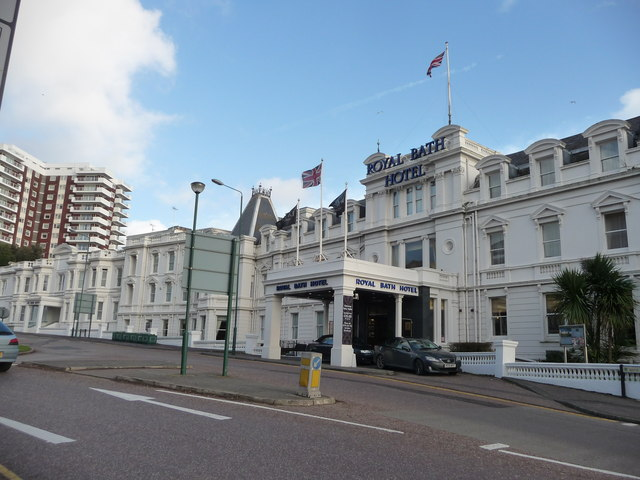

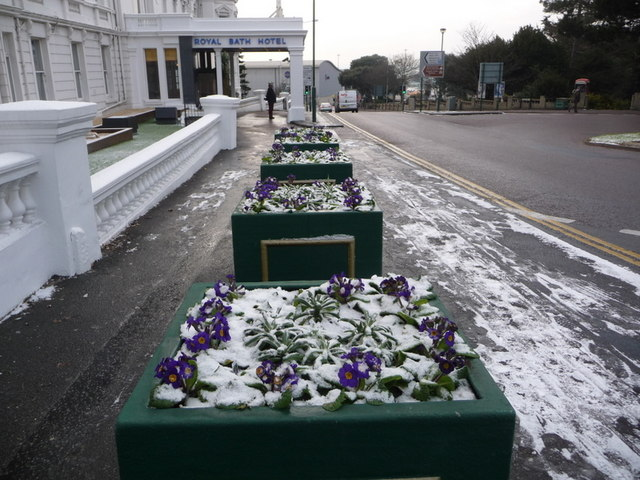

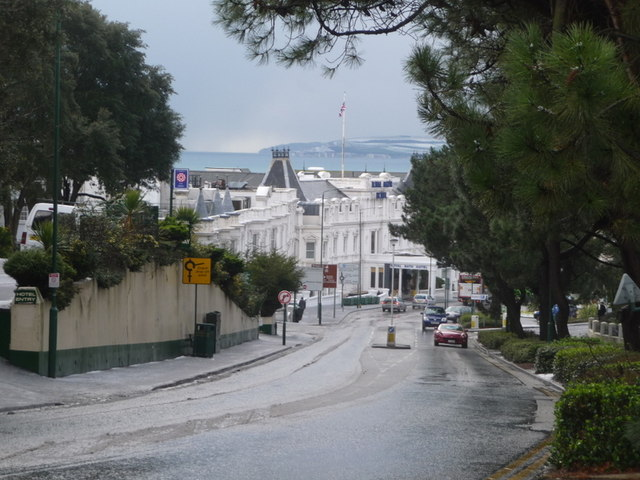

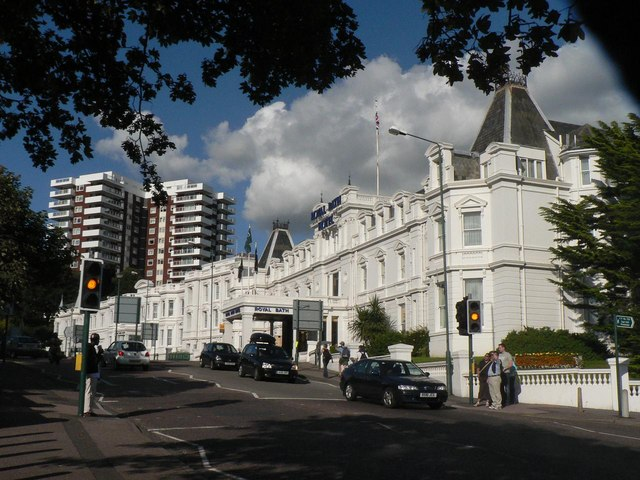

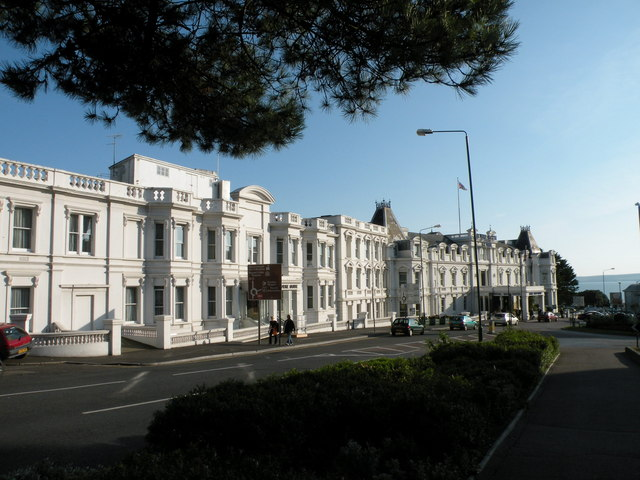

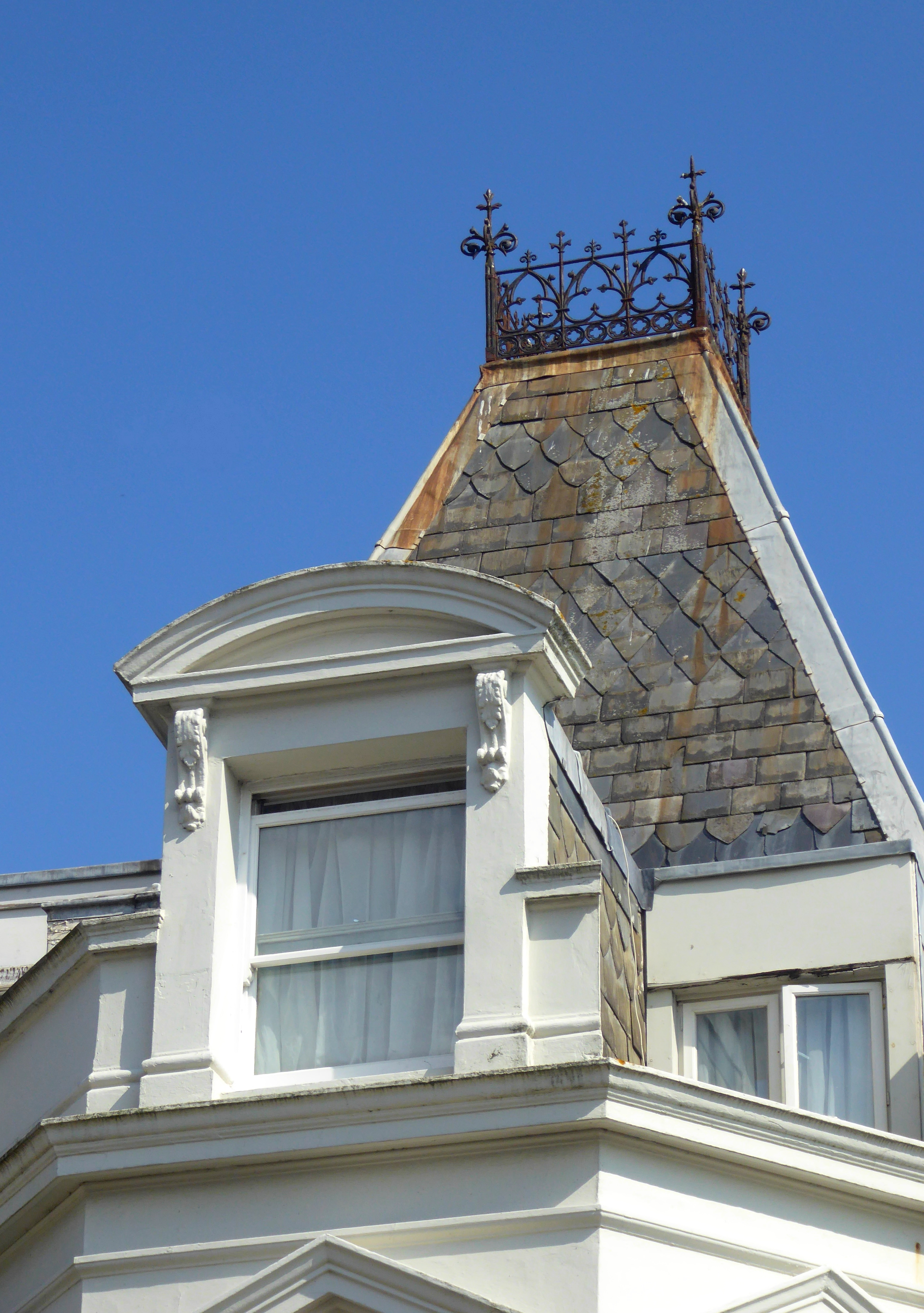
Roofing detail

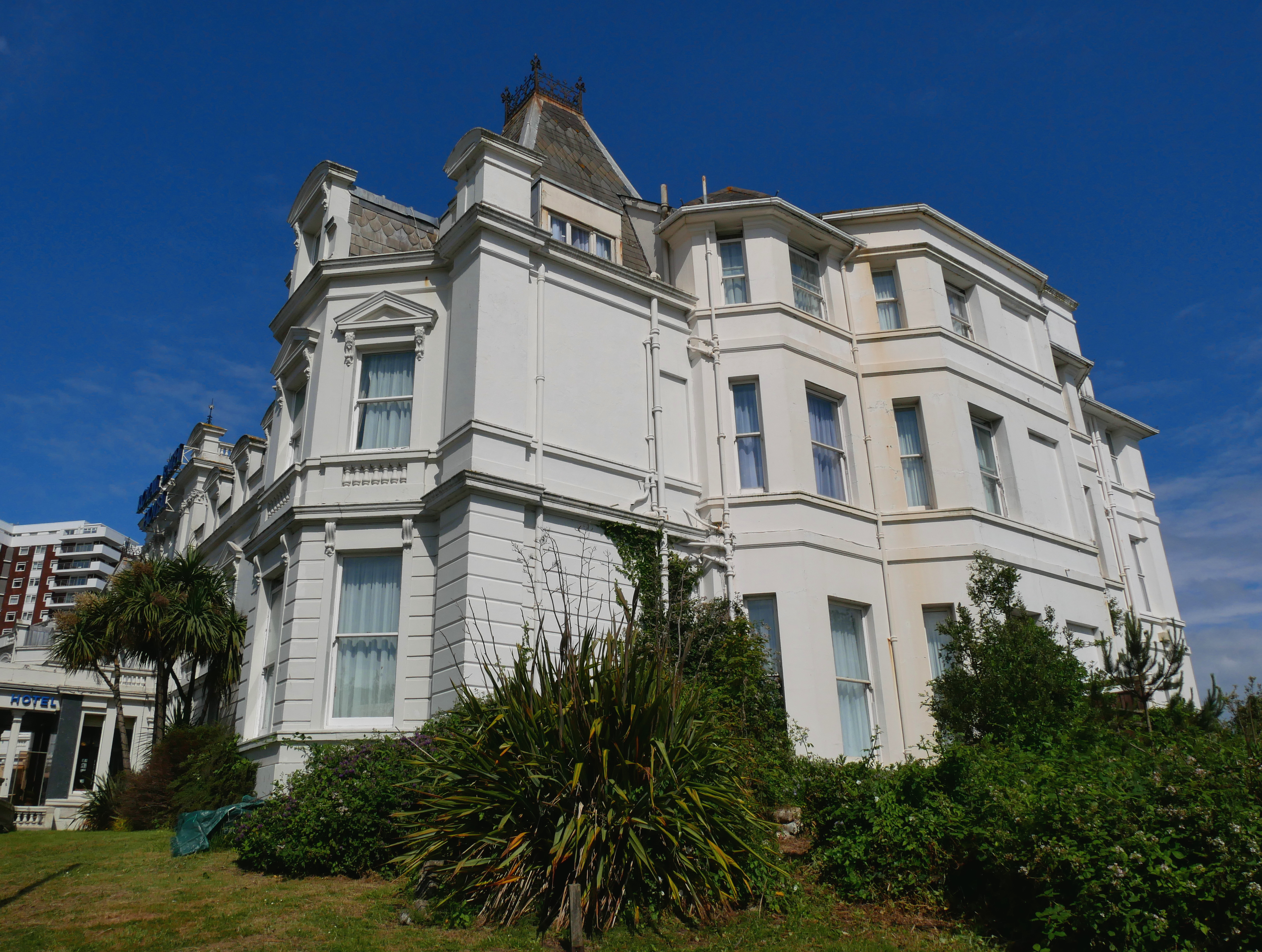
South Face

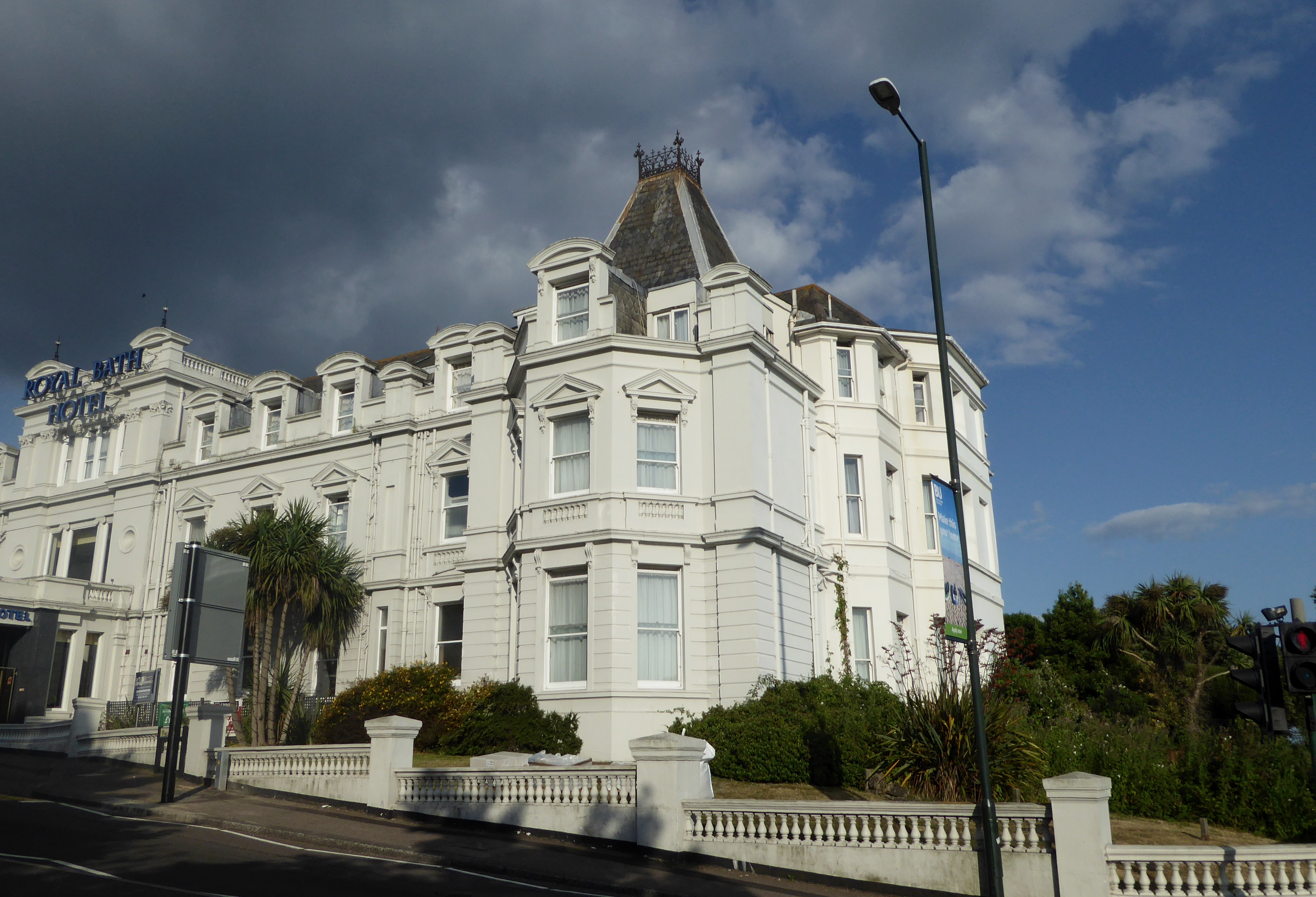
Southern End

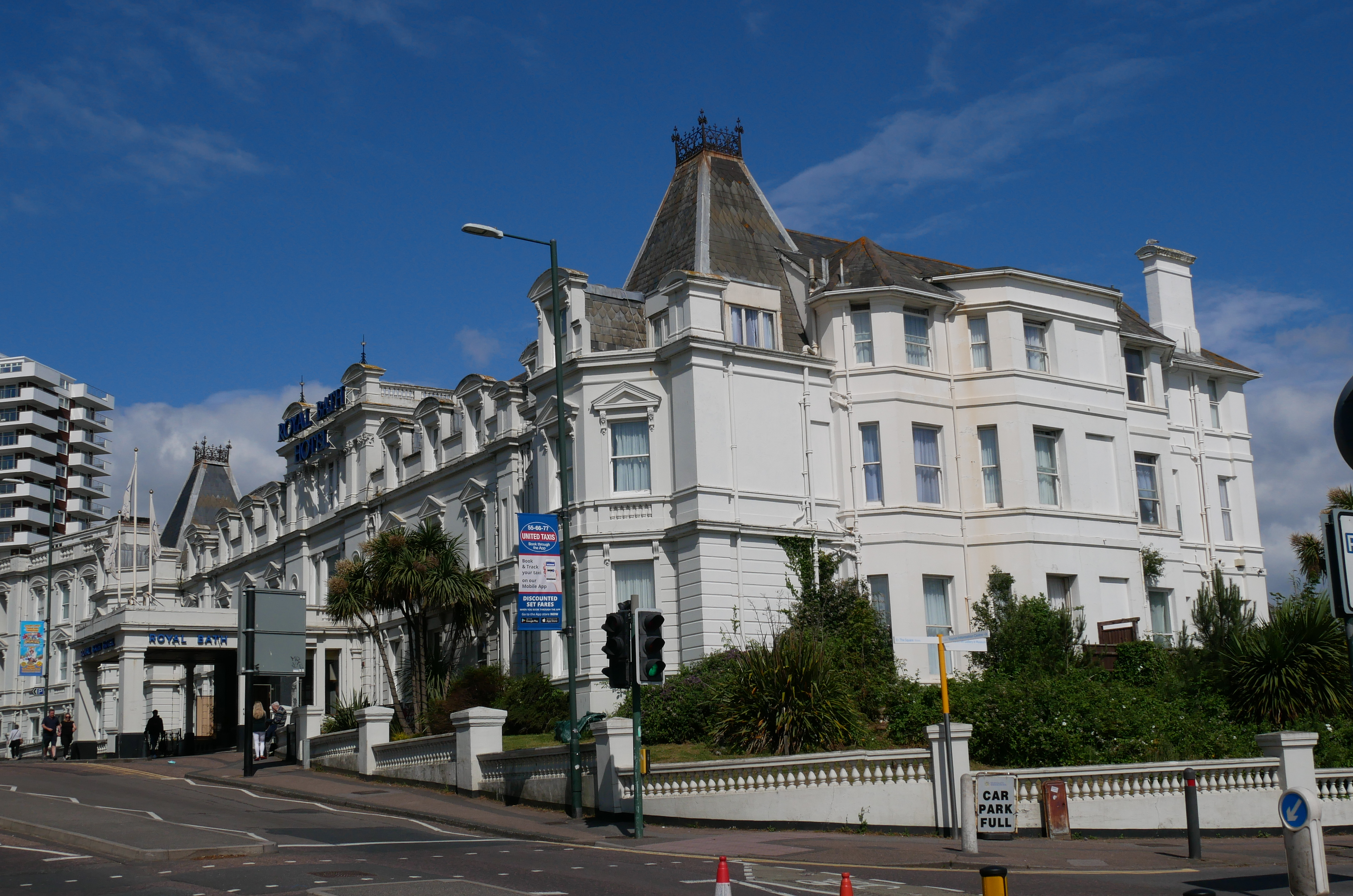
Southwest View

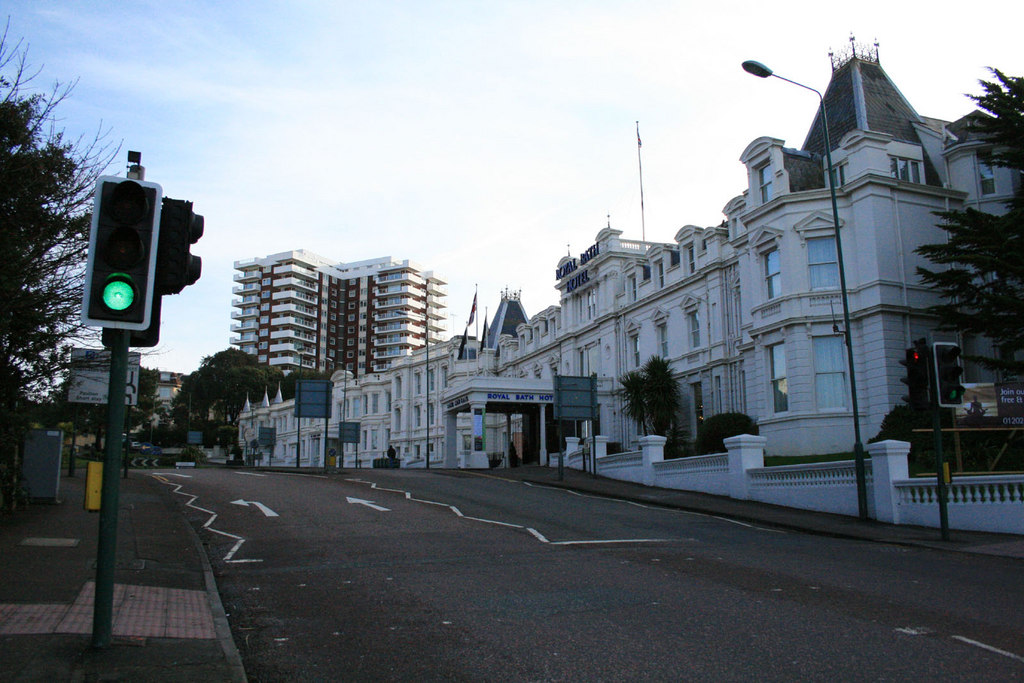

=== Interior ===
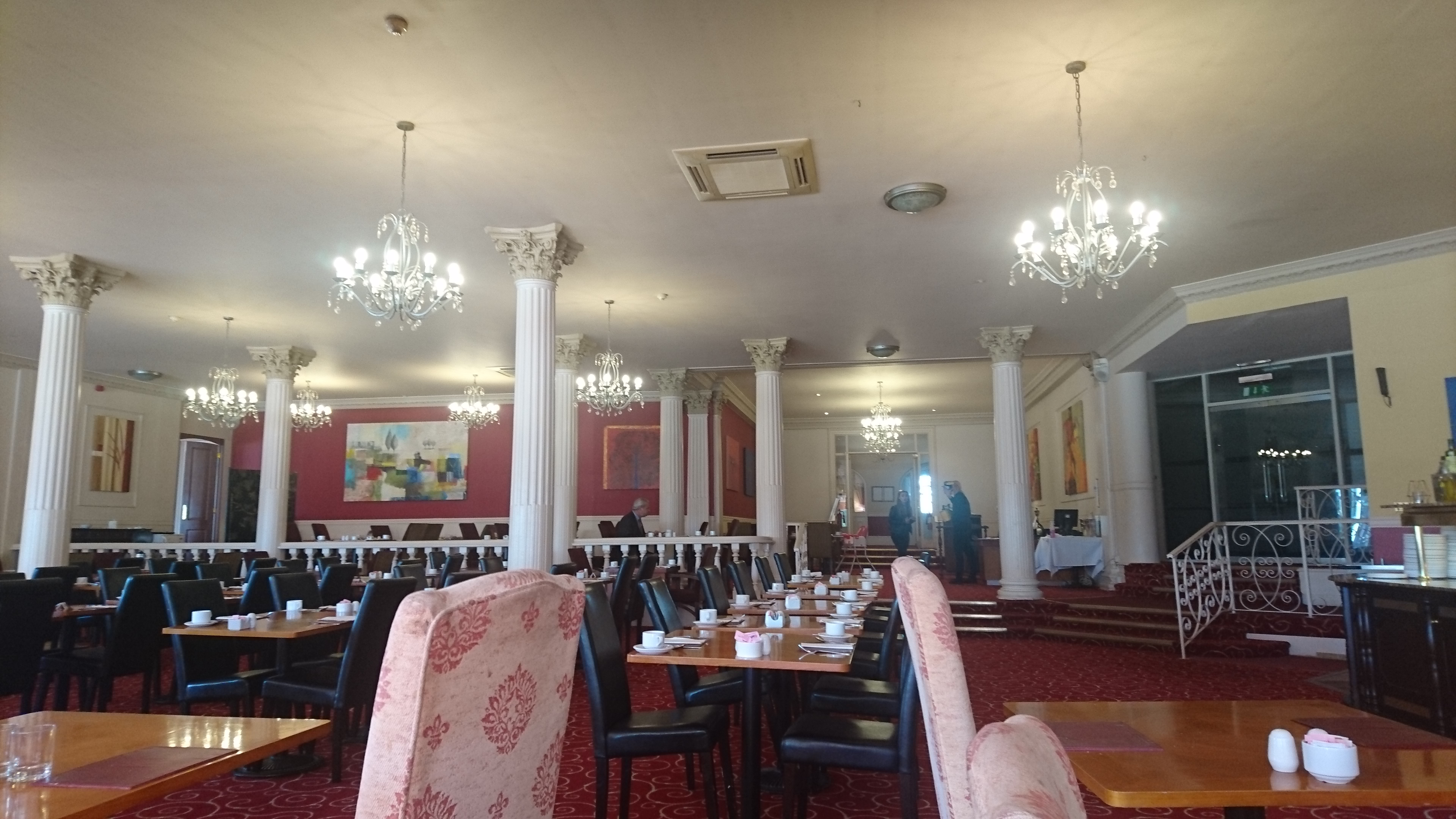

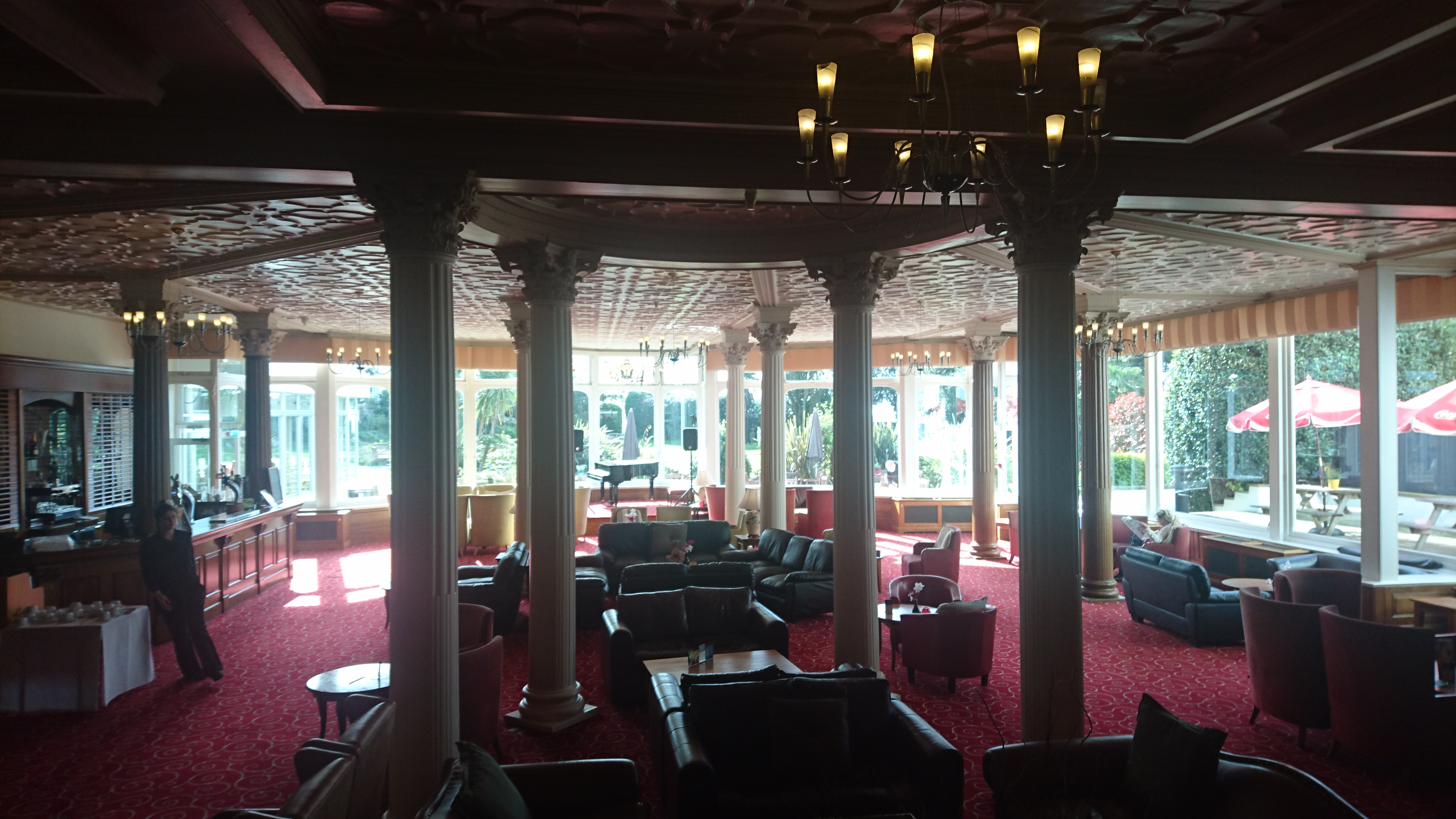

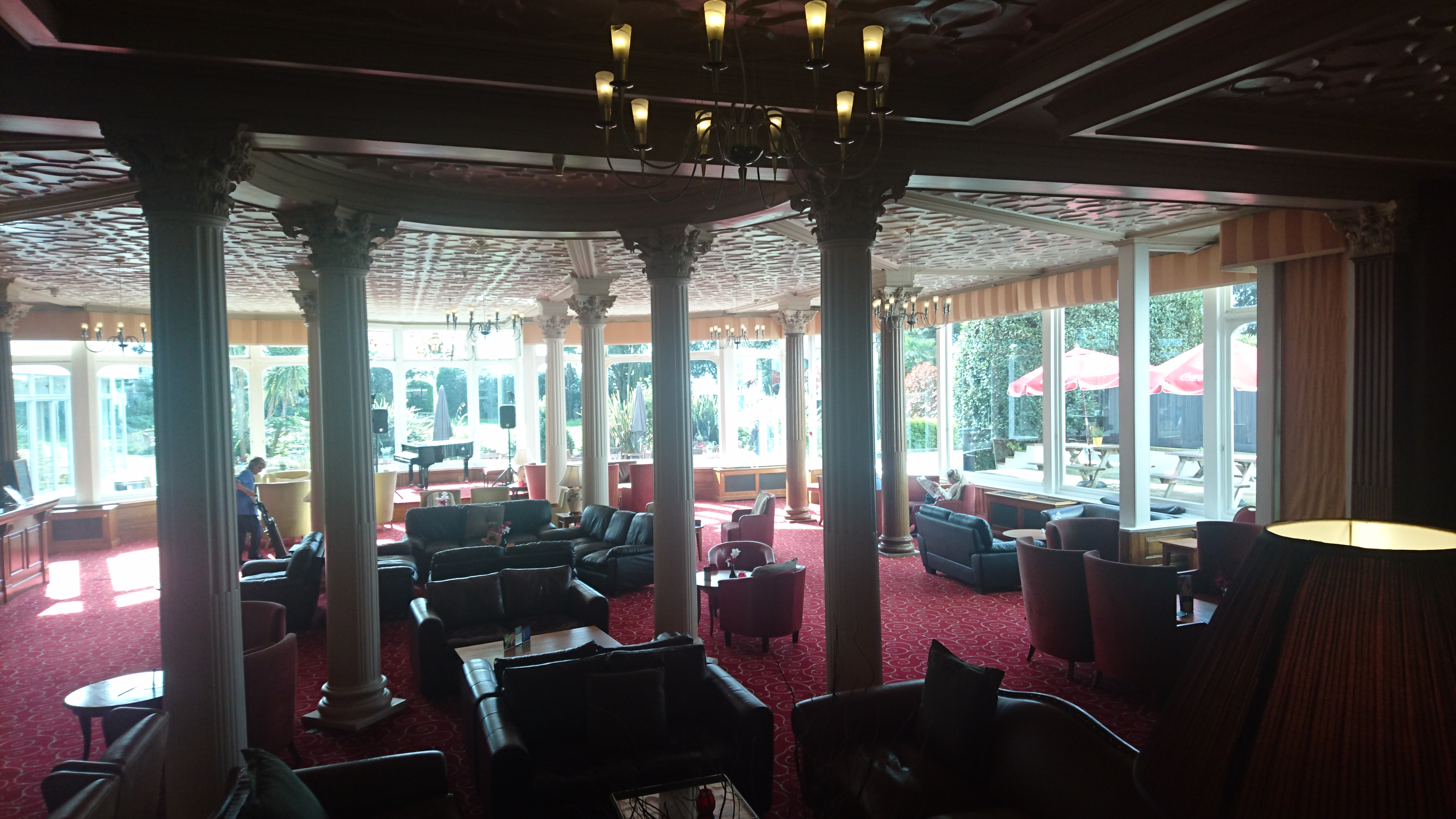

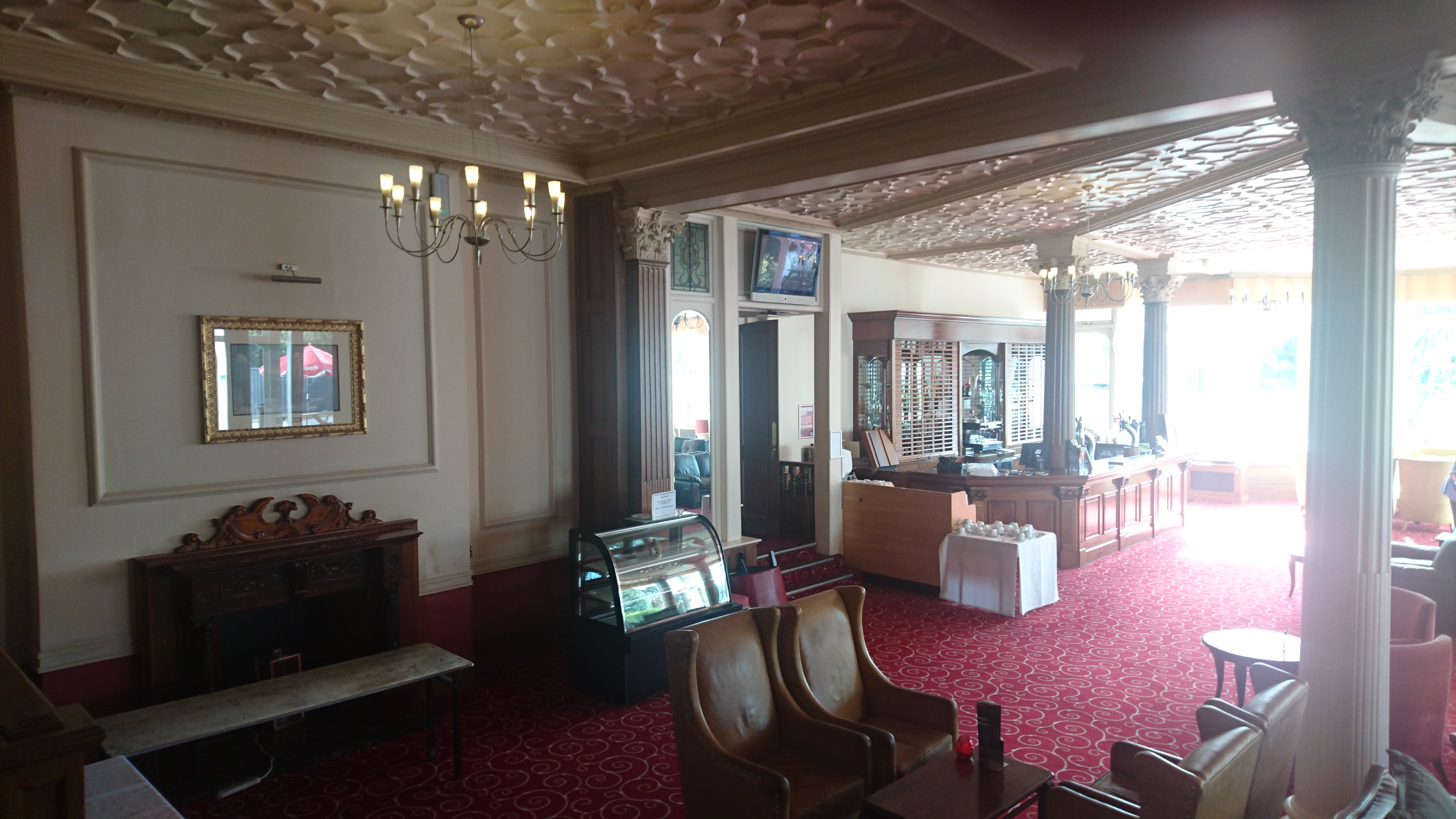

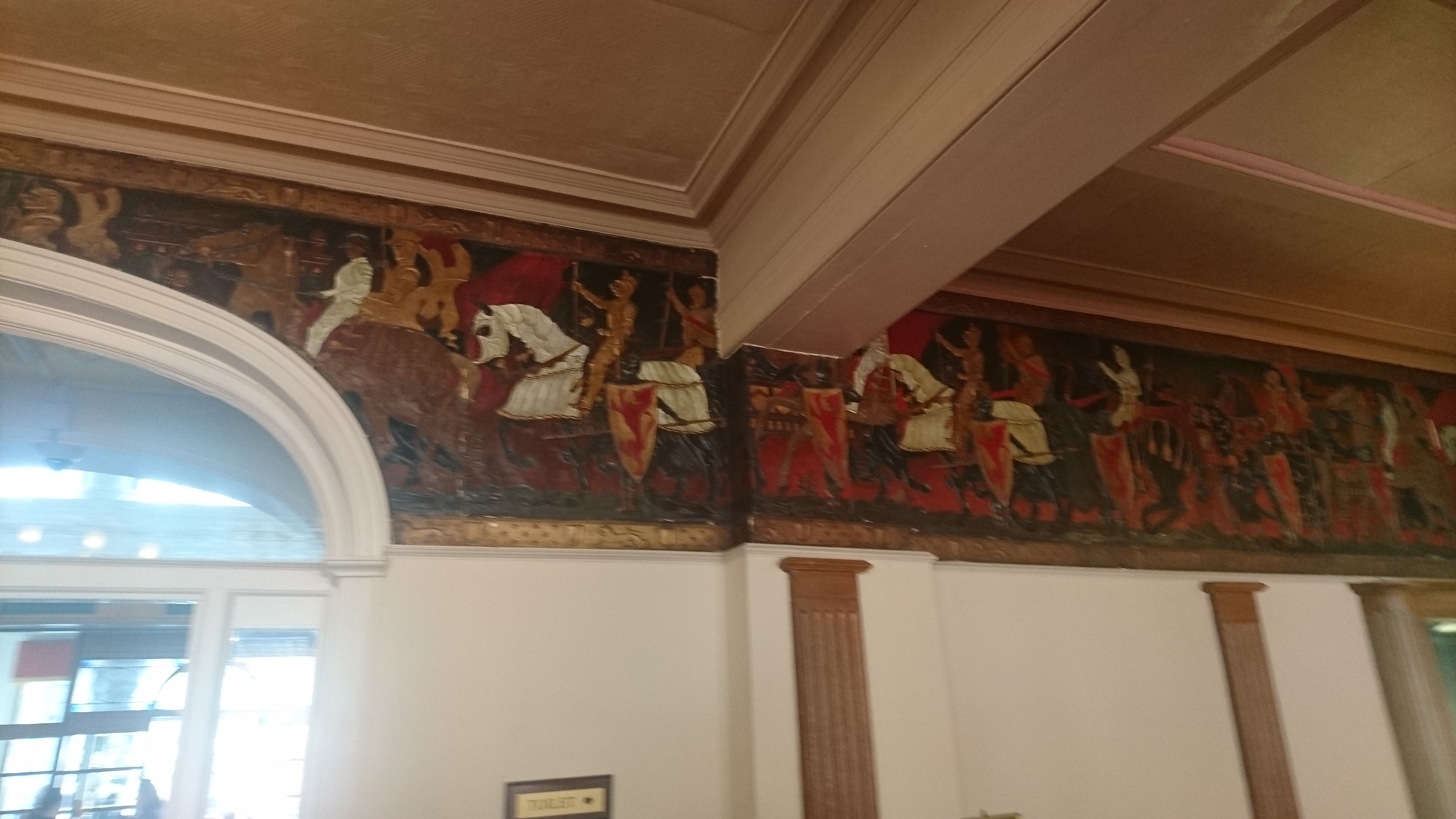

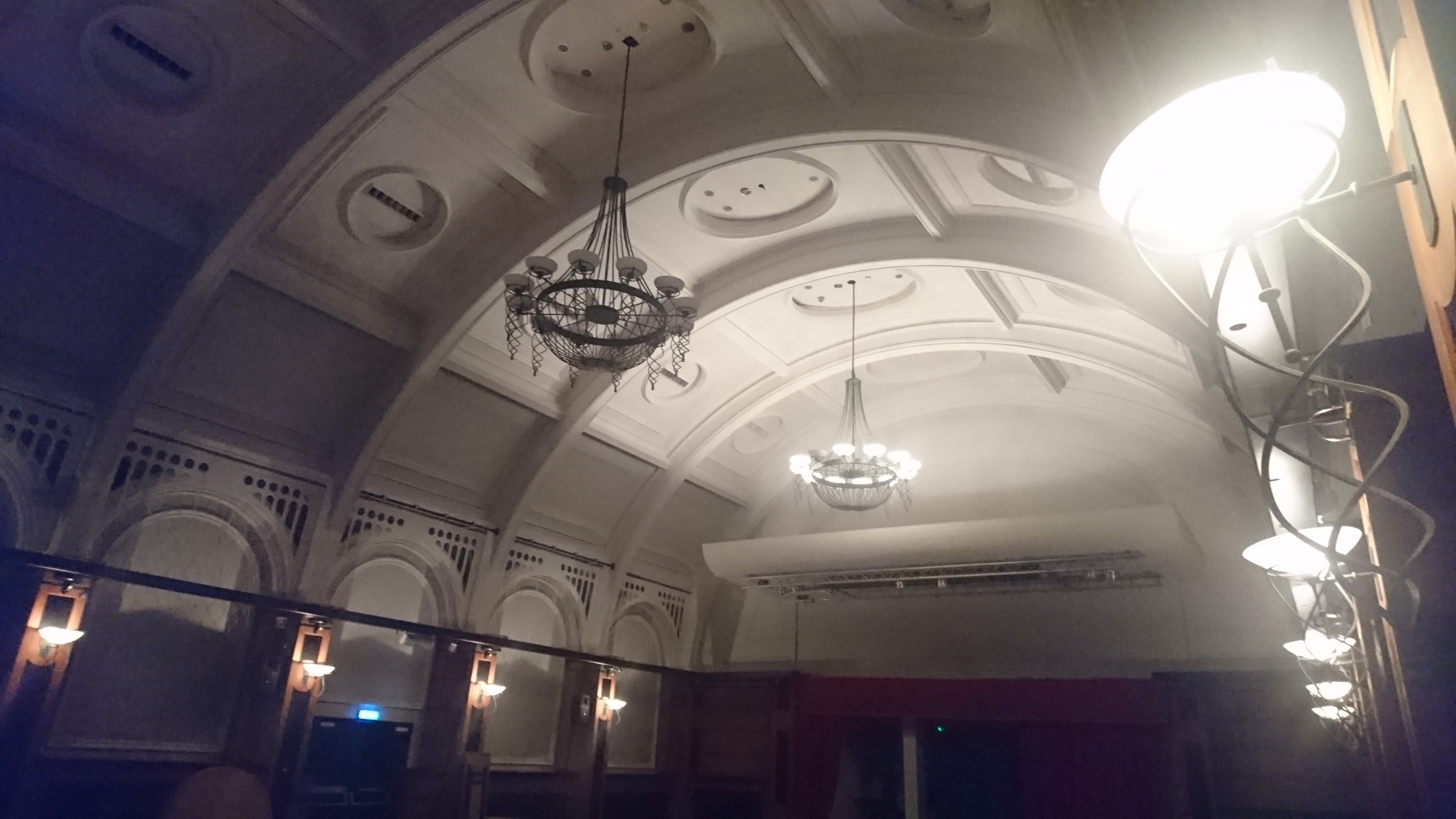

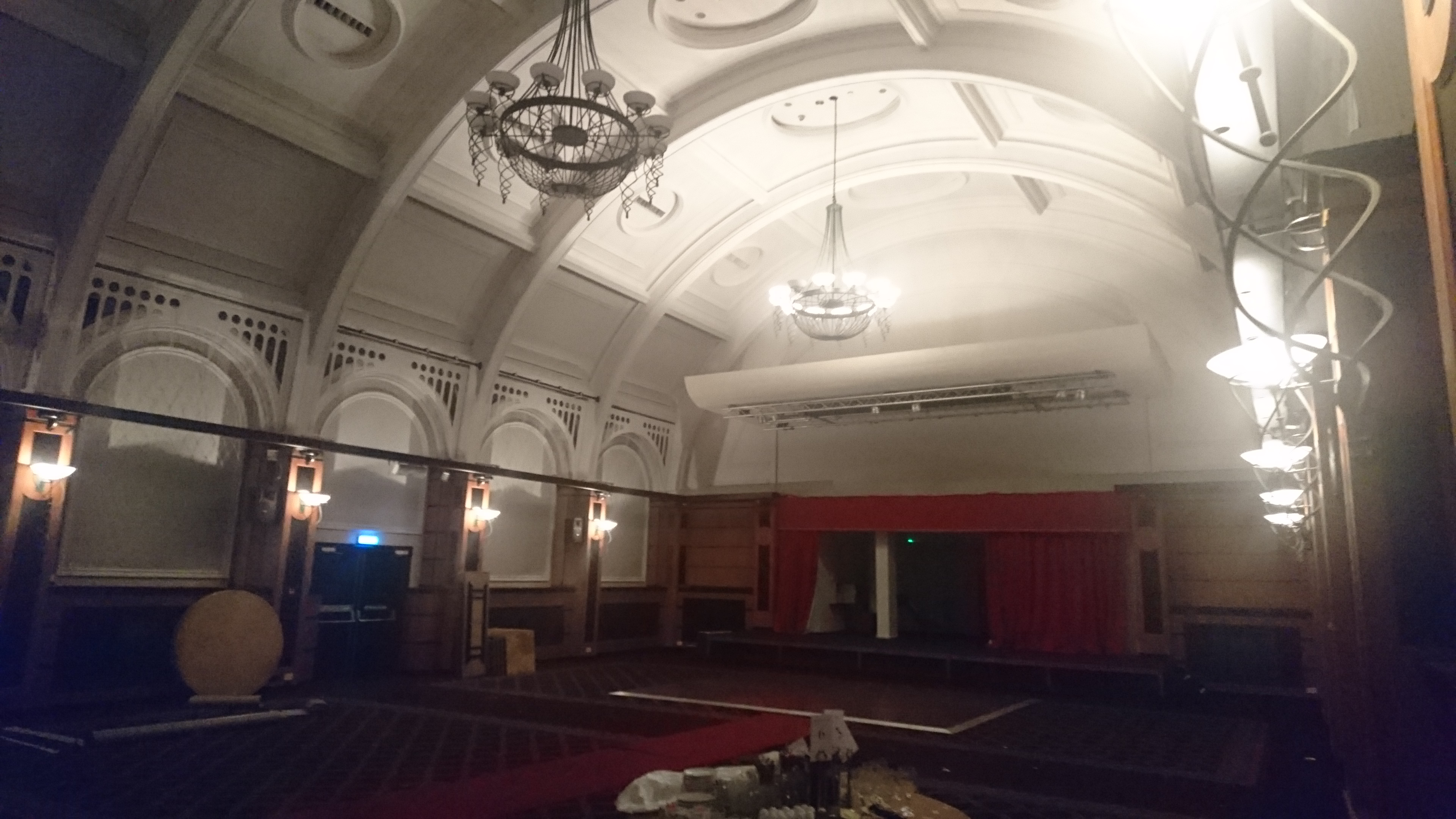

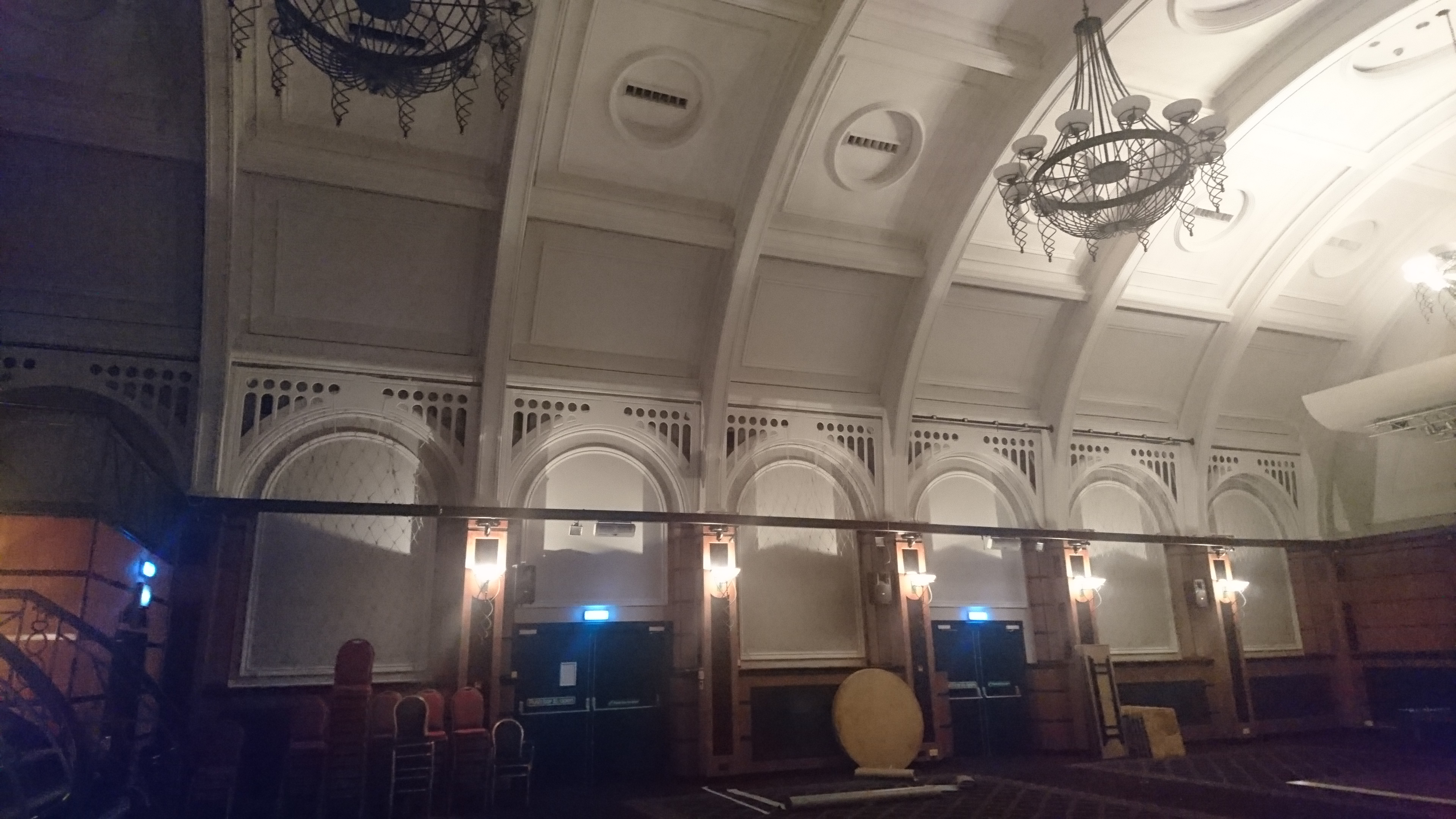

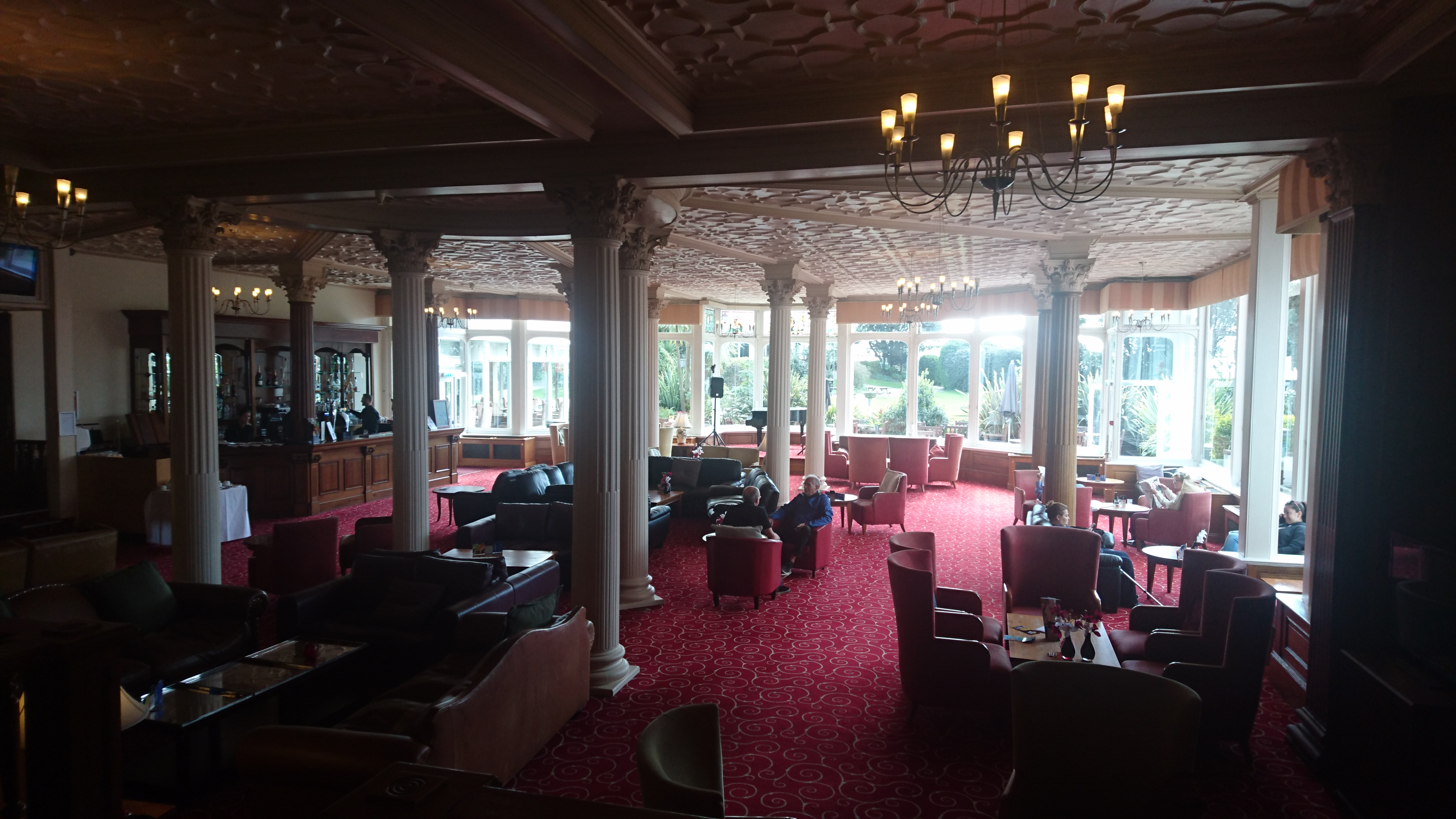

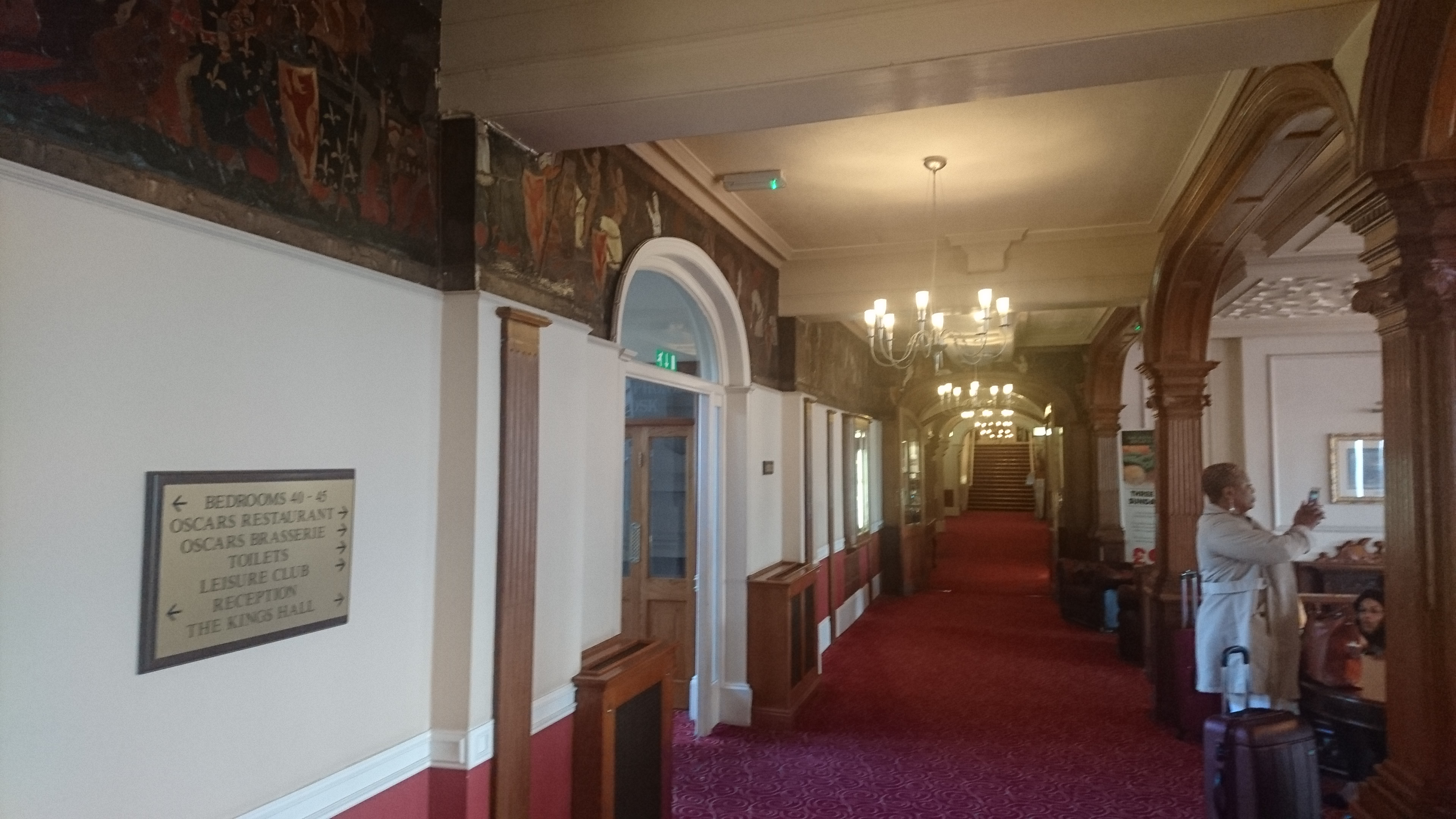

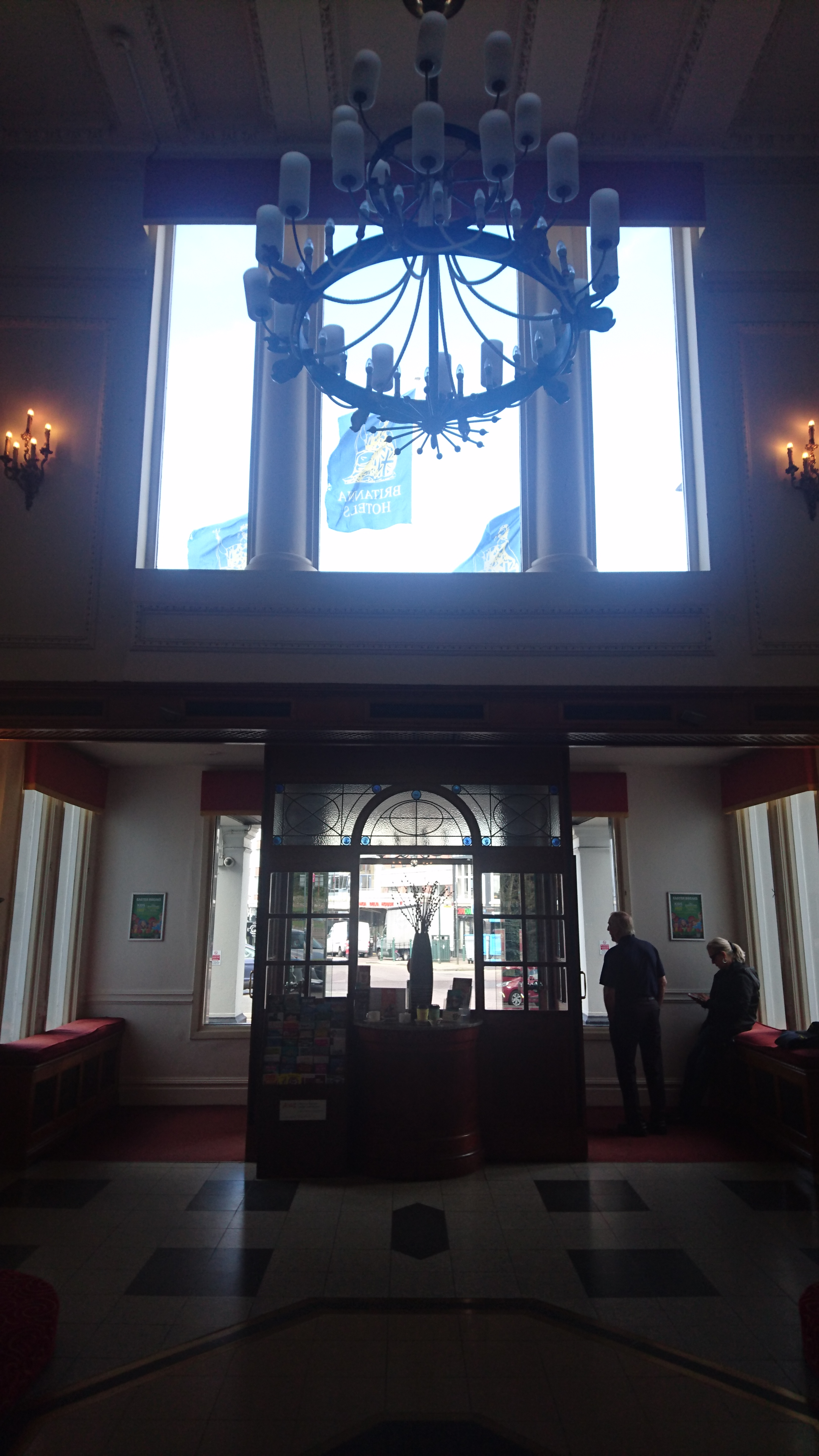

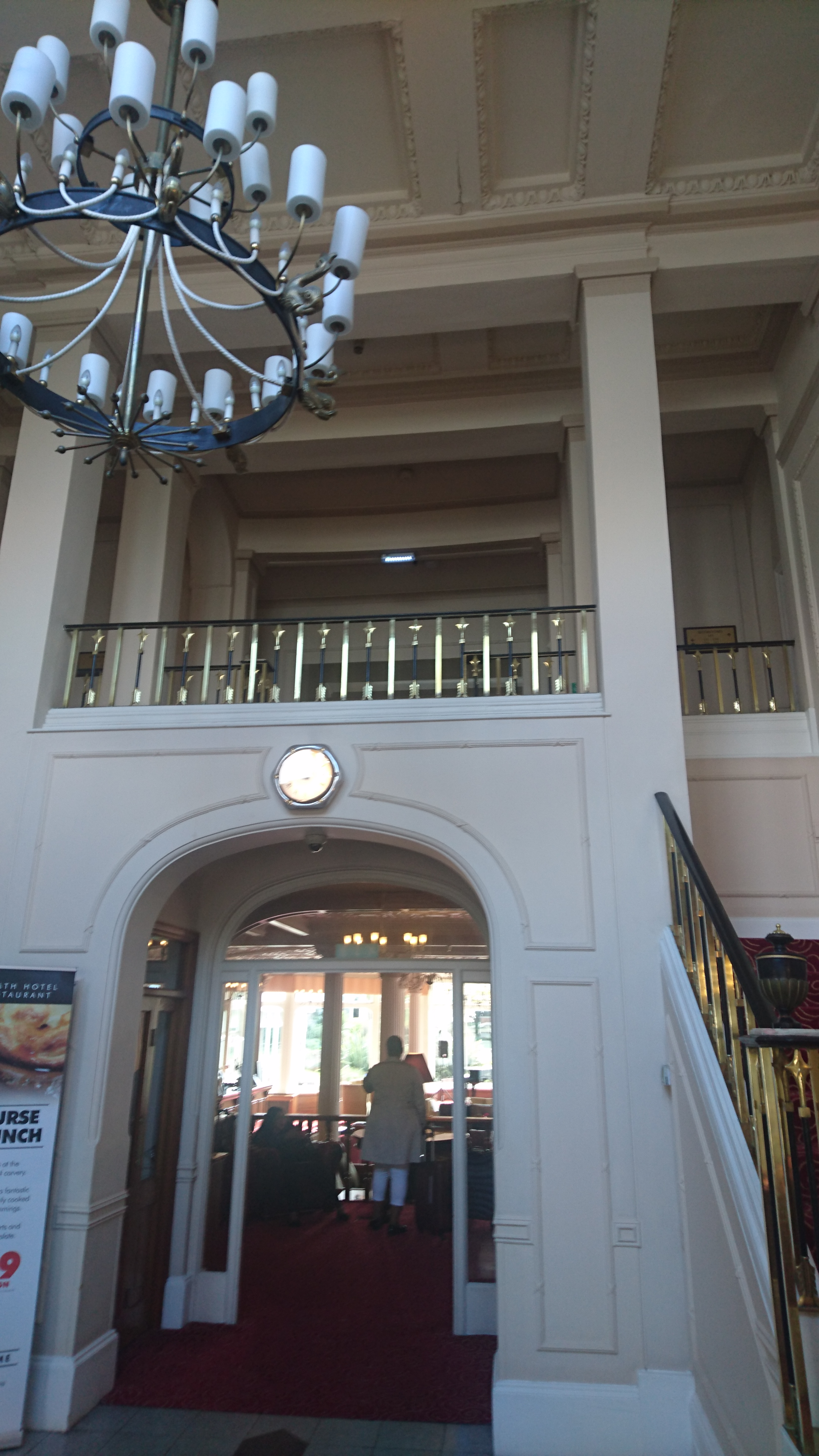

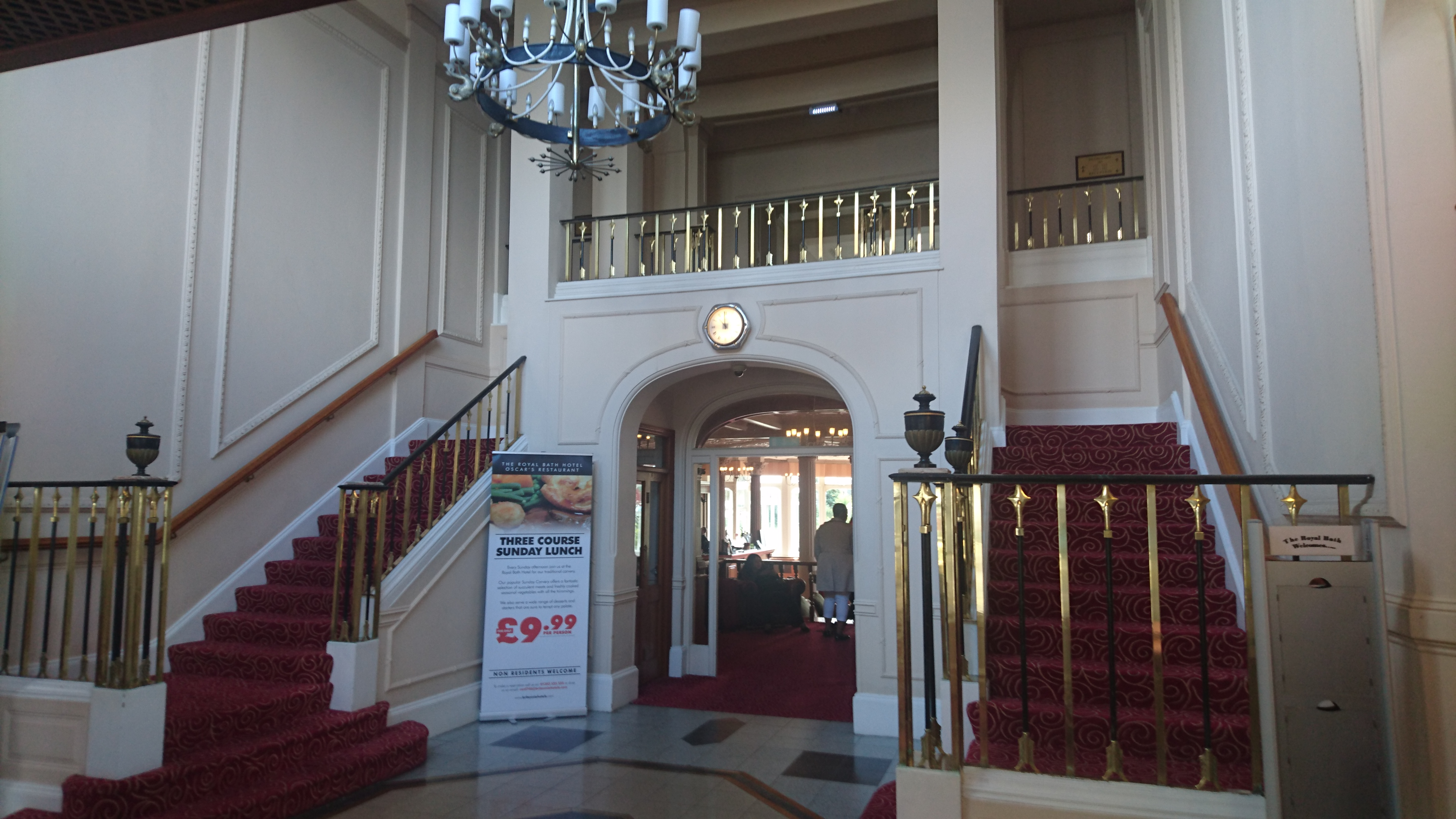

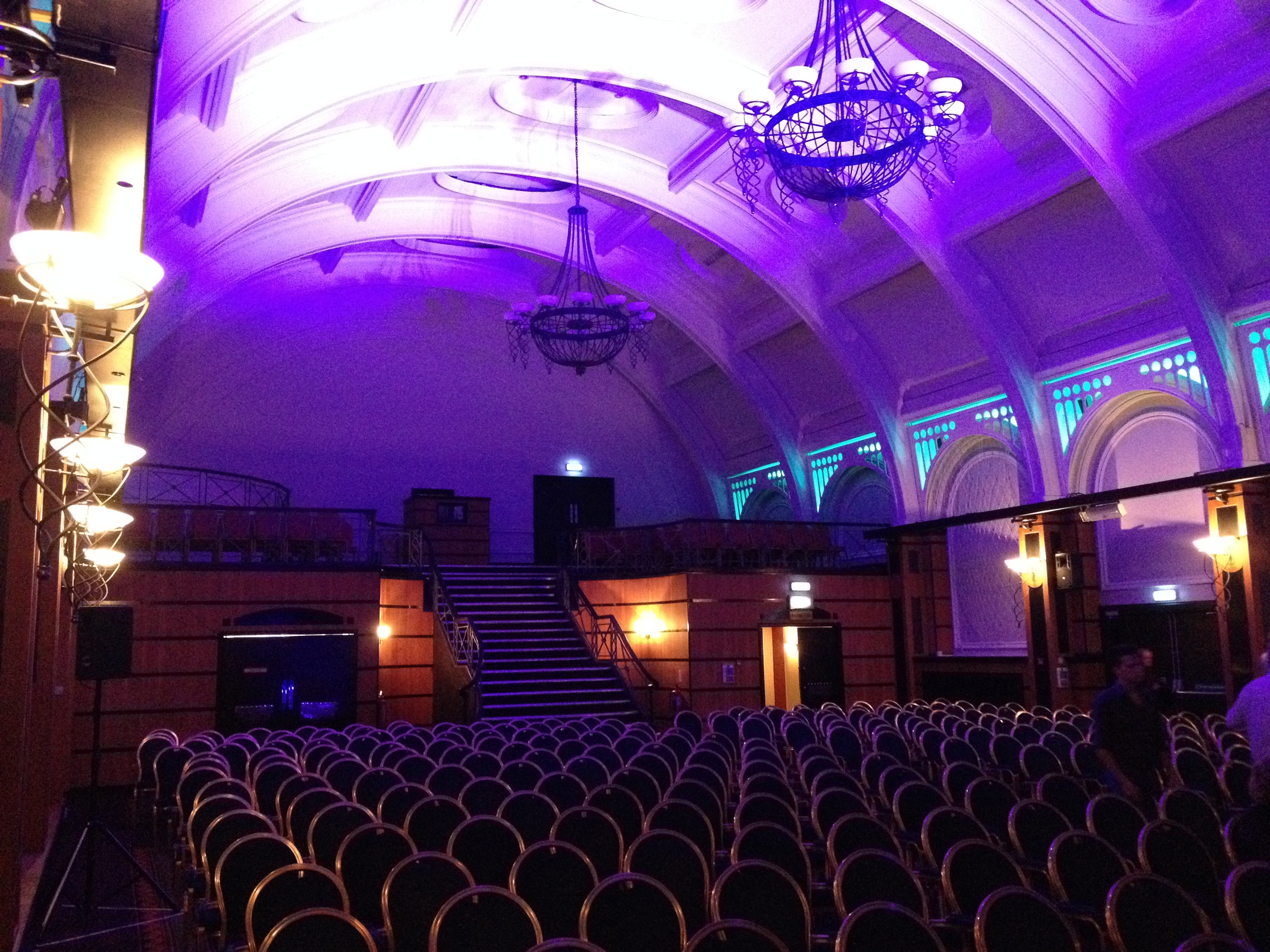

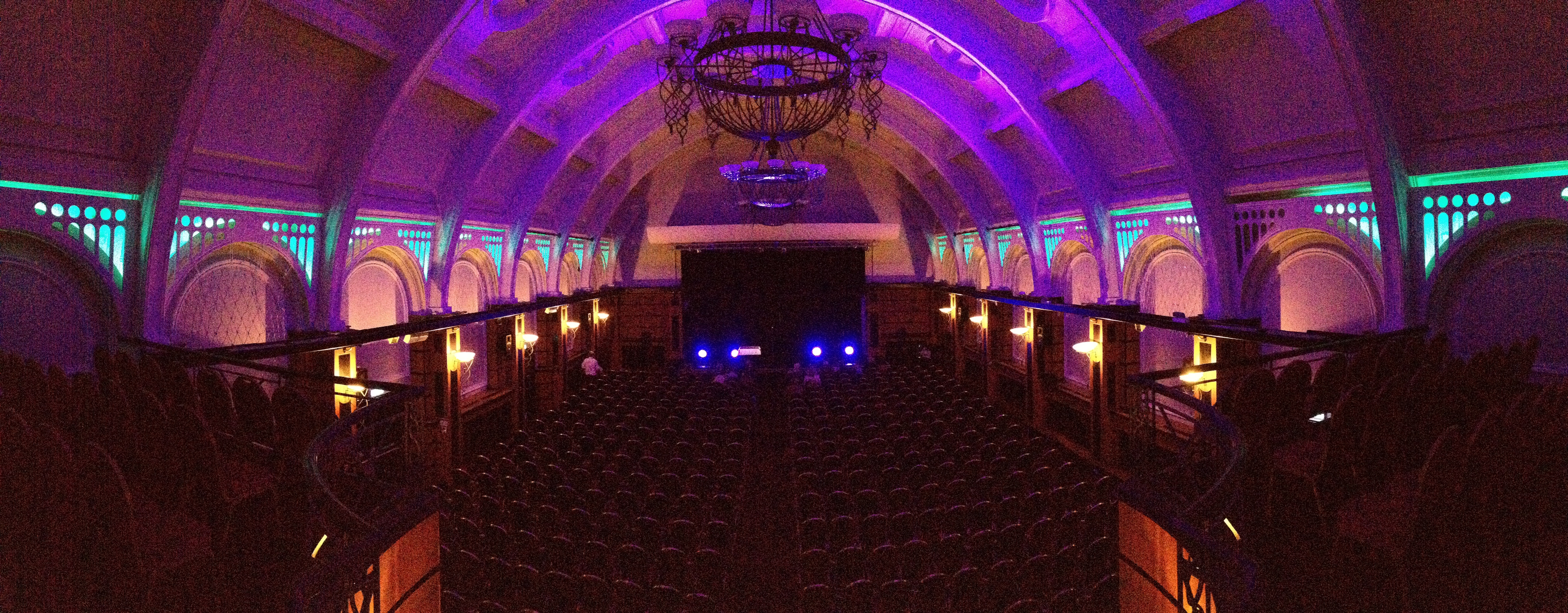

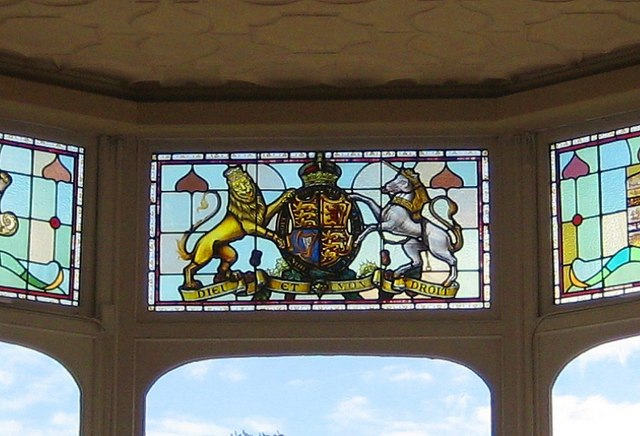

== See also ==
- List of hotels in the United Kingdom
