= Christopher Crabb Creeke =

British architect (1820–1886)

- Born: 11 March 1820; Cambridge, Cambridgeshire, England
- Died: 22 May 1886 (aged 66); Bournemouth, Hampshire now Dorset, England
- Occupation: Architect
- Projects: St Mark's School, Bournemouth (1862); Royal Bath Hotel extension (1878); First Bournemouth town survey and plan Bournemouth sewer improvements Wimborne Road Cemetery, Bournemouth

Christopher Crabb Creeke (11 March 1820 – 22 May 1886) was an architect and surveyor who was largely responsible for shaping the early development of Bournemouth.

== Early life ==
Christopher Crabb Creeke was born on 11 March 1820, in Cambridge, the son of tailor and robe maker Thomas Creeke and his first wife Elizabeth Rootham Crabb. By the time he was 20, Creeke looked set to follow his father's trade as a tailor, however he moved to London to train as an architectural draughtsman. Whilst there, he married the recently widowed Elisabeth Norwood in 1845.

== Bournemouth ==
=== Arrival ===
Creeke seems to have arrived in Bournemouth around 1850, on a commission from Mary Shelley to convert a large property at Boscombe into her seaside retreat. Shelley died before she could move in, but her son, Sir Percy Shelley, retained Creeke's services.

Bournemouth at that time was a haphazard development, where properties had been built largely at the whim of untrained landowners. There was no co-ordination of effort, and in the case of the vast Branksome Estate, the promise of development potential had led to a tangled mass of mortgages and the ruination of at least one owner. This was a situation crying out for a capable mind to solve.

=== Growth of reputation ===
Creeke, meanwhile, had decided not to return to London, a resolution determined as much perhaps by the delicate health of his wife (which had left her needing the constant care of an institution) as by Creeke's appreciation of the beauty of Bournemouth. The varied problems of Bournemouth presented him with a challenge to which he showed himself the equal. One of his first tasks was to assist in a court case that was causing problems at Branksome. Creeke used his skills to draw up a map of the vast Branksome Estate, hundreds of acres in extent, which proved useful in sorting out the wrangles over the various mortgages and charges at the estate. As a result of Creeke's work, the estate was soon up for sale and attracted some significant purchasers, such as the Talbot sisters and Charles William Packe.

Elsewhere in Bournemouth, William Clapcott Dean was on the verge of inheriting several hundred acres of land. Dean hailed from a local family of yeoman farmers. They too were suffering from crippling mortgages which were only cleared by a life insurance payout when Dean's mother died. This left Dean able to contemplate the development of his land, but he had none of the necessary training for the work and so turned to Creeke for advice.

=== Planning Bournemouth ===
Creeke was becoming invaluable to most of the major landowners in Bournemouth, but he was also aware that the ad hoc nature of the existing development had left the town in need of proper drains, water supply, roads and refuse collection. None of the private estate offices were equal to the task and there was no forum in which to co-ordinate the necessary efforts. This situation was finally resolved in 1856, when Parliament, following the due petition from the local property owners, allowed the establishment of the Bournemouth Commissioners, and empowered them to levy a local rate for the improvement of the town and the construction of a pier. Unsurprisingly, Creeke was appointed as the surveyor by the Commissioners, and so began a long period during which Creeke advised both the land owners and the Commissioners. What emerged was his conception of Bournemouth as a town of meandering roads and large villas in spacious plots that shaped the development of the town.

=== Later life ===
By 1861, Creeke's younger half-sister Anna had moved to Bournemouth where she appears to have acted as housekeeper and secretary to her brother. Creeke lived in several houses that he had designed himself. His wife Elisabeth died early in 1881 in Fleet, Lincolnshire. Creeke survived her by five years, and died in 1886. He was buried in the Wimborne Road Cemetery, Bournemouth, which had been laid out according to his plans. His crusader type grave is close to the chapel that he designed for the cemetery, and which is now a listed building.

== Legacy ==
A Wetherspoons pub named The Christopher Creeke opened in the Lansdowne area of Bournemouth on 21 August 2009 and closed on 3 April 2022.

== Notable works ==
- St Luke's Church, Winton (1898)
- Royal Bath Hotel extenstion (1878)
- St Mark's Church of England Primary School (1862)
