= Colsons =

Former department store in Exeter, England

Coordinates: 50.7239°N 3.5302°W

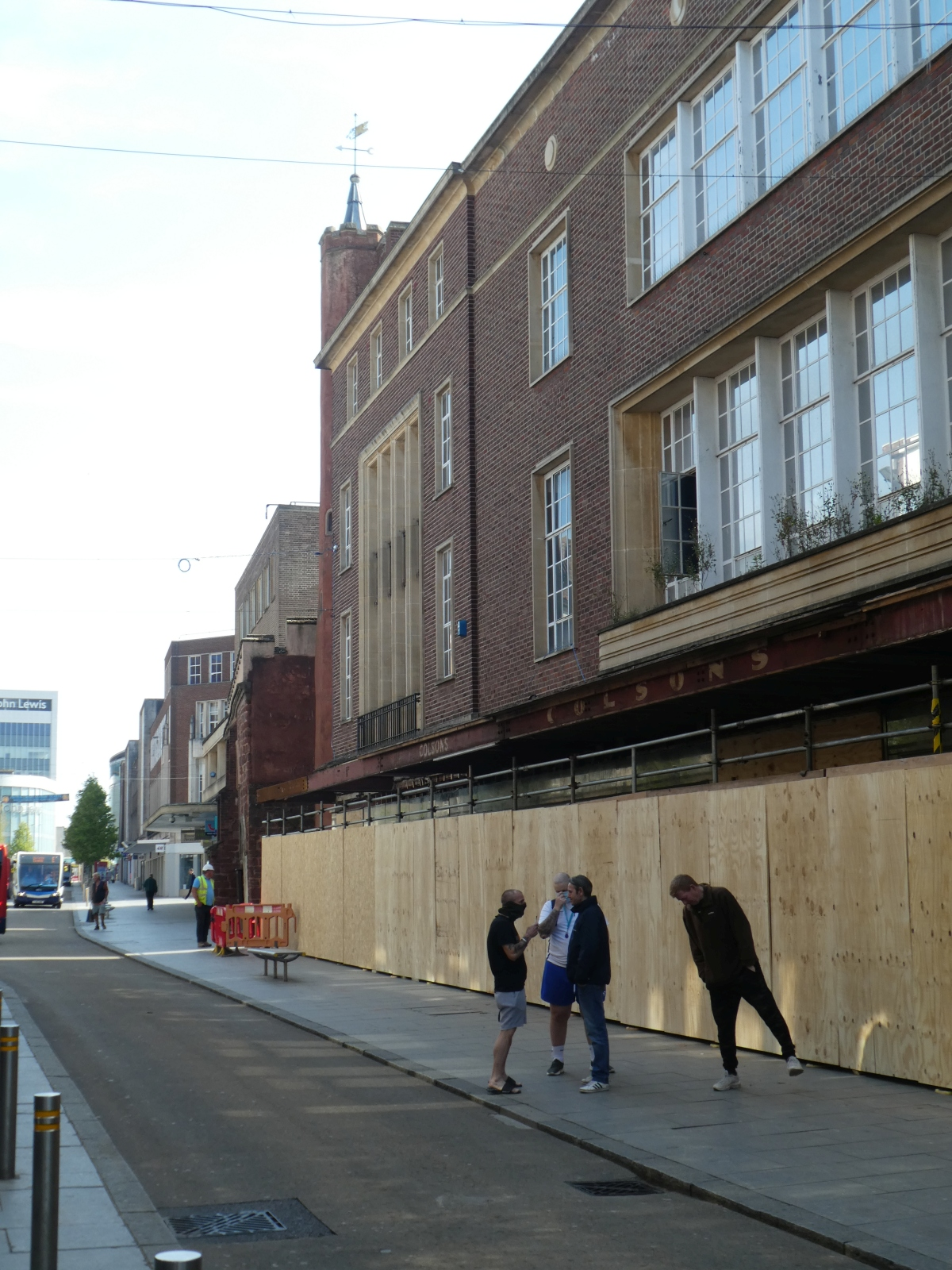
- Colsons building during renovation to a hotel, with original 'Colsons' sign still visible
- Industry: Retail
- Founded: 3 August 1789; 236 years ago
- Founder: Mrs Colson
- Defunct: 2019
- Successors: Dingles; House of Fraser
- Headquarters: Exeter, United Kingdom

Colsons, later Dingles and House of Fraser, was a department store located in Exeter, Devon, England. Located on the High Street, the store was founded in 1792, then expanded after damage in the Second World War. It was later acquired by House of Fraser and grouped with Plymouth-based Dingles, taking their name, before becoming House of Fraser. The store closed in 2019, along with a number of other House of Fraser stores during financial difficulties at the group.

The site was derelict for a number of years, before being renovated during 2022 by IHG Hotels & Resorts as the Hotel Indigo Exeter, including a restaurant named "Colson's" in recognition of the history of the building. The refurbishment cost £40m to convert into a hotel, and two years later was put up for sale at £24m.

== History ==
=== Foundation ===
Colsons was established in 1789 by Mrs Colson, taking over the Millinery and Linen business of a Mrs Coles, along with her "Childbed Linen Warehouse" opposite Gandy's Lane (now Gandy Street) on Exeter High Street. Mrs Cole announced her retirement and sale on 27 July 1789, with the newly named Colsons opening on 3 August the same year. At opening the store boasted drapery, haberdashery, millinery, and a selection of teas.

Mrs Colson was the widower of a member of King George's diplomatic service.

Mrs Colson's son John Worthy Colson joined the business and in 1829 he took a partner into the business. The new business was called Colson & Spark, however the partnership did not last long and ended in 1832.

By 1870 the business again entered into a partnership, becoming Colson and Gates.

In 1887, George Colson took over the running of the business, and in 1889 the partnership broke down, with the business reverting to the name Colson & Co.

Also in 1887, the company provided its entire stock of calico to help wrap the dead bodies from the Exeter Theatre Royal fire, which had killed 186.

=== Colsons leaves family ownership ===
In 1913, George sold the business to a local JP, Sir Edgar Plummer who ran the store for 12 years. In 1925, the store was purchased from Sir Edgar by Brights, a department store located in Bournemouth, with the business trading under the brand of "Colson and Co".

During the Second World War, the store was damaged by bombing raids, but parts of the store had been saved and continued to operate. After the war the business had plans drawn up to refurbish the buildings but by 1953, new plans were drawn up by architects F W Beech & E Curnow Cookes to rebuild the whole store in nine phases, to allow for business to continue. When the new store was completed it had increased in size taking in neighbouring stores, Bellmans and Wymans.

The business continued to operate as part of Brights until 1960, when Brights were purchased by rival Bournemouth based department store group J J Allen. Under J J Allen ownership, the business added the J J Allen stores Maryon Fashion and Chanelle as departments.

Also in 1960, Colsons opened a furniture warehouse at 22 Cathedral Yard (a Michael Spiers shop as of 2022), a short distance from the main store opposite the cathedral.

By 1966 the store had its own Food Hall.

=== Purchase by House of Fraser ===
In 1969, J J Allen were purchased by House of Fraser for £5.3 million and merged into its Harrods group. This did not last long, as in 1971 House of Fraser purchased the west country department store group E Dingle & Co and all the House of Fraser stores in the west country were transferred into the new Dingles division and by 1974 were re-branded under the Dingles name.

Following the construction of the new Princesshay shopping centre nearby, which included rival department-store chain Debenhams in 2007, House of Fraser invested £1.5m in upgrading the Exeter store, which reopened branded as House of Fraser, dropping the Dingles name.

=== Closure ===
In 2018, House of Fraser group was in significant financial difficulty, entering into a company voluntary arrangement. The group announced the closure of 31 stores in June 2018, but Exeter was not amongst those announced for closure. In October of that year, it was confirmed that the Exeter store would close in January 2019.

In January 2019, there were hopes that the store had been saved, with it being reported that the store would not close, with closing down sale signage removed from the store and restocking happening. However, the closing down signage returned in August 2019, and the store finally closed on the 2nd November 2019.
