= Brights (department store) =

Former department store group

Brights was a small group of department stores based in the South and South West of England.

== History ==
Frederick John Bright was born in Castle Hedingham, in Essex in 1832 and went onto work for the London Missionary Service in India. During his time in India, his son Percy was born by his wife June in 1864. They returned to England due to the ill health of Frederick's mother, firstly moving to Poole, then Lymington where Frederick ran a small haberdashery business for 6 years.

In 1871 he opened a store at no. 9 Bournemouth Arcade selling needlework and Berlin Wool, before quickly adding a bookshop and a printers which by 1894 were located at 8-11 Bournemouth Arcade. From 1886 F J Brights printed the Brights Illustrated Guide to Bournemouth. The store expanded again by adding a new stationery and fancy goods department at 14-26 Old Christchurch Road, and moving into the new art of photography.

The business continued to be run by Frederick until the 1920s when his son Percy took over. In 1923 he took over Flora Ltd, a Gown & Millinery shop in Southsea renaming the business Brights (Southsea) Ltd, however by 1928 the business was no longer operational. He sold off the photography and printing business in 1924 to partner Frank Higby Oliver. In 1925 he purchased the Exeter department store Colson & Co. rebranding the store Colsons of Exeter, and in 1932 bought the Clifton department store of Bobby & Co. In 1941, however, Percy was hit by a coal lorry and died at the age of 78.

After the war the Exeter store was rebuilt in 1953 and the business continued to operate as an independent company until 1960 when J J Allen took over the Brights brand. The Brights brand continued to be operated after the purchase of J J Allen by House of Fraser in 1969, however after the purchase of Dingles by House of Fraser in 1971, the Brights and Colsons brands were dropped and replaced by Dingles in 1972.
