= Mayor of Bournemouth =

The following were mayors of Bournemouth, Dorset, England, Before 1974, Bournemouth was in the county of Hampshire:

Year	Name	Notes
1890	Thomas James Hankinson	First mayor of Bournemouth
1891	Edward Wise Rebbeck	
1892	Henry Newlyn	
1893	George Merriman Hirons	
1894	Merton Russell-Cotes	
1895	Henry Newlyn	
1896	James Atkinson Hosker	
1897	William Mattocks	
1898	William Hoare	
1899	John Clark Webber	
1900	George Joseph Lawson	
1901	George Frost	
1902	John Elmes Beale	
1903	John Elmes Beale	
1904	John Elmes Beale	
1905	John Aldridge Parsons	
1906	John Aldridge Parsons	
1907	George Edward Bridge	
1908	George Edward Bridge	
1909	George Edward Bridge	
1910	Charles Hunt	
1911	Henry Symour McCalmont Hill	
1912	Henry Symour McCalmont Hill	
1913	Henry Symour McCalmont Hill	
1914	James Druitt	
1915	Henry Robson	
1916	Henry Robson	
1917	Edward Ernest Bishop	
1918	Edward Ernest Bishop	
1919	Charles Henry Cartwright	
1920	Charles Henry Cartwright	
1921	Charles Henry Cartwright	
1922	Charles Henry Cartwright	
1923	Thomas Bodley Scott	Served part of the year, before dying whilst in office
1923	Frederick Skinner Mate	Took over partway through the year, following his predecessor's death
1924	Frederick Skinner Mate	Took over partway through the year, following his predecessor's death
1925	Harry John Thwaites	
1926	Harry John Thwaites	
1927	Harry John Thwaites	
1928	Sir Charles Henry Cartwright	Fourth term in office
1929	Percy May Bright	
1930	Percy May Bright	
1931	Percy May Bright	
1932	John Robert Edgecombe	
1933	John Robert Edgecombe	
1934	John Robert Edgecombe	
1935	Henry George Harris	
1936	Thomas Victor Rebbeck	
1937	John Bennett Cole Beale	
1938	Isaac William Dickinson	
1939	Percy Wilfred Tom Hayward	
1940	Alfred Herbert Little	
1941	John James Empson	
1942	Frank Bassett Summerbee	
1943	Jabez Richards	
1944	Harry Charles Brown	
1945	Robert Charles Henry Old	
1946	John William Moore	
1947	John William Moore	
1948	John William Moore	
1949	John William Moore	
1949	James Hugh Turner	
1950	Sydney Arthur Thomson	
1951	Frank James McInnes	
1952	Harold Alfred Benwell	
1953	Harry Percival Evelyn Mears	
1954	George Smith	
1955	Donald Nelson Willoughby	
1956	Philip George Templeman	
1957	William James Whitelock	
1958	Henry Brown	
1959	Louis Victor Barney	
1960	Bessie Bicknell	Bournemouth's first female mayor
1961	Deric Sidney Scott	
1962	Alban Ernest James Adams	
1963	Harry Percival Evelyn Mears	
1964	Harold Alfred Benwell	Both served part of the year
1964	Harry Percival Evelyn Mears	Both served part of the year
1965	Reginald Sylvester Morris	
1966	Philip Gordon Whitelegg	
1967	Frank Alfred William Purdy	
1968	Michael William Green	
1969	Basil Ewart David Beckett	
1970	Edwin Alfred Lane	
1971	Richard Ayton Judd	
1972	Leslie Mary Swetenham	
1973	Major Bertram George Dillon	Served until 30 March 1974
1974	Major Bertram George Dillon	Served until 30 March 1974
1974	William Frederick Forman	Served between 1 April to 24 May 1974
1974	William Thomas Roy Turner	
1975	George Henry Masters	
1976	Arthur William Patton	
1977	Dr Gabriel Vivian Jaffé	
1978	Frank Holmes Beale	
1979	Patrick Walter Kelleway	
1980	Ernest Norman Day	
1981	Gordon Roy Anstee	
1982	Sheila Elizabeth McQueen	
1983	Jeanne Hilda Curtis	
1984	Michael Harold Filer	
1985	Robert Frederick Wotton	
1986	Dan Crone	
1987	Barbara R. Siberry	
1988	Jacqueline Craven Harris	
1989	Harry Bostock	
1990	Wycliffe H Coe	
1991	Lionel F Bennett	
1992	Margaret Hogarth	
1993	Ronald Whittaker	
1994	Dr John Millward	
1995	Pamela I Harris	
1996	Jean Moore	
1997	N/A	Unitary Authority
1997	Peter Brushett	
1998	Keith Rawlings	
1999	Hampton James Courtney	
2000	Ben Grower	
2001	Douglas Eyre	
2002	David Baldwin	
2003	Anne Ray	
2004	Emily Morrell-Cross	
2005	Ted Taylor	
2006	Bob Chapman	
2007	Anne Filer	
2008	Stephen Chappell	
2009	Beryl Baxter	
2010	Barry Goldbart	First Reform Jewish Mayor
2011	Chris Rochester	
2012	Phil Stanley-Watts	Bournemouth’s 100th Mayor
2013	Dr Rodney Cooper	
2014	Chris Mayne	
2015	John Adams	
2016	Eddie Coope	
2017	Lawrence Williams	
2018	Derek Borthwick	
2019	Susan Phillips	Due to the Covid-19 pandemic the mayoral term was given a year’s extension
2020	Susan Phillips	Due to the Covid-19 pandemic the mayoral term was given a year’s extension
2021	David Kelsey	
2022	Robert (Bob) Lawton	
2023	Anne Filer	
