= Wimborne Road Cemetery, Bournemouth =

Historic cemetery in Dorset, England

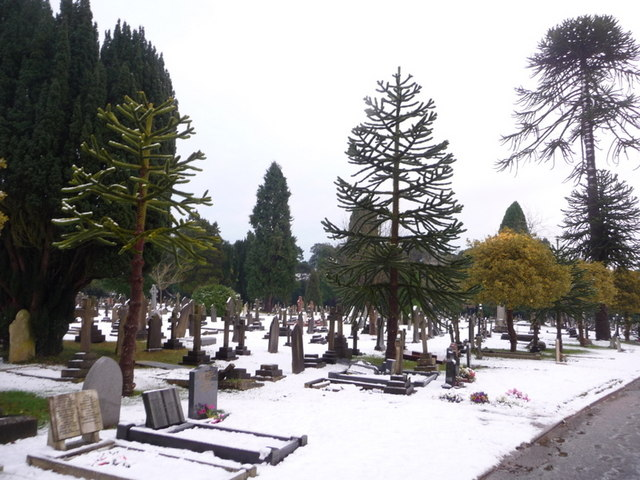
- Wimborne Road Cemetery
- Interactive map of Wimborne Road Cemetery, Bournemouth

Details
- Established: 1878
- Location: Wimborne Road, Bournemouth
- Country: UK
- Coordinates: 50°44′03″N 1°52′23″W
- Type: Cemetery
- Find a Grave: Wimborne Road Cemetery, Bournemouth

The Wimborne Road Cemetery is located at Wimborne Road, Bournemouth. It is grade II listed with Historic England. The cemetery was opened in 1878 and laid out by the architect Christopher Crabb Creeke. St Augustin's Church stands across the road from the cemetery.

Cemetery Junction is a major intersection of the A347 road.

The cemetery contains the war graves of 48 Commonwealth service personnel of World War I and 38 of World War II.

== Notable interments ==
- Frederick Abberline (1843–1929), British police Chief Inspector and detective
- Sir Evelyn Baring, 1st Earl of Cromer (1841–1917), statesman
- Guy Boothby (1867–1905), author
- William Campbell, (1841-1921), missionary
- Christopher Crabb Creeke (1820–1886), architect
- John Nelson Darby (1800–1882), founder of the Plymouth Brethren
- Antonia Forest (1915–2003), author
- Staff Surgeon RN William Job Maillard (1863–1903), Victoria Cross recipient in 1898 Occupation of Crete
- Captain Keith Muspratt (1897-1918), World War I flying ace
- Francis Mawson Rattenbury (1867–1935), architect. His widow, Alma (1897/1898-1935), songwriter, implicated in his murder, is buried in a separate and unmarked grave.
