= William Crabtree (architect) =

English architect

William Crabtree (1905–1991) was an English architect. His reputation rests mainly on his Peter Jones department store, Sloane Square and King's Road, Chelsea, London (1932–37), designed for John Spedan Lewis (1885–1963), the founder of the John Lewis Partnership.

== Other works ==
Crabtree worked in collaboration with Slater & Moberly, with Professor Sir Charles Herbert Reilly (1874−1948), Crabtree's former mentor at Liverpool University, as a consultant. It was one of the first 20th century uses of the glass curtain-wall in England, and was influenced by the work of Erich Mendelsohn, the Prussian architect, who lectured twice at Liverpool University. Reilly and Crabtree also collaborated on the John Lewis department store in Oxford Street, London.

He subsequently worked with Sir (Leslie) Patrick Abercrombie on the reconstruction of Plymouth and Southampton after the 1939–45 war, and designed several buildings in the new post-war town of Basildon, and Spring Hills Tower (and surrounding houses) in Harlow, Essex (1964).

Crabtree's other work in London included an extension to Sir William Collins Comprehensive School (named after William Job Collins) in Charrington Street, Somers Town, Camden, NW1, later renamed South Camden Community School (SCCS), which was officially opened in 1961. The school was re-developed in 2012 and renamed Regent High School (RHS).
