= Peter Rees Jones =

Peter Rees Jones (1843 – 1905) was the founder of the Peter Jones department store in Sloane Square, London, England.

== Biography ==
Jones was born in Newcastle Emlyn, Carmarthenshire, Wales, the son of Thomas Jones, a hat maker, and at the age of 24, after serving an apprenticeship with a draper in Carmarthen, and with £14 savings in his pocket, he moved to London. Jones initially took a position with a draper in Hackney before moving on to apprenticeships with William Tarn in Newington and then Stagg & Mantle at Leicester Square. He opened his own small draper's shop, ‘Peter Jones' in 1871 on Marlborough Road (now Draycott Avenue), Chelsea.

Six years later, in 1877, he moved to numbers 4 and 6 Kings Road — on the site of the present shop. Chelsea, at that time, was growing in affluence and the business flourished, quickly expanding into 26 neighbouring properties before being rebuilt in the 1880s.

The original premises were replaced with a five storey building of red brick and red Mansfield stone under a green slate roof. Completed in 1890, the new building was lavishly appointed with marble pillars, thick carpets and palms. The staff quarters included a library, piano, and two billiard tables, making it a well-equipped space. Notably, the shop earned the distinction of being the first in England to be illuminated entirely by electricity. During this period, the business identified itself as 'silk mercers, costumiers, and complete house furnishers.'

The Symons Street frontage of the 1890 building is still in existence, forming part of the present shop.

Peter Jones was floated on the stock market in 1900 by which time the business employed over 300 people. In 1902, however, the company made the mistake of buying up cheap bankrupt stock and together with a new policy of frequent sales, weakened the business.

On 1 September 1905, The West Middlesex Advertiser recorded that ‘..Mr Peter Jones, the founder of the great drapery emporium at Sloane Square.. who was 62 years of age, died peacefully in his sleep — a quiet ending to one of the most strenuous and remarkable careers which the metropolis presents'.

The Sloane Square business was purchased by John Lewis, founder of the eponymous Oxford Street store, after his death. Unlike most other stores owned by the company, which are now branded John Lewis (Bainbridge, Heelas etc.), Peter Jones has retained its original name.
