= John William Yerbury =

British Indian army officer

- Born: 30 March 1847; Saharanpur, Ambala, India
- Died: 10 November 1927 (aged 80); England
- Education: Royal Military Academy
- Relatives: John Henry Wood (cousin)
- Military career
- Branch: Royal Artillery
- Service years: 1868-1892
- Rank: Lieutenant Colonel

John William Yerbury (30 March 1847 – 10 November 1927) was a British Indian army officer and a naturalist. He collected birds, insects, reptiles, and mollusc specimens during his service across British India, which were sent to the British Museum (Natural History). Numerous species were described in his collections and several were named after him.

== Life and work ==
Yerbury was born near Saharanpur, Ambala, where his namesake father Major Yerbury (1804-1858), posted with the 3rd Light Dragoons, was travelling. His mother Emma nee Webb, was travelling on elephant back at the time of his birth according to a family story. The family returned to England around 1854 and lived at Belcombe Court in Bradford-on-Avon. After the death of his father, Yerbury went to Wellington College and in 1862 to Dr William Bridgman's Woolwich Common school.

He enrolled at the Royal Military Academy in 1865 and was a posted Lieutenant in the Royal Artillery in 1868. He served in India and Yemen, with his last years of service spent in Sri Lanka. In his spare time he studied natural history, collecting specimens and sending them to specialists. He did not have a private collection, but sent nearly all his specimens to the British Museum. He retired as a Lieutenant Colonel in 1892 and returned to England. Once in 1894 and twice in April 1896, he visited Ethel Frances Chawner and encouraged her and her brother's interest in entomology, gifting her a box of Hymenoptera.

He made a long sea trip in 1887 from India to England and made yet another trip to Aden in 1895. He lived in London and gave his mailing address as the Army and Navy Club in Pall Mall. He continued his natural history collections in Britain and Europe until around 1914, after the death of his friend Dora Isaac and of his friend and cousin John Henry Wood. He was a member of the Entomological Society from 1888. His eyesight began to fail from around 1910 and this may have contributed to an accident in which he was hit by a taxi leading to injuries and a premature death. Yerbury exonerated the driver of the cab.

He collected across taxa. Most of his collections are now in the Natural History Museum in London.

== Taxon named in his honor ==
From the molluscs that he collected, several were described as new and named after him by E. A. Smith in 1891 including:

- Cerithium yerburyi,
- Strombus yerburyi,
- Ischnochiton yerburyi, and
- Cytherea yerburyi.

In addition:

- Hemidactylus yerburii J. Anderson, 1895, also known commonly as the southern leaf-toed gecko, Yerbury's gecko, and Yerburi's leaf-toed gecko, is a species of lizard in the family Gekkonidae. The species is native to Western Asia.
