= Longstock Park =

Country park in Hampshire, England

Coordinates: 51.1467°N 1.4724°W

Longstock Park arboretum
- Location within Hampshire
- OS grid reference: SU370387
- District: Test Valley
- Shire county: Hampshire
- Region: South East
- Country: England
- Sovereign state: United Kingdom
- Post town: STOCKBRIDGE
- Postcode district: SO20
- Dialling code: 01264
- Police: Hampshire and Isle of Wight
- Fire: Hampshire and Isle of Wight
- Ambulance: South Central
- UK Parliament: North West Hampshire

Longstock Park is in the civil parish of Longstock in the Test Valley district of Hampshire, England, and forms part of the Leckford Estate (1520 ha.), wholly owned by the John Lewis Partnership.

== Description ==
Formerly Longstock Manor, of medieval origins, the park was purchased by Sir Joshua East in 1849. On his death, the park passed to his sons Alfred and Arthur. In 1914, the park became the home of the Beddington family until 1945, when it was sold to John Spedan Lewis, founder of the John Lewis Partnership. Lewis lived at Longstock House throughout his retirement until his death in 1963, after which the house became a retreat for the company's executives. The park is today home to a retail horticultural emporium, the Longstock Park Nursery, and also accommodates an arboretum, woodland gardens and water gardens.

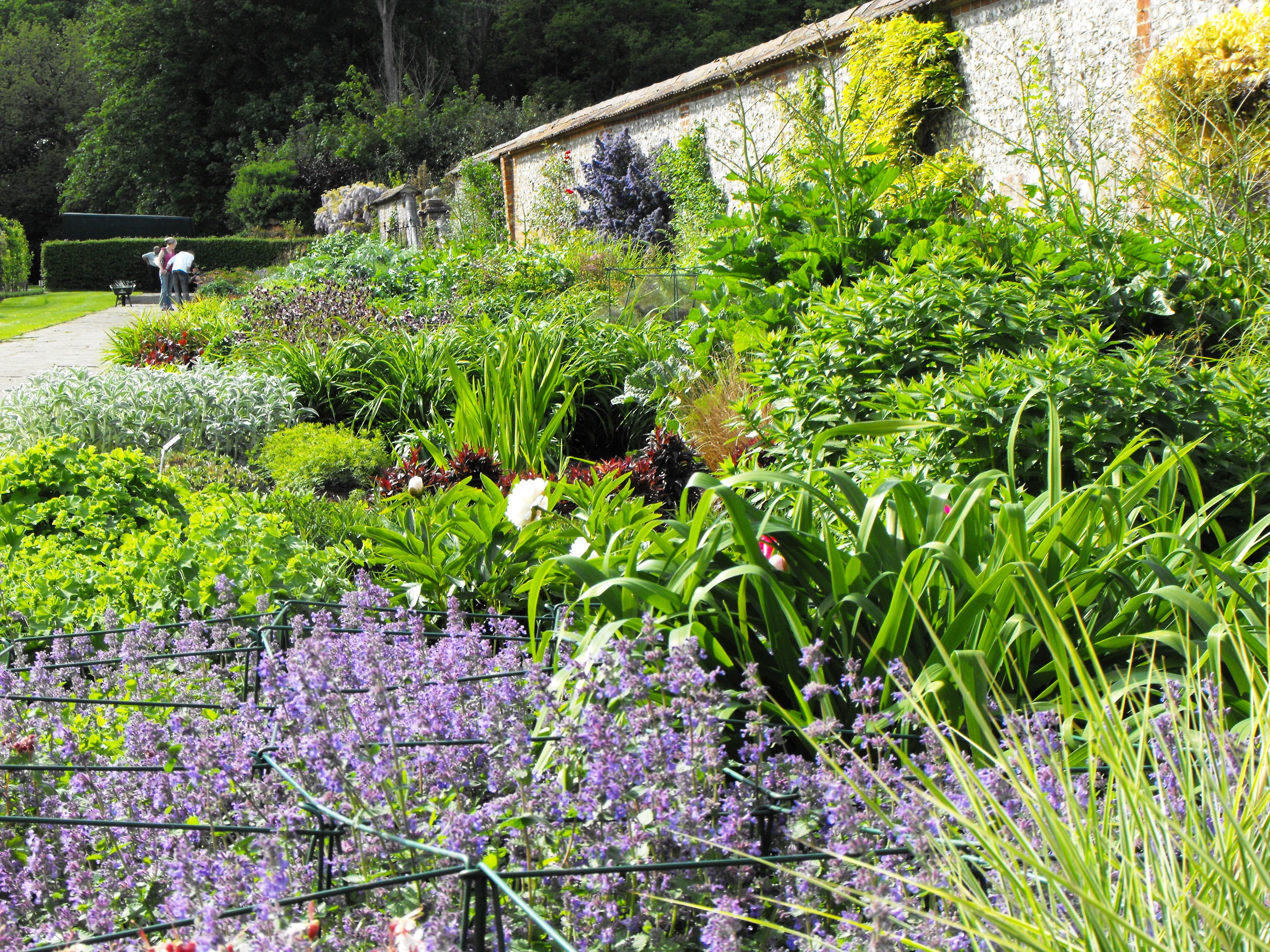
Part of the herbaceous border at Longstock Park

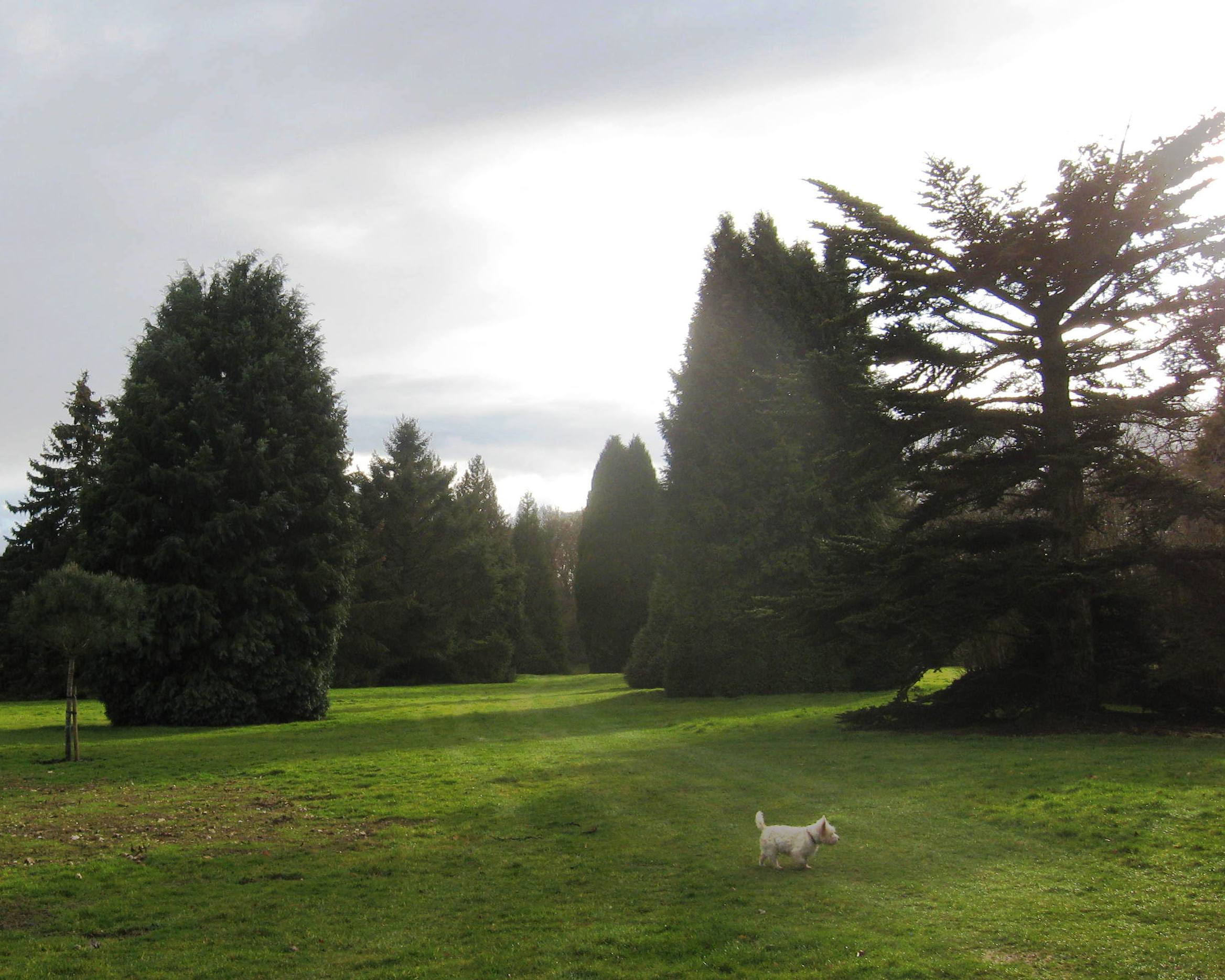
The Pinetum, Longstock Park

== Nursery and walled garden ==
The nursery, initially a wholesale enterprise, was founded in 1958 with the appointment of James Duncan as Director of Gardening. A mist propagation house, one of the earliest of its kind, was built soon afterwards, and John Brooks hired as Propagator. The nursery is set in and around a brick and flint walled garden, and is home to collections of Buddleja and Clematis viticella (accredited with Plant Heritage under the National Plant Collection scheme) and the Gilchrist Collection of Penstemons. Immediately to the south is an 80 m herbaceous border; running parallel with it is a clematis and fruit tree archway, flanked by beds of Buddleja cultivars. The nursery and walled garden are open to the public throughout the year.

== Water gardens ==
The water gardens comprise three hectares of woodland garden with lakes and interconnecting islands, declared 'the finest water gardens in the world' by the International Water Lily Society. The gardens were formed by accident; in 1870, Alfred and Arthur East, the owners of Longstock House, had gravel dredged from the banks of the River Test to construct a private road to their property, creating the lake in the process. After the Easts sold the property in 1914, Reginald Beddington, son of the new owner, elected to make an aesthetic feature of the lake.

The water gardens are usually open to the public on Tuesday to Sunday. An entrance fee is needed; no dogs except guide dogs are admitted.

== Arboretum ==
The arboretum was begun in 1869, and now comprises 28 hectares of mature trees including a pinetum with many exotic conifers. The arboretum is opened to the public in concert with the water gardens.

== Location ==
The Park is near the town of Stockbridge, which lies 2.7 miles (3.5 km) to the south-west.
