= Sloane Square Hotel =

Hotel in Kensington and Chelsea, London

Coordinates: 51°29′33.2″N 0°9′26.8″W

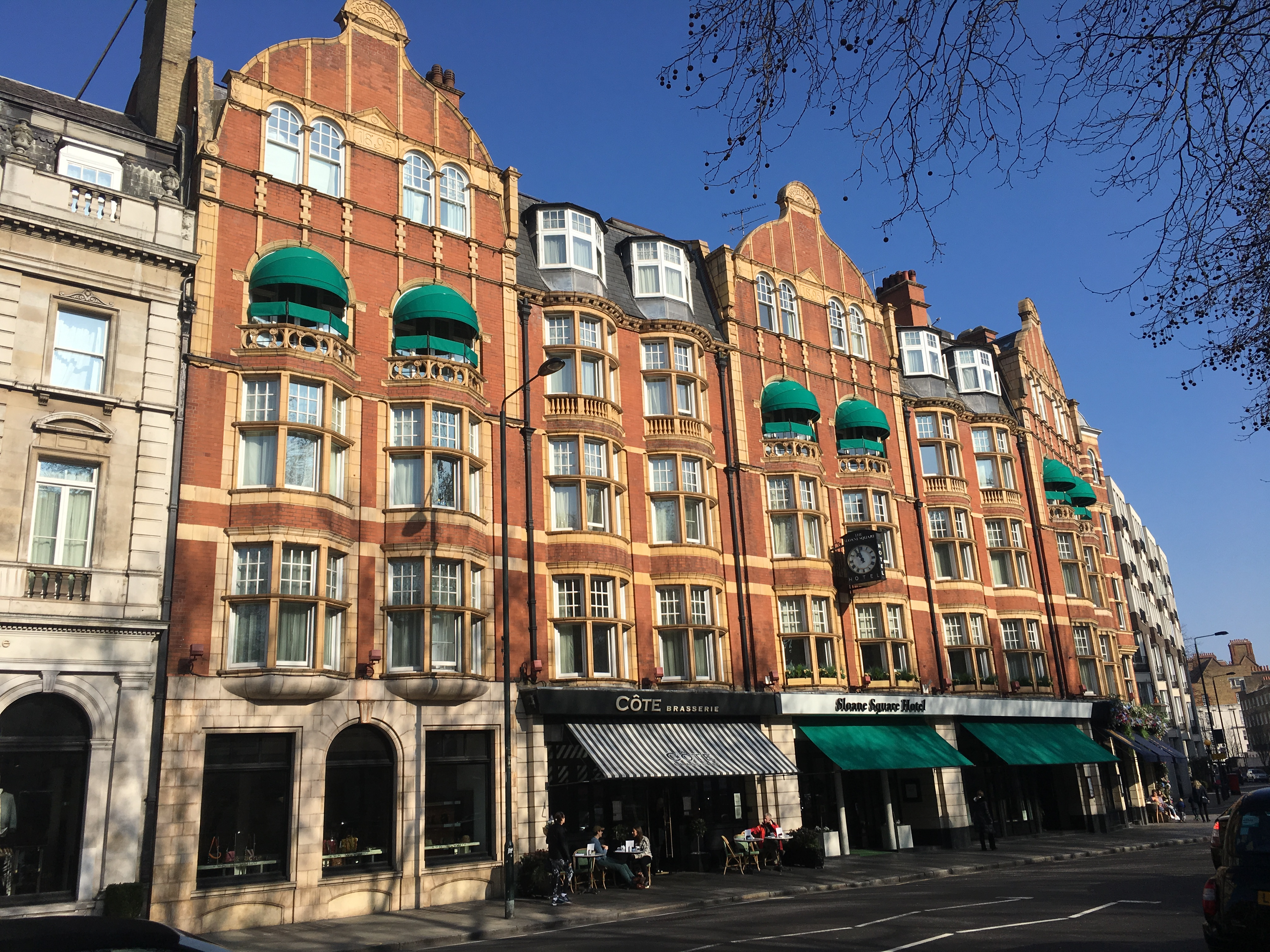
Sloane Square Hotel, February 2019

The Sloane Square Hotel is located on the north side of Sloane Square, in the Royal Borough of Kensington and Chelsea. Nearby notable buildings include the Royal Court Theatre, the department store Peter Jones and the Sloane Square Underground station.

== History ==
The building has been a hotel for over a century, ever since the rebuilding of the northern side of Sloane Square during the 1890s. In 1900 the lease for the site was taken by George Bernard and Amos Ballard, who completed the building and opened it as the Royal Court Hotel. By 1919, the running of the hotel had been taken over by the hotelier Auguste Wild. In 2005 the hotel was bought by the hotelier John Tham, former managing director of the Cliveden hotel, and renamed the Sloane Square hotel. It was completely renovated in 2006.

Following the bombing of Sloane Square Underground station in 1940, the hotel was used as staging post for treating casualties.

In early 1960, the hotel was temporary home to Peter Llewelyn Davies, a leading figure in London's publishing industry and the inspiration for J. M. Barrie's Peter Pan, while en route to Gibraltar. On 5 April 1960, Davies left the bar of the hotel and threw himself under a train at the nearby underground station, making "front-page news around the world".

During the 1960s, the hotel was part of the Swinging London phenomenon, which encompassed fashion, music, art and other forms of popular culture. Early in February 1962, The Beatles stayed in the hotel for several weeks, and in the following year they used the building as a venue for a photographic session on 10 February 1963. The hotel also played host to the first meeting between Paul McCartney and his future girlfriend Jane Asher, when McCartney was interviewed by the Radio Times on 18 April 1963.

== See also ==
- Hotels in London
- Sloane Street
- King's Road
- Cadogan Estates
