= Beechwood House, Highgate =

House in Highgate, London

Beechwood House
- Beechwood House shown in an estate agent's photograph from 1966

- Location within Greater London

General information
- Type: Mansion
- Architectural style: Regency
- Location: Hampstead Lane, Highgate, Camden, London, England
- Coordinates: 51°34′16.16″N 0°9′17.35″W
- Grid position: TQ 27873 87497
- Year built: 1840
- Client: Nathaniel Basevi
- Owner: Alisher Usmanov

Technical details
- Floor area: 3,018 square metres (32,488 sq ft)

Design and construction
- Architect: George Basevi

Renovating team
- Architect: Wimperis, Simpson and Guthrie

Listed Building – Grade II
- Official name: Beechwood
- Designated: 14 May 1974
- Reference no.: 1078354

Beechwood House is a Grade II listed large detached house set in 11 acres (4.5 hectares) of grounds on Hampstead Lane in Highgate, North West London, N6. It was built in 1840 in the grounds of the former Fitzroy House by the architect and developer George Basevi for his brother Nathaniel, a barrister. It has been owned by several prominent personalities including politicians Lewis McIver and Oswald Lewis, King Khalid of Saudi Arabia, and the Qatari sheikh Hamad bin Khalifa Al Thani. It is owned by trusts linked to the Uzbek businessman Alisher Usmanov.

== Design ==
The London: North volume of the Pevsner Architectural Guides describes Beechwood as "An uneventful two-storeyed stucco house, with two canted bays on the garden side, altered and added to". The 2010 edition of The London Encyclopaedia described the interior as remodelled in an "early Georgian style" by W. B. Simpson of Wimperis, Simpson and Guthrie. The grounds of Beechwood are 11 acres (4.5 hectares) in size, situated in Metropolitan Open Land and contain several other buildings, including "extensive garaging" and "guest and staff cottages, a squash court and gatehouses". Beechwood was Grade II listed on the National Heritage List for England for its architectural merit in May 1974. In 2008, the main house at Beechwood was described as having a drawing room, two dining rooms, and eight bedroom suites. Other buildings on the estate included a three-bedroom guest bungalow, eight-room staff quarters and a six-room pool house. The total habitable area of the property came to 3,018 square metres (32,488 sq ft).

== History ==
Beechwood was the home of the Liberal Party politician and financier Lewis McIver. He died at the property in 1920. Following McIver's death Beechwood was advertised for sale by the estate agents Prickett and Ellis in 1921 and described in an advertisement as possessing 13 bed and dressing rooms with three bathrooms and "charming old-world gardens" and that "no expense has been spared to make the place a perfect gentleman's home with every up-to-date convenience". In the early 1920s, Kenwood had not been acquired by the nation, and there were plans to build houses on its estate. The Times wrote in July 1921 that when properties such as Beechwood are put up for sale "... much is made of the fact that they overlook Kenwood" and that "Presumably the scheme for the partial covering of Kenwood will soon be proceeded with, unless more vigorous action is taken in securing it for the public". Beechwood was eventually sold at auction on 30 September 1921 for £16,000.

The Conservative politician and industrialist Oswald Lewis bought Beechwood in 1929. Lewis was the son of John Lewis, founder of the eponymous department store. Lewis planned to build an outdoor pool, though it was not completed until 1951 due to the Great Depression and the Second World War. The gardens of Beechwood were open to visitors in May 1960 for two shillings each as part of the National Gardens Scheme, when they were described as containing "Fine forest trees, azaleas, rhododendrons. Stream garden & swimming pool". Lewis wrote to The Times in 1955 on the subject of urban foxes, to respond to previous correspondents who had claimed that foxes cannot eat rabbits, they must eat pheasants or sheep. Lewis stated that he would be "sorry if they disappeared altogether" and that they "... help keep down the rats and eat the mice that would otherwise eat my crocus bulbs" and that "no doubt they vary their diet with an occasional fat beetle or French frog from my water garden".

In September 1966, members of the Highgate Society wrote to The Times to warn of the "imminent threat of speculative development" that hung over the "slopes of the Beechwood estate". The writers hoped that "there are still individuals and authorities far-sighted enough to secure a further addition to the Heath for public enjoyment". Beechwood was owned by the property developer John Hines in the 1960s, who sold it to the King of Saudi Arabia, Khalid, for £1.9 million in March 1977. Development work costing £400,000 started on Beechwood without necessary planning permission in September 1977, to build a 'royal bedroom suite,' a kitchen extension and a covered walkway called the "Queen's entrance".

In June 1975, Margaret Thatcher, leader of the Conservative Party, delivered a speech at a cocktail party at Beechwood in which she called on Prime Minister Harold Wilson to take "action on spending, on wages, on taxation and nationalisation" and declared that "If this Government and this Prime Minister cannot act now, we are ready to battle against inflation — the great destroyer. It will be our task to save the free society which has taken so many generations to build".

The Emir of Qatar, Khalifa bin Hamad Al Thani, bought Beechwood from the Saudi royal family in the late 1970s. The Emir was sued by a builder for £476,000 in September 1986, the balance of more than £2.8 million of building works that had taken place at the house.

Beechwood was listed for sale at £65 million in 2007, making it London's most expensive property at the time. In 2008, it was sold by the Emir of Qatar, Hamad bin Khalifa Al Thani, to the billionaire Uzbek businessman Alisher Usmanov for £48 million. It was valued at £82 million by the BBC in March 2022. The ownership of Beechwood House was transferred by Usmanov into an Irrevocable trust before the imposition of sanctions against individuals connected to the Russo-Ukrainian War in 2022. A spokesperson for Usmanov said that he was "[not] able to manage them or deal with their sale, but could only use them on a rental basis" and that he " ... withdrew from the beneficiaries of the trusts, donating his beneficial rights to his family".

In 2010, a planning application was filed by a company registered in the tax haven of the Isle of Man for a "Roman-style bathing complex" in the grounds of the property that would include a new indoor swimming pool, sauna, and gym. The plans were opposed by the High-gate Society who said that they "seem[s] to be very large and may well be over-development ...Any development which detracts from its setting would be unacceptable, and we will be alert to see if it is one of these ghastly mock-classical designs which seem all the rage around the Heath with people who seem to believe that big money automatically means good design sense." In 2011 further redevelopment work was planned with a "super basement" that would increase the size of the property by a third.

== See also ==
- Athlone House, borders Beechwood House to the west
