= John Spedan Lewis =

English businessman (1885–1963)

- Spedan Lewis in 1904
- Born: 22 September 1885; Marylebone, London, England
- Died: 21 February 1963 (aged 77); Romsey, Hampshire, England
- Education: Westminster School
- Known for: Founder, John Lewis Partnership
- Spouse: Sarah Beatrice Hunter (m. 1923; died 1953)
- Children: 3
- Parents: John Lewis (father); Eliza Baker (mother)
- Relatives: Oswald Lewis (brother)

John Spedan Lewis (22 September 1885 – 21 February 1963) was an English businessman and the founder of the John Lewis Partnership.

Elder son of John Lewis, who owned the John Lewis department store, London, Spedan joined the business at 19 and in 1914 assumed control of Peter Jones in Sloane Square, London. On his father's death he formed the John Lewis Partnership and began distributing profits among its employees in 1929. He transferred control of the company to the employees in 1950 and resigned as chairman in 1955.

== Early life and education ==
John Spedan Lewis was born in Marylebone, London, in 1885, the elder of two sons of John Lewis and Eliza Lewis (née Baker). His middle name was in honour of his father's aunt, Ann Speed, who had raised his father from the age of eight. His brother Oswald was born in 1887. Spedan was educated at Westminster School.

== Career ==
Spedan Lewis joined his father's John Lewis department store on Oxford Street, London, aged 19. On his 21st birthday he was given a quarter share in the business, and in 1914 assumed control of his father's second shop, Peter Jones in Sloane Square, London.

It was around this time that he first realised that the salaries of himself, his brother and his father were the same amount of money as the combined salaries of everyone employed by the John Lewis stores. In 1909, a serious horse-riding accident meant that he could not work for nearly two years. It was during this time that he seems to have first evolved the desire to share profits with his employees, and which grew over time in scope and detail to become the underpinnings of the John Lewis Trust and John Lewis Partnership.

Assuming control of the Oxford Street store with his father's death in 1928, Lewis officially formed the John Lewis Partnership, and began the distribution of profits among its employees (known as "partners") in 1929. The essence of the partnership was that workers could “get the whole profit and the sharing is entirely among themselves.” Partnership benefit, as it was called, was distributed in the form of shares, which could be realised for cash. He completed the move towards employee-ownership in 1950, with the transfer of control to the employees.

Spedan Lewis resigned as chairman in 1955, and was known within the company from that point on as "The Founder". He announced in 1960 that in his will he was leaving roughly £100,000 (equivalent to £2 million in 2025) to his successor, Mr Miller, to help the company.

== Personal life ==
In 1923 Spedan Lewis married Sarah Beatrice Hunter, a graduate of Somerville College, Oxford, and a buyer within the company from 1922. They had three children, John Hunter (1924–1932), Jill (1927–1968) and Edward Grosvener (1929–2008). Sarah Lewis became deputy chairman of the company, and remained so until her death in 1953.

Throughout his life Lewis was a keen and active natural historian. From 1933 until his death he was a fellow of the Linnean Society, which awards its John Spedan Lewis Medal for contributions to conservation. He employed Ethel Frances Chawner as curator of his collections from 1927 to her death in 1953. In retirement, Spedan Lewis lived at Longstock Park, near the village of Longstock in Hampshire. Upon his death, in accordance with his wishes he was buried at sea.

== Bibliography ==
- John Spedan Lewis 1885–1963: Remembered by Some of his Contemporaries in the Centenary Year of His Birth with the editor being Hugh Macpherson. Mainly black and white, colour plates relating to the business of the John Lewis Partnership and links with Waitrose Supermarkets With a foreword by Peter Lewis. Includes biographies of executives, and an index.
- Partnership for all by John Spedan Lewis, founder of the John Lewis partnership: a thirty-four year old experiment in industrial democracy (1948)
- Fairer shares: a possible advance in civilisation and perhaps the only alternative to communism (1954)
- Inflation's cause and cure (1958)
