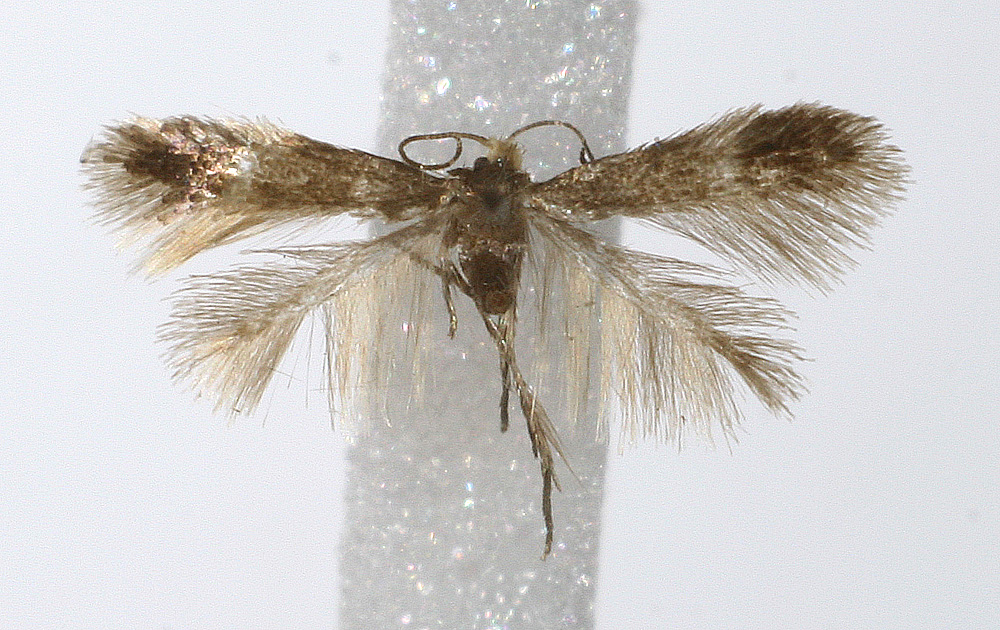

Scientific classification
- Kingdom: Animalia
- Phylum: Arthropoda
- Class: Insecta
- Order: Lepidoptera
- Family: Nepticulidae
- Genus: Stigmella
- Species: S. confusella

Binomial name
- Stigmella confusella (Wood & Walsingham, 1894)

Synonyms
- Nepticula confusella Wood & Walsingham, 1894

= Stigmella confusella =

Species of moth

Stigmella confusella is a moth of the family Nepticulidae. It is found from Fennoscandia to the Pyrenees, Alps and Bulgaria and from Ireland to central Russia.

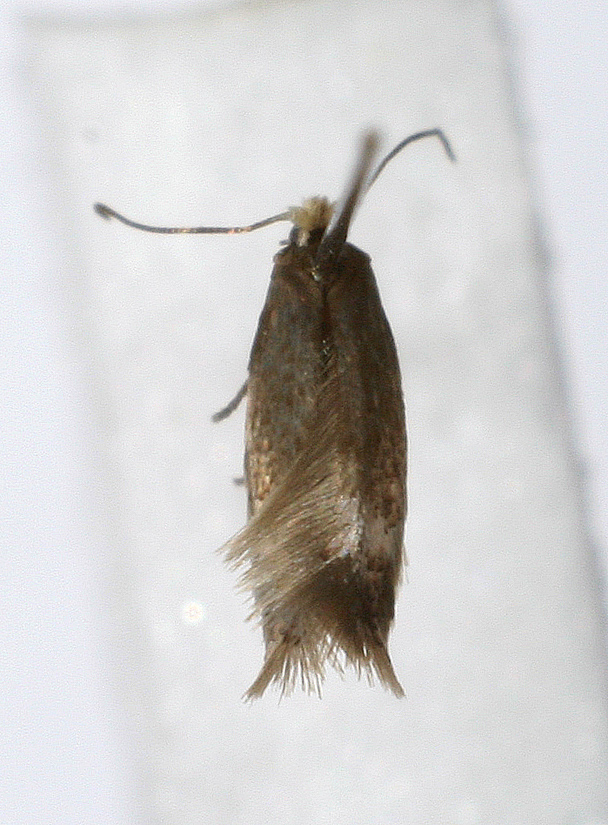

The wingspan is 5–6 mm.A small brownish-grey moth. The antennae are filamentous, dark, and half to two-thirds as long as the forewing. The basal, greatly expanded joint is white. The head is yellow-haired, the body dark. The forewings are brownish-grey with a narrow, straight, pale transverse band about two-thirds out in the wing. The part of the wing that lies within the transverse band is lighter and more brownish, the part outside darker grey. The hind wing is narrow, light grey, with long fringes. The species cannot be reliably distinguished from Stigmella lapponica by its external appearance, but is often more brownish in colour. Meyrick - The head is ochreous-yellow. Antennal eyecaps whitish. Forewings fuscous, faintly purplish tinged, especially posteriorly; a hardly oblique whitish fascia at 2/3; outer half of cilia whitish. Hindwings light grey.

Adults are on wing in May often a little later than Stigmella lapponica. There is one generation per year.

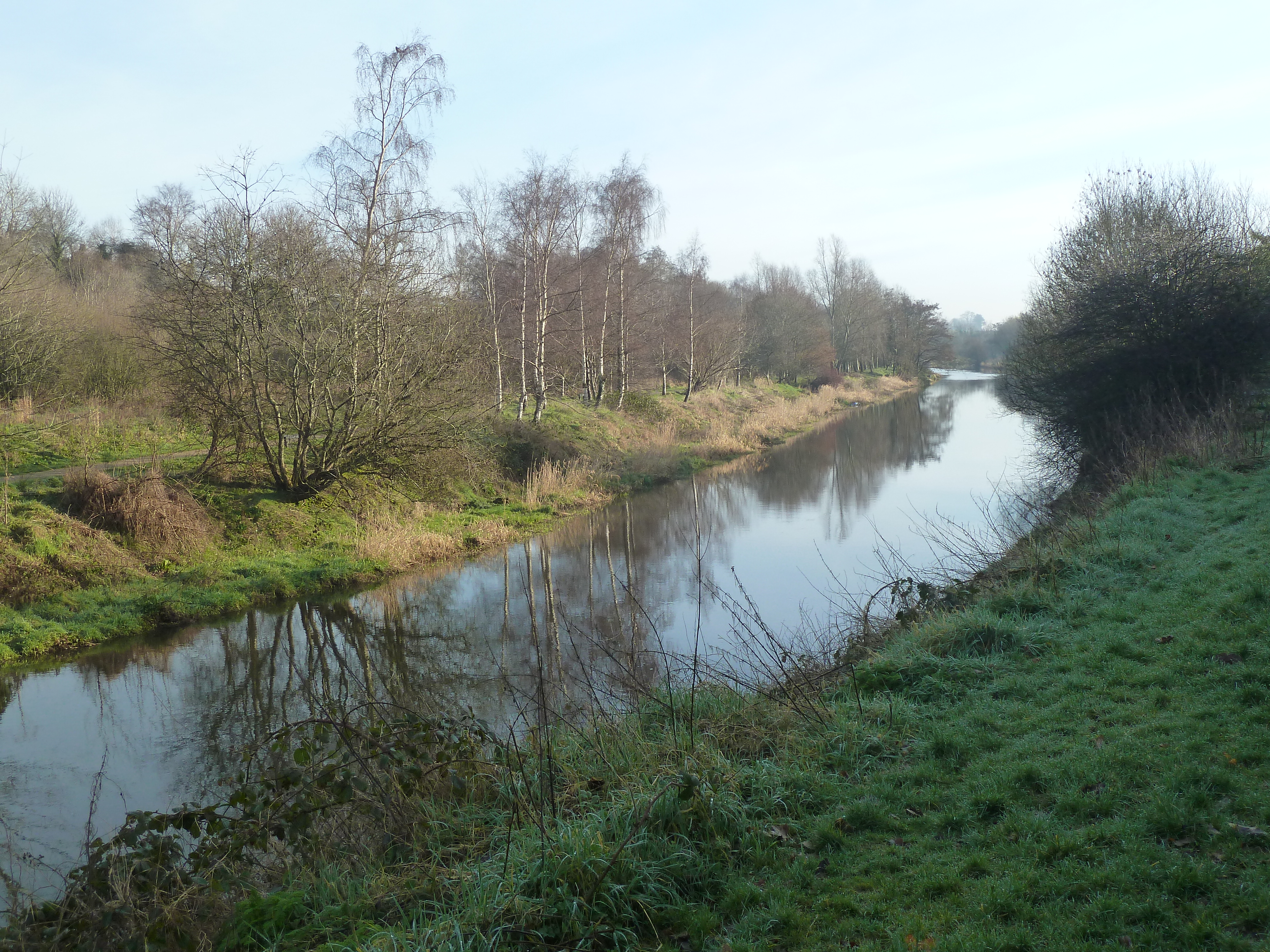
Habitat - silver birches on the left bank

The larvae feed on Betula species, including Betula nana, Betula pendula and Betula pubescens. They mine the leaves of their host plant. The mine consists of a long and slender gallery, 5-9 centimetres long and curved. The larva's excrement forms a narrow strip in the middle of the mine. The corridor follows veins over long distances. The species occurs on forest edges and other places where birch, which is the larvae's food plant, grows.
