= Ethel Frances Chawner =

English entomologist (1866-1953)

- Chawner probably ca. 1930s, as editor of The Avicultural Society
- Born: 1866; Surrey, England
- Died: October 16, 1953; Leckford, England
- Other names: E. F. Chawner, Ethel F. Chawner, Ethel Chawner, Miss E. Chawner, Ethel Francis Chawner, Miss Chawner

Ethel Frances Chawner (1866–1953) was an English entomologist with an interest mainly in sawflies and Hymenoptera. She was a lifelong member of the Entomological Society of London, and was employed by John Spedan Lewis from 1927 to her death in 1953 as the curator of his collections.

== Career ==
From the death of her father in May 1888 up until the death of her mother and her hiring by John Spedan Lewis in 1927, she lived in Lyndhurst, Hampshire, and many of her works focused on the New Forest. In 1894, John William Yerbury visited her and her brother, Laurence Chaloner Chawner, and looked at their insect collections. He noted that they each had good collections, but both were unlabelled. She was skilled at rearing sawfly larvae. At the time, she was 28 and her brother was 16. He again visited twice in April 1896, leaving Ethel with a box of Hymenoptera specimens.

=== John Spedan Lewis ===
John Spedan Lewis first heard of Chawner through her publications on Owls in The Avicultural Society magazine, after which he contacted her to request that she come take care of his growing bird collection. She helped to expand and catalogue his collection, which included around 300 owls and many other birds. When he moved to Leckford in 1933, Chawner followed him, and his collection grew to include live pheasants, ducks, swans, geese, and cranes. She retired in 1939, but continued to live at his home in Leckford until her death. After her retirement, the collection grew harder to maintain, and much of it, especially the captive birds, were spread out across others around the Western world.

=== Contributions and Legacy ===
In 1897, Chawner was elected into the Royal Entomological Society as an early female member, and her brother was induced the next year. She remained a fellow for 50 years, and housed the society's Hymenoptera collection at her home in Leckford for safekeeping during World War II. From 1919-1929, she was on the council of The Avicultural Society, a British society dedicated to the study of birds, where she published on a great deal of things including a Fraser's eagle-owl she kept in captivity, Sawflies, and the collection of Spedan Lewis. She was a lifetime member, having her subscription from July 1899 until her death, and was made a lifetime member after 50 years. She was the editor from 1935-38.

In 1901, Francis David Morice exhibited specimens of Hedychrum rutilans and Salius propinquus collected by Chawner, both new introductions to the British list at the time. She recorded multiple species of beetles in her birth county of Surrey, and her observations of birds around the New Forest were published in periodicals and books. Her notebook containing ‘notes on the biology and localities of sawfly larvae’, as well as some of her specimen collections, are housed at the Natural History Museum, London.

== Personal life ==
Ethel Frances Chawner was born in Surrey, England in 1866. Her father, Charles Fox Chawner, was rector of St. Mary's Bletchingly, and after his death in 1888 the family moved to Lyndhurst. Chawner's brother and uncle had both taken interest in entomology, her brother in diptera, and her uncle, Edward Chawner, reportedly in lepidoptera. She believed her uncle may have been Captain Chawner, a British Crimean War figure

She was "a highly cultivated woman with a delightful sense of humor, and [also] a shrewd judge of people," "a cultivated Victorian countrywoman." On top of her work in Sawflies and Birds, she was also an avid botanist and gardener, traveling miles to see rare plants as well as growing them.

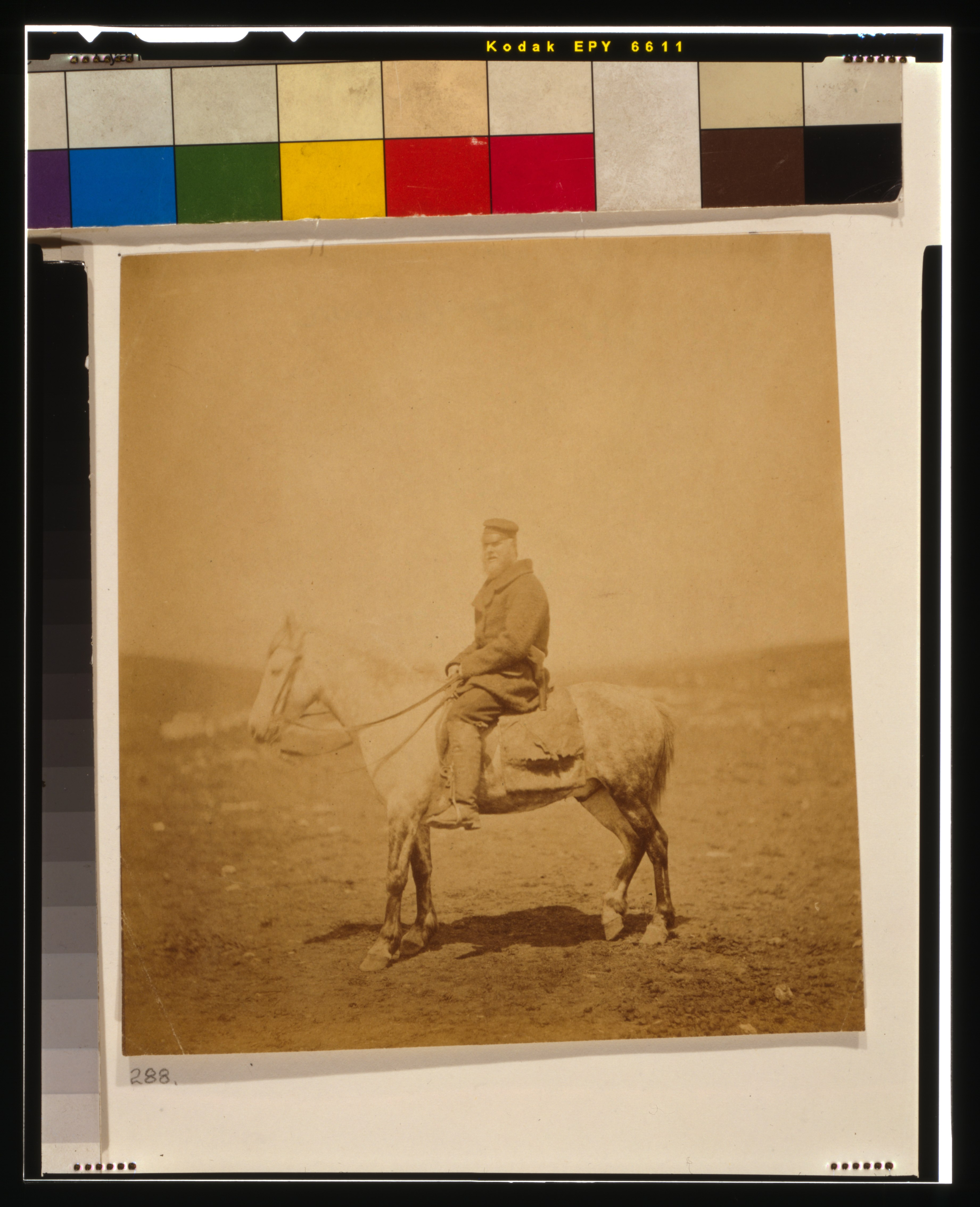
Captain Chawner, who she suspected to be her uncle, in 1855
