= Oswald Lewis =

British businessman, barrister, and Conservative politician

Member of Parliament for Colchester
- In office 30 May 1929 – 15 June 1945
- Preceded by: Laming Worthington-Evans
- Succeeded by: George Delacourt-Smith

Personal details
- Born: 5 April 1887 Hampstead, London, England
- Died: 12 February 1966 (aged 78) Highgate, London, England
- Party: Conservative
- Spouse: Frances Merriman (m. 1928)
- Children: 2
- Parents: John Lewis (father); Eliza Baker (mother)
- Relatives: John Spedan Lewis (brother)
- Education: Westminster School
- Alma mater: Christ Church, Oxford

Oswald Lewis (5 April 1887 – 12 February 1966) was a British businessman, barrister, and Conservative politician.

== Early life ==
Born in Hampstead, north west London, Oswald Lewis was the younger son of John Lewis, founder of the John Lewis & Partners department store chain that bears his name, and Eliza Baker. He was educated at Westminster School and Christ Church, Oxford where he received the Boulter Exhibition in Law and graduated with an honours degree in jurisprudence. He was called to the bar at the Middle Temple in 1912, but never practised. In 1911 he joined the 2nd County of London Yeomanry (Westminster Dragoons), and served in Egypt during the First World War.

== Business career ==
Lewis was a partner in John Lewis & Company until his father's death in 1928, when he sold his shares to his brother John Spedan Lewis.

Lewis returned to business after his political career came to an end; he was a member of the Worshipful Company of Farriers of the City of London, and was master of the company in 1952.

== Political career ==
Although originally affiliated to the Liberal Party, having been a prospective parliamentary candidate for North Dorset, by 1928 he had moved to the Conservatives. In December 1928 he was chosen as Conservative candidate to defend the seat of Colchester at the upcoming general election. He was elected as Member of Parliament (MP) and entered the House of Commons upon the 30 May 1929 election. He held the seat until his defeat at the 1945 general election by George Smith, who became Colchester's first and only Labour MP. Throughout his political tenure, Lewis chaired a number of standing and select committees.

In 1908 Lewis entered local politics when he was elected to St Marylebone Borough Council at a byelection. He was supported by both the Conservative and Liberal parties against a Labour Party candidate. He remained on the council until 1912. In 1913 he was elected to the London County Council to represent Hoxton for the Liberal-backed Progressive Party. He sat on the council until 1919.

== Personal life ==
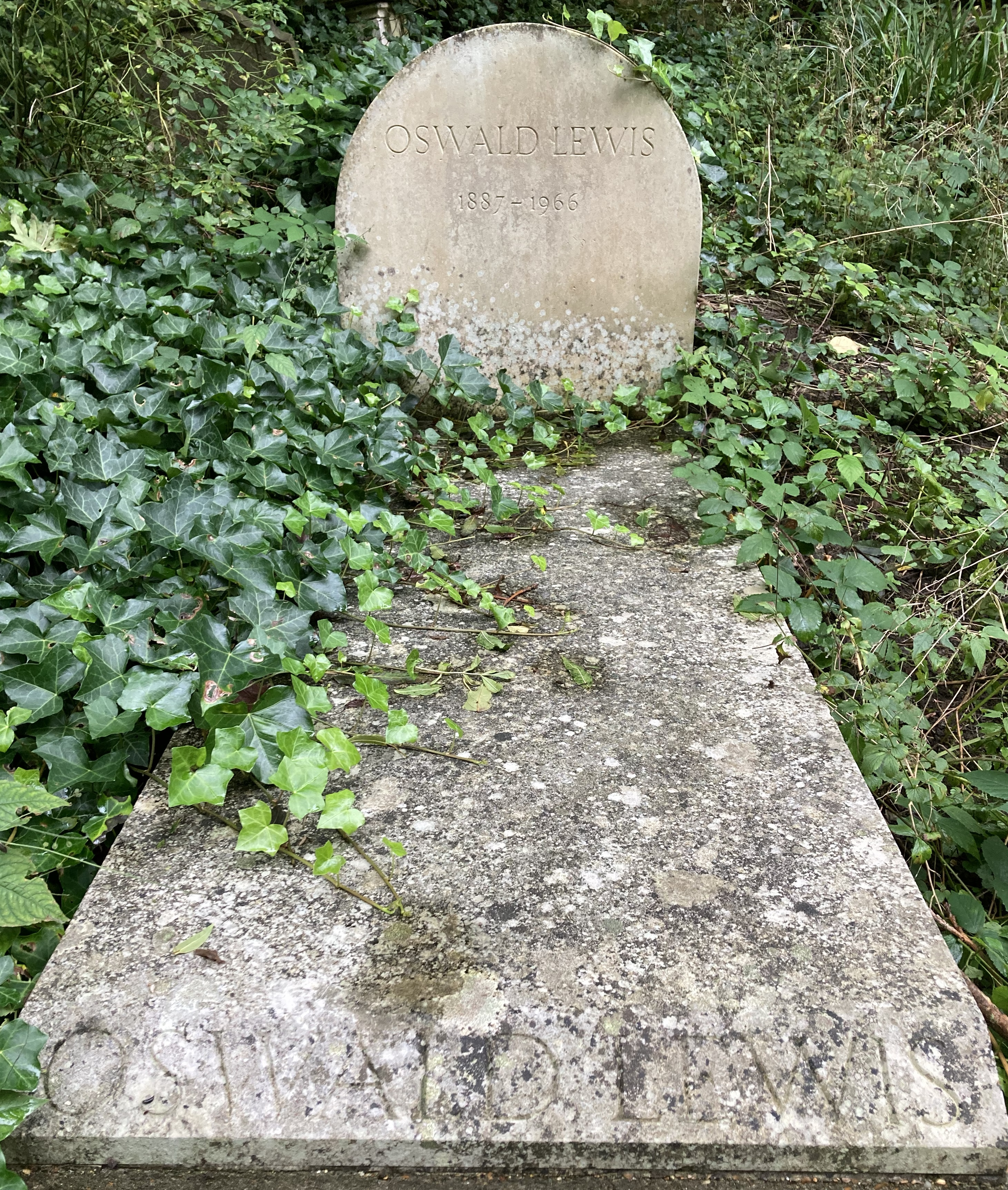
Grave of Oswald Lewis in Highgate Cemetery

On the year 1928, Lewis married Frances Merriman and the couple had two children, including Peter. Lewis was the owner of Beechwood House, Highgate, a Grade II listed Georgian house in 11 acres of grounds in Highgate, north London.

He died at Beechwood House on the 12 February 1966, aged 78, and is buried on the western side of Highgate Cemetery, on the main path near the entrance to the Egyptian Avenue.

Parliament of the United Kingdom
Preceded by Sir Laming Worthington-Evans	Member of Parliament for Colchester; 1929–1945	Succeeded by George Smith
