= Mountain leaf-toed gecko =

Scientific classification
- Kingdom: Animalia
- Phylum: Chordata
- Class: Reptilia
- Order: Squamata
- Suborder: Gekkota
- Family: Gekkonidae
- Genus: Hemidactylus
- Species: H. montanus

Binomial name
- Hemidactylus montanus Busais & Joger, 2011

Synonyms
- Hemidactylus yerburii montanus

Species of lizard

The mountain leaf-toed gecko (Hemidactylus montanus) is a species of gecko. It is endemic to Yemen. It is sometimes considered conspecific with Hemidactylus yerburyi.
