= Athlone House =

Large Victorian house near Hampstead Heath, London

Coordinates: 51.5714°N 0.1589°W

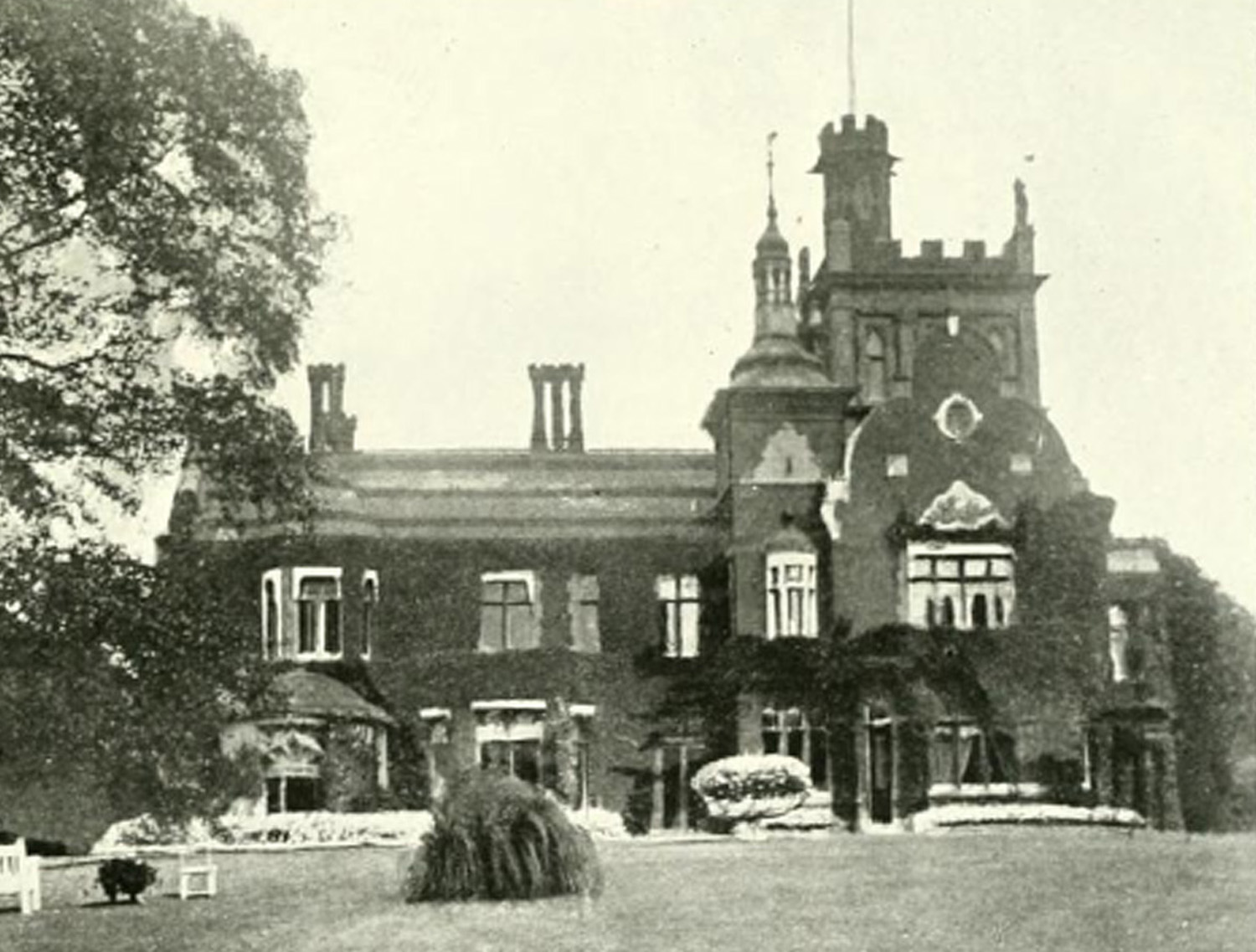
Caen Wood Towers (south view) circa 1900.

Athlone House, formerly known as Caen Wood Towers, is a large Victorian house in Highgate, north London, England.

Built around 1872, it was designed by Edward Salomons and John Philpot in an intricate style, particularly as to shape and brickwork, blending Dutch and classical influences. It lies on the northern edge of Hampstead Heath, from which it can be seen.

It was home to several important industrialists until the early 1940s, when it was acquired by the Royal Air Force. It was later a National Health Service home for people with dementia until 2003, when it was left derelict. In 2016, Russian oligarch Mikhail Fridman bought the house and restored it for use as a modern family home.

== Origin ==
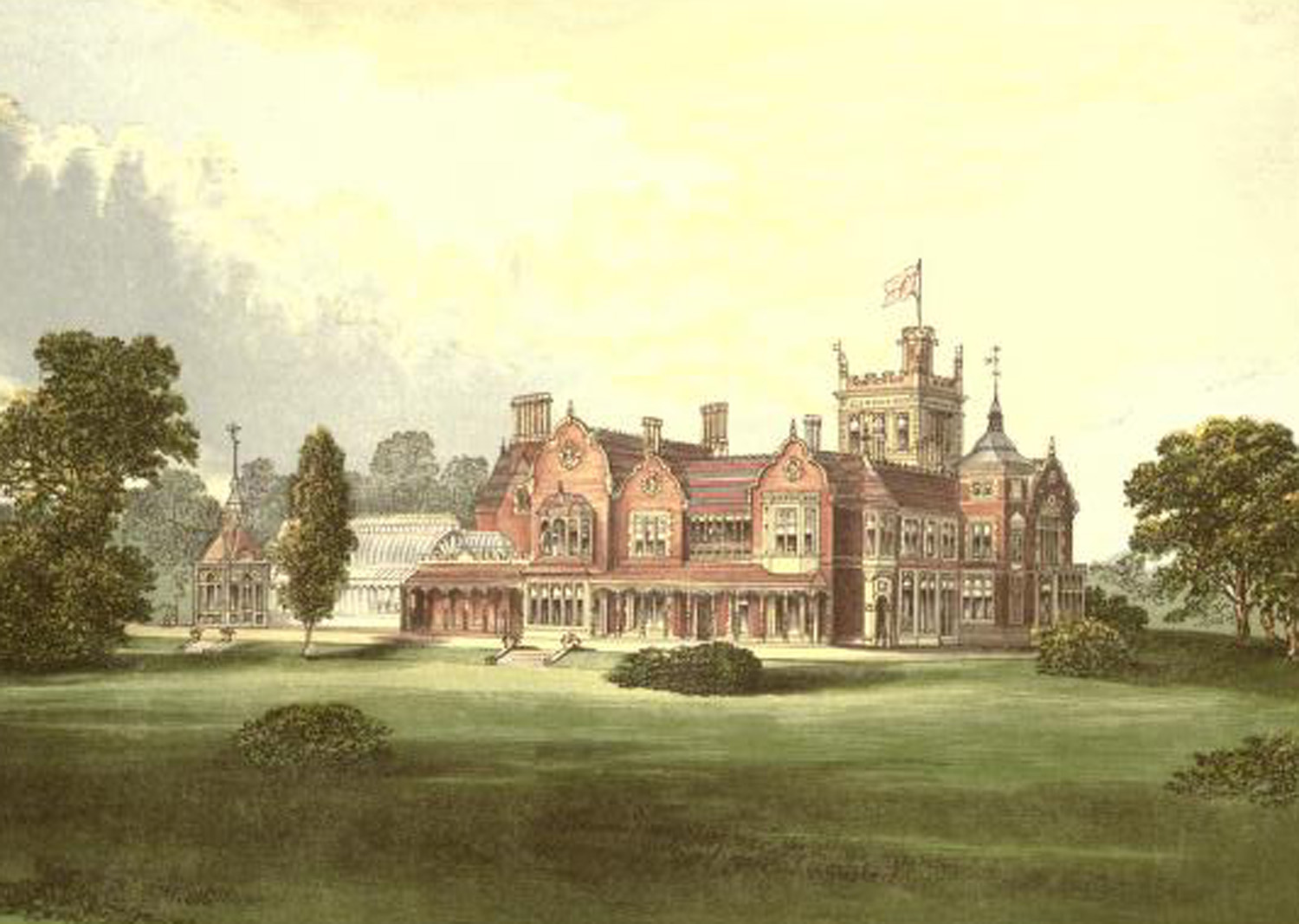
An engraving (c.1880) of Caen Wood Towers shortly after it was built by Edward Brooke.

The house was built for Edward Brooke, who was born in Manchester in 1832. He married Jane Emily Alston in 1857; they had many children. He also owned Pabo Hall in Conwy, Wales, which still has his portrait in the hallway.

In 1869, Brooke came from Manchester to London and bought Lord Dufferin’s estate at Highgate. Shortly after, he had the house, originally named Caen Wood Towers, built on this property.

The house is chiefly a mixture of classical architecture and neo-Gothic crenular with a tall dutch gable making up the pinnacle of the façade in front of a multi-turreted tower and with long, narrow Tudor-style chimneys on the left wing. A variety of stone and brick materials is therefore used in appropriate sections and the building is similar to the generally smaller follies of the time.

In 1877, Brooke's first wife, Jane, died and in the following year he married Frances Amyand Bellairs, daughter of the Reverend Henry Walford Bellairs.

Brooke was a partner in the firm of Brooke, Simpson and Spiller, who were aniline dye manufacturers in London. He became a Justice of the Peace for the County of Middlesex, for the City of London and for the County of Carnarvon. He was also one of Her Majesty's Commissioners for the Lieutenancy of the City of London. A book published in 1880, entitled A series of picturesque views of seats of the noblemen and gentlemen of Great Britain and Ireland, included a colour engraving of Caen Wood Towers and a descriptive article about Edward Brooke and the house.

Brooke left Caen Wood Towers in about 1885 and Francis Reckitt and his family came to live in the house.

== Francis Reckitt ==
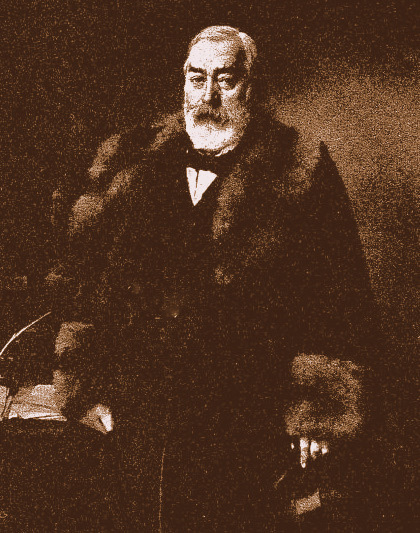
Francis Reckitt 1892.

Francis Reckitt was a partner in the company of Reckitt and Sons. His father Isaac had founded the firm and he and his brother Sir James Reckitt were directors of the company at the time he lived at Caen Wood Towers.

Reckitt was born in 1827 in Lincolnshire. He lived for some years in Hull where the Reckitt and Sons company was based and later moved to Hessle. He was twice widowed and had numerous children before he married Eliza Louisa Whitlock in 1877. The 1891 Census shows the family living at Caen Wood Towers and at this time there were four children still living with them. One of them was his son Francis William Reckitt who was an artist.

Francis Reckitt became wealthy and donated a great deal of money to establish public institutions. For example, in 1897 he paid for the Newland Homes Francis Reckitt House for infants. He also provided the funds to establish a new reference library within an existing library in Hull in 1890. The Reckitt Convalescent Home (now demolished) was built in 1907 with money donated by Francis.

Reckitt left Caen Wood Towers in about 1900 and Sir Francis Cory-Wright became the owner.

== Sir Francis Cory-Wright ==
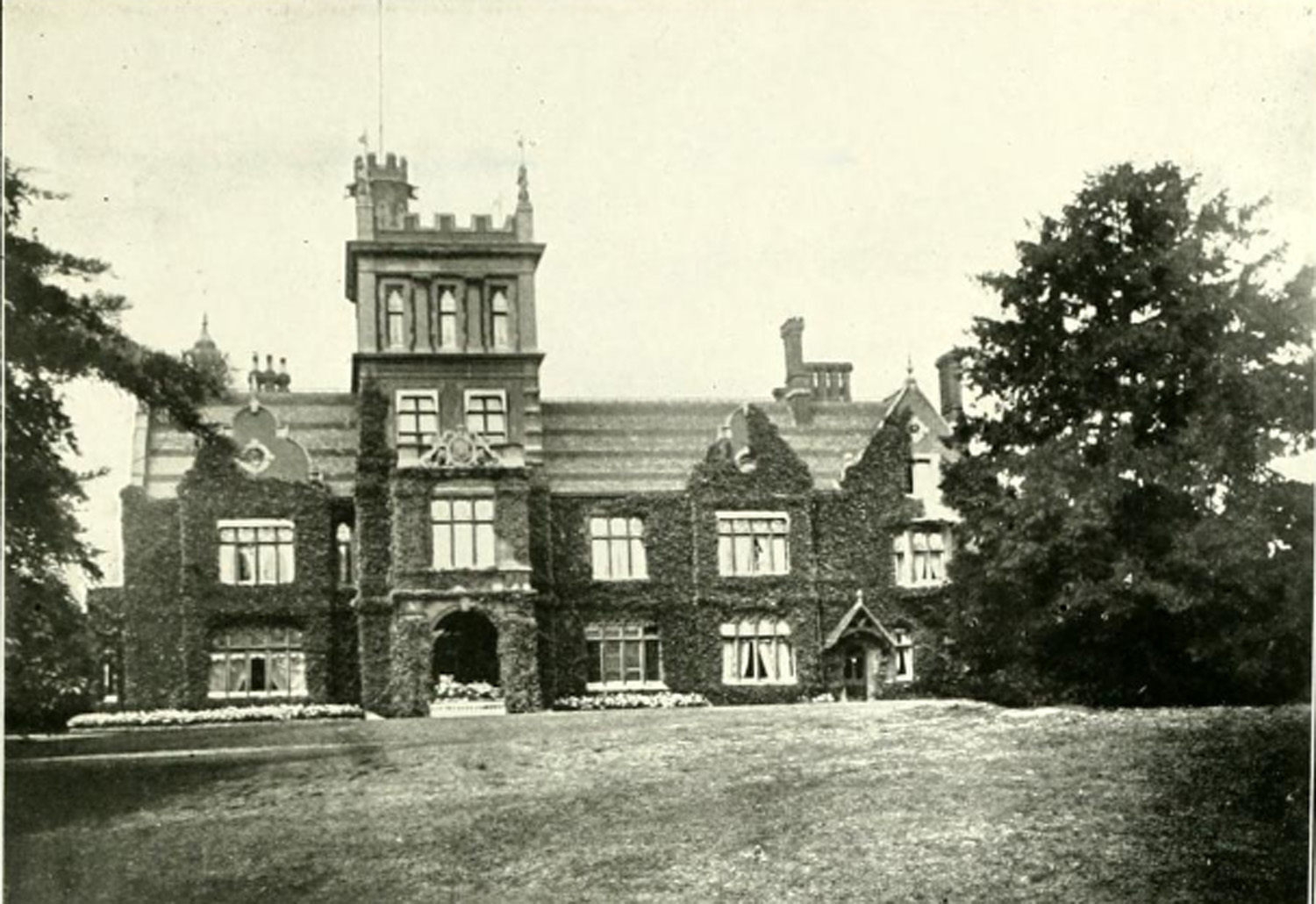
Caen Wood Towers (east view) circa 1900.

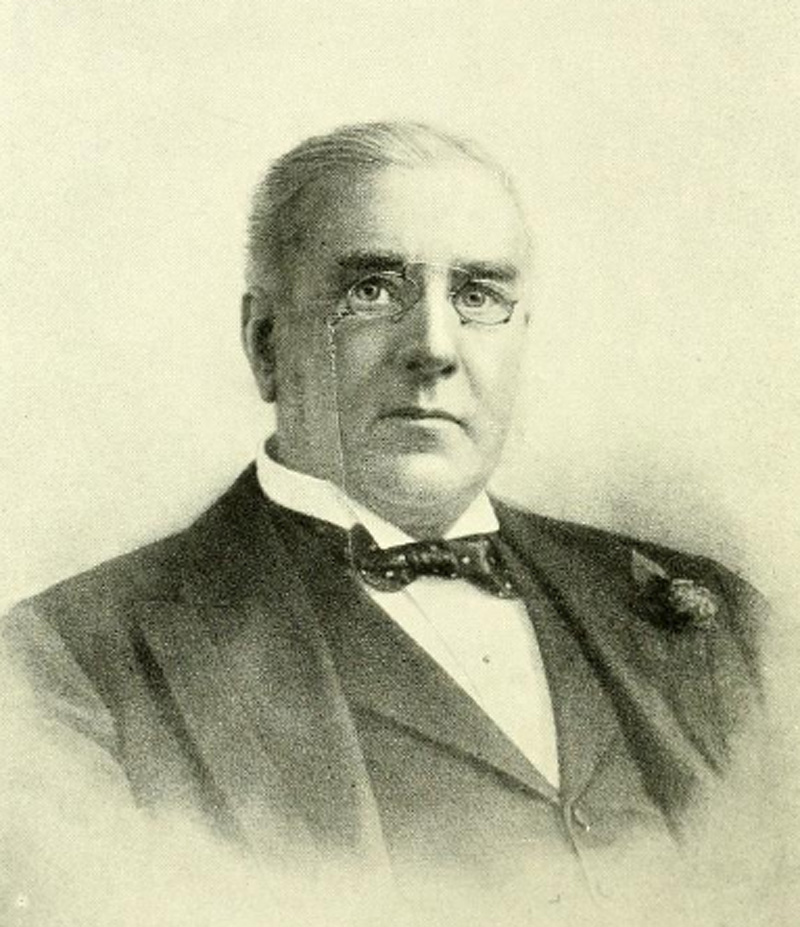
Sir Francis Cory-Wright circa 1900.

Sir Francis Cory-Wright was Chairman of William Cory and Sons, a large coal distribution firm. He was considered one of the best-known commercial men in the City and a chapter was written about him in "London Leaders" in 1907.

Cory-Wright was born in 1839; his father was Lieutenant William Wright of the Rifle Brigade. He was educated privately and entered the firm of William Cory and Sons at the age of 21. He became Chief of the company in 1888 and was credited with the large development of this firm which followed his appointment.

In 1868 he married Mima Owen, the youngest daughter of Sir Hugh Owen. They had two sons and three daughters. Cory-Wright was very interested in local affairs, particularly in the Highgate area. He led the movement to save for public use the area then called Churchyard Bottom, now Queen's Wood

Cory-Wright died at Caen Wood Towers in 1909. His widow remained at the house until 1911 when it was sold to Thomas Frame Thompson, who died two years later in a shooting accident. The property was then sold in 1914 to Charles Henry Watson who also owned a home called Ashmount in Hampstead; in 1919 he sold Caen Wood Towers to Sir Robert Waley Cohen.

== Sir Robert Waley Cohen ==
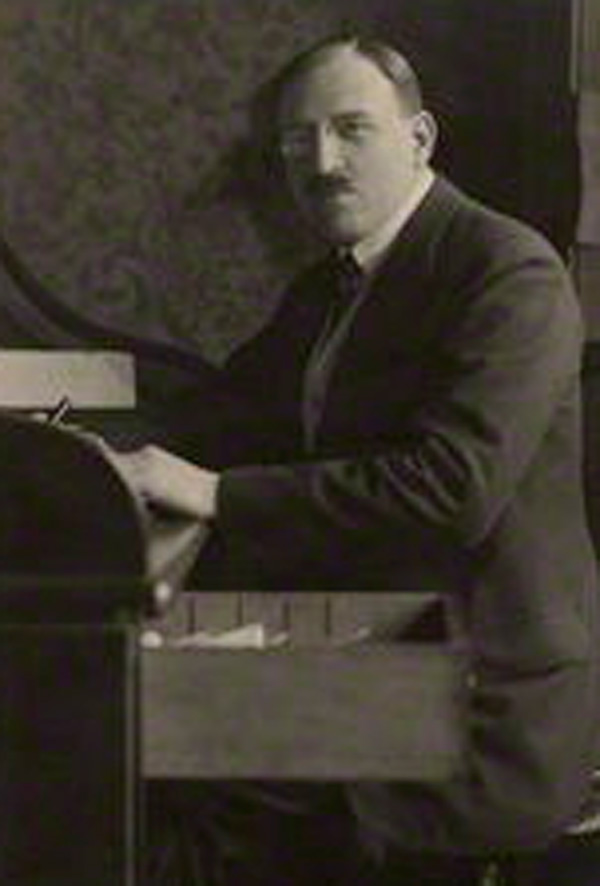
Sir Robert Waley Cohen circa 1920.

Sir Robert Waley Cohen was the Managing Director of the Shell Company. He was the longest and most prominent resident of Caen Wood Towers, living there for more than twenty years between 1919 and 1942.

Waley Cohen was born in London in 1877. His father was Nathaniel Louis Cohen and his mother was Julia Waley, daughter of Jacob Waley, Professor at University College, London. After Waley Cohen left Cambridge University he entered the Shell Company, eventually becoming its Managing Director.

In 1904 he married Alice Violet Beddington and the couple had two sons and a daughter. While they lived at Caen Wood they held numerous social events at the house and Lady Waley Cohen often allowed the gardens to be used for fetes and parties for girls' clubs, Boy Scouts, and to raise money for charity.

Lady Waley Cohen died in 1935 but Sir Robert continued to live at Caen Wood Towers until about 1942 when it was taken over by the RAF.

== Royal Air Force Station Highgate ==
In September 1942, the house was acquired by the Air Ministry. The RAF Intelligence School, formerly housed in a number of nearby houses in Highgate, moved into Caen Wood Towers. The site, officially named Royal Air Force Station Highgate, occupied the grounds and outbuildings of the Caen Wood estate. It included accommodation, messing, equipment stores and a medical centre. Because of the sensitivity of intelligence and covert operations during the war, the site's purpose was not made public and it operated under the guise of an RAF convalescence hospital. A number of different courses were run, teaching Air Intelligence, Escape and Evasion, and Basic Intelligence Analysis for direct entrants to intelligence work. Most of the instruction was given by visiting specialists (from the Air Ministry, MI6, MI9, Central Interpretation Unit at RAF Medmenham and Station X at Bletchley Park).

During World War II, over 6,000 officers of the British services (including dominion and Allied Forces attached to the RAF) attended intelligence training courses at the house. A description of the training given during the war at the house is contained in the book Shot Down and on the Run.

In late 1944, the school was hit twice by German V-1 flying bombs causing damage to the buildings and injuring a number of staff.

Following the end of the war, training continued at RAF Highgate until 1948 when the Air Ministry decided that the School should move to the Air Ministry building as they were de-requisitioning the property. RAF Highgate (Caen Wood Towers) was handed over to the Ministry of Health in 1951 and its previous role remained an Official Secret until 2005 when files (such as the unit's Form 540) were declassified and made available to the public in the National Archives.

The site was acquired by the Ministry of Health in 1951, renamed Athlone House in 1955 as part of the Middlesex Hospital Group, and converted into a pre-convalescent home for those not well enough to go to The Middlesex Hospital's Convalescent Home in Clacton. A new building was added for geriatric care.

== 2003 to the present day ==
The hospital was closed in 2003 and the site was sold to Dwyer Investments. The wing added in the 1940s and a 1970s extension were demolished, and three new blocks of luxury apartments built in their stead, called Kenwood Place. The original house was sold in 2006 to a Kuwaiti businessman of the Kharafi family for a reported £16 million. Planning permission to build a new house on the site was refused by Camden Council in 2010, and the refusal upheld by the Planning Inspectorate in 2011. In 2014 the developers Athlone House Limited again appealed against the decision to the Planning Inspectorate, but this was rejected in June 2015 after objections from The Highgate Society, which raised a 5,000-signature petition to preserve the house.

In January 2016, the Evening Standard reported that the house had been sold for about £20 million and that the new owners had contacted Camden Council "to discuss refurbishment plans", which were thought to include keeping the original house and building flats in the large gardens.

In April 2016, it was reported in the Sunday Times that the Russian oligarch Mikhail Fridman had purchased Athlone House for £65 million.

Under Fridman's ownership, extensive restoration work was carried out including roofing works, major structural repairs, restoration of stonework and brickwork, replacement of perished timbers, damp-proofing and replacement of all windows. The restoration was designed by architects SHH. The new roof won an award for Best Use of a Heritage Roof at the Pitched Roofing Awards 2021. A full restoration of services by Mechanical and Electrical Consultants, ME7 Ltd. A full MEP package was designed for the house, which entails ~50 ground source heat pumps of 450kw surrounding the site and several rooms benefitting from air conditioning amongst other services.

See also

- Beechwood House, borders Athlone House to the east
- Kenwood House, to the west.
