= Hemidactylus yerburii =

Conservation status
- Least Concern (IUCN 3.1)

Scientific classification
- Kingdom: Animalia
- Phylum: Chordata
- Class: Reptilia
- Order: Squamata
- Suborder: Gekkota
- Family: Gekkonidae
- Genus: Hemidactylus
- Species: H. yerburii

Binomial name
- Hemidactylus yerburii J. Anderson, 1895
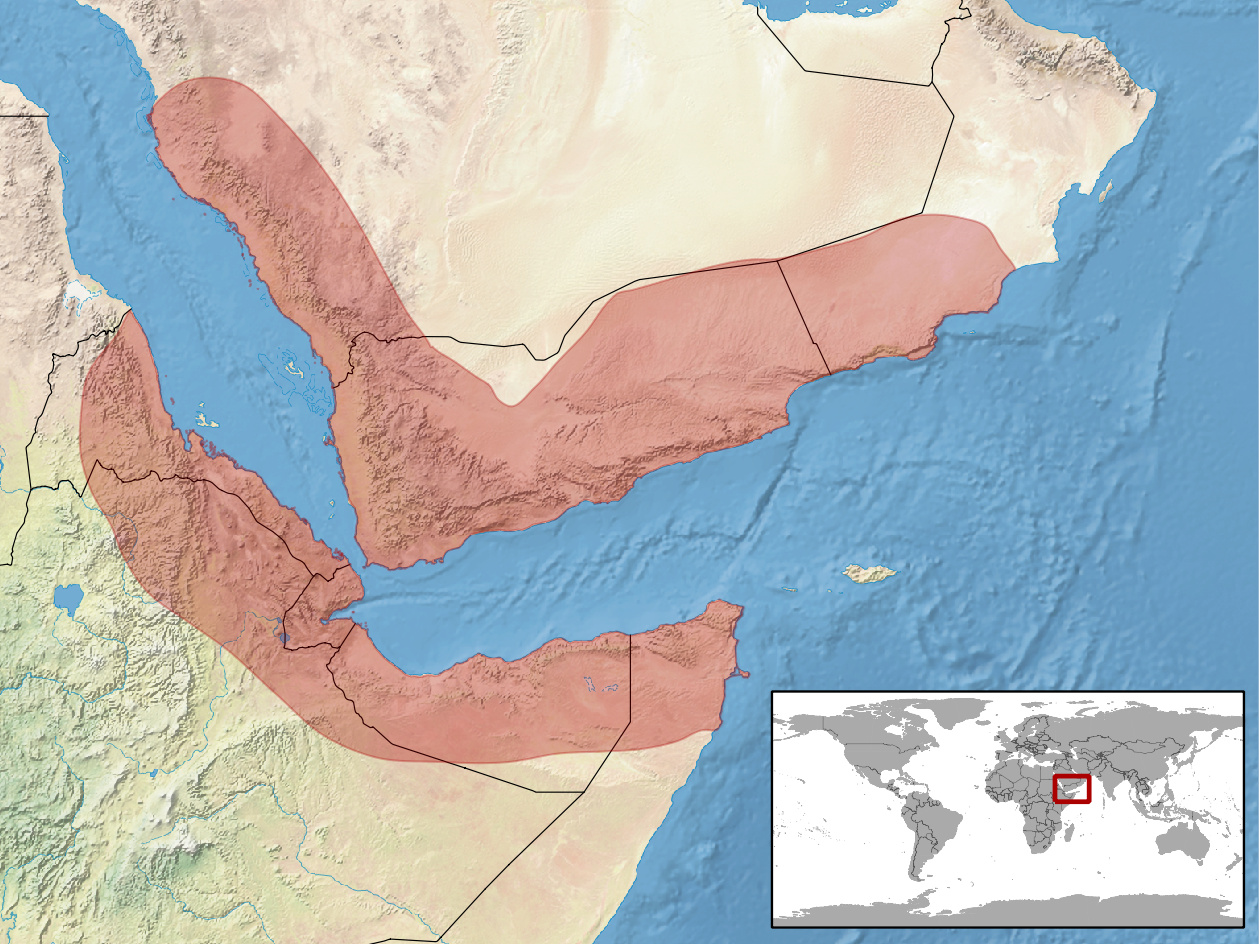
- Hemidactylus yerburii distribution. The African part of the range is no longer included in this species.

Synonyms
- Hemidactylus yerburii J. Anderson, 1895; Hemidactylus yerburyi [sic] — J. Anderson, 1901 (unjustified emendation); Hemidactylus turcicus yerburyi — Loveridge, 1941; Hemidactylus yerburyi — Haas & Battersby, 1959; Hemidactylus yerburyii [sic] — Rösler, 2000; Hemidactylus yerburii — Sindaco et al., 2014

Species of lizard

Hemidactylus yerburii, also known commonly as the southern leaf-toed gecko, Yerbury's gecko, and Yerburi's leaf-toed gecko, is a species of lizard in the family Gekkonidae. The species is native to Western Asia.

== Geographic range ==
H. yerburii is found on the southern Arabian Peninsula in Saudi Arabia and Yemen.

== Taxonomy ==
Populations of H. yerburii reported from Africa are based on misidentifications (H. macropholis), or have been elevated from subspecies to full species rank, namely H. montanus and H. pauciporus.

== Etymology ==
The specific name, yerburii, is in honor of amateur entomologist Lieutenant Colonel John William Yerbury (1847–1927), who collected the holotype.

== Habitat ==
H. yerburii, in the sense of including African populations no longer included in this species, occurs in a wide range of habitats from rocky desert areas to well vegetated habitats, including lowland deciduous forest and shrubland, and also occurs on buildings in settlements. It is found from the sea level to 1,500 m (4,900 ft) asl.

== Reproduction ==
H. yerburii is oviparous.

== Abundance ==
H. yerburii is very rare; the species was described based on a single female.
