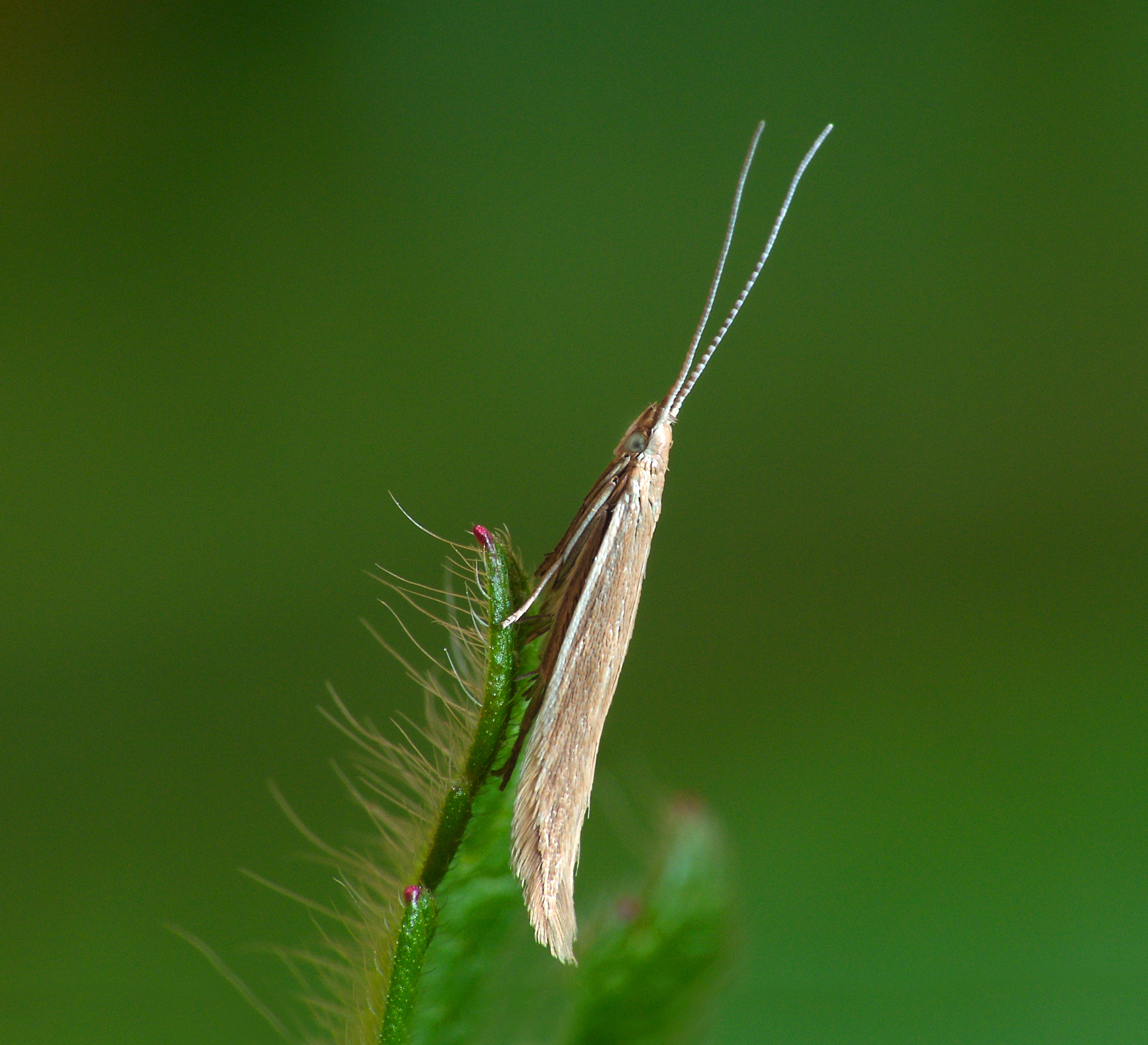
- Ex larva, Somerset England Genitalia determination

Scientific classification
- Kingdom: Animalia
- Phylum: Arthropoda
- Class: Insecta
- Order: Lepidoptera
- Family: Coleophoridae
- Genus: Coleophora
- Species: C. glaucicolella

Binomial name
- Coleophora glaucicolella Wood, 1892

Synonyms
- Perygra glaucicolella

= Coleophora glaucicolella =

Species of moth

Coleophora glaucicolella is a moth of the family Coleophoridae, found in Asia, Europe and North America. It occurs in forest-steppe biotopes, wet meadows and meadow-steppe.

== Description ==
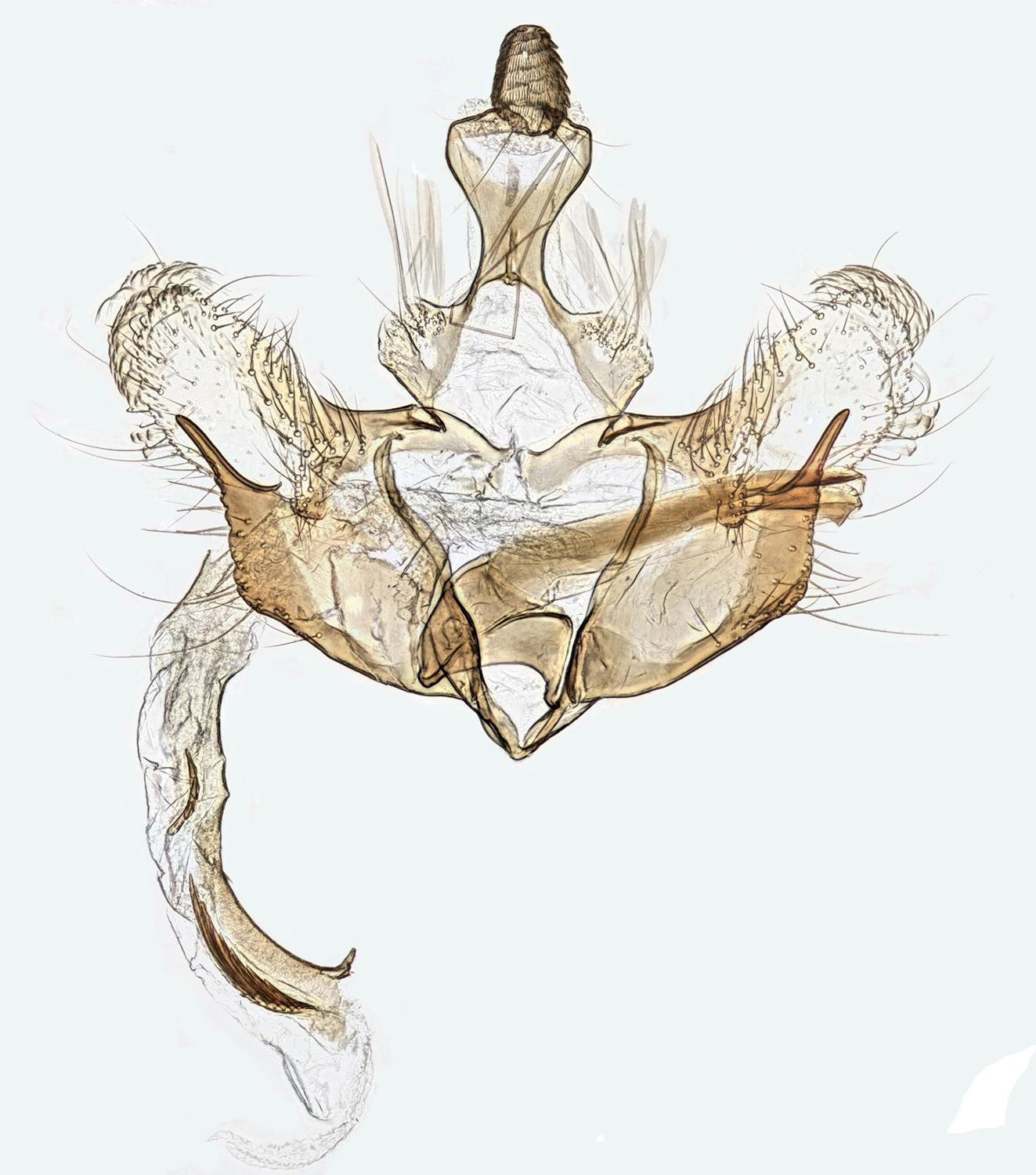
Coleophora glaucicolella, Trawscoed, North Wales Male genitalia

The wingspan is 10–12 mm. Forewings pale and often yellowish or ochreous – tinged, usually with darker greyish streaks between veins towards costa. Only reliably identified by dissection and microscopic examination of the genitalia.

Adults are on wing from June to August at sunrise, dusk and night.

The larvae feed on the seeds of rushes (Juncus species), including Juncus inflexus, compact rush (Juncus conglomeratus), soft rush (Juncus effusus) and saltmarsh rush (Juncus gerardii), and supposedly also on woodrush (Luzula species). They create a trivalved, tubular silken case.

== Distribution ==
It is found from Europe, east to the Urals and Iran, west to Greenland and North America (where it is found in most of Canada and Ohio). It is also found in China.
