= Hemidactylus pauciporosus =

Scientific classification
- Domain: Eukaryota
- Kingdom: Animalia
- Phylum: Chordata
- Class: Reptilia
- Order: Squamata
- Infraorder: Gekkota
- Family: Gekkonidae
- Genus: Hemidactylus
- Species: H. pauciporosus

Binomial name
- Hemidactylus pauciporosus Lanza, 1978

Synonyms
- Hemidactylus yerburii pauciporosus Lanza, 1978; Hemidactylus yerburyi pauciporosus

Species of lizard

Hemidactylus pauciporosus is a species of gecko. It is endemic to Somalia. It was originally described as a subspecies of Hemidactylus yerburii, but recognized as a species in 2016.
