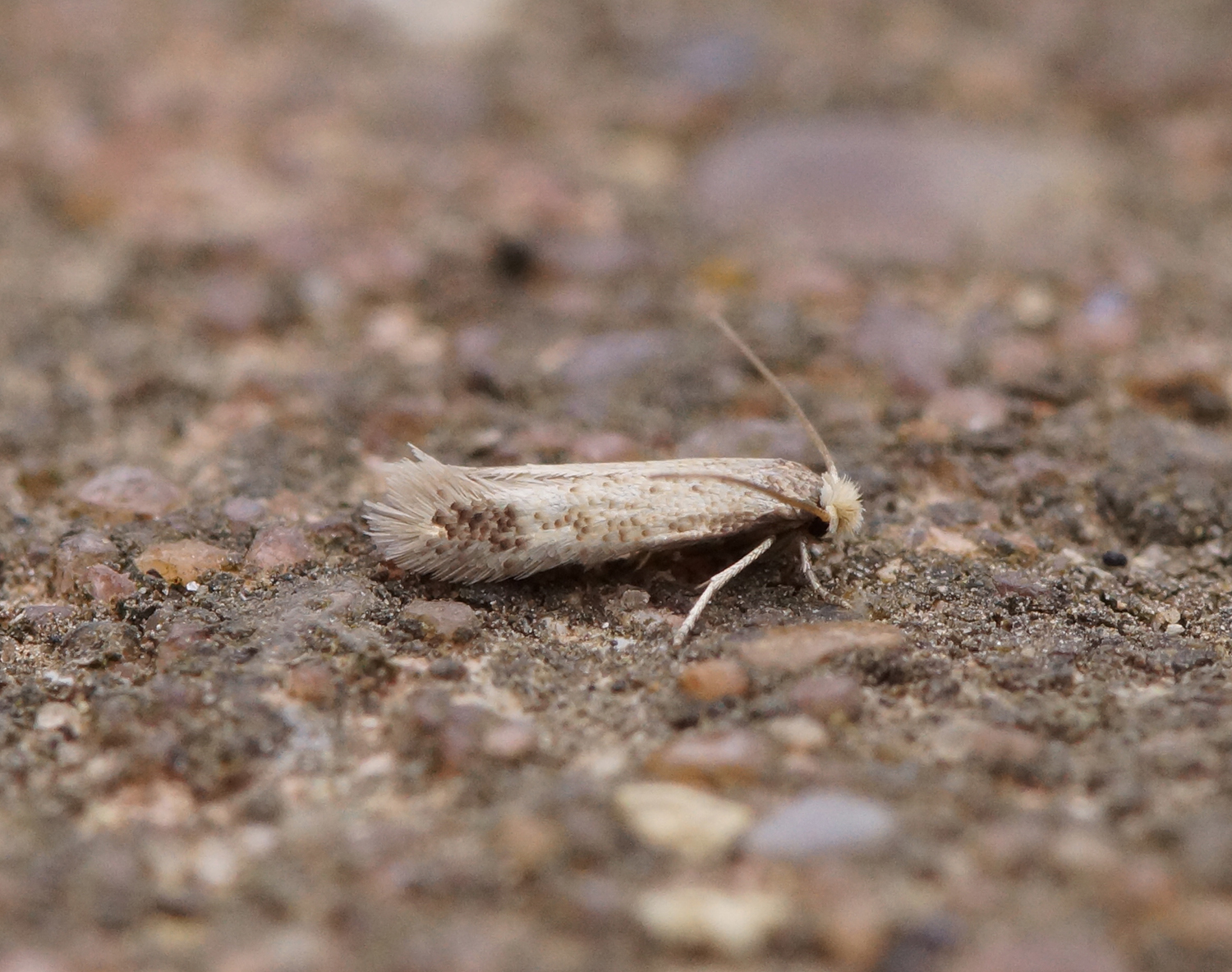

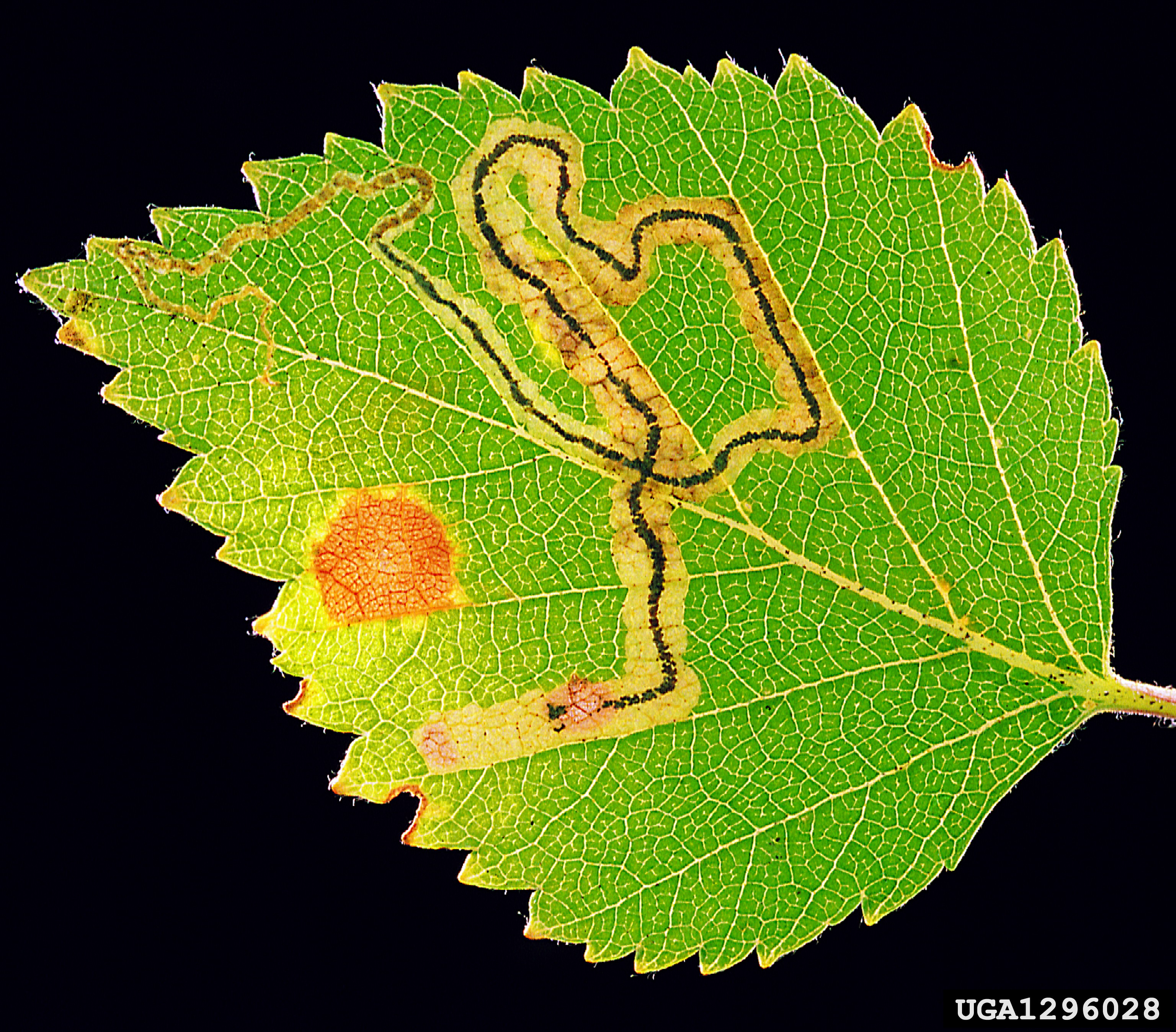

Scientific classification
- Kingdom: Animalia
- Phylum: Arthropoda
- Class: Insecta
- Order: Lepidoptera
- Family: Nepticulidae
- Genus: Stigmella
- Species: S. lapponica

Binomial name
- Stigmella lapponica (Wocke, 1862)

Synonyms
- Nepticula lapponica Wocke, 1862; Nepticula lusatica Schutze, 1904; Nepticula vossensis Gronlien, 1928

= Stigmella lapponica =

Species of moth

Stigmella lapponica is a moth of the family Nepticulidae found in Asia, Europe and North America. It was first described by the German entomologist, Maximilian Ferdinand Wocke in 1862. The larvae mine (feed inside) the leaves of birch (Betula species).

== Description ==
The wingspan is 5–7 mm. The head is ferruginous-orange to blackish. The antennal eyecaps are whitish. The forewings are light fuscous with a somewhat oblique shining whitish-ochreous fascia at 2/3. The apical area beyond this darker purple-fuscous; cilia round apex ochreous whitish except at base. The hindwings are light grey.

== Life history ==
Adults are on wing in May. There is one generation per year.

Ovum

Eggs are laid on the underside of a birch leaf, usually beside a rib. Species recorded include shrubby birch (Betula humilis), dwarf birch (Betula nana), silver birch (Betula pendula) and downy birch (Betula pubescens), including Betula pubescens carpatica.

Larvae

Larvae are greenish white with a darker green gut; the head has some brown which is darker than the similar looking Stigmella confusella. They mine the leaves of their host plant in a slender corridor that hardly widens. The first quarter of the mine is filled with cloudy green frass and the mine than becomes wider with black frass, leaving broad clear margins. The gallery is long and tends to be angular as it follows veins and makes sudden changes in direction; it can cross veins and the midrib. They feed in June and July and have been found in October, suggesting a partial second brood.

Cocoon

The cocoon is spun below the surface and is deep reddish or purplish brown.

== Distribution ==
It is found in most of Europe (except the Balkan Peninsula and the Mediterranean islands), east to the eastern part of the Palearctic realm. The moth has been found in British Columbia Canada.

== Etymology ==
Stigmella lapponica was described by Maximilian Ferdinand Wocke in 1862 from a specimen found at Bossekop, Finnmark, Norway. The specific name refers to lapponicus, Lappish; the location of the type specimen in northern Norway. Stigmella – ″stigma″, a small dot or a brand, referring to the conspicuous (or occasionally metallic) fascia on the forewing of many of the Stigmella species, or possibly the small size of the moths.
