= John Henry Wood =

English entomologist (1841–1914)

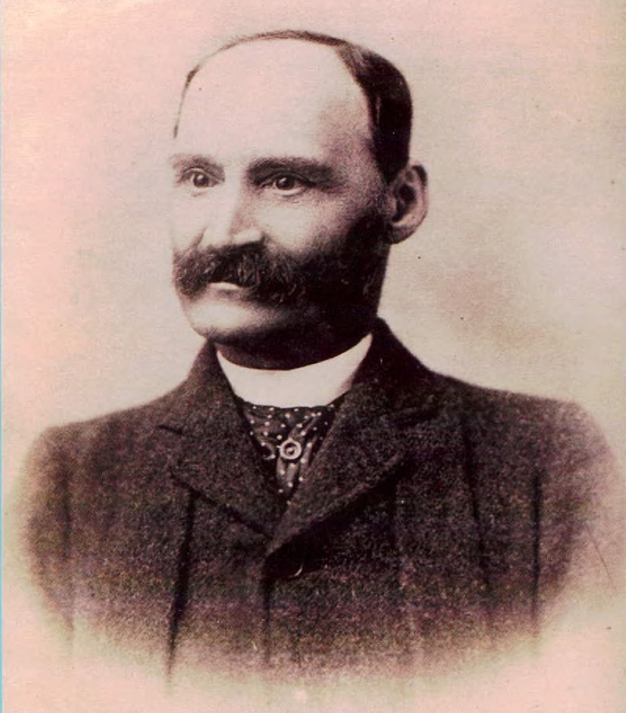

John Henry Wood (14 April 1841 – 28 August 1914) was an English entomologist. He took an interest in the microlepidoptera and flies of Herefordshire. The tortricid moth Celypha woodiana was named after him by C. G. Barrett.

== Life and work ==
Wood was born in Ledbury where his father Miles Astman was a physician practicing at Orchardleigh, New Street. Wood went to the Swansea Grammar School. He became a medical student at King's College, London, staying with uncle Joseph Webb who was also a physician, and licensed as a physician (M.B.C.S) in 1862. He then practised in Tarrington, Herefordshire. His younger brothers included Miles who continued his father's practice, (later Major General Sir) Elliott Wood, and C.K. Wood (later Colonel and Chief Royal Engineer). He travelled extensively on foot and bicycle to collect specimens. He went on canoe trips with his brother Elliott, and was also a keen cyclist and tennis player. He wrote 45 scientific papers on Microlepidoptera and, later Diptera and described several new species including Coleophora glaucicolella, Coleophora sylvaticella and Stigmella confusella. He also encouraged other entomologists including Mrs Emma Sarah Hutchinson (1820-1905) who reared Lepidoptera. The description of Stigmella confusella was a collaboration with his friend Thomas de Grey, 6th Baron Walsingham. His collections were bequeathed to the Hereford Museum.
