= John Lewis (department store founder) =

English businessman (1836–1928)

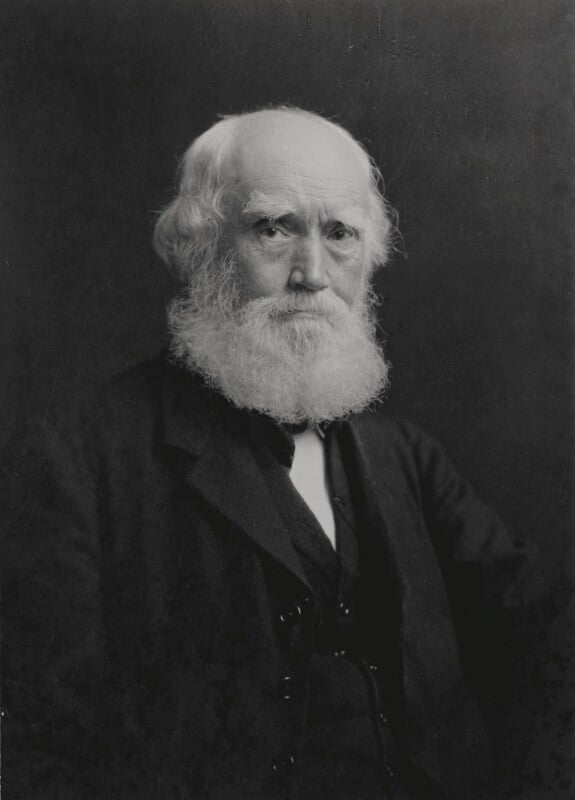
- Lewis, 1920–28
- Born: 24 February 1836; Shepton Mallet, Somerset, England
- Died: 8 June 1928 (aged 92); Hampstead, London, England
- Known for: Founder, John Lewis & Co.
- Political party: Liberal
- Spouse: Eliza Baker (m. 1884)
- Children: John Spedan Lewis; Oswald Lewis

John Lewis (24 February 1836 – 8 June 1928) was an English businessman and county councillor, known for being the founder of the John Lewis department store on Oxford Street, London and the national John Lewis & Partners chain of department stores.

== Early life ==
John Lewis was born in Shepton Mallet, Somerset, England, and became an orphan at the age of seven. He was brought up by an aunt, Miss Ann Speed. Having served as an apprentice to a local draper from the age of fourteen, he moved to London to become a silk buyer in the capital, working in Peter Robinson's Department Store at Oxford Circus by the time he was 20.

== Business career ==
=== Formation of John Lewis ===
In 1864 John Lewis opened his own small drapery shop, John Lewis & Co., at 132 Oxford Street (later renumbered), on part of the same site as the present John Lewis department store. The business flourished and expanded and was rebuilt in the 1880s to form an all-encompassing department store.

=== Further purchases ===
It is said that in 1905 John Lewis walked from Oxford Street to Sloane Square with twenty £1000 notes in his pocket and bought Peter Jones. Sales at Peter Jones had been falling since 1902 and its new owner failed to reverse the trend. In 1914 he handed control of the store to his son Spedan.

=== Dispute with Lord Howard de Walden ===
Lewis engaged in a protracted legal dispute with the ground landlord of his Holles Street premises, Lord Howard de Walden. The litigation went through the courts for twenty-three years and cost Lewis £40,000. At one point he was sent to Brixton Jail for contempt of court, and Howard de Walden sued him for libel following his erection of placards at his stores. The case was eventually settled amicably.

=== Management style ===
Lewis was regarded as an autocratic employer, prone to dismissing staff arbitrarily. The stores had difficulty retaining staff (there was a strike in 1920) and performed poorly compared to his rivals such as Whiteleys, Gorringes and Owen Owen. His management style led to conflict with his sons who disagreed with his business methods. It was only after his death that the company was transformed into the John Lewis Partnership, a worker co-operative.

== Political career ==
Politically, Lewis was a Liberal. In 1888 he was nominated to St Marylebone Vestry, and remained a member of that body, and the successor Metropolitan Borough Council until 1919. From 1901– 1907 he was a member of the London County Council, representing West Marylebone on behalf of the Liberal-backed majority Progressive Party.

== Personal life ==
In 1884 John Lewis married Eliza Baker, a schoolmistress from a family of West Country drapers and alumna of Girton College, Cambridge (1873–1877). They had two children, John Spedan, born 1885, and Oswald, born 1887. John Lewis remained in full control of his Oxford Street store until his death. He died at his Hampstead home "Spedan Towers" in 1928 at the age of 92.
