= Peter Jones & Partners =

Department store in London

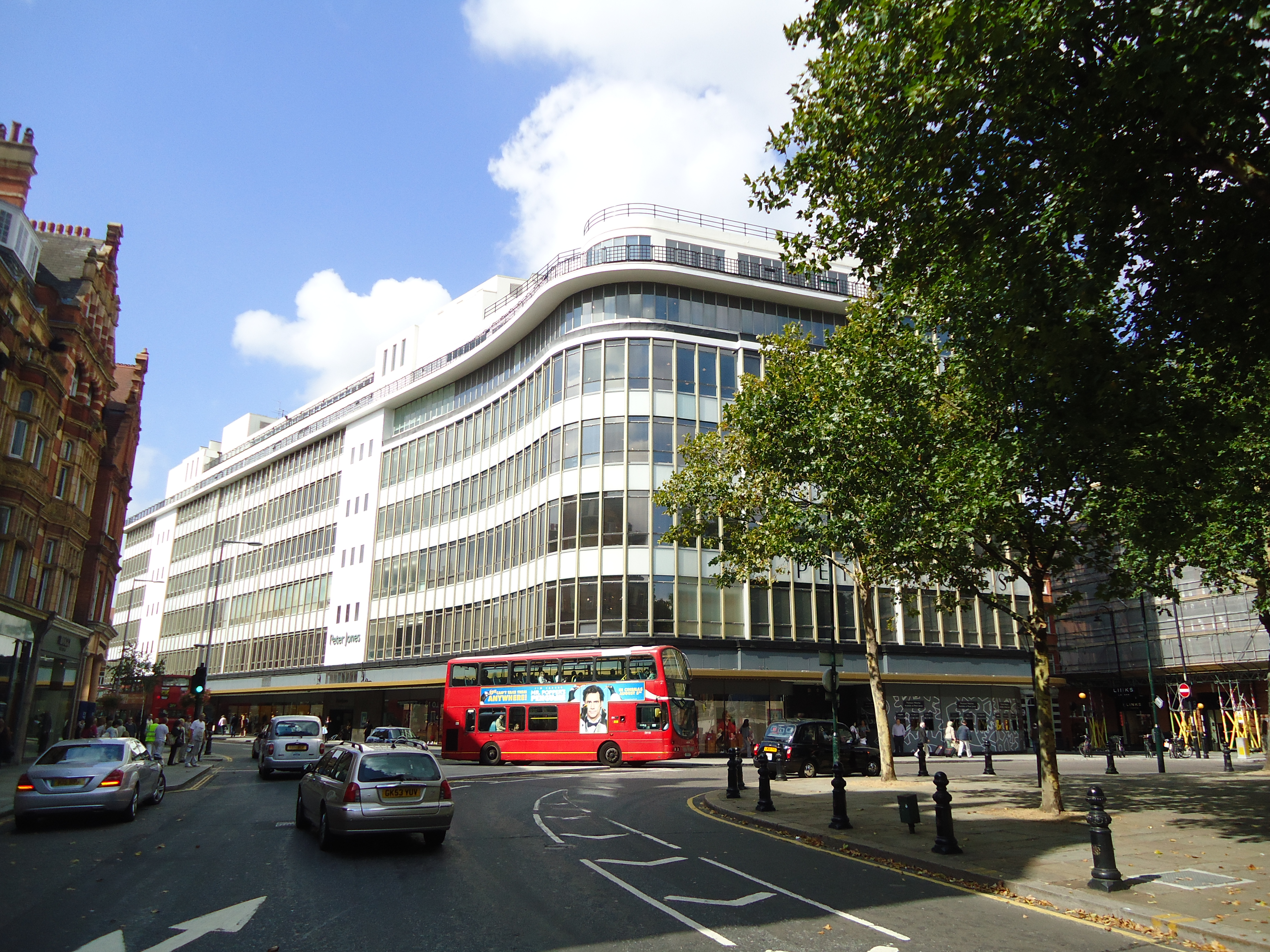
- Exterior of Peter Jones (2011)

General information
- Status: Open
- Type: Department store
- Architectural style: Modernist
- Location: Sloane Square, London, England
- Coordinates: 51.4922°N 0.1590°W
- Named for: Peter Jones
- Year built: 1932–1936
- Opened: 1936; 90 years ago
- Renovated: 1999–2004
- Renovation cost: £107 million
- Client: John Spedan Lewis
- Owner: John Lewis & Partners (John Lewis Partnership)

Technical details
- Floor count: 7
- Floor area: 170,000 square feet (16,000 m^{2}) of selling space

Design and construction
- Architect: William Crabtree
- Architecture firm: Slater, Crabtree and Moberly

Renovating team
- Architect: John McAslan

Other information
- Public transit: Sloane Square: Circle line; District line

Website
- johnlewis.com/our-shops/peter-jones

Listed Building – Grade II*
- Official name: Peter Jones Store
- Designated: 7 November 1984
- Reference no.: 1226626

Peter Jones & Partners (formerly and still colloquially Peter Jones) is a Grade II listed department store in Sloane Square in Chelsea, London, England. It was designed by William Crabtree for John Spedan Lewis, and opened in 1936; it replaced the first store on the grounds founded by Peter Jones in 1877. It is owned by the John Lewis Partnership, which also owns the John Lewis department store and the Waitrose supermarket chains.

== History ==
The shop is named after Peter Rees Jones (1842–1905), the son of a Carmarthenshire hat manufacturer. After serving an apprenticeship with a draper in Cardigan, Jones moved to London and established a small shop in Marylebone Lane. He then moved to central London, and in 1877, he moved to 4–6 King's Road, the current site of the store. The business flourished, soon expanding to cover most of the block, occupied on a 999-year lease from the Cadogan estate at £6,000 per year, the terms of which have never been increased.

After a period of troubled trading and Jones' death, the store was purchased by John Lewis of the eponymous Oxford Street store, who handed it over to his son John Spedan Lewis in 1914. Soon after, it became part of the John Lewis profit sharing partnership. In 2009, Simon Fowler was appointed managing director, overseeing a two-year period of growth where sales and profits reached record levels. This period also spanned Peter Jones' 100th anniversary of its membership at the John Lewis Partnership, where it is widely recognised to be the birthplace of the democratic employee ownership structure still found in the retailer today. Tony Wheeler was appointed managing director in 2011.

== Architecture ==
The present building, which occupies an entire island site on the west side of Sloane Square, was built between 1932 and 1936 to designs by William Crabtree of the firm of Slater, Crabtree and Moberly. The building is the first modern-movement use of the glass curtain wall in Britain (not, as is often claimed, the first per se, as late-Victorian examples in the Gothic Revival style exist) and is now a Grade II* listed building.

Old logo used from 2000 to 2018

The store completed a lengthy refurbishment by John McAslan and Partners in 2004.

== Customers ==
The store holds two royal warrants granted by Charles, then Prince of Wales, and Prince Philip, Duke of Edinburgh.
