= Longstock =

Village and parish in Hampshire, England

Coordinates: 51.13197°N 1.48616°W

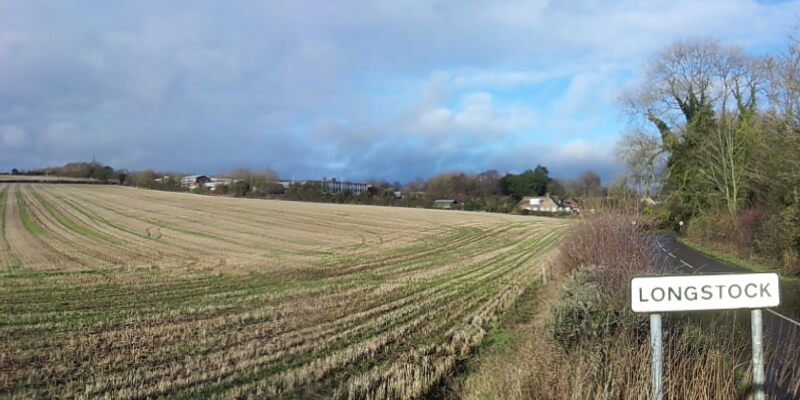
- Village sign

- Location within Hampshire
- Population: 451; 457 (2011 Census)
- OS grid reference: SU359371
- Civil parish: Longstock
- District: Test Valley
- Shire county: Hampshire
- Region: South East
- Country: England
- Sovereign state: United Kingdom
- Post town: STOCKBRIDGE
- Postcode district: SO20
- Dialling code: 01264
- Police: Hampshire and Isle of Wight
- Fire: Hampshire and Isle of Wight
- Ambulance: South Central
- UK Parliament: Romsey

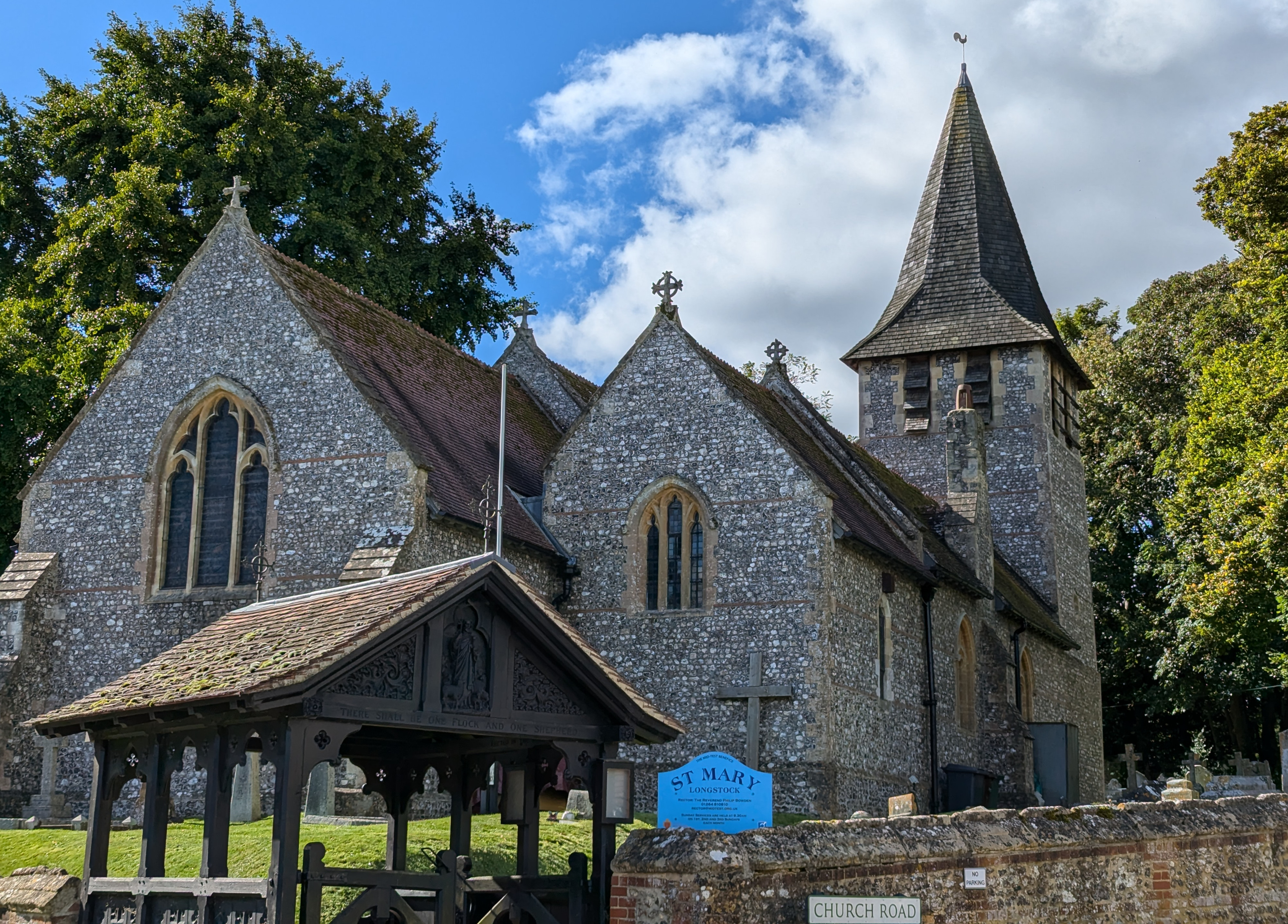
The C19 rebuild of St. Mary's church at Longstock, Hampshire, England. September 2024.

Longstock is a village and civil parish in Hampshire, England. It lies on the western bank of the River Test, to the north of Stockbridge and to the west of Leckford. The parish has a population of around 450. The parish church, St Mary's, was largely rebuilt in the 1880s.

The parish contains Longstock Park which adjoins the Leckford Estate; both are owned by the John Lewis Partnership.

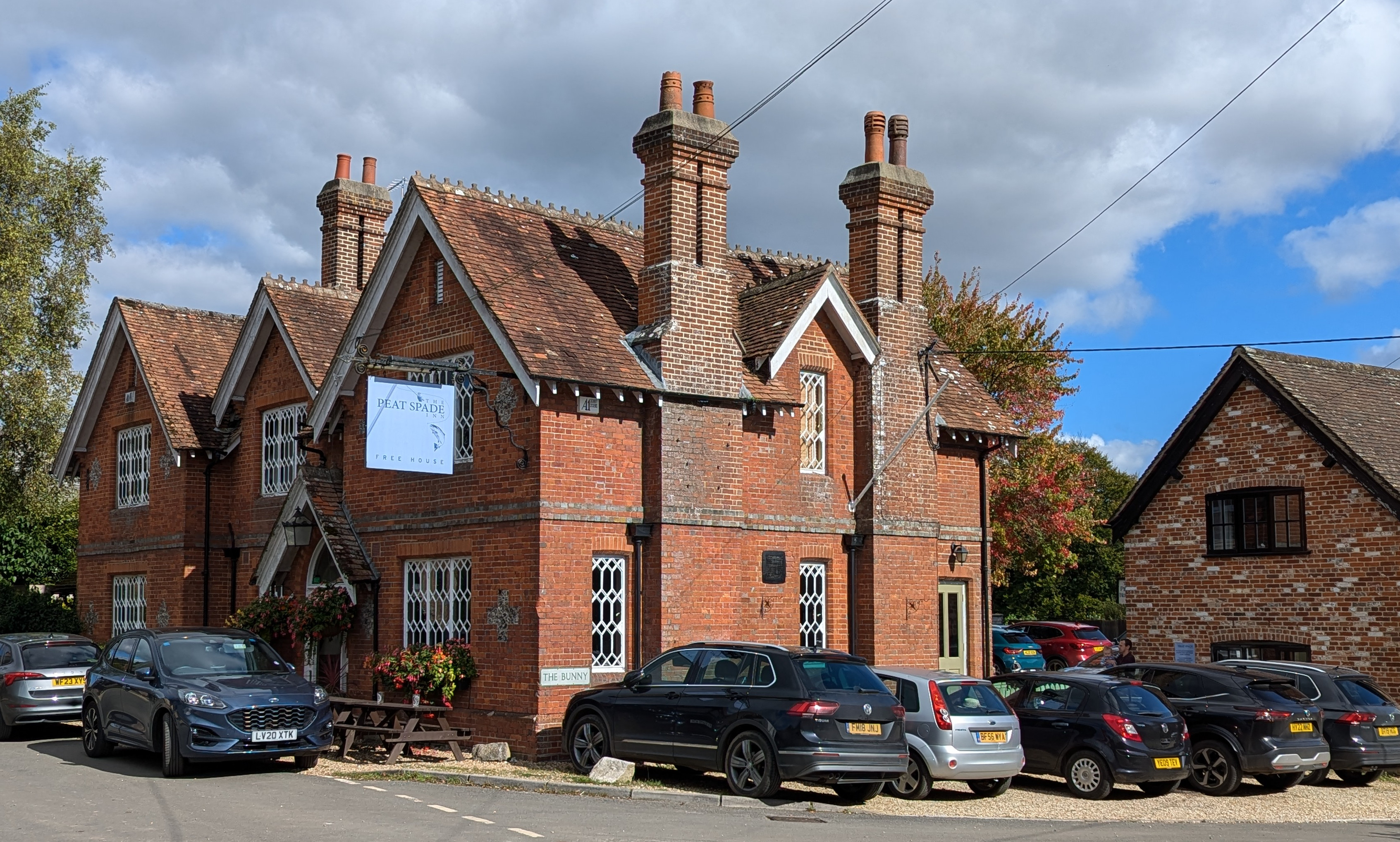
The Peat Spade, restaurant and free house at Longstock, Hampshire, England. September 2024.

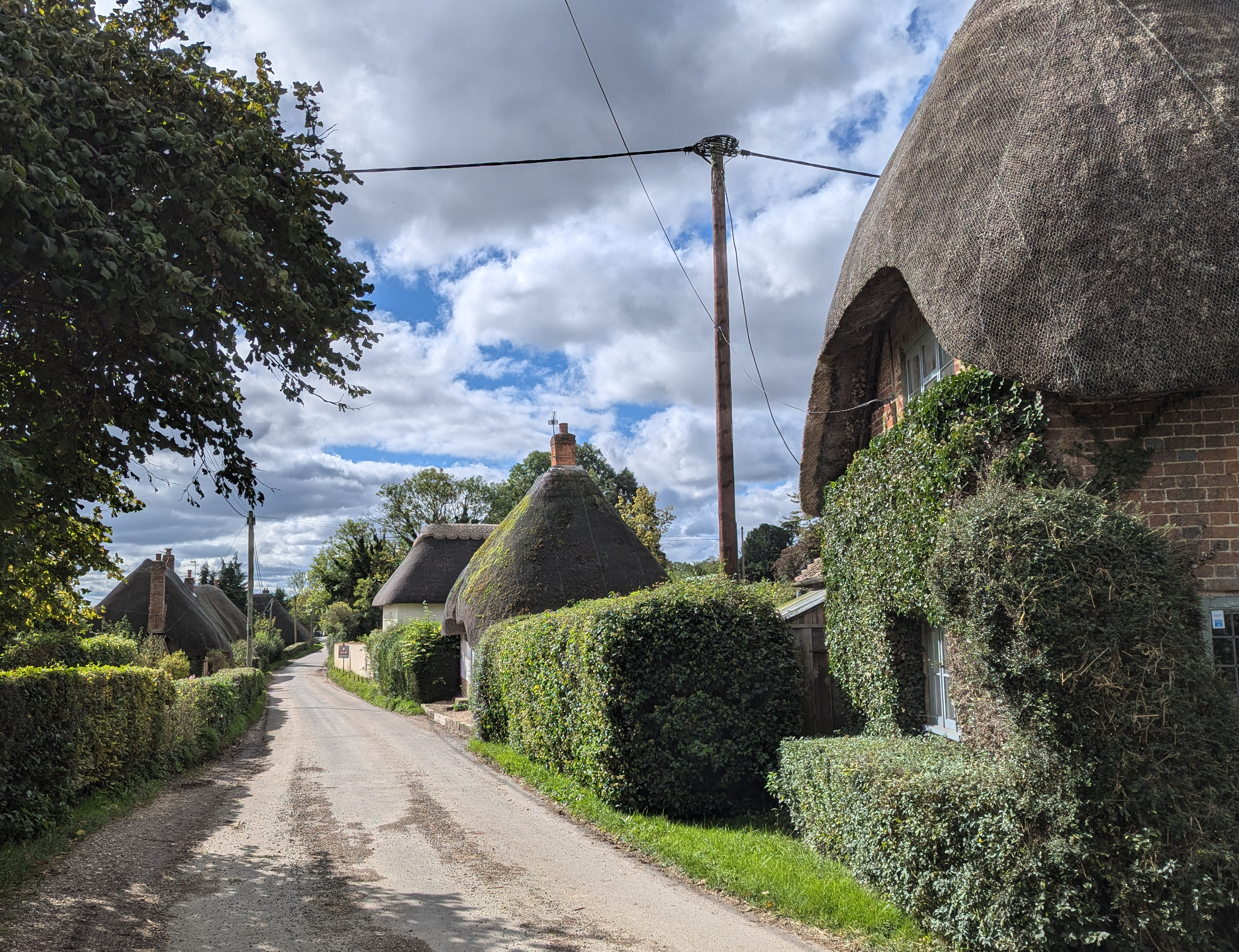
Thatched cottages at Longstock, Hampshire, England. September 2024.

The village has a gastropub / freehouse called "The Peat Spade", which is one of the few buildings in the village which is not a thatched cottage.
