= E-skills UK =

The Tech Partnership
- Formation: 1 April 2003; 23 years ago
- Type: Sector skills council
- Legal status: Not-for-profit company limited by guarantee
- Purpose: IT training and participation in the UK
- Location: London, SW1
- Region served: UK
- Chief Executive: Karen Price OBE
- Parent organization: UK Commission for Employment and Skills
- Affiliations: National Skills Academy for IT, Skills for Business
- Website: Tech Partnership

The Tech Partnership (formerly e-skills UK) is the United Kingdom (UK)'s sector skills council for the information technology (IT) industry, also known as "Business and Information Technology" or "IT & Telecoms." It is based in central London. Karen Price OBE is the chief executive officer.

The not-for-profit organisation works to co-operatively address technology-related skills issues through evidence-based advice, services and programmes. It is led by its constituency, to operate in the interests of employers by ensuring that the UK is equipped to compete in the worldwide digital economy.

e-skills UK aims to address the current and future needs of the Business and Information Technology sector in the UK, including skills shortages and gender inequality in the UK IT industry. The group publishes the e-skills Bulletin, and the Regional Gap-UK report on skills gaps. The Technology Insights report details which skills are most needed.

The group has also developed sets of qualifications for IT workers. The group devised the e-skills passport and IT User Qualification (ITQ) qualifications, as its National Occupational Standards.

== History ==
e-skills UK existed in name before 2003 as one of the National Training Organisations (NTO). Their website was launched in 2000.

The National Training Organisations became the Sector Skills Councils (SSC) in April 2003. SSCs were started by the Sector Skills Development Agency, under the leadership of chief executive being Christopher Duff. The numbers of the organisations reduced to 23, and funding was increased. e-skills UK was one of the first Councils to be formed. e-skills UK was initially given a five-year licence to be the SSC for the IT and Telecoms industry, under the leadership of Karen Price. In March 2005 e-skills UK was one of four SSCs to publish their first Sector Skills Agreement, outlining what they hoped to realistically achieve; the other councils to publish agreements at that time were the Sector Skills Council for Science, Engineering and Manufacturing Technologies (SEMTA), Skillset and ConstructionSkills.

Computer Clubs for Girls, or CC4G, began in South East England in 2002, designed to educate girls about the potential of technology. The pilot scheme started in 280 schools, with £2.8 million funding by SEEDA, and run by Melody Hermon. Computer Clubs for Girls was launched nationwide on 14 June 2005 for girls aged 10–14 at 3,600 schools, and cost £8.5 million. By 2006, around 1,000 schools had registered and 58,000 girls were in the scheme.

In the 2006 Birthday Honours Karen Price, chief executive officer of e-skills UK, received an Order of the British Empire (OBE).

In 2009, e-skills UK was rated 'outstanding' in the process to re-license Sector Skills Councils.

In August 2009, e-skills UK developed a £5.6 million scheme with the Open University called Vital, to train school teachers on technology in a form of continuing professional development (CPD). Vital was launched at the annual BETT trade show.

In February 2010 e-skills UK, Google and BT Group formed the Getting British Business Online project (GBBO). In the same year, the group reported that the UK IT industry was around 8% of the UK economy, and covered 5.7% of the working population (IT and telecoms). 860,000 persons worked in the IT industry, plus another approximately 680,000 in IT-related positions. The report concluded that "continued adoption and exploitation of IT & Telecoms technologies could generate an additional £35 billion to the UK economy."

== See also ==
- British Computer Society (BCS)
- Becta
