= Skills for Business =

The Skills for Business network is an umbrella organisation for the twenty-five Sector Skills Councils in the United Kingdom.

== History ==
The whole set of SSCs are funded by the UK Commission for Employment and Skills.

== Sector Skills Councils ==
- Skills CFA - business skills
- People 1st - hospitality, leisure, travel and tourism www.people1st.co.uk
- Skills for Care and Development
- Skillsmart Retail
- Skillset - creative industry
- GoSkills
- Construction Skills
- The Institute of the Motor Industry (formerly Automotive Skills)
- SEMTA
- Financial Services Skills Council
- Creative & Cultural Skills - advertising
- Skills for Justice
- Cogent - chemicals and pharmaceuticals
- Skills for Health
- Lifelong Learning UK
- e-skills UK - IT industry
- Skillfast-UK - fashion - closed 31 March 2010 and merged with Skillset
- Energy and Utility Skills
- Lantra - environment and rural
- Improve Ltd - food and drink manufacturing
- SkillsActive - sport
- Proskills UK
- SummitSkills - building services engineering (air conditioning and refrigeration, electrotechnical, heating and ventilating, and plumbing) www.summitskills.org.uk
- Asset Skills - property management
- Skills for Logistics
- Government Skills - central government
