= John Lewis Partnership =

British retail company

John Lewis Partnership plc
- Formerly: The John Lewis Partnership Limited (1929–1982)
- Type: Public limited company
- Industry: Retail, financial services, build to rent
- Founded: 23 April 1929; 97 years ago in London, England
- Founder: John Spedan Lewis
- Headquarters: Pimlico, City of Westminster, London
- Key people: Jason Tarry (Chairman); Rita Clifton (Deputy Chairman); Peter Ruis (Managing Director)
- Products: Fashion; Electronics; Homeware; Food; Drink; Financial services; Property
- Revenue: ▲£12.426 billion (FY2023/24)
- Operating income: ▲£0.147 billion (FY2023/24)
- Number of employees: 74,000 (2024)
- Subsidiaries: Waitrose & Partners; John Lewis & Partners; Opun Home Improvements
- Website: johnlewispartnership.co.uk

John Lewis Partnership PLC is a British company that operates John Lewis & Partners department stores, Waitrose supermarkets, financial services and a build to rent operation. The public limited company is owned by a trust on behalf of all its employees, known as Partners, who share the responsibilities and rewards of ownership. John Lewis has around 74,000 employees as of 2024.

== History ==
=== 1860s origins ===
John Lewis opened a drapery shop at 132 Oxford Street, London, in 1864. Born in Shepton Mallet in Somerset in 1836, he had been apprenticed at 14 to a linen draper in Wells. He came to London in 1856 and worked as a salesman for Peter Robinson, an Oxford Street draper, rising to be his silk buyer. In 1864, he declined Robinson's offer of a partnership, and rented his own premises on the north side of Oxford Street, on part of the site now occupied by the department store which bears his name. There he sold silk and woollen cloth and haberdashery. His retailing philosophy was to buy good quality merchandise and sell it at a modest 'mark up'. Although he carried a wide range of merchandise, he was less concerned about displaying it and never advertised it. His skill lay in sourcing the goods he sold, and most mornings he would go to the City of London, accompanied by a man with a hand barrow. Later he would make trips to Paris to buy silks.

Lewis spurned holidays and games and devoted himself entirely to the business, which was successful. He invested the money he made from it in residential and small retail properties, many of which he never visited. He expanded the Oxford Street business by renting neighbouring properties on Oxford Street and then along Holles Street, and gradually moved into other classes of merchandise: first the new area of ready-made women's apparel, and later children's wear and furniture. He never held 'sales', saying that he was intent on building a sound, permanent business.

In 1884, aged 48, Lewis married Eliza Baker, a schoolmistress with a university education, who was 18 years his junior. They set up home in a mansion on the edge of Hampstead Heath, for which Lewis made up the name Spedan Tower after his aunt, Ann Speed, and when Eliza bore a son in 1885, he was called John Spedan Lewis. A second son, Oswald Lewis, was born in 1887. After Westminster School, both sons joined Lewis in the business, and he gave each of them a quarter share of it on their twenty-first birthdays.

=== 1900s family disagreements ===
There was constant quarrelling between Lewis and his sons. By 1909, Oswald wanted out, and Lewis senior reluctantly agreed to buy back Oswald's quarter share of the business for £50,000 (equivalent to about £4.5 million in 2010). Oswald went to study at the Faculty of Law, University of Oxford, qualified as a barrister, and became a cavalry officer in 1914. He was injured and discharged in 1916, whereupon he accepted an invitation from his father to rejoin the business.

Lewis had several run-ins with Lord Howard de Walden, his Oxford Street landlord, and in 1903 he spent three weeks in Brixton Prison for defying a court order obtained by de Walden. In 1911, de Walden sued him for libel. Lewis was found guilty, but the jury awarded damages of just a farthing.

In 1906, Lewis bought a controlling interest in the Sloane Square–based business Peter Jones Limited, named after the eponymous founder Peter Rees Jones who had died the previous year. Lewis walked from Oxford Street with the £20,000 purchase price in banknotes.

=== 1910s ===
For the next 13 years, the Peter Jones business was unprofitable – no dividends were paid to Lewis and the external shareholders – and in desperation, in 1914 Lewis appointed his son Spedan as chairman of Peter Jones. This gave Spedan Lewis complete control, and he decided that the underlying problem was that the staff had no incentive to do a good day's work because their own interests were not in line with those of the business. He shortened their working day and instituted a system of commission for each department, paying selling staff amounts based on turnover. He held regular meetings at which staff could air any grievances directly with him. In 1916, after a disagreement with his father, Spedan Lewis exchanged his 25% interest in the Oxford Street business for Lewis's shares in Peter Jones Limited. He made improvements in staff conditions, including granting a third week's paid holiday each year. He had hot and cold running water installed in the staff bedrooms over the shop. In 1918, he started publishing a fortnightly newspaper telling staff how the business was faring. In 1919, he instituted a staff council meeting, the first decision of which was that staff should be paid weekly instead of four-weekly. The business prospered: there was a profit of £20,000 in 1920. Spedan Lewis's radical idea was that the profits generated by the business should not be paid solely to shareholders as a reward for their capital. Shareholders should receive a reasonable but limited return, and labour should be the recipient of the excess. His concept of 'fairer shares' involved sharing gain, knowledge, and power. In 1920, Spedan started distributing Peter Jones preference shares to staff, who were referred to as Partners.

=== 1920s ===
The early 1920s were not successful for Peter Jones. Dividends on preference shares, many of which were held by employees, were not paid. In 1924, there was a reconciliation between John Lewis and Spedan Lewis. Trade at Oxford Street had fared better, and John Lewis made a cash injection into the Sloane Square business.

In 1925, Spedan Lewis devised the slogan "never knowingly undersold" at Peter Jones. Intended mainly as a control on sourcing merchandise, it also meant that customers could shop knowing that they were not paying more at Peter Jones than they could buy identical goods for at other stores. This principle, which was refined several times, most notably to exclude retailers who trade only online and to include extended insurance and delivery charges when comparing prices, was honoured until August 2022, when it was replaced with a general commitment to providing competitive value on its own-label merchandise. In 2024, the slogan returned and the customer price promise was refined once more.

By 1926, Lewis senior was 90, Spedan was impatient to gain control of John Lewis in Oxford Street so that he could implement his radical ideas there, and Oswald again wanted out. Without telling their father, Spedan took out a bank loan and bought out Oswald's inheritance. After going around the world, Oswald embarked on a political career, becoming Conservative Party MP for Colchester in 1929, and holding the seat until 1945. Spedan Lewis became the sole owner in the Oxford Street business after John Lewis died aged 92 in 1928.

In 1929, Spedan Lewis signed a deed of settlement, which transferred shares in John Lewis & Co. Limited and Peter Jones Limited to trustees. The profits of the combined business would be distributed to its employees, either as cash or as fixed-interest stock in the new company: John Lewis Partnership Limited.

=== 1930s expansion ===
In 1933, John Lewis started acquiring other retail businesses, buying Jessop & Son of Nottingham, and Lance & Lance of Weston-super-Mare. In 1934, it acquired Knight & Lee in Southsea, and Tyrrell & Green in Southampton. It also started rebuilding Peter Jones to a modern design. In 1937, it bought Waitrose, which operated ten counter-service grocery shops in London and the home counties.

=== 1940s and the Second World War ===
The biggest acquisition came in 1940 when John Lewis bought Selfridge Provincial Stores Limited, which owned 16 shops: John Barnes in Hampstead, Blinkhorn & Son in Gloucester and Stroud, Bon Marché in Brixton, Buckleys in Harrogate, A H Bull in Reading, Caleys in Windsor, Cole Brothers in Sheffield, Holdrons in Peckham, Jones Brothers in Holloway, George Henry Lee in Liverpool, Pratts in Streatham, Quin & Axten in Brixton, Robert Sayle in Cambridge, Thomsons in Peterborough and Trewin Brothers in Watford, substantially increasing the size of the business.

The Second World War took its toll, and several stores were damaged by bombing, notably the 'west house' of John Lewis in Oxford Street (on the west side of Holles Street), which was lost completely in September 1940.

=== 1950s ===
In 1950, Spedan Lewis executed a second deed of settlement, which passed ownership of John Lewis to trustees to hold for the benefit of those who worked in the business. He continued to manage it as if he were still the owner, saying in 1957 that it was necessary to concentrate management in one pair of hands.

Spedan Lewis also retained for himself the right to choose his successor when he retired on his 70th birthday in 1955. He had originally intended that Michael Watkins, his right-hand man for many years, would succeed him as chairman, but Watkins died in 1950. Spedan asked his son, Edward Lewis, if he would fill the role, but he declined. Spedan appointed a loyal, long-serving lieutenant, Bernard Miller, but expressed the hope that in due course Edward would succeed Miller as chairman. In the event, Miller was succeeded by Peter Lewis, the son of Oswald Lewis.

In 1953 John Lewis sold several small stores but acquired two large ones: Heelas in Reading and Bainbridge in Newcastle upon Tyne. The rebuilt store on Oxford Street was reopened in 1960, and the sculpture Winged Figure by Barbara Hepworth was added in 1963.

=== 2000s ===
To accommodate national advertising, in 2002, the company began the process of renaming department stores not branded as John Lewis (Tyrrell & Green, Heelas, etc.) with the nationally recognisable name. Peter Jones in London remains the sole exception to this policy. The company experimented with smaller format stores, adding 12 At Home shops and 2 Convenience-driven stores, alongside 3 more full-line department stores (Leeds, Stratford, Birmingham).

John Lewis faced a series of strikes in 2012 and 2013 by cleaners, who had been outsourced, regarding pay.

The group made its first-ever half-year operating loss of £26 million in the first half of 2019. During the COVID-19 pandemic, 16 loss-making John Lewis stores were closed.

In December 2020, John Lewis appointed Rita Clifton as deputy chairman.

In June 2025, the company appointed Anna Braithwaite as its chief commercial officer, effective from 1 October 2025.

== Corporate affairs ==
=== Senior leadership ===
The company is overseen by the chairman, who is responsible for the overall success of the business.

==== Chairmen ====
1. John Spedan Lewis (1929–1955)
2. Sir Bernard Miller (1955–1972)
3. Peter Lewis (1972–1993)
4. Sir Stuart Hampson (1993–2007)
5. Sir Charlie Mayfield (2007–2020)
6. Dame Sharon White (2020–2024)
7. Jason Tarry (since September 2024)

==== Chief executives ====
In March 2023, a chief executive was hired for the first time, making Nish Kankiwala responsible for day-to-day operations of the partnership as delegated by the chairman. However, this role was eliminated in October 2024 by new chairman Jason Tarry, with Kankiwala due to complete his two-year contract and step down in March 2025.

=== Employee representation ===
The highest level of the John Lewis democratic structure is the Partnership Council, a directly elected body of 58 Partners who both represent opinions from across the Partnership and hold the Chairman to account for their running of the business. Partnership Councillors are company insiders with voting rights, and the only body within the company's governance structures with the power to remove the Chairman from office. Biannually the Council conducts a "Holding to Account" session where the Chairman fields questions from representatives in an open meeting, following which a vote is held which indicates whether or not Councillors support the Chairman's leadership and the progress of the business.

Further to this structure, the Partnership Council elects three directors to the "Partnership Board". The three Elected Directors join the Chairman, Deputy Chairman, Executive Director Finance, and two further Non-Executive Directors to form the Partnership Board. The Council also elects three individuals to act as Trustees of the John Lewis Partnership.

Employees of John Lewis usually receive an annual bonus, akin to a share of the profit. It is calculated as a percentage of salary, with the same percentage awarded to all employees. The bonus is dependent on the profitability of John Lewis each year varying historically between 5% and 20% of Partners' annual salaries, but falling to 3% in 2019 in light of tough trading conditions. The annual bonus dropped to 2% in 2020 and it was confirmed that no bonus would be paid in 2021 in light of the COVID-19 pandemic. This was the first time since 1953 that the bonus had not been paid. The bonus returned in 2022 paid at a rate of 3%.

In 1999, in response to a fall in profits, there were calls from some employees for the business to undertake an initial public offering and float on the stock market. If this had gone through, each employee stood to receive a windfall averaging £100,000. A company-wide ballot was held regarding the matter which did not approve the proposals.

In 2023, the early stages of a plan to sell shares were explored but no action was taken.

== Retail operations ==
=== John Lewis & Partners ===
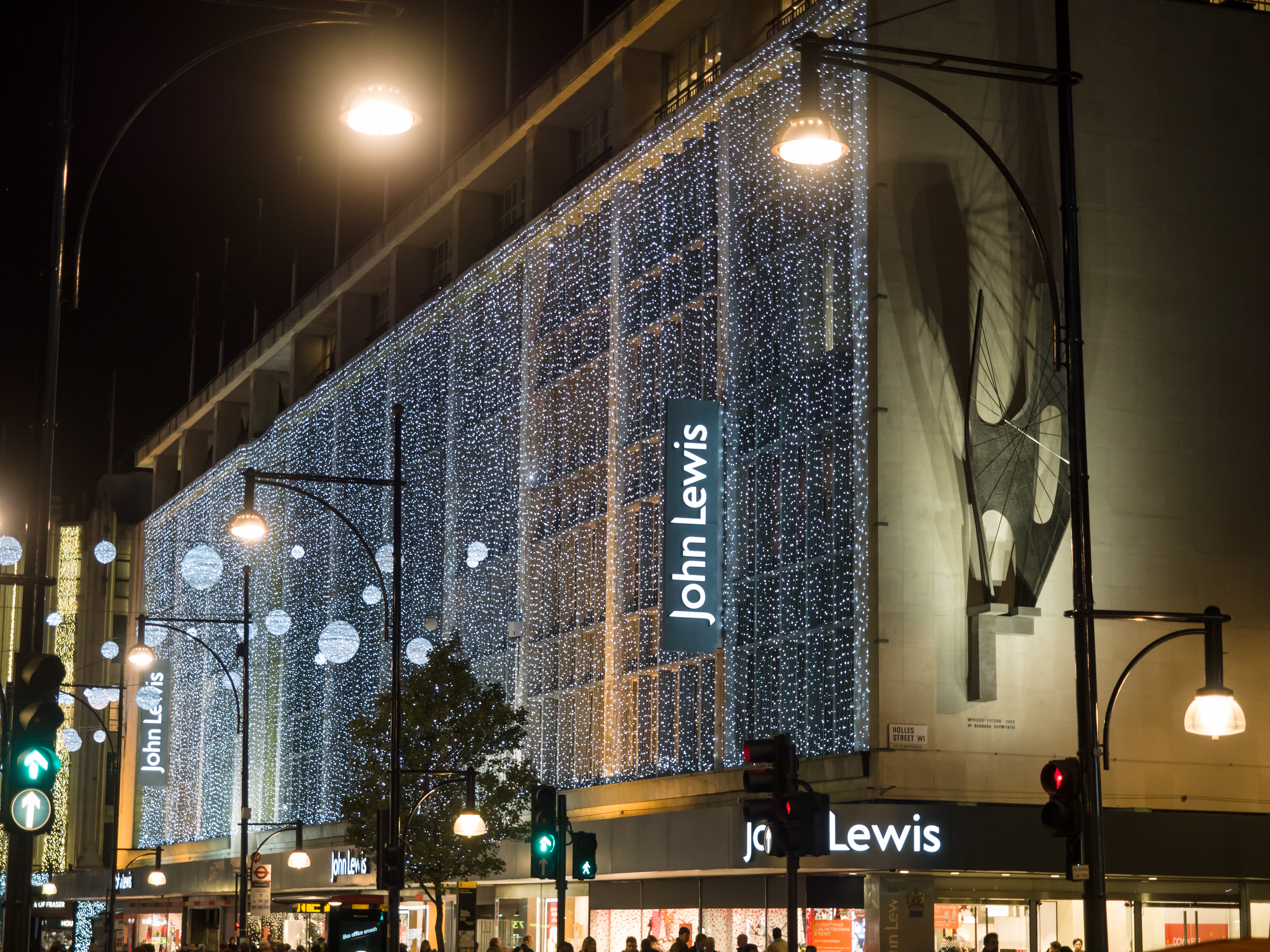
John Lewis & Partners' flagship department store on Oxford Street, London

In 2012, the John Lewis division operated 30 full-line department stores, one John Lewis Click and Commute at St Pancras railway station, one John Lewis convenience store at Heathrow Airport, 10 John Lewis at Home Stores, and a web store. The stores are in a mixture of city centre and out-of-town shopping centre locations. The flagship Oxford Street store in London remains the largest John Lewis outlet in the UK.

'John Lewis at Home' stores cater for areas which have no large John Lewis department store near them. The first store opened in Poole in October 2009. They are around a third the size of a normal department store, and have both Home and Electrical departments with services such as a cafe and 'click and collect' also available. A new 'flexible format' store was trialled in Exeter in 2012, with a full line of stock in a smaller physical store, relying heavily on 'click and collect' or next day delivery, both in-store and to homes.

=== Peter Jones & Partners ===
Peter Jones is a large department store in central London. It is a John Lewis store and is located on Sloane Square, at the junction of King's Road and Sloane Street, in the Chelsea district, close to the Belgravia and Knightsbridge districts. Peter Jones was founded as an independent store but was bought by John Lewis, owner of the eponymous store in Oxford Street, in 1905. In 1929 Lewis's son, John Spedan Lewis, who then owned both businesses, combined them into a single business.

=== Waitrose & Partners ===
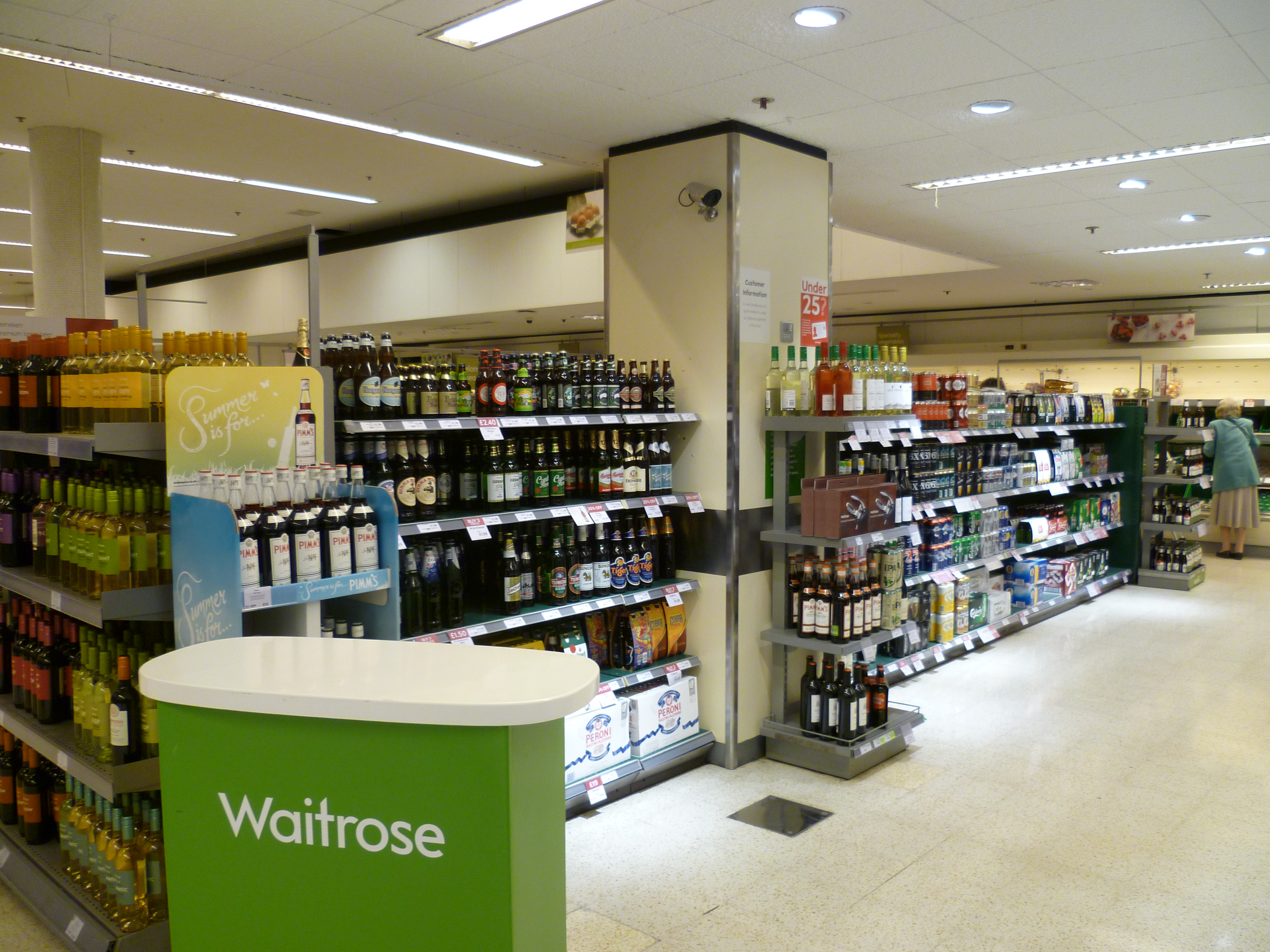
Interior of a Waitrose & Partners store in Enfield

John Lewis Partnership also owns Waitrose & Partners, an upmarket supermarket chain that had 332 branches and 78,000 employees as of early 2021. Waitrose trades mainly in London and the south of England, and was originally formed by Wallace Waite, Arthur Rose, and David Taylor. The company was taken over by John Lewis Partnership in 1937.

== Other services and operations ==
=== John Lewis Finance ===
In June 2004, John Lewis Partnership launched its own credit card, branded Partnership Card, provided by HSBC UK. The card was launched to complement the existing John Lewis and Waitrose account cards. It was announced in May 2022 that the white-label agreement with HSBC would end later that year, with new and existing Partnership Card accounts migrated to a reshaped service run by British financial services company NewDay.

The company has provided insurance products since it launched Greenbee in October 2006. Later, the Greenbee brand was retired and the services rebranded John Lewis Finance. Initially, it offered home, travel, wedding and events insurance as well as a travel and tickets service. It subsequently expanded to offer other services including car insurance and policies for second homes. John Lewis Finance later branched out into providing pet insurance, as well as creating John Lewis Investments, in partnership with Nutmeg.

In October 2021, John Lewis Finance released a home insurance advertisement showing a boy in make-up and a dress vandalising his house. The advertisement was banned by the Financial Conduct Authority as misleading, because the insurance plan did not include deliberate damage, as portrayed.

=== Telecoms ===
John Lewis offered broadband and home telephone services via a white-label agreement with Plusnet. The service closed to new customers in October 2022 and, following this, to existing customers when they reached the end of their contract.

=== Manufacturing ===
John Lewis Partnership currently operates one manufacturing business: Herbert Parkinson, in Darwen, Lancashire. This company, established as a weaver of jacquard fabrics in 1934, was acquired by John Lewis in 1953. Herbert Parkinson produces John Lewis own-brand fabrics and curtains, as well as filled furnishing products such as cushions and pillows. The company operates a wholesale business to outside customers in addition to supplying John Lewis branches.

Until September 2007, the Partnership also owned two further textile production businesses: Carlisle-based printer Stead McAlpin (founded c. 1875, 200 workers) and Haslingden, Lancashire-based weaver J. H. Birtwistle.

The manufacture and sale of furnishing textiles was organised by the business Cavendish Textiles, produced under the trade name of 'Jonelle' from 1937, dropped in 2000 in favour of 'John Lewis'. Designers included many associated with Heal's, such as Lucienne Day and Pat Albeck, as well as Jacqueline Groag.

=== Supply chain ===
The company's "Better Jobs Programme" is concerned with the quality of employment within its UK own-brand and global supply chain. The programme has an online portal through which workers in the supply chain can comment on job design, health and well-being and worker voice initiatives.

== Ocado ==
In 2002, John Lewis Partnership helped finance the creation of Ocado, an independent online supermarket, and later transferred its interest to its pension fund, which owned 29% of Ocado. The fund fully divested itself of its final 10.4% share ownership in February 2011 for £152 million, which represented a total profit from the company's investment in Ocado of about £220 million. In September 2020, the Partnership's relationship with Ocado came to an end.

== See also ==
- Source, lifestyle magazine
