= NTO =

NTO may refer to:

- Nitrogen tetroxide, a hypergolic rocket propellant component
- National Training Organisation; for example e-skills UK
- National tourism organisation, members of the European Travel Commission
- Nationaltemplarorden, one of the original Swedish temperance movements that formed IOGT-NTO
- NTO_(musician), a French electronic music producer
