= Jason Tarry =

British businessperson

Chairman of the John Lewis Partnership
- Incumbent
- Assumed office 12 September 2024
- Deputy: Rita Clifton
- Preceded by: Sharon White

Personal details
- Born: 1967 (age 58–59) Tonbridge, Kent, UK
- Spouse: Cathryn
- Domestic partner: Fenella
- Children: 4
- Education: Maidstone Grammar School; Staffordshire University
- Website: https://www.linkedin.com/in/jason-tarry-483060309/

Jason Tarry (born 1967) is a British retail executive, and the chairman of the John Lewis Partnership.

== Early life ==
He was born in Tonbridge, Kent, and educated nearby at Maidstone Grammar School.

He graduated from Staffordshire University with a bachelor's degree in Business Studies in 1989.

== Career ==
Tarry joined the graduate trainee programme at grocery chain Tesco in 1990. He worked for the retailer in a number of roles for more than 33 years, stepping down from heading up its UK and Irish business in March 2024. In September 2024, he succeeded Sharon White to become the seventh chairman of the John Lewis Partnership.

== Personal life ==
Tarry was married to Cathryn, with whom he has three adult children. He now lives in North London with his partner Fenella and a young son.
