= Skills CFA =

Instructus Skills
- Industry: Education
- Founded: 1996
- Headquarters: Kettering, Northamptonshire
- Parent: Instructus
- Website: www.instructus-skills.org

Instructus Skills (formerly Skills CFA) is both the standard setting organisation for business skills and the largest apprenticeship-issuing authority in the United Kingdom by number of certificates issued. Instructus Skills has one of the largest organisational footprints of any standards-setting body or Sector Skills Council representing approximately 11 million UK employees working in pan-sector occupations, and developed apprenticeship frameworks which were expected to be started by over 122,000 learners during 2010–11.

Instructus Skills is a brand of Instructus, a registered charity dedicated to advancing education for the public benefit through the promotion of qualifications, training and skills. Established in 1996 under the name Council for Administration, the company later became CfA Business Skills @ Work, then Skills CFA before becoming Instructus Skills in 2017.

== Standards & Qualifications ==
Instructus Skills is responsible for overseeing the development of UK National Occupational Standards (NOS), National Vocational Qualifications (NVQ), and Scottish Vocational Qualifications (SVQ) for the following sectors:

- Business & Administration
- Consultancy & Business Support
- Contact Centre
- Customer Service
- Enterprise
- Governance
- Human Resources & Recruitment
- Industrial Relations
- Languages & Intercultural Learning
- Management & Leadership
- Marketing
- Sales

NOS define exactly what it is, in terms of performance and understanding, that individuals are expected to achieve when carrying out specific functions in the workplace. They help develop the Qualifications and Credit Framework (QCF) which provides the structure for creating and accrediting qualifications in England, Wales and Northern Ireland.

== Apprenticeships ==
Instructus Skills also develops UK apprenticeship frameworks and supplies research statistics for apprenticeship and workplace employment in the UK. They develop and certify the most apprenticeships in the UK, and have the largest apprenticeship remit of any skills body with 27% of all qualified apprentices in England having completed one of their business apprenticeships.

=== Higher Apprenticeships ===
Instructus Skills has developed UK higher apprenticeship programmes (equivalent to the first year of a degree course).

- Higher Apprenticeship in Project Management created in conjunction with the Association for Project Management
- Higher Apprenticeship in Human Resource Management in conjunction with the Chartered Institute of Personnel and Development
- Higher Apprenticeship in Recruitment in conjunction with the Recruitment & Employment Confederation
