= Fair Trade Federation =

American trade association promoting fair trade

The Fair Trade Federation
- Abbreviation: FTF
- Formation: 1994; 32 years ago
- Legal status: non-profit trade association
- Purpose: Fair trade businesses
- Location: Lancaster, Pennsylvania, United States
- Affiliations: World Fair Trade Organization
- Website: fairtradefederation.org

The Fair Trade Federation (FTF) is a North American nonprofit trade association that provides support to and promotes North American businesses that they identify as being fully committed to the principles of fair trade.

In this vein, it describes itself as "part of the global fair trade movement, promoting a system that aims to pay fair wages and create long-term, direct trading relationships based on dialogue, transparency, equity and respect."

== History ==
The FTF began through alliances formed in the late 1970s when individual alternative trade organizations began holding yearly conferences for groups working in fair trade. In 1994, the group incorporated formally as the North American Alternative Trade Organization (NAATO) and, the following year, changed its name to the Fair Trade Federation. Since then, FTF has focused on supporting businesses aligned with its fair trade ideology in order to expand markets for artisans and farmers around the world.

FTF has been an active member of the World Fair Trade Organization (formerly IFAT) for many years.

== Principles ==
FTF states that its members are required to commit to the following nine principles in all of their transactions:

- Create opportunities for economically and socially marginalized producers
- Develop transparent and accountable relationships
- Build capacity
- Promote fair trade
- Payment of a fair price
- Support safe and empowering working conditions
- Ensure the rights of children
- Cultivate environmental stewardship
- Respect cultural identity

== Membership ==
FTF members undergo a rigorous screening process to try to ensure adherence to the organization's principles. The Federation does not certify individual products, but instead evaluates an entire business for its commitment to Fair Trade.

FTF members include retailers, wholesalers of agricultural and handmade goods, cafés, and coffee shops.

== Activities ==
FTF runs annual conferences and offers resources to help entrepreneurs begin and strengthen their fair trade operations. It provides business owners with a forum through which to network with other fair trade businesses and raises awareness about the perceived importance of fair trade.

In Boston on September 10–12, 2010, FTF cosponsored the Fair Trade Futures Conference — the largest fair trade conference in North America at that time.

== Partners ==
- World Fair Trade Organization (formerly known as IFAT)
- Equiterre
- Green America
- World Fair Trade Organization - Asia
- International Resources for Fairer Trade (IRFT) India
- Cooperation for Fair Trade in Africa
- World Fair Trade Organization - Europe
- La Asociacion Latinoamericana de Comercio Justo
- Fair World Project

== See also ==
- Fair Trade USA
