= Cooperation for Fair Trade in Africa =

The Cooperation for Fair Trade in Africa (COFTA) is a regional forum and an institutional regional platform that advocates for African producers under principles of fair trade, defined by the alliance as the fair distribution of profits arising from international trade.

COFTA is structured as a national network of Fair Trade Organizations, Fair Trade Support Organizations, and Fair Trade Networks, all of which are certified members of the World Fair Trade Organization (WFTO). The COFTA network attempts to assist grassroots producers in the development of quality products, as well as provide market access support to create better trading conditions for sustainable infrastructure.

== History of COFTA ==
Established in 2004 by regional African producers, COFTA's main goal was to advocate for African producers. Thanks to the ratification of more Fair Trade recognized producers in the region, COFTA has become a continental Fair Trade Network. The COFTA business plan is based on network and member development, market access, advocacy and lobbying, and organizational growth and development.

In 2009, COFTA began work with Fair Trade producers to nurture the growth of 10 countries' networks and initiatives. These countries were Kenya, Tanzania, Uganda, Rwanda, Ethiopia, South Africa, Swaziland, Zimbabwe, Senegal and Egypt. The aim of those country networks was to provide a forum for cooperative support, conduct needs assessments among members, and develop a database of producers and their product within an area.

COFTA claims that the success of the wider fair trade community's goals relies upon the creation of support networks for all members and the continued maintenance of such relationships.

COFTA has expanded to 70 member organizations and businesses in 22 countries, with importers buying in Europe, North America, and the Pacific Rim. The organization's head office is located in Nairobi, Kenya. COFTA traded goods began as predominantly handicraft produce, but now include tea, coffee, vanilla, honey, dried fruit, juices, and textiles.

== COFTA Membership ==
An African producer can become a COFTA member by meeting certain criteria created by the organization in combination with the WFTO. To become an official Fair Trade Organization an individual or group must complete an application form, ratify with the Fair Trade code of practice, and provide a two-year trade history and legal standing accompanied by three referees who must be members of the WFTO.

=== List of COFTA Members ===
Country	COFTA Members
Botswana	San Arts and Crafts
Burkina Faso	Cercle des Secheurs (CDS)
Cameroon	Bamenda Handicraft Cooperative Society Ltd; Presbyterian Handicraft Centre (PRESCRAFT); Salma Farmers Association
Egypt	Fair Trade Egypt (FTE); Jirmit papyrus Group
Ethiopia	Muya Ethiopia
Ghana	Fair Trade Producer Society (Formerly Getrade (GH) Ltd Fps); Global Mamas Women in Progress; Trade Aid Integrated
Kenya	Bombolulu Workshops; Monda African Art Ltd; Bosinange Juakali Soapstone Smolart Self Help Group; Farmers Own Trading; Bawa La Tumaini; Basecamp Maasai Brand; Sanabora Design House; Mace Food Ltd; Honey Care Africa; Kisii Soapstone Carvers cooperative (KISCOP); Tabaka Riotoyo Youth Group; Kazuri 2000 Limited; Trinity Jewellery Crafts; Kenya Gatsby Trust; Undugu Society of Kenya (USK); Kisumu Innovation Centre Kenya (KICK); Wanasanaa Self Help Group; Machakos District Co-operative Union Ltd (MDCU); Beacon of Hope (BOH); Nyabigena Soapstone Carvers Organization; Mango True Mirage
Mauritius	Craft Aid (Mauritius) Co Ltd
Namibia	Mud hut Trading
Nigeria	Alternative Trade Network of Nigeria
Rwanda	Cards from Africa; Cooperative des Producteurs Artisanaux de Butare (COPABU)
Senegal	Diago (taf taf)
South Africa	Africa Home; Streetwires Artist Collective; Amwa Designs The African Toyshop; Phytotrade Africa; Glenart Trading (PTY) LTD; Ukuva iAfrica Foods cc Turqle Trading; Umtha Best Beads cc trading Streetwires Artist Collective; Glenart Trading (PTY) LTD; Township Patterns; The African Toyshop
Swaziland	Gone Rural; Tintsaba Crafts (Pty) Ltd; Ngwenya Glass; Swazi Candles (PTY) Ltd; Rosecraft Ltd; Eswatini Swazi Kitchen
Tanzania	Kagera Cooperative Union Ltd (KCU); Kwanza Collection Company LimitedGetting; Marvellous Flotea Co Ltd; Old is to Grow (GOIG) Society; Handicraft Marketing Company Tanzania Ltd. Handicrafts (MIKONO)
Uganda	Fruits of the Nile Ltd. Uganda Crafts 2000 Ltd. Mpanga Tea Factory; Mabale Growers Tea Factory; National Association of Women's Organisation (NAWOU)
Zimbabwe	Bastian; Speciality Foods of Africa Pvt Ltd; Dezign Incorporated (Pvt) Ltd Profile; Hand Made Papers of Africa (Mapepa)

== Programs ==
=== Rwanda producer Support Program ===
The Rwanda producer Support Program was designed to help producers create quality goods that would have a great chance of selling internationally, as well as educating said producers on how to engage in competitive global markets. The project was conducted from June 2008 to June 2011, where workshops and training sessions were provided for 50 handicraft producers, teaching the vital business, financial and people skills needed to develop and maintain efficient business models. The workshops, conducted by 18 specially trained staff, attempted to promote the Fair Trade model of equality within the workplace, as well as in the international market. The goal of this program was the creation of more adequate businesses that contributed further to the incomes of small Rwandan communities.

The Rwanda producer Support Program received a grant of £245,000 from the Big Lottery Fund (BIG), which was used to improve the business model of 50 handicraft businesses. From 2008 to 2011 the program created 1,178 jobs, and 49 of the businesses reported an increase in income.

=== Market Access Program (MAP) ===
Introduced in September 2009, the Market Access Program (MAP) is designed to increase the competitiveness of African Fair Trade producers in the global market. Twenty-four producers from Kenya, Uganda, Rwanda and Tanzania are currently involved in the MAP. The program's goal is a 25% increase of African products' share in mainstream and Fair Trade markets by 2012.
