= Trade as One =

American fair trade company founded in 2006

Trade as One is a Fair Trade company founded in 2006 by Nathan and Catherine George. The company’s mission is to break cycles of poverty and dependency in the developing world by promoting sustainable businesses. Trade as One does this by purchasing and selling fair trade products from more than 30 partnered producers via online and event sales throughout the USA. In 2010 the company opened a retail store. Trade as One also advocates for and educates about fair trade through large events, often with churches, and also via webinars. The company is a certified member of the Fair Trade Federation and each of its partnered producers adheres to Fair Trade principles.Trade as One is a Fair Trade company founded in 2006 by Nathan and Catherine George. The company’s mission is to break cycles of poverty and dependency in the developing world by promoting sustainable businesses. Trade as One does this by purchasing and selling fair trade products from more than 30 partnered producers via online and event sales throughout the USA. In 2010 the company opened a retail store. Trade as One also advocates for and educates about fair trade through large events, often with churches, and also via webinars. The company is a certified member of the Fair Trade Federation and each of its partnered producers adheres to Fair Trade principles.

== History ==
Trade as One was formed in 2006 and began operations from a garage in the San Francisco Bay Area of California. It now operates from a warehouse and office in Santa Cruz, CA. Trade as One is based on the premise that Fair Trade is a way to alleviate two major crises in our world - both the crisis of extreme poverty in many parts of the developing world, and the crisis of consumerism in the developed world by enabling people to connect their values and beliefs with the way their money is spent and thus enable positive change.

Prior to starting Trade as One, Nathan and Catherine George visited about 25 different ventures on the front lines of poverty that were using business to bring jobs to people otherwise on a dollar a day. What many of these groups needed was access to a market outside their borders, and a fairer footing in world trade. The desire to work with groups such as these led to the formation of Trade as One.

== Producers ==
Trade as One works with over 30 producers from more than 20 countries that address 3 specific crises.

- The HIV/AIDS pandemic
- The problem of human trafficking/slavery
- The problem of extreme poverty
