= University Technical College Lancashire =

UTC Lancashire

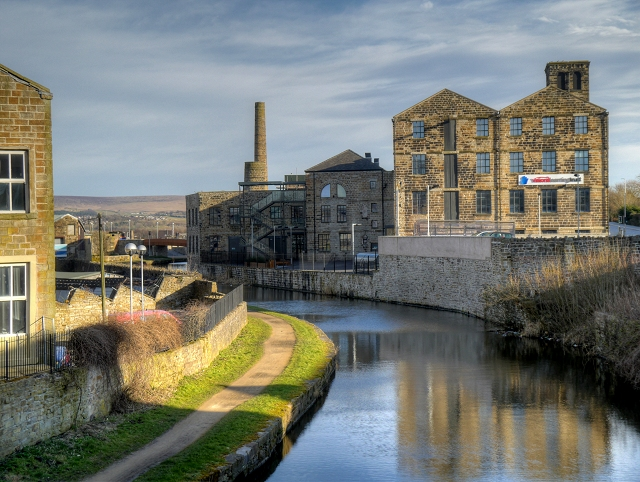

Location
- Trafalgar Street; Burnley, Lancashire, BB11 1RA; England; 53°47′22″N 2°15′14″W

Information
- Type: University Technical College
- Established: 2013
- Closed: 2017
- Department for Education URN: 139792 Tables
- Ofsted: Reports
- Chair of the Board: Gareth Smith
- Principal: Jacquie Petriaho
- Age: 14 to 19
- Enrolment: 113 (January 2016)
- Website: http://www.utclancashire.co.uk/

University Technical College Lancashire (or UTC Lancashire) was a university technical college (UTC) that opened in Burnley, Lancashire, England in August 2013. It was located on Trafalgar Street in Burnley, in the historic Victoria Mill which was extensively redeveloped and converted for use by the UTC. The college closed in August 2017.

== Sponsors ==
University of Central Lancashire was the university sponsor of UTC Lancashire, while the National Skills Academy for Nuclear, North West Aerospace Alliance and the Chartered Institute of Logistics and Transport were the strategic sponsors of the UTC.

Employer sponsors of UTC Lancashire included Chubb Systems, Cobham plc, Electricity North West, Enterprise plc, National Grid plc, Rolls-Royce plc, Safran Aircelle and Unison Industries.

== Admissions ==
UTC Lancashire had an initial intake of students aged 14 and 16 (academic years 10 and 12) in 2013, but expanded to accommodate students aged 14 to 19.

The primary catchment area of the UTC was a 15-mile radius from the location of the UTC, which includes all of the Borough of Burnley and parts of Hyndburn, Pendle, Ribble Valley and Rossendale in Lancashire, and part of Calderdale in West Yorkshire.

== Curriculum ==
UTC Lancashire specialised in engineering and construction. Pupils aged 14 to 16 followed one of three pathways of study divided by ability. A range of GCSEs were offered, as well as BTECs, NVQs and City and Guilds qualifications depending on the pathway.

Sixth form students also followed one of the three pathways, which could include A Levels, BTECs, NVQs and City and Guilds qualifications depending on the pathway.

All three of the pathways at both levels had a focus on the specialisms of engineering and construction.

== Closure ==
The college closed in July 2017 owing to low pupil numbers; in May 2016, there were 113 attending.
