= Sharon White =

Sharon White may refer to:

- Sharon White (singer) (born 1955), US country music singer and member of The Whites
- Sharon White (businesswoman) (born 1967), British business woman and former civil servant
- Sharon Finnan-White, Australia netball international
