= Selfridge Provincial Stores =

British company

Selfridge Provincial Stores was a holding company of a group of department stores in the United Kingdom. The company was formed by Selfridge & Co. in 1926 and was active until 1940.

== History ==
In 1926, financier Jimmy White convinced Harry Gordon Selfridge to restructure his company. One of the new initiatives taken by Selfridge was the creation of Selfridge Provincial Stores. White had based his ideas on Clarence Hatry's Drapery Trust. It brought together the disparate drapery businesses acquired by Selfridge since 1918 and provided a strong vehicle for new acquisitions. The new company was over subscribed and opened with a working capital of £3.3 million. Stores in the group retained their local, often long-established, identities but were united under the banner of 'SPS'. The marketing techniques which had proved successful at Selfridges' flagship Oxford Street store were employed across the group.

The first purchase made by the company was the Bon Marché group in south London, owners of Pratts of Streatham, Barrett Brothers of Clapham and Quin & Axten, as well as the eponymous Brixton flagship. H. Gordon Selfridge Jr. was made managing director. A year later Cole Brothers of Sheffield was added and by 1929 Selfridges combined trading activities formed the biggest retail group in Europe. The Selfridge Provincial Stores were:

- John Barnes, Finchley Road, London
- Barrett Brothers, Clapham
- Blinkhorn & Son, Gloucester and Stroud
- Bon Marché, Brixton (1926)
- Brice & Sons, Northampton
- Brown Thomas, Dublin (1919; sold 1933)
- W J Buckley & Co., Harrogate
- A H Bull, Reading
- Caleys, Windsor
- Cole Brothers, Sheffield
- A J Dorrell, St Albans
- C J Hardy, Leeds (men's and boys' outfitters)
- Holdrons, Peckham
- Jones Brothers, Holloway
- George Henry Lee, Liverpool
- Needham & Sons, Brighton
- Pratts, Streatham (1926)
- Quin & Axten, Brixton (1926)
- Robert Sayle, Cambridge (1934)
- Thomsons, Peterborough (1919)
- Trewin Brothers, Watford (1918)

By the 1930s the Selfridges empire was collapsing. With the advent of the Second World War Harry Selfridge left Britain for the safety of America and in 1941 his title of president was removed and he was ousted from the board of Selfridges & Co.

The struggling SPS group, reduced to sixteen department stores by this time, was sold to the John Lewis Partnership in 1940.
