= Caleys =

Former department store in England

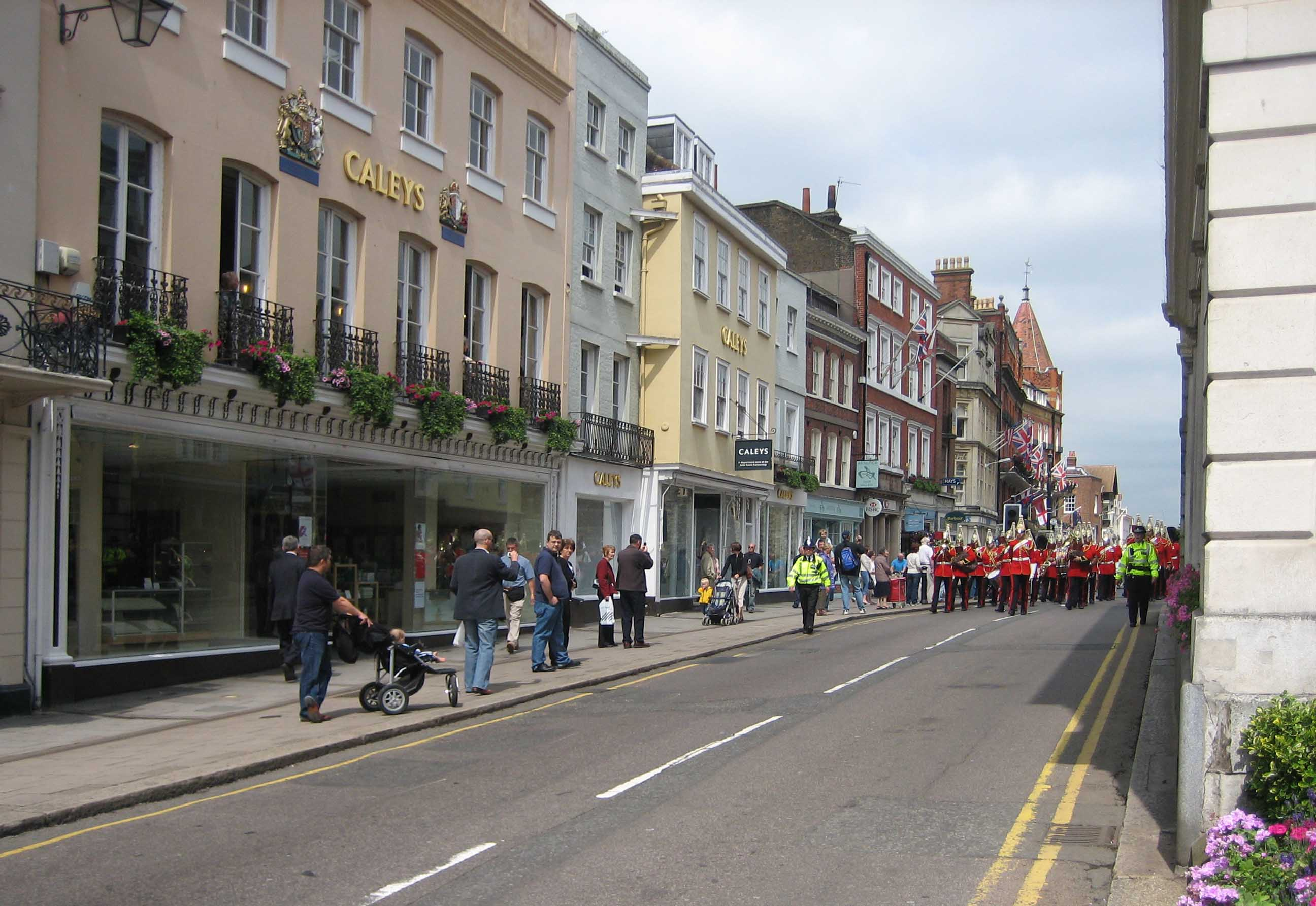
Windsor High Street with Caleys store, shortly before closure in 2006. The corner of the Guildhall can be seen on the right. Photo: Pamela Marson.

Caleys was a department store in Windsor, Berkshire, England.

It opened in the High Street in 1823, when an existing family business transferred from Castle Street, now Castle Hill. For much of the 20th century it was part of department store groups and it acquired royal warrants. However, by the early 21st century it had ceased to be viable and was closed since then.

== History ==
The store was established by John Caley and his wife Mary Ann Caley on 5 April 1823 as advertised in the Windsor Express at the time and remained a family business for over a century, growing into a well regarded department store opposite Windsor Guildhall which is close to Windsor Castle. The business was purchased by Selfridge Provincial Stores in 1919. This group, together with Caleys, was acquired by the John Lewis Partnership in 1940.

=== Decline and closure ===
As a number of the partnership's branches were disposed of, others enlarged and new stores built, Caleys became the smallest of the John Lewis department stores.

On 18 January 2006, John Lewis announced the closure of the store, stating that 'the location, size and layout of the building will always stand in the way of any prospect of a return to profitable trading'. Caleys closed in July 2006.

The site was redeveloped in 2010 with the addition of two extra floors to become a multi use site consisting of the Macdonald Windsor Hotel as the major tenant, with a TK Maxx department store and Esquires coffee shop also present. The original frontages have been largely preserved.

== Royal warrants ==
Caleys held two royal warrants of appointment, at the time of the closure, as 'supplier of household and fancy goods' to Her Majesty The Queen and as 'supplier of household and fancy goods and millinery' to Her Majesty Queen Elizabeth The Queen Mother.

== Sources ==
- Windsor Express and its successors. (Various editions, early 19th century to early 21st century.)
- Windlesora. (Windsor Local History Group, various editions.)
- Windlesora on The Royal Windsor Web Site. Retrieved 16 November 2013.
