= Leitch Review =

The Leitch Review of Skills was an independent review by Alexander Leitch, Baron Leitch, the Chairman of the National Employment Panel, commissioned by the British Government in 2004, 'to identify the UK's optimal skills mix for 2020 to maximise economic growth, productivity and social justice, set out the balance of responsibility for achieving that skills profile and consider the policy framework required to support it.'

The final report, published at the end of 2006 recommended that UK should urgently and dramatically raise achievements at all levels of skills and recommended that it commit to becoming a world leader in skills by 2020, as benchmarked against the upper quartile of the OECD - effectively a doubling of attainment at most skill levels.

== Background ==
The Leitch Review was launched due to concerns over the ability of UK to compete in the increasingly globalised markets due to poor levels of literacy and numeracy in some sections of the workforce, and due to the UK's relatively poor international position in intermediate level skills and productivity. The Government's 2004 pre-budget document Skills in the global economy identified that this was reflected in the relatively low proportion of young people remaining in education after the age of 16, together with limited skills progression and training to higher levels once in work. As a result of such concerns it was announced in the 2004 Pre-Budget Report that Lord Leitch had been jointly commissioned by the Chancellor of the Exchequer and the Education Secretary to prepare a report.

== Findings and recommendations ==
After an interim report, Skills in the UK: the long term challenge, published in December 2005, the final Leitch Report was published in December 2006 as Prosperity for all in the global economy – world class skills. It recommends that the UK should aim to be a world leader on skills by 2020, and suggested how that aim should be achieved.

The Report found that the UK currently ranked 12th out of 18 comparative members of the OECD (Organisation for Economic Co-operation and Development). The Report states that by 2020:

- 95% of adults should have achieved the basic skills of functional literacy and numeracy, an increase on 85% literacy and 79% numeracy in 2005;
- more than 90% of adults should be qualified to at least Level 2 (equivalent to five good GCSEs or their vocational equivalents), an increase from 69% in 2005, with a commitment to achieve 95% as soon as possible;
- the balance of intermediate skills should have shifted from Level 2 to Level 3 (equivalent to two or more A Levels), which means achieving 1.9 million additional Level 3 attainments and 500,000 apprenticeships;
- more than 40% of adults should be qualified to Level 4 and above (equivalent to degree-level qualifications), up from 29% in 2005.

The Leitch Report emphasises the necessity of shared responsibility: employers and individuals, as well as the government, should increase their investment in training and education. Employers and individuals should contribute most to training which gives them ‘private’ benefits, while government investment should focus on promoting basic skills for everyone.

A significant change recommended by Leitch is that the provision of vocational education and training should be demand-led, adaptable and responsive. Employers should therefore be directly involved in deciding what training priorities should be. Targeted individuals will also be empowered to purchase the type of training they need through the introduction of Skills Accounts.

== Implementation ==
As a result of the Leitch Report the Government merged several organisations to form the UK Commission for Employment and Skills following Leitch's recommendation to ‘depoliticise’ the skills agenda by securing a broad political and stakeholder consensus for the UK’s world-class ambitions for 2020 and beyond.

Following the report, there has already been a significant change in the government's approach to training for young people and adults. The 14–19 age group has seen an increase in the number of publicly funding training opportunities. The government is also introducing an entitlement for 14- to 19-year-olds to access training across a range of education providers to widen the choice of subjects available.

Diplomas, the International Baccalaureate and Apprenticeships are all part of this agenda. Other policies include raising the statutory age at which young people leave full-time education to 18 and encouraging collaboration between neighbouring education institutions.

The greatest changes will be in adult education and will involve a much greater competitive element to provision, funding and custom.

== Criticism ==
Because most public funding will be directed towards level 2 skills, adults wanting to augment their skills at levels 3 or 4 will have to pay more than at present. This has provoked debate about whether the ramifications of the Leitch Report will stifle the benefits of learning for learning's sake.

Some 5 months after publication of the review, the CBI, employers and Skills Envoy Sir Digby Jones criticised the Government over their delay in implementing the 'Skills Pledge', which Leitch recommended all employers should sign, committing them to training all their workers to Level 2 by 2010.

== See also ==
- Education in the United Kingdom
- National Qualifications Framework
