= Investors in People =

British standards organisation

Agency overview
- Formed: 1991
- Jurisdiction: United Kingdom
- Headquarters: 3 Lloyds Avenue London, EC3
- Agency executive: Paul Devoy, CEO
- Website: www.investorsinpeople.com

Investors in People is a standard for people management, offering accreditation to organisations that adhere to the Investors in People Standard. From 1991 to January 2017, Investors in People was owned by the UK government. As of 1 February 2017, Investors in People transitioned into the Investors in People Community Interest Company. Investors in People assessments are conducted locally through local Delivery Centres across the UK and internationally.

== History ==
In 1990 the Department of Employment was tasked with developing a national standard of good practice for training and development. Investors in People was born and officially launched at that year's CBI Conference in Glasgow by then Secretary of State for Employment, the Rt Hon Michael Howard QC MP.

Investors in People UK was formed in 1991 to protect the integrity of the Investors in People framework. It was a non-departmental public body and received funding from the former UK Department for Business, Innovation and Skills (BIS). The organisation was based in London, United Kingdom and managed the development, policy, promotion and quality assurance of the Investors in People framework.

From April 2010 the work of the organisation was transferred to UKCES (UK Commission for Employment and Skills) which was responsible for the strategic ownership of Investors in People until January 2017, when the organisation transitioned into a Community Interest Company on 1 February 2017.

== The Sixth Generation Standard ==
In September 2015, Investors in People launched the sixth generation standard, evolved from the previous fifth generation to keep pace with modern practices. The current framework reflects the latest workplace trends, leading practices and employee conditions required to create outperforming teams. The latest framework focuses on three key areas: leading, supporting and improving. Within these sit nine performance indicators based on the features of organisations that consistently outperform industry norms. Organisations are assessed against these indicators using a performance model made up of four levels: Developed, Established, Advanced, High-Performing. In order to achieve the minimum level of accreditation against this framework, an organisation must meet all nine indicators at 'Developed' level.

== Accreditation ==
Thousands of organisations from the public and private sector have achieved accreditation. In 1999 it was estimated that one in three UK organisations was accredited, with one quarter of the UK workforce working for an Investors in People accredited company in 2002. In 2011, 2,873 UK schools held the Standard.

As of 2013, there are four levels of accreditation: Accredited, Silver, Gold and Platinum.

== Research ==
The original research was carried out in 2000 by Duncan Collins (architect of the Standard in 1991) and David Gittings. This was published by The Department of Education and Employment as ISBN 1-84185-347-X and was the first empirical proof that developing pays off financially. The Standard is regularly reviewed by Investors in People (formally as part of the UK Commission for Employment and Skills) and independent research is conducted on the benefits of working with the Investors in People framework and the impact of achieving recognition. This research has indicated that Investors in People has a positive impact on performance.

Investors in People also commissions regular research into employee views and attitudes. This includes their employment satisfaction survey, the annual Job Exodus Trends Report. The research looks at workers feelings towards changing job in the next 12 months and those actively looking for a new position.

In 2009 Investors in People funded research together with the Health and Safety Executive and the Chartered Institute of Personnel and Development concluding that companies that treated their staff well had a better chance of surviving economic downturn.

In 2002 Investors in People researched graduate employment trends, concluding that two thirds of graduates believe training and development is one of the most important factors when choosing an employer.

== Investors in People International ==
Though UK-based, the Standard has been licensed to a number of other countries through Investors in People International. Investors in People International operates in more than 80 countries and delivers services in more than 30 languages.
