= Ed Richards (chief executive) =

British businessman (born 1965)

Chief Executive of Ofcom
- In office October 2006 – December 2014
- Succeeded by: Sharon White

Personal details
- Born: Edward Charles Richards; 29 August 1965 (age 61)
- Education: London School of Economics

Edward Charles Richards (born 29 August 1965) is a Founding Partner at Flint Global, and previously was the Chief Executive of Ofcom, the independent regulator for the communications industry in the United Kingdom. He stepped down in December 2014.

Richards attended the Portsmouth Grammar School, where he overlapped with Mel Stride, who is now a Conservative MP for Central Devon. He graduated from the London School of Economics with an Economics degree.

Richards was previously a Senior Policy Advisor to Prime Minister Tony Blair and before that Controller of Corporate Strategy at the BBC. He has also worked in consulting at London Economics Ltd, and as an advisor to Gordon Brown.

Richards is married to Delyth Evans, who is a former member of the Welsh Assembly.
