= Bernard Miller =

British businessman

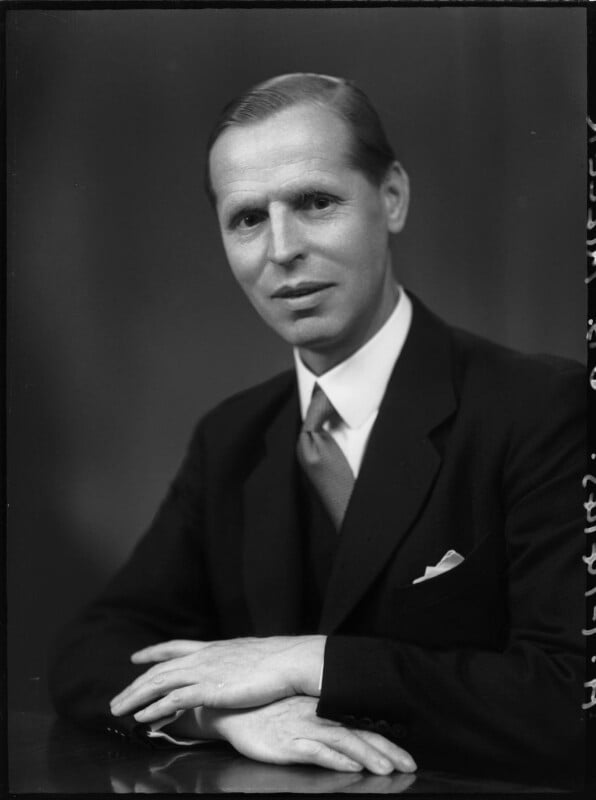
Miller in 1951

Sir Oswald Bernard Miller (25 March 1904 – 23 February 2003) was a British businessman, who was chairman of the John Lewis Partnership from 1955 to 1972.

== Life ==
Miller was educated at Sloane School and Jesus College, Oxford, obtaining his BA degree in 1927. He obtained a First in History and won the Stanhope Prize for his essay, later published as a biography, on Robert Harley, Earl of Oxford. The college made him an Honorary Fellow in 1968.

He joined the John Lewis Partnership in 1927, and was appointed a director in 1935. He served as chairman between 1955 and 1972, and was knighted in 1967. He was also a member of the Council of Industrial Design (1957 to 1966) and the Monopolies Commission (1961 to 1969). He was also associated with Southampton University, as Treasurer (1974 to 1982), Chairman of the Council (1982 to 1987) and Pro-Chancellor (1983 to 1990). He was awarded an honorary doctorate of laws by the University in 1981. He died on 23 February 2003.
