= Source (lifestyle magazine) =

British bi-monthly lifestyle magazine

- Editor: Andrea Lynch (Art Director); Michelle Dickson (Deputy Editor); Lisa Walmsley (Chief Sub Editor); Morwenna Lawson (Sub Editor); Helen Bull (Art Editor); Ginny Henry (Picture Editor)
- Categories: Lifestyle, Design, Food, Beauty, Fashion, Health, Finance, Travel
- Frequency: Bi-Monthly
- Founded: 2006
- Final issue: 2009
- Company: John Brown Group
- Country: United Kingdom
- Language: English
- Website: Greenbee - Source

Source magazine was a free bi-monthly magazine published by the John Brown Group on behalf of Greenbee, a former direct services brand of the John Lewis Partnership. The magazine featured articles covering interior design, beauty, the arts, travel, finance, and lifestyle. Helena Lang edited the magazine between 2006 and 2009. Source ceased publication in 2009, and the Greenbee brand was discontinued in 2010.

== Conception ==
Source magazine was launched in Autumn 2006, around the time the John Lewis Partnership launched Greenbee, its new direct services company, providing selected services, from insurance to ticket sales and internet service. Source was thus conceived, as well as being a source of entertainment and information, to introduce customers to the Greenbee services (helping to make it a household name), and to reinforce the relationship between the John Lewis Partnership and its customers. It comes from the same stable as Waitrose Food Illustrated, a magazine published for 10 years.

== Target audience ==
Source was intended to appeal to typical John Lewis and Waitrose customers, that is, predominantly upper middle class and middle class (A, B, and to some extent C1) older people. As such, returning advertisers include Prada, Lancôme, Samsung, AEG, and Panasonic. In order to appeal to younger customers, Source underwent slight changes to give it a more modern look, including changing the font on the spine from serif to sans-serif, and writing the issue numbers in numeric format rather than text.

== Availability and distribution ==
Source was only available from John Lewis and Waitrose branches in the UK, although the previous five issues are shown on the magazine's website.

== Pricing ==
Source magazine was available at no charge. The first five issues had a coloured circle on the cover reading "Free to John Lewis and Waitrose customers". Since then, the cover read "free" and a margin note near the staff list read "Free to all Greenbee, John Lewis, and Waitrose customers". The move came after the original format misled some customers into mistakenly thinking they needed to have a Partnership card or that a purchase was needed for the magazine to be free.

== Cover stars ==
Each issue had a celebrity on the cover, with whom an in-depth interview is conducted in the magazine. Below is a list of cover stars to date:

Issue	Cover Star
#1 (Autumn 2006)	Madonna
#2 (Nov/Dec 2006)	Emma Thompson
#3 (Jan/Feb 2007)	Cate Blanchett
#4 (Mar/Apr 2007)	George Clooney
#5 (May/June 2007)	Hermione Norris
#6 (Jul/Aug 2007)	Sting
#7 (Sept/Oct 2007)	Angelina Jolie
#8 (Nov/Dec 2007)	Rachel Weisz
#9 (Jan/Feb 2008)	Dawn French & Jennifer Saunders
#10 (Mar/Apr 2008)	Kristin Scott Thomas
#11 (May/June 2008)	Kim Cattrall
#12 (July/Aug 2008)	Julianne Moore
#13 (Sep/Oct 2008)	Debra Messing
