= Flint Global =

British public affairs and business advisory firm

- Industry: Management consulting
- Founded: 2015; 11 years ago
- Founders: Sir Simon Fraser; Ed Richards
- Headquarters: The Met Building; 22 Percy Street, London, England
- Area served: Worldwide
- Key people: Ed Richards (Interim CEO)
- Services: Policy and political analysis, regulatory strategy, geopolitical advisory, competition and economic modelling, investor due diligence
- Parent: Cinven (majority owner)
- Website: flint-global.com

Flint Global is a British business advisory and management consulting firm. Founded in 2015 by diplomat Sir Simon Fraser and corporate executive Ed Richards, it is majority owned by private equity firm Cinven.

Flint Global advises businesses and investors on political, regulatory, competition and economic issues, and is staffed primarily by former public officials. The firm is predominantly based in London, with additional offices in Paris, Brussels, Amsterdam, Berlin, Melbourne, Hong Kong, and Singapore, and operates internationally.

== History ==
Flint Global was founded in 2015 by Sir Simon Fraser, former Permanent Under-Secretary of State at the Foreign and Commonwealth Office, and Ed Richards, a former chief executive of Ofcom and Senior Policy Advisor to Prime Minister Tony Blair.

James Purnell, a former Labour cabinet minister and director of strategy at the BBC, was appointed as Flint's chief executive in 2024. He remained CEO until he was appointed Downing Street Chief of Staff by Prime Minister Andy Burnham in June 2026.

In December 2025, the private equity firm Cinven agreed to acquire a majority stake in Flint Global. The Financial Times reported that the transaction valued the business at approximately £190 million, including debt.

== Activities ==
Flint Global advises businesses and investors on policy, politics, regulation, and competition. Its work includes assessing the effects of political and regulatory developments on commercial decisions, particularly in industries subject to significant government oversight.

According to founder Sir Simon Fraser, Flint Global's business model draws on the experience of former senior civil servants, politicians and government advisers to provide clients with insights into policymaking and regulation.

Current advisers include former DCMS permanent secretary Dame Sue Owen, European commissioner Sir Julian King, Labour MP Siôn Simon, author James Crabtree, Portuguese author and former politician Bruno Maçães, strategic advisers Baroness Lloyd and Sam White, Malaysian politician Shahril Sufian Hamdan, Australian diplomat Heidi Venamore, and political commentator Tim Montgomerie. Past advisers include former special adviser Nikki da Costa, Conservative MP Alistair Burt, and lawyer Stephen Kinsella.

=== Aviation regulation ===
In December 2019, Sky News reported that the Civil Aviation Authority had appointed Flint Global to examine the scope for third-party involvement in the design, construction and operation of terminals at Heathrow Airport. The work formed part of an assessment of possible competition in airport terminal operations.

=== National Lottery licensing ===
In August 2020, Sky News reported that the Czech lottery operator Sazka Group had appointed Flint Global as an adviser on its potential bid to operate the UK National Lottery. The report noted that Flint employed Dame Sue Owen, a former permanent secretary at the Department for Digital, Culture, Media and Sport. Flint representatives said that Owen was not involved in the Sazka assignment and had had no contact with the company.

=== Proposed newspaper acquisition ===
In November 2023, Sky News reported that Flint Global was advising RedBird IMI on its proposed acquisition of newspapers The Daily Telegraph and The Spectator. The proposed transaction attracted regulatory scrutiny over foreign investment in British media ownership.

=== Clients and government relations ===
Reporting on Purnell's departure in June 2026 examined Flint Global's client relationships and its work in regulated industries. The Guardian reported that the firm's clients included BP, Amazon, Apple, Uber and Jaguar Land Rover. It also reported that the firm's European Union transparency-register disclosures listed Google, Microsoft and Glencore, among other clients. The Financial Times and The Guardian reported that Flint had advised Thames Water and some of the utility's bondholders.

The Guardian reported that the firm did not publish a comprehensive list of its UK clients, while available UK lobbying records showed a limited number of entries involving contact with government ministers or officials on behalf of companies. Green Party leader Zack Polanski criticised Purnell's appointment by Burnham and called upon Flint to publish a list of its corporate clients. Flint said that Purnell had recused himself from client activity during the transition and would have no ongoing financial interest in the firm. A spokesperson for Burnham's team said that any future conflicts of interest would be appropriately managed.
