= John Barnes (department store) =

Former department store in London

Coordinates: 51°32′47″N 0°10′47″W

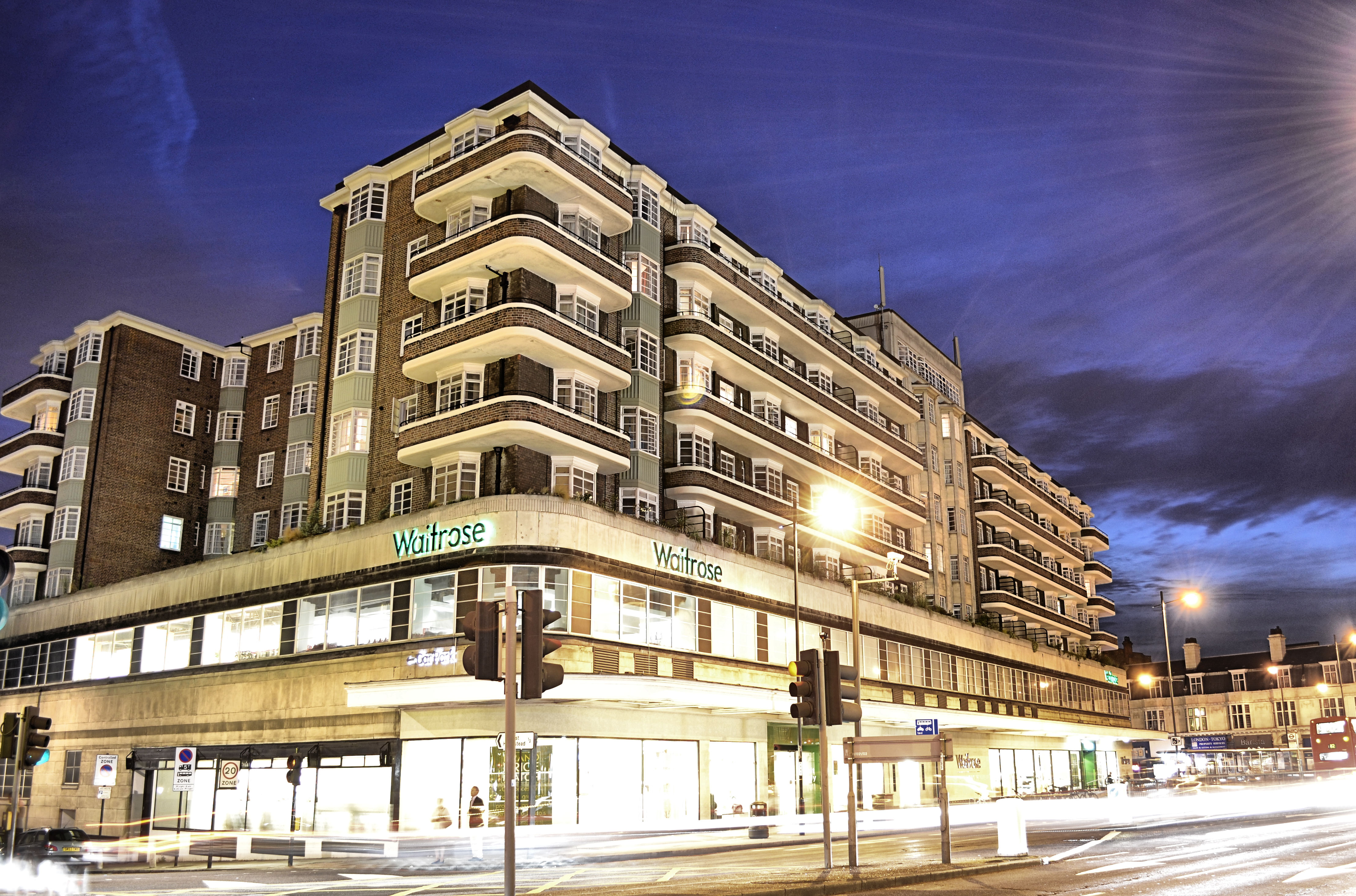
The old John Barnes department store, Finchley Road, London NW3, now Waitrose

John Barnes was a department store located on the Finchley Road in north west London. The building is now occupied by a Waitrose & Partners store and flats.

== History ==
John Barnes was one of six founders who came up with the idea to open a department store in 1898. The founders were all prominent London retailers, with John Barnes being a director of Barkers of Kensington. However, before the store could open, John Barnes (who had been the chairman of the founders board) had died in a shipping accident off the coast of Guernsey in 1899.

In 1900 the remaining founders opened their store on Finchley Road in the name of their former chairman. It was located on the site of 14 shops and several houses and included a central passenger lift. The store occupied four of the floors, and there was accommodation for over 400 members of staff. In its first year, it had a turnover of £125,000 (£10 million in today's money) but it was not until 1905 that the store started making profits.

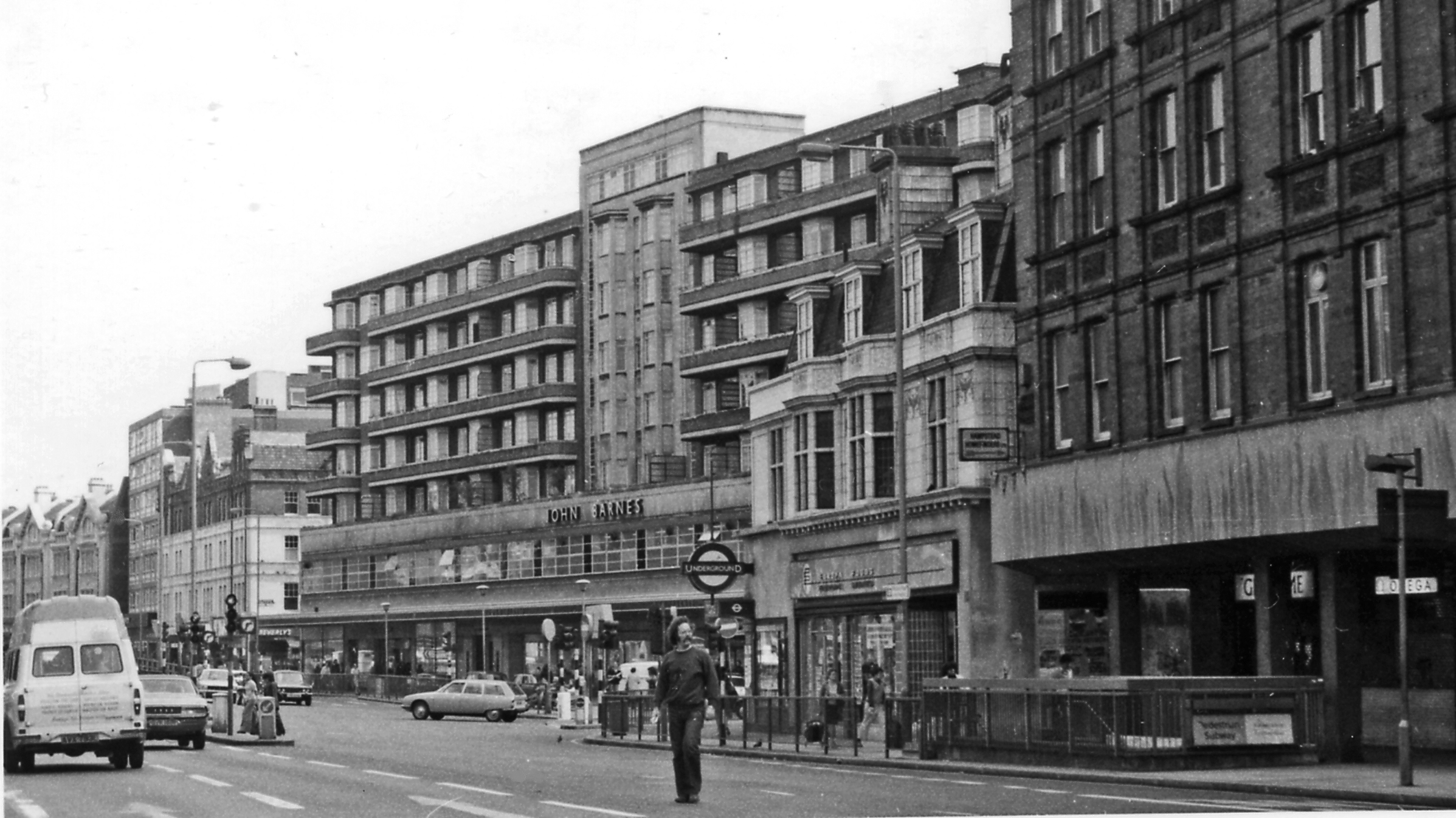
View in 1978

In 1926, the business was purchased by the newly formed Selfridge Provincial Stores group. With the purchase major changes were brought in to modernise the business, including no staff living on the premises. The business was so successful that in 1935 the store was completely rebuilt in the fashionable ocean-liner style of the time by a design from architect T. P. Bennett. The new store was located on three of the eight floors, with 96 flats on the upper five floors in a development known as St John's Court.

The collapse of the Selfridge Provincial Store group in 1940 saw John Barnes become part of the John Lewis Partnership. The business flourished after the Second World War as it was one of the few businesses not affected by the German bombing. However, the store became more reliant on the Food Hall to stay profitable, and the opening of the Brent Cross shopping centre in 1976 (which included a John Lewis store) damaged the business further. On 17 January 1981, the store closed for good with 253 John Lewis partners losing their jobs, with many being transferred to the Brent Cross Branch. However, on 2 February 1981 the store reopened as Waitrose John Barnes on the ground floor (the food hall had been previously in the basement) and continues to operate from the location. The basement is now a car park for the store offering parking for customers.

The store closed for a major refurbishment on 7th July 2024, and re-opened on 21st August 2024. To celebrate, “Golden tickets” worth £50 were given to the first 50 customers. It was one of the first stores to be refurbished, as part of a 3-4 year plan to renovate existing stores. The store now features chilled wine cabinets. A click and collect station to make shopping between Waitrose and John Lewis easier, was also re-vamped.
