= Simon Fraser (diplomat) =

British diplomat

Sir Simon Fraser GCMG
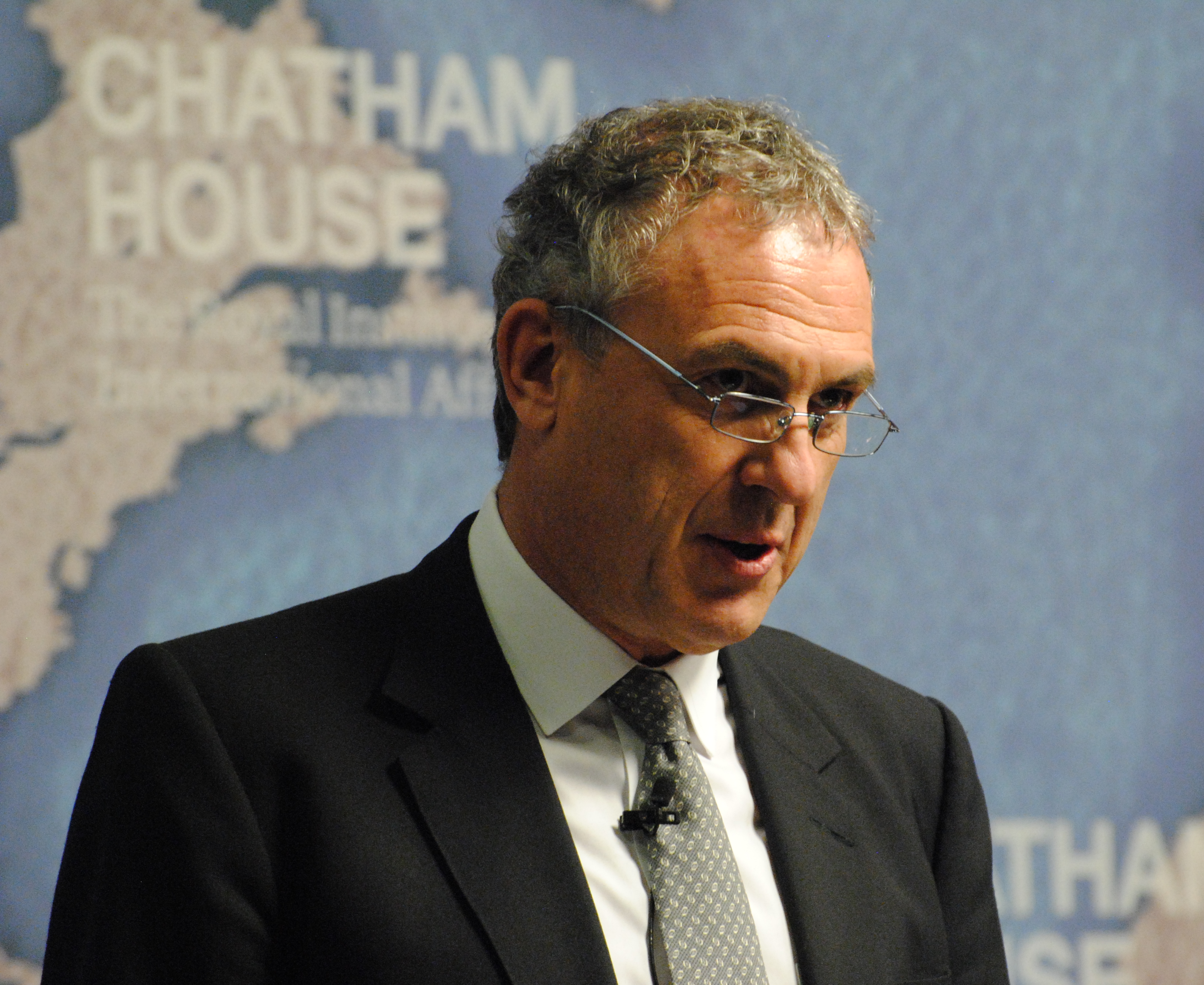
- Fraser speaking at Chatham House, September 2015

Permanent Under-Secretary for Foreign and Commonwealth Affairs Head of HM Diplomatic Service
- In office August 2010 – July 2015
- Sec. of State: William Hague; Philip Hammond
- Preceded by: Sir Peter Ricketts
- Succeeded by: Sir Simon McDonald

Permanent Secretary of Department for Business, Innovation and Skills
- In office May 2009 – August 2010
- Preceded by: Himself as Permanent Secretary of the Department for Business, Enterprise and Regulatory Reform
- Succeeded by: Martin Donnelly

Permanent Secretary of the Department for Business, Enterprise and Regulatory Reform
- In office 2009–2009
- Preceded by: Brian Bender
- Succeeded by: Himself as Permanent Secretary of the Department for Business, Innovation and Skills

Director-General, Europe of the Foreign and Commonwealth Office
- In office 2008–2009
- Preceded by: Martin Donnelly
- Succeeded by: Nick Baird as Director-General, Europe and Globalisation

Chef de Cabinet for Commissioner Mandelson European Commission
- In office 2004–2008
- Preceded by: Position Established
- Succeeded by: Julian King

Sir Simon James Fraser GCMG (born 3 June 1958) is a British former diplomat who served as the Permanent Under-Secretary of the Foreign and Commonwealth Office from August 2010 to July 2015, having served as Permanent Secretary of the Department for Business, Innovation and Skills from May 2009 to August 2010. Sir Simon is a Trustee of the Patchwork Foundation, founded by Harris Bokhari. Sir Simon is currently Chair of Chatham House, having previously served as Deputy Chair from 2016 to 2022. He is also a Founding Partner of Flint Global.

== Early life ==
Fraser was educated at St Paul's School, London, and Corpus Christi College, Cambridge, where he gained an MA in Classics.

== Diplomatic career ==
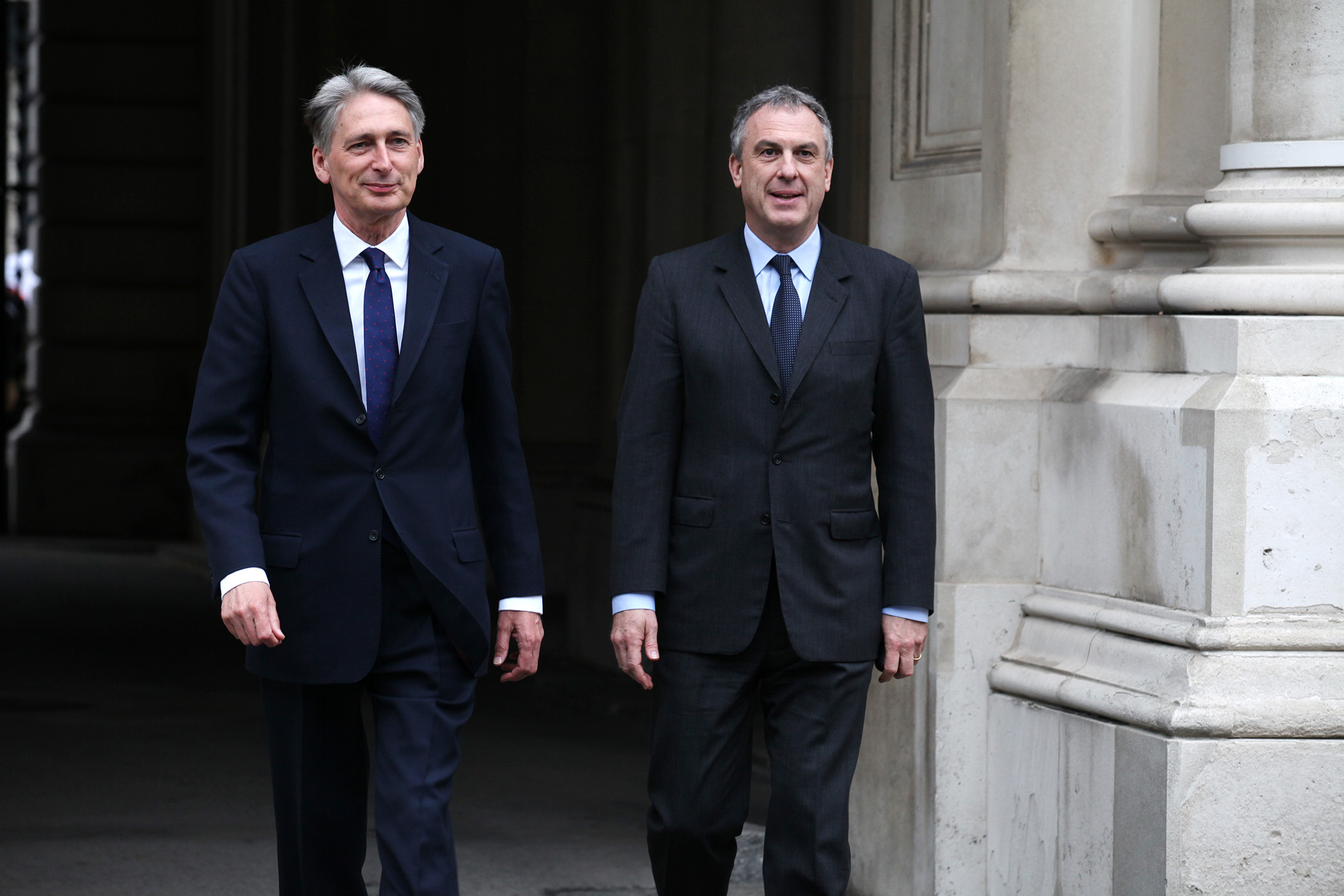
Fraser welcomes Philip Hammond, Secretary of State for Foreign and Commonwealth Affairs, at the Foreign & Commonwealth Office in London on 8 May 2015.

Before going to the Business Department, Fraser's career had centred on the Foreign and Commonwealth Office. He joined the Office in 1979, from where he was sent to the United Nations to help the lead UK delegation to the 5th Committee of the General Assembly. Following this, he served in Iraq, Syria, Paris and Brussels. Having been seconded to the European Commission he worked as Chef du Cabinet for Trade Commissioner Peter Mandelson in September 2004; he returned to the FCO in February 2008, where he took up the role of Director-General, Europe and Globalisation.

In July 2010, the Prime Minister announced that Fraser would become Permanent Under Secretary at the Foreign and Commonwealth Office, to replace Sir Peter Ricketts. In July 2015 it was announced Sir Simon was leaving the public sector, to be replaced as Permanent Secretary by Sir Simon McDonald, previously serving as British ambassador to Berlin.

The annual remuneration for his role at the Department for Business, Innovation and Skills was between £160,000 and £165,000 in June 2010. In March 2013 his annual salary at the Foreign Office was between £180,000 and £185,000.

He is a member of the Apprenticeship Ambassadors Network.

== Honours ==
Fraser was appointed Companion of the Order of St Michael and St George (CMG) in the 2009 Birthday Honours, Knight Commander of the Order of St Michael and St George (KCMG) in the 2013 Birthday Honours, and Knight Grand Cross of the Order of St Michael and St George (GCMG) in the 2016 New Year Honours.
