= George Henry Lee =

Former department store in Liverpool

Coordinates: 53°24′22″N 2°58′57″W

George Henry Lee was a department store which opened in the 1850s in Liverpool, England. The business was sold to Selfridges in 1919 and then to John Lewis in 1940.

== Early history ==
In 1853 George Henry Lee and his brother, Henry Boswell Lee Junior opened a bonnet warehouse on Basnett Street, Liverpool. The brothers had learned their trade under their father, Henry Boswell Lee, who was the owner of a famous Liverpool silk business at several sites in the city. George and his brother grew the business quickly into a department store, becoming an exclusive shop with customers being led to the departments they wanted to visit by shop walkers. However, the brothers' business acumen was poor, so they employed an experienced buyer in Thomas Oakshott to manage their growing business from 1861. Oakshott eventually took over as the business partner from Henry Boswell, and solely ran the business from 1874 after George's retirement.

In 1897 the business became incorporated. At the time of Thomas Oakshott's death in 1910, the Oakshott family were the sole owners. The business continued to run under the ownership of the Oakshott family for another nine years before they sold the store to American businessman Harry Gordon Selfridge. Under Selfridge's management the store lost its exclusivity and took on the brashness associated with Selfridge's London store. In 1926 the store was incorporated into the new Selfridge Provincial Stores group, where it stayed until the group was bought by John Lewis in 1940.

== Under John Lewis ==
During the war years the store was affected less than other businesses in port towns due to Liverpool's location. The only major issue was the closure of the G H Lees' Cotton Exchange which had to be closed due to lack of materials, much to the disappointment of its customers.

After the war, the business grew, first opening a new store in Chester in 1951 which specialised in the selling of furnishing fabrics and piece goods. The business further grew in 1961, when John Lewis purchased the department store next door, Bon Marche, from its owners the Liverpool Co-operative Society and merged it into George Henry Lee. Bon Marche had previously been formed in the late 19th century by David Lewis, of Lewis's, but had been sold as a failing business to the Co-op in the 1950s.

The business entered a decline, firstly with the Chester store closing in 1967 due to structural problems, and the change in shipping practices that saw the loss of jobs in the port of Liverpool. In the 1980s the business picked up with the new investment in the city and was known as a landmark of Liverpool. This all changed in 2002, when the partners decided, as part of the store refurbishment, the business would be re-branded under the John Lewis name. So on 27 May 2002 George Henry Lee was no more, as the store was re-opened as John Lewis Liverpool.

In 2008 John Lewis moved from the former G H Lee and Bon Marché stores into a new building on South John Street in the Liverpool One development. The original Basnett Street building has been redeveloped with smaller retail outlets on the ground floor; in 2014 there were plans to convert the upper storeys into a 150-room hotel.
