= Stuart Hampson =

English businessman born 1947

Sir Stuart Hampson
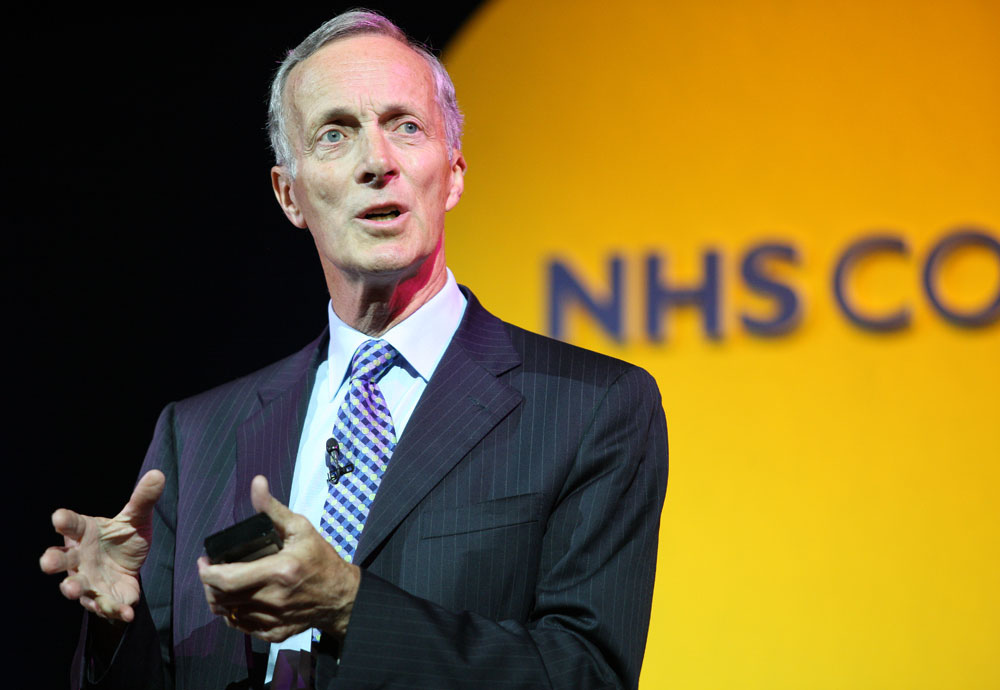

Chairman of John Lewis Partnership
- In office 1993–2007
- Preceded by: Peter Lewis
- Succeeded by: Sir Charlie Mayfield

Personal details
- Born: 7 January 1947 (age 79) Oldham, Lancashire, England
- Citizenship: United Kingdom
- Education: University of Oxford

Sir Stuart Hampson CVO DL (born 7 January 1947) is a British businessman. He was formerly chairman of the John Lewis Partnership. He was the fourth person to be appointed and held the position from 1993 to 2007.

== Biography ==
Hampson joined the Partnership in 1982 and, after gaining experience in a number of department stores, became Managing Director of Tyrrell & Green (now John Lewis Southampton). He was appointed to the Board as Director of Research and Expansion in 1986, adding The Deputy Chairmanship to his responsibilities in 1989 and he became the fourth Chairman of the Partnership in 1993.

During those 14 years, Hampson presided over a programme of modernisation without sacrificing the partnership ethos and principles that were embodied in its 1929 constitution of co-ownership and the happiness of its staff. His 14 years as chairman saw steady expansion, the refurbishment of the Oxford Street and Sloane Square department stores, the extension of trading hours, the expansion of the product range and the establishment of an online presence through John Lewis Direct and Ocado, the home-delivery grocery service.

Hampson was knighted in 1998 and also received an honorary doctorate in Business Administration from Kingston University in the same year. He became a Deputy Lieutenant of Buckinghamshire in 2015. He was appointed Commander of the Royal Victorian Order (CVO) in the 2016 Birthday Honours.

Hampson spent the first part of his career in the Civil Service, starting at the Board of Trade in 1969 after leaving Oxford University. His last post was as an Assistant Secretary at the Department of Trade and Industry.

A founding Deputy Chairman of London First and past President of the Royal Agricultural Society of England. He was President of the Employee Ownership Association. Hampson chaired the team tackling Economic Renewal in deprived communities, and he is one of the Prince of Wales's Ambassadors in this area. He is also an active Freemason. He was appointed Senior Grand Warden of the United Grand Lodge of England for 2016-17.

== Retirement ==
On 16 December 2006 it was announced that Hampson would retire from the John Lewis Partnership in March 2007. He was replaced by Charlie Mayfield, previously Managing Director of John Lewis department stores.

Following his retirement, Hampson joined the corporate speaking circuit in 2009 to lecture on the John Lewis ethos and pass on his vision of employee engagement and employee ownership.

== Notes ==
Business positions
Preceded by Peter Lewis	Chairman of John Lewis Partnership; 1993–2007	Succeeded by Sir Charlie Mayfield
