= Charlie Mayfield =

British business executive (born 1966)

Sir Charlie Mayfield

Chairman of the John Lewis Partnership
- In office 2007–2020
- Succeeded by: Dame Sharon White

Chairman of the UK Commission for Employment and Skills
- In office November 2010 – March 2017
- Preceded by: Michael Rake
- Succeeded by: office abolished

Personal details
- Born: Andrew Charles Mayfield; 25 December 1966 (age 59)
- Education: Radley College
- Alma mater: Royal Military Academy Sandhurst; Cranfield School of Management
- Military career
- Allegiance: United Kingdom
- Branch: British Army
- Service years: 1986–1991
- Rank: Lieutenant
- Unit: Scots Guards
- Conflicts: The Troubles

Sir Andrew Charles Mayfield (born 25 December 1966) is a British businessman. He was Chairman of the John Lewis Partnership from 2007 to 2020, and was also Chairman of the UK Commission for Employment and Skills until its closure in March 2017. He previously served in the British Army as an officer.

== Early life ==
Mayfield was born on 25 December 1966, to Lieutenant-Colonel Richard Mayfield. He was educated at Radley College, a private boys school in Oxfordshire. He followed in his father's footsteps and joined the military after leaving school rather than attending university.

== Career ==
=== Military career ===
Mayfield graduated from the Royal Military Academy Sandhurst in 1986, winning the Sword of Honour as the best cadet on his course. On 12 April 1986, he was commissioned into Scots Guards, British Army, as an Ensign (Second Lieutenant). He was given the Personal Number service number 523391. On 12 April 1988, he was promoted to lieutenant. During his career he served in Northern Ireland amid The Troubles. He was 19 when he was first posted there.

He retired from the British Army on 30 September 1991.

=== Business career ===
In 1992, Mayfield graduated from the Cranfield School of Management with a Master of Business Administration (MBA) degree.

He joined SmithKline Beecham as assistant product manager of Instant Horlicks. He was later promoted to Marketing Manager for the Lucozade sports drink brand.

In 1996, he joined McKinsey & Company as a management consultant. During his time there, he worked with consumer and retail organisations.

In 2000, he joined the John Lewis Partnership as head of business development. He was appointed to the Board one year later as Development Director. He was appointed managing director of John Lewis in 2005. In 2007, he was appointed Deputy Chairman of the John Lewis Partnership. In March 2007, he became the fifth Chairman of the John Lewis Partnership.

in November 2010, Mayfield was appointed to the UK Commission for Employment and Skills, a non-departmental public body, as Chairman. This post dissolved in March 2017 with the closure of the Commission.

On 7 November 2018, Mayfield announced that he would be stepping down as Chairman of the John Lewis Partnership. He was succeeded by Sharon White at a meeting of the John Lewis Partnership Council on 4 February 2020.

== Honours ==
Mayfield received the General Service Medal with "Northern Ireland" clasp for his service during The Troubles on Operation Banner.

In the 2013 Birthday Honours, it was announced that Mayfield had been appointed a Knight Bachelor (Kt) for services to business. On 7 February 2014, he was knighted by Charles, Prince of Wales (on behalf of Queen Elizabeth II) during a ceremony at Buckingham Palace.

On 17 July 2013, Mayfield was awarded the honorary degree of Doctor of the University (D.Univ) by Loughborough University. He was presented the honorary degree of Doctor of Science (D.Sc) by the University of Reading on 10 July 2014.

Ribbon	Description	Notes
	Knight Bachelor (Kt)	2013
	General Service Medal	With Clasp "NORTHERN IRELAND"

Business positions
Preceded by	Managing Director of John Lewis; 2005–2007	Succeeded by Andy Street
Preceded by Sir Stuart Hampson	Chairman of the John Lewis Partnership; 2007–2020	Succeeded by Dame Sharon White
