= Bon Marché (Brixton) =

Historic department store in Brixton, London

Coordinates: 51.46368°N 0.11498°W

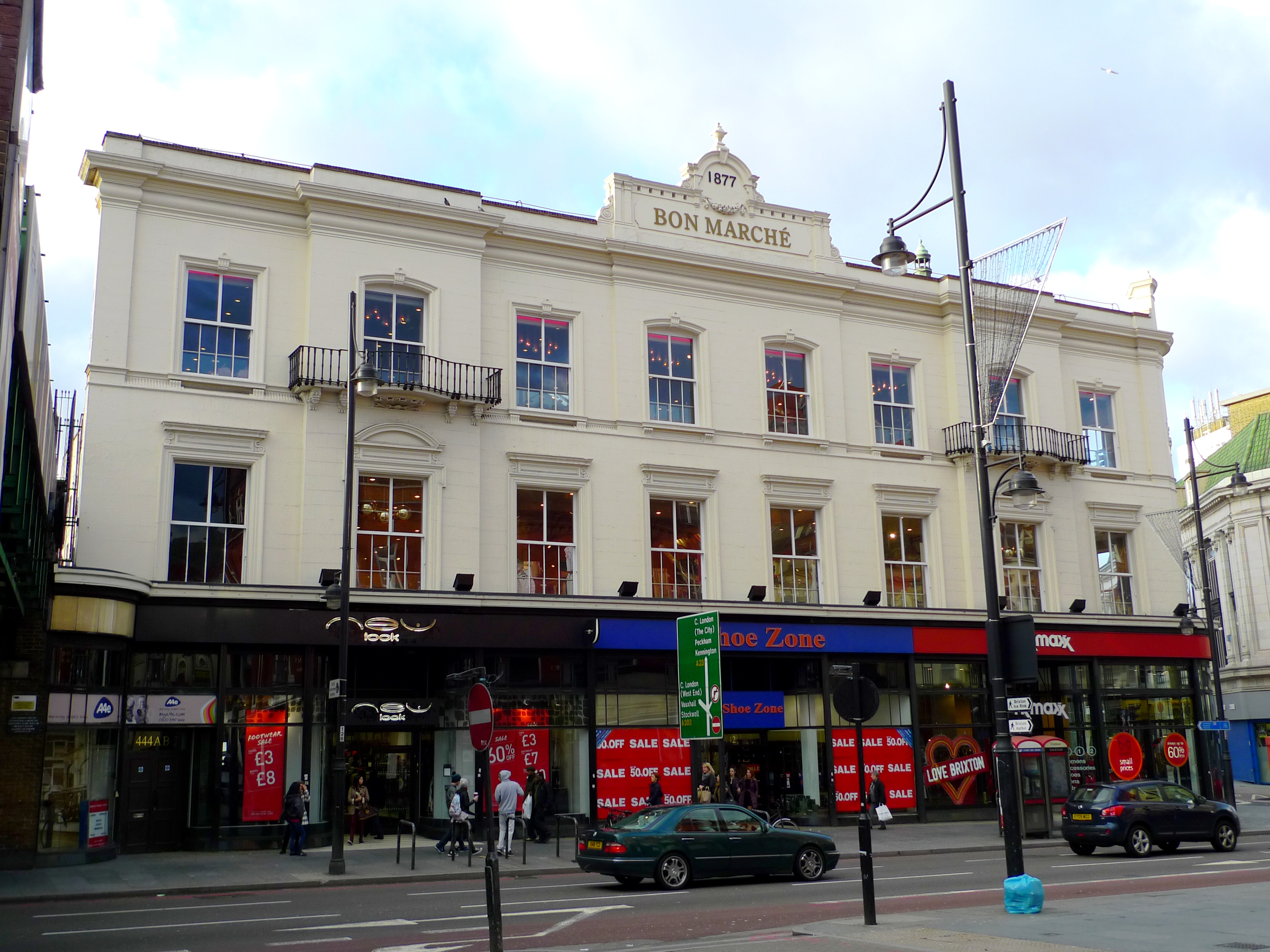
The former Bon Marché building facing Brixton Road

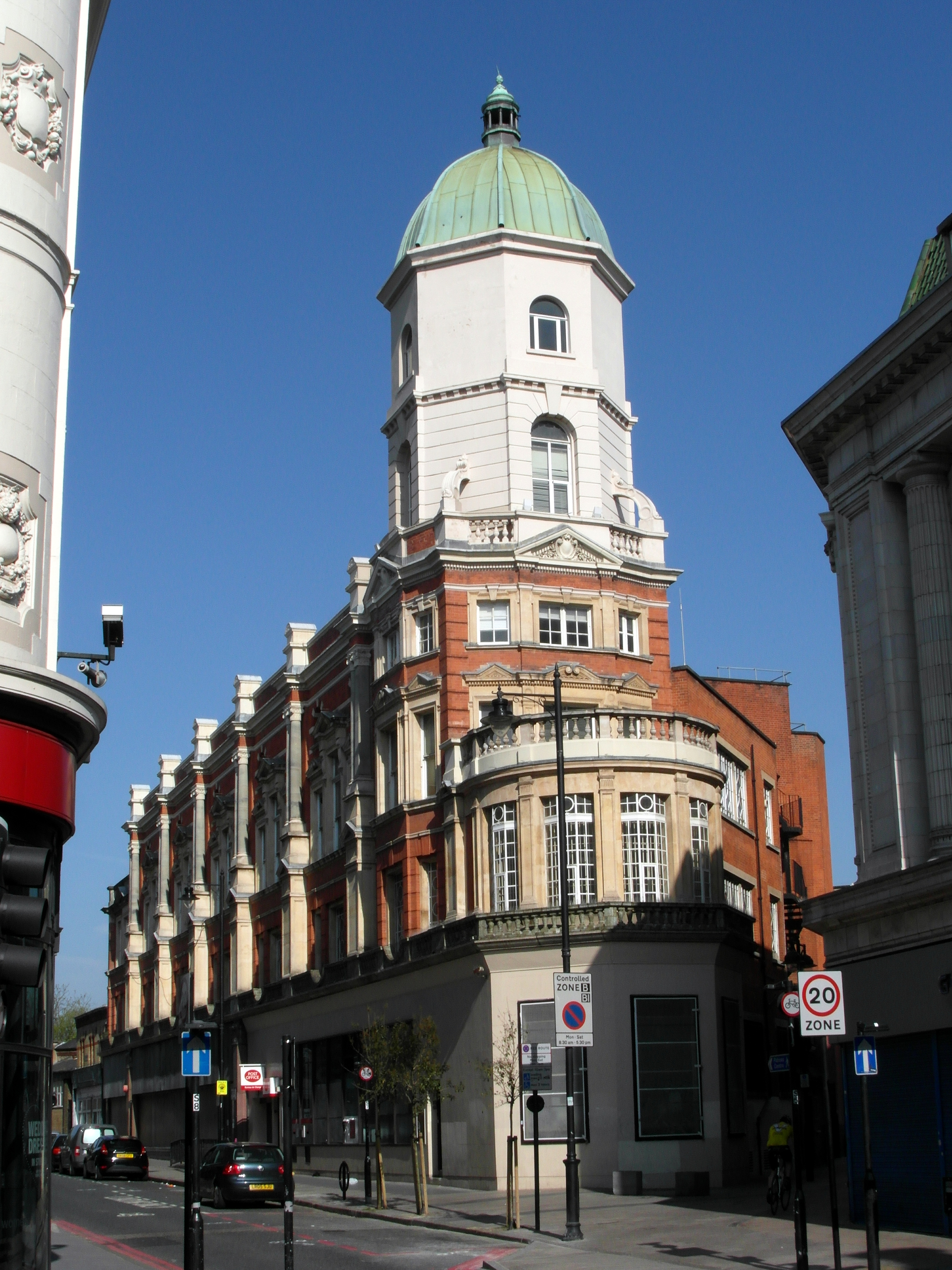
Toplin House before restoration in 2015-7

The Bon Marché was a department store based in Brixton, London, England. It was the first purpose-built department store in the city. The store was founded in 1877 by James Smith of Tooting after he won a fortune at Newmarket races. The store was named and modelled after Bon Marché in Paris. The store was not successful and Smith went bankrupt in 1892.

The new owners were more successful, eventually acquiring nearby stores Quin and Axtens and Pratts of Streatham. In 1926, the group was bought by the Selfridges Provincial Stores which in 1940 was taken over by the John Lewis Partnership. It closed in 1975. The building went on to be used as a market, retail units, a pub, and a business centre.

The store had two sales buildings: the main building of 1876-7 on the corner of Brixton Road and Ferndale Road, and the 'Furnishing Building' (from 1956 Toplin House) opposite. Toplin House was originally built to house the departments for furniture, furnishings, glass, china and ironmongery, and currently is known as The Department Store, with a bar, shop and offices above. It was restored by architects Squire & Partners in about 2015-7.

Violette Szabo, an SOE secret agent during the Second World War and posthumous recipient of the George Cross, was working at Bon Marché when the war started.
