= Cole Brothers =

Former department store in Sheffield, UK

Cole Brothers was a department store located in Sheffield in South Yorkshire, United Kingdom.

== Early history ==
The Cole brothers John and Thomas opened a silk mercer and hosier at 4 Fargate, Sheffield in 1847. Their brother Skelton almost immediately joined them in the business which grew rapidly, purchasing stores along Fargate and round into Church Street. The business had grown so much that in 1869, a rebuild of the stores was commissioned with a new frontage and an extra two stories. The business continued to expand with further stores added, and rebuilt to match the architecture of the store, and by 1898 the business was incorporated. However Skelton Cole did not see this achievement, dying in 1896, while his brother John died in 1898.

The business continued to be run by the Cole family, with two sons of the brothers Thomas and Thomas Skelton taking over the reins. By 1909, the business had started employing women, which was to be a benefit with the outbreak of the First World War looming. The business had also grown to local prominence with locals regarding the area as Cole's Corner, something that lives on to today. Technology was at the forefront of the store, with delivery vans being added in 1911, while the first cash registers arrived in 1916. The store continued to grow with a further two stories being added to the store in 1920, however, in the same year the business was sold to Harry Gordon Selfridge. The business transferred into his Selfridge Provincial Stores group in 1927.

== Acquisition ==
During the Second World War, Selfridges Provincial Stores group was bought by John Lewis. The Cole Brothers store was not damaged during the war. The business struggled like many during the early 1950s, but by 1960 the partners at Cole Brothers decided to open a new store. The new store located in Barker's Pool, opposite the City Hall, was designed by Yorke Rosenberg Mardall. The old store was sold in 1962 for £1 million and the business moved into its new premises on 17 September 1963.

In 1974, the store's offices were re-located out of the new building to increase store space. The store again expanded in 1977 when a shop was purchased on Cambridge Street to host the business's toy and sports departments. The store was refurbished in the early 1980s, however, the store struggled well into the 1990s due to the economic changes that happened in Sheffield at this time.

The store continued to operate as Cole Brothers until 2002, when the store was re-branded as John Lewis.
