= Energy and Utility Skills =

UK trade association

Energy & Utility Skills is an employer-led membership organization that promotes skills competency in the workforce of the United Kingdom's energy sector.

== Function ==
Energy & Utility Skills provides membership and skills solutions to help employers attract, develop and retain a sustainable, skilled workforce, as well as ensuring excellence in training in the UK energy and utilities industries.

Their 'Workforce Demand Estimates' estimate more than 312,300 additional skilled workers will be needed across the energy and utilities sector by the end of 2030.

Partnerships with employers, Government bodies and educational institutions ais to support the sector in maintaining a safe, skilled and sustainable workforce.

=== Industries ===
- Gas
- Power
- Water
- Waste Management

== Membership ==
The UK-wide membership consists of the major infrastructure companies within water, power, gas and waste management, and their delivery partners. This brings industries together to collectively identify and address the unique workforce renewal and skills challenges the sector faces. Energy & Utility Skills further support the sector by engaging with governments, regulators and other senior stakeholders to help develop an informed and supportive policy and regulatory environment.

== Structure ==
The Chief Executive of Energy & Utility Skills is Paul Cox. The headquarters of Energy & Utility Skills is in Solihull, West Midlands. Energy & Environment Awards and EUSR are both part of the Energy & Utility Skills Group.

The National Skills Academy for Power (NSAP) is also part of the Energy & Utility Skills Group.

== See also ==
- National Inspection Council for Electrical Installation Contracting, based in Bedfordshire, also known as the NICEIC
