= Pratts of Streatham =

Former department store in London

Coordinates: 51°25′53.07″N 0°7′46.27″W

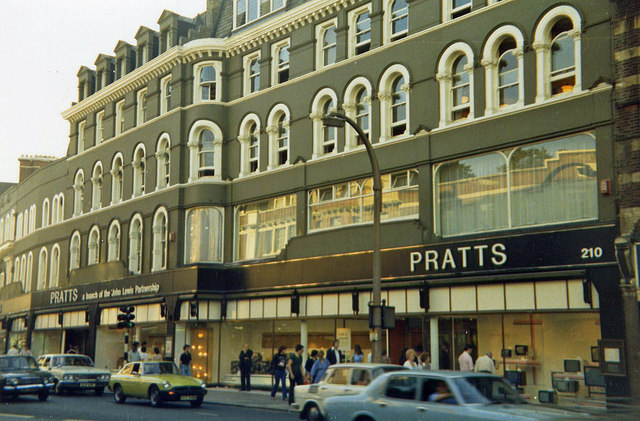
- Pratts department store, Streatham in 1978
- Location: Streatham High Road, London
- Opening date: 1850s
- Closing date: 1990; 36 years ago
- Interactive map of Pratts of Streatham

Pratts was a department store located in Streatham High Road, London. Established in the 1850s it became part of the John Lewis chain before its closure in 1990.

== Early history ==
George Pratt arrived in Streatham from Silchester at the age of 13 to start an apprenticeship in the drapery trade with William Reynolds in Bedford Row on Streatham High Road. Within eleven years Pratt had purchased the business and was the sole owner, but Streatham was only a sleepy village with a population of 7000. The Railways arrived in 1856 and within 50 years the population had grown to 71,000.

With the growth of Streatham, George purchased two shops on the opposite side of the High Road which he called Eldon House. This was the start of great expansion with his sons Henry and Charles joining the business and the store expanding into neighbouring shop premises. The original shops on Bedford Row were retained by the family where men's and boys’ outfitting departments were later established.

In 1912 the business was incorporated and the store at Eldon House continued to expand. Pratts Ltd diversified to offer a greater range of products which included a funeral service. Pratts was acquired by Brixton department store Bon Marché (Brixton) for £90,000 in 1919.

The Bon Marche group of three department stores, including Pratts, was bought by the Selfridge Provincial Stores group in 1926. Under Selfridge control the store was further extended and advertising and special promotions were carried out on a regular basis. Fourteen years later, however, the Provincial Stores group collapsed and was purchased by the expanding John Lewis Partnership in 1940.

== Under John Lewis ==
Although World War II had started and there were difficulties in purchasing the necessary goods for a store to survive, Pratts grew during the war. They closed a staff hostel that had occupied part of the store to increase the selling space available. Pratts was not damaged during The Blitz on London, and put itself at the forefront of community funding initiatives to help the war effort.

After the war the business continued to grow and space for expansion became a recurring problem. The largest part of the building did not extend above the ground floor. Restrictions to development at the original site prompted the move of several departments out of the main store for a number of years.

Initiatives to increase space in the main building included the 1973 purchase of houses in Ockley Road onto the sites of which the store might have been extended. Planning permission was refused, however, until 1985. By this time the Partnership was developing a vision for its future into which the Pratts business was becoming a poor strategic fit. The store remained a profitable branch of the Partnership up until closure on 28 July 1990. Most of the 400 partners working at the store were redeployed to other John Lewis stores.

The building itself was demolished in 1996, and was replaced by retail units occupied by Argos, Lidl and Peacocks with flats above. The Prentis Road range was replaced by a doctors' surgery. The houses and extensive gardens that were at the rear of the store were replaced with a car park and service areas.
