= Rita Clifton =

British business executive

Rita Clifton CBE
- Born: January 30, 1958 (age 68); High Wycombe, England
- Education: Newnham College, Cambridge
- Occupations: Advertising professional; Speaker; writer; non-Executive Director
- Known for: Former Chair of Interbrand; Co-founder of BrandCap
- Children: 2

Rita Ann Clifton CBE (born 30 January 1958) is a British advertising professional and a former chair of Interbrand, who currently works as a speaker, facilitator, writer, and non-executive director of a portfolio of companies.

Clifton has been called 'The doyenne of branding' by Campaign Magazine, 'Brand guru' by the Financial Times, and the Daily Telegraph described her as 'The brand leading the brands'.

== Early life ==
Rita Clifton was born in High Wycombe. Her childhood ambition was to be a ballet dancer. Her father died when she was 12.

She attended the Wycombe High School, a girls' grammar school in High Wycombe, alma mater of Fifty Shades of Grey author E. L. James, who was five years below her. She went to the all-female Newnham College, Cambridge, where she studied classics, graduating in 1979.

== Career ==
From 1983 to 1986 she worked for JWT. From 1986 to 1997 Clifton worked for Saatchi & Saatchi in a variety of roles, including acting as vice chairman from 1995 to 1997. She joined Interbrand UK as Chief Executive in 1997, becoming chairman in 2002 for a ten-year stint. In 2013, she co-founded the global brand and business consultancy BrandCap, which she later sold on to the management group. She holds a number of non-executive directorships at companies such as Bupa Nationwide Building Society, and ASOS.com. She has been Chairman of Populus Ltd, President of the Market Research Society. and previously served as a non-executive director of Dixons Retail from 2002 to 2012.

She has always had a keen interest in the environment and sustainability, and she has served as a Trustee on the board of WWF-UK, on the Sustainable Development Commission and as chair of the community volunteering organisation TCV (The Conservation Volunteers).

Clifton previously served as a non-executive director of Dixons Retail from 2002 to 2012.

In November 2020, international sustainability non-profit Forum for the Future announced that she joined the organisation as chair of the board of trustees.

In December 2020, it was announced she joined The John Lewis Partnership in February 2021 as deputy chairman.

== Publications ==
- The Future of Brands: Twenty-Five Visions, ISBN 0814737668, 208pp, 31 March 2000, New York University Press
- The Economist: Brands and Branding , ISBN 1846681197, 304pp, 19 March 2009, Economist Books
- Love Your Imposter: Be your best self, flaws and all, ISBN 9781789667004, 288pp, 10 September 2020, Kogan Page

== Personal life ==
Clifton met Brian Astley, the father of her two daughters, Alexandra, born November 1987, and Elizabeth, born April 1991, while they were working together on the Rowntree account at Saatchi. The couple married in August 1999 in Kensington and Chelsea.

In an interview with the Daily Telegraph in September 2002, Clifton described herself as the most senior woman to have a baby at Saatchi, and said she was back at her desk 10 weeks after giving birth. "I felt obliged to pretend that it had had absolutely no impact whatsoever," she said. "I did want to come back to work, but probably not that soon."

Clifton was appointed a CBE in the 2014 New Year Honours list.
