= National Skills Academy for Power =

- Abbreviation: NSAP
- Formation: March 2010
- Type: Trade training academy
- Legal status: Non-profit company (No. 7171687)
- Purpose: Training for the energy industry
- Headquarters: Friars Gate, 1011 Stratford Road, Solihull, B90 4BN
- Region served: UK
- Chief Executive: Phil Beach
- Affiliations: EU Skills
- Website: https://www.euskills.co.uk/

The National Skills Academy for Power is a skills academy for the energy and power industry in the UK.

== History ==
The National Skills Academy for Power (NSAP) was first announced in October 2008 by the Department for Innovation, Universities and Skills. Steve K Davies was made the Chief Executive in September 2009. It was given formal government approval on 18 March 2010.

It was the 15th National Skills Academy. £2.9 million of funding for the project was allocated from the government. The Skills Academy was match funded by the energy and utility sector. Within 2.5 years NSAP became financially independent and continues to operate under the umbrella of the Sector Skills Council, Energy and Utility Skills

NSAP held its first Annual Conference and Awards Dinner on 9 March 2011 at Twickenham Stadium hosted by Sir Clive Woodward. This also included the inaugural "People in Power Awards".

== Structure ==
It is based near Monkspath on the A34.

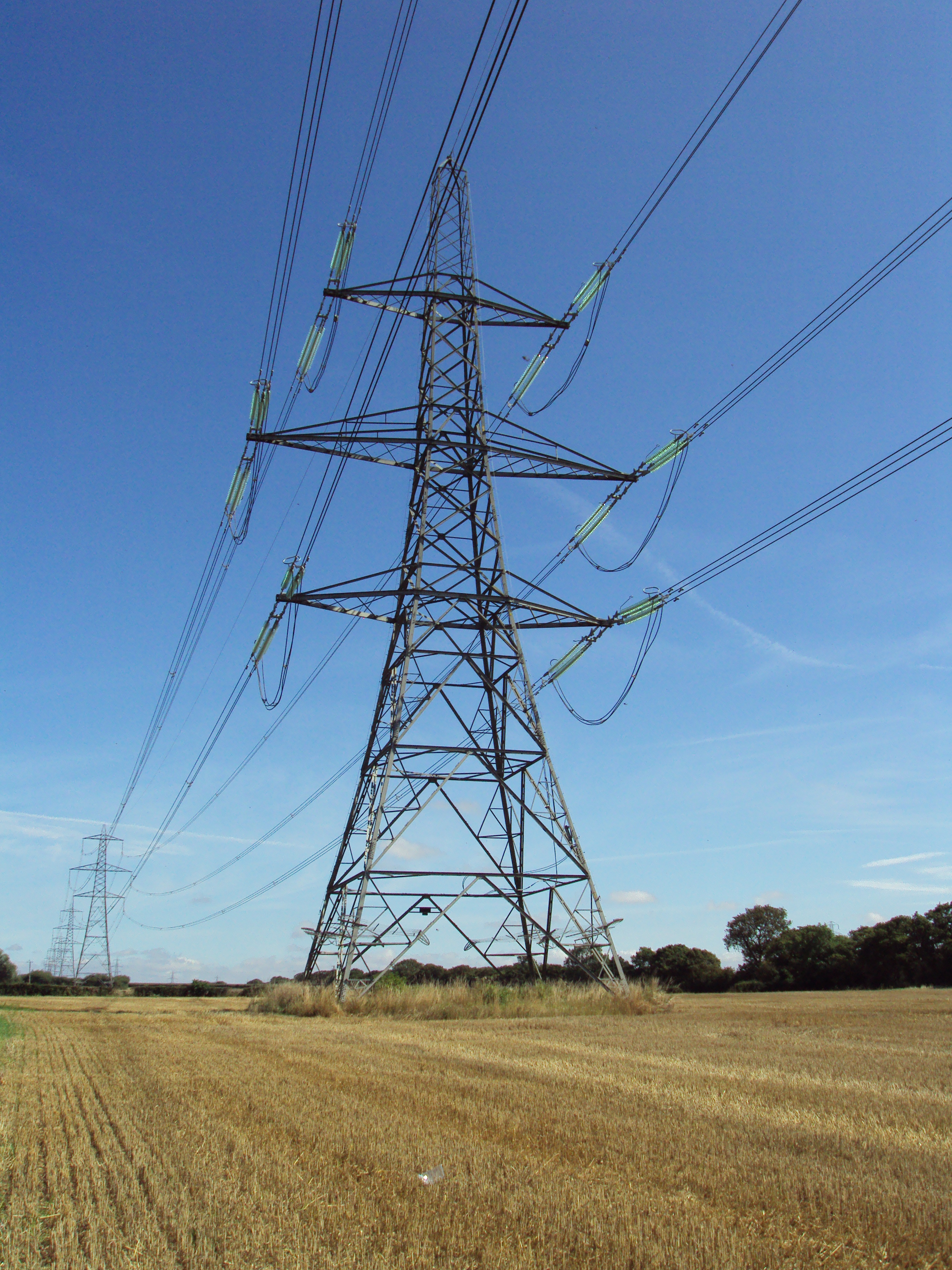
Power line near Shotwick in Cheshire

It is a partnership between the Sector Skills Council, Energy and Utility Skills, and several energy companies:

- Alstom
- Morrison Utility Services (based in Stevenage)
- E.ON UK
- Scottish Power
- CE Electric UK
- Carillion Utility Services
- National Grid plc
- EDF Energy
- ABB Group
- Balfour Beatty Utility Solutions
- Scottish and Southern Energy
- Morgan Sindall
- ITI Energy

It also works in conjunction with the IET Power Academy, which was set up in 2004, an industry group that was formed by seven universities (Bath, Cardiff, Imperial College London, Manchester, Queen's University Belfast, Southampton and Strathclyde) and eighteen power companies.

== Function ==
It seeks to focus and coordinate UK-wide training in the power sector by standardising training materials. It also promotes the industry sector, specifically its career choices, in a way similar to a trade association. Similar work, on a much broader focus, is carried out by the Institution of Engineering and Technology (IET).

== See also ==
- Association of Electricity Producers - trade association
- Renewable Energy Association
- Renewable energy in the United Kingdom
- Energy in the United Kingdom
- Lists of power stations in the United Kingdom
- NSAP address
