= Sharon White, Baroness White of Tufnell Park =

British CEO and former civil servant (born 1967)

The Right Honourable The Baroness White of Tufnell Park DBE
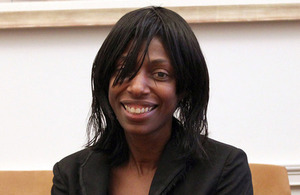

Member of the House of Lords
- Lord Temporal
- Life peerage 17 July 2025

Chairman of the John Lewis Partnership
- In office 4 February 2020 – 12 September 2024
- Preceded by: Charlie Mayfield
- Succeeded by: Jason Tarry

Chief Executive of the Ofcom
- In office March 2015 – November 2019
- Preceded by: Ed Richards
- Succeeded by: Melanie Dawes

Second Permanent Secretary of HM Treasury
- In office 2013–2015
- Chancellor: George Osborne
- Preceded by: Tom Scholar
- Succeeded by: John Kingman

Personal details
- Born: Sharon Michele White; 21 April 1967 (age 59) London, United Kingdom
- Party: None (crossbencher)
- Spouse: Sir Robert Chote (m. 1997)
- Children: 2
- Education: University of Cambridge (BA); University College London (MSc)
- Profession: Economist

Sharon Michele White, Baroness White of Tufnell Park, DBE (born 21 April 1967) is a British businesswoman, economist, and civil servant. She is the current Senior Managing Director and Head of Global Affairs at the Caisse de dépôt et placement du Québec (CDPQ) in London. She was previously the sixth Chairman of the John Lewis Partnership and Chief Executive of Ofcom. In July 2025, she was created a life peer, sitting in the House of Lords as a crossbencher.

== Early life and education ==
White was born in east London, England, and brought up in Leyton, London. Her parents migrated to the UK from Jamaica in the 1950s as part of the Windrush generation. She attended Connaught School for Girls for three years when it was a middle school, followed by Leyton Senior High School for Girls. She studied economics at Fitzwilliam College, Cambridge, graduating with a Bachelor of Arts (BA) degree in 1988. She later studied for a Master of Science (MSc) degree in economics at University College London, graduating in 1993.

== Career ==
White first worked for a church after university, before joining the British civil service in 1989. She worked first at the Treasury and later for the British Embassy in Washington. She also worked at the 10 Downing Street policy unit during the Blair government as an advisor on welfare reform from 1997 to 1999, at the World Bank as a senior economist from 1999 to 2002, and as director general (first policy then welfare to work) at the Department for International Development from 2003 to 2009. She later worked at the Ministry of Justice, the Department for International Development, and the Department for Work and Pensions.

At HM Treasury, White was director general for Public Spending (2012–2013), and became Second Permanent Secretary in 2013, overseeing the government's response to the 2008 financial crisis. She was the first black person and second woman to hold the post.

=== Ofcom (2015–2019) ===
In December 2014, White was appointed Chief Executive of Ofcom, succeeding Ed Richards. She led Ofcom from 2015 to 2019, overseeing reforms in the UK communications and media sector.

=== John Lewis Partnership (2020–2024) ===
In June 2019, it was announced that White would be stepping down from her role at Ofcom to replace Sir Charlie Mayfield as the sixth chair of the John Lewis Partnership. It was confirmed that White would be awarded an annual salary of £990,000 for her role at the John Lewis Partnership, a significant increase on her previous salary, which was £341,700 according to data released by Ofcom.

White succeeded Mayfield as chair of the John Lewis Partnership on 4 February 2020. Her tenure included overseeing strategic restructuring during a period of financial challenges for the retailer, including the suspension of staff bonuses and the temporary removal of the "Never Knowingly Undersold" policy. She stepped down in September 2024, earlier than initially planned, following the appointment of Jason Tarry as her successor.

=== Later career (2025–present) ===
In November 2024, it was announced that White would join the Canadian pension fund manager Caisse de dépôt et placement du Québec (CDPQ) as managing director and Head of Europe, effective 27 January 2025. Later in 2025, she was promoted to senior managing director and Head of Global Affairs, based in London, representing CDPQ in its international markets and stakeholder engagements.

On 17 July 2025, she was created a life peer as Baroness White of Tufnell Park, of Tufnell Park in the London Borough of Islington. She sits in the House of Lords as a crossbencher. She made her maiden speech on 18 December 2025 during a debate on the Pension Schemes Bill.

== Recognition and honours ==
White was appointed Dame Commander of the Order of the British Empire (DBE) in the 2020 New Year Honours for public service. She topped the 2023 Powerlist of the 100 most influential Black Britons. She has also appeared regularly in previous editions of the list since 2016.

== Other appointments ==
White is a visiting fellow of Nuffield College, Oxford. She was appointed as a Non-Executive Director of Barratt Developments in 2018. She also serves as Non-Executive Chair of Frontier Economics and is on the board of Sadler's Wells Theatre.

== Personal life ==
White married economist Robert Chote in 1997, when both were working in Washington, D.C. They have two sons. The couple have been referred to in the media as “Mr and Mrs Treasury.”

Government offices
Preceded by Ed Richards	Chief Executive of Ofcom; 2015 – 2019	Succeeded by Jonathan Oxley (interim)
Business positions
Preceded by Sir Charlie Mayfield	Chairman of John Lewis Partnership; 2020 – 2024	Succeeded by Jason Tarry
