= International Resources for Fairer Trade =

Non-profit organisation

International Resources for Fairer Trade (IRFT) is a non-profit organisation registered as a Public Charitable Trust under the Bombay Public Charitable Trust Act. It was founded by Kirit Dave and Jan Simmonds in October 1995. Vinita Singh was the first Director of IRFT during the period 1996-2002 and tied up with DFID, and Traidcraft. Arun Raste succeeded her as the Director in IRFT and was heading the organisation till 2008, during which time IRFT opened 2nd office in Hyderabad and forged partnership with Hivos, BTC and Oxfam. During the tenure of Arun Raste, IRFT also forged partnerships with SAI, FLO, Better Cotton Initiative and FLA.

IRFT gives farmers and artisans access to mainstream markets worldwide, by partnering with W.F.T.Organizations (in U.K., U.S.A., Netherlands & Germany). Large corporates are encouraged to inculcate social responsibility and ethical working as their core values. IRFT works with both ends of the supply chain by representing the producer as well as the consumer.

IRFT participates in the market economy and works closely with farmers and artisans to develop in them the skills to sell their products. Thus giving them access to a sustainable and stable livelihood. Through its approach towards ethical standards in factories and farms that represent producers, IRFT conducts ethical audits, provides code of conduct trainings and verifier training on remediation and continuous improvement. Some of their leading brand partners are Levi Strauss, Nike, Marks and Spencer, Reebok and Burberry.

== Mission ==
IRFT's mission is to empower farmers, artisans, companies and NGOs to develop business capacity and promote sustainable livelihoods for all of those involved in producing the goods we consume every day.

== Fair trade principles ==
• Creating opportunities for economically disadvantaged producers marginalized by the conventional trading system

• Transparency and accountability between trading partners

• Capacity building to make producers independent of external aid

• Creating awareness about Fair Trade

• Payment of a fair price

• Gender Equity, making sure the work of women is justly valued and compensated

• Ensuring safe and healthy working conditions

• Encouraging better environmental practices and the application of responsible methods of production.

• Maintaining and developing trade Relations

== Pro Sustain ==
Pro-Sustain, is an initiative by Hivos (Netherlands), IRFT India, FTF-I, and associate Shop For Change to contribute to building environmentally sustainable production and consumption that helps reduce poverty amongst poor farmers and handicraft producers in India.

The specific objective of the Pro-Sustain project is to create a consumer market for fair trade products in India that measurably contributes to the improvement of rural livelihoods and provides farmers and artisans with the resources necessary to follow environmentally sustainable production practices.

Following on the premise laid out in the rationale for the overall objective, the project is built on the belief that the market forces, which have in many cases excluded the needs of poor farmers and handicrafts artisans, can actually be harnessed to create inclusive growth and environmentally sustainable production by creating consumer demand for sustainably produced, fair trade products. By implementing a strategic marketing plan that includes events, targeted consumer outreach, and creative promotions, alongside a distribution strategy to make fair trade products easily available to consumers. The project should shift consumer buying patterns towards sustainable consumption in order to achieve its objective.
