= UK Commission for Employment and Skills =

UK Commission for Employment and Skills (UKCES)
- Abbreviation: UKCES
- Formation: 1 April 2008; 18 years ago
- Type: Quango
- Legal status: Company limited by guarantee (No.6425800)
- Purpose: Producing labour market intelligence; increasing employer investment in skills and providing strategic advice and insight on skills and employment issues throughout the UK
- Headquarters: Renaissance House
- Location: Adwick Park, Wath-upon-Dearne, S63 5NB
- Region served: UK
- Members: Sector Skills Councils
- Chief Executive: Ian Kinder
- Main organ: Commission (Chairman - Charlie Mayfield)
- Parent organization: Department for Business, Innovation and Skills, Department for Work and Pensions, Department for Education, Department for Employment and Learning
- Affiliations: Sector Skills Councils
- Budget: £63.5 million(2011-2)
- Website: UKCES

The UK Commission for Employment and Skills was a non-departmental public body that provided advice on skills and employment policy to the UK Government and the Devolved Administrations.

The UK Commission for Employment and Skills closed in March 2017.

== History ==
Created on 1 April 2008, registered as a company on 13 November 2007, and subsequently closed in late 2016/ early 2017. UKCES was formed as a key recommendation of the 2006 Leitch Review of Skills, the UK Commission for Employment and Skills was an executive Non-Departmental Public Body which superseded the former Sector Skills Development Agency and the National Employment Panel. Government funding for UKCES was withdrawn in late 2016 which led to its inevitable closure.

It survived the 2010 Cabinet Office Review of Public Bodies, also known as the bonfire of the quangos, and was given the green light on 24 February 2011 to continue as a NDPB. Along with other NDPBs, it was subject to a triennial review conducted by HM Government.

Discussions around the closure of UKCES began in late 2015 with the release of the Public Spending Review and Autumn Spending Review 2015, where it was recommended that public funding be preserved instead for candidate participation. Throughout 2016 UKCES worked alongside government departments, its appointed Commissioners, stakeholders, and Nation representatives to either complete, wind down or migrate its functions.

The following UKCES areas of work have ceased following completion:

- Employer Ownership funded projects
- Industrial Partnership projects
- UK Futures Programme Projects

Although funding for these projects has ceased through UKCES the employer groups and intermediaries involved have in some instances continued to build upon, and take these projects forward independently.

The following UKCES areas of work have continued and have been / are currently being migrated elsewhere within Government:

- UK Wide Employer research (Such as the Employer Perspectives Survey and the Employer Skills Survey)
- Standards, Qualifications and Frameworks development (Such as National Occupational Standards, Scottish Vocational Qualifications and Apprenticeship Frameworks in Wales, Scotland and Northern Ireland).

The UK Commission for Employment and Skills also used to own Investors in People. IIP has subsequently become independent and continues as its own entity.

In its last few years UKCES was chaired by Sir Charlie Mayfield, Chairman of the John Lewis Partnership.

== Structure ==
The UK Commission was in its final years chaired by Sir Charlie Mayfield, Chairman of the John Lewis Partnership, who succeeded the inaugural chairman, Sir Michael Rake in November 2010. The Chief Executive is Ian Kinder. It was led by 30 Commissioners, comprising business people, trade unionists and education, employment and skills experts. Commissioners were appointed by government ministers.

== See also ==
- UK Commission for Employment and Skills
- National Occupational Standards
- Investors in People
- Skills Funding Agency
