= Honey Care Africa =

South African environmental organisation

Honey Care Africa was established in 2000 as a private sector social enterprise to promote sustainable community-based beekeeping in eastern Africa. In partnership with a number of local NGOs and international development and financial institutions, as well as the governments of Kenya and Tanzania, Honey Care undertakes village-level demonstrations and provides microfinance, training, and community-based extension services. Honey Care also provides a guaranteed market for the honey produced by small-holder farmers at fair trade prices. It collects the honey at the farm gate and pays for it on the spot, then processes, packs and sells the honey for a profit through supermarket chains and other industrial clients. Its "Honey Care Africa" and "Beekeeper's Delight" brands are well known in the East Africa region and have captured a significant market share.

== Area of operation ==
From its inception, Honey Care Africa had an explicit triple bottom-line agenda, with an emphasis on generating economic, social, and environmental value simultaneously through its activities.

In 2004, with support from the Swiss Foundation for Technical Cooperation and a patient capital loan from the International Finance Corporation, Honey Care expanded its operations beyond the borders of Kenya and successfully replicated its model in Tanzania. It has been working since 2013 in South Sudan.

Today Honey Care Africa employs close to 50 staff and has helped over 9,000 small-scale beekeepers (representing over 38,000 direct beneficiaries) earn a supplementary income of $180–250 per annum. For many, the income earned from honey production often makes the difference between living below or above the poverty line. Honey Care Africa is the largest producer of high quality honey in East Africa and among the largest exporters of beeswax in the Region.

== Awards and recognition ==
Honey Care Africa and its founders have received numerous international awards for their work, including:

- the Equator Initiative Prize at the World Summit on Sustainable Development (2002)
- the International Development Marketplace Innovation Award in partnership with Africa Now from the World Bank & Soros Open Societies Institute (2002)
- the World Business Award from the Prince of Wales International Business Leaders Forum and United Nations Development Programme (2004)

Honey Care also received the coveted "Kenya Quality Award" in the Small and Medium Enterprise Category from the Kenya Bureau of Standards (2004) and was named the "Top Small to Medium Sized Business in Africa" for 2005–06 at the SMME Awards in South Africa. It also received "First Prize in the Renewable Energy and Environment Category" at the same event.

Honey Care Africa has been featured on numerous occasions in the press and media including in the BBC, the Chicago Tribune, The Globe and Mail, Financial Times, CNBC Europe, CBC, UN Radio, Daily Nation, and East African Standard. It has been discussed in a number of academic journals, including the Stanford Social Innovation Review and the MIT Sloan Management Review, and has been featured in several books and other published academic works.
