= National Occupational Standards =

National Occupational Standards (NOS), also known as professional standards, specify UK standards of performance that people are expected to achieve in their work, and the knowledge and skills they need to perform effectively.

NOS, which are approved by UK government regulators, are available for almost every role in every sector in the UK.

== Components of NOS ==
According to the SSDA (the Sector Skills Development Agency, replaced in 2008 by the UK Commission for Employment and Skills and the Federation for Industry Sector Skills and Standards, comprising all nineteen sector skills councils), a unit of NOS must comprise:

- Title, reflecting the content of the NOS
- Overview, an introductory section providing a brief summary of the NOS to help the user judge whether it is relevant to them
- Performance criteria, defining in detail what is expected of the individual
- Knowledge and understanding, what the individual needs to know and/or understand to enable them to meet the performance criteria

NOS may also have sections covering:

- Scope, specifying the range of circumstances or situations that have a critical impact on the activity when carrying out the performance criteria
- Elements. A NOS can be divided into two or more discrete elements which describe the activities the person has to carry out.
- Values and behaviours, the personal attributes an individual is expected to demonstrate within the NOS.

== Using NOS ==
NOS can be used to support any and all human resource management and development activities.

NOS are also used in the UK as the basis for National Vocational Qualifications and Scottish Vocational Qualifications.

== See also ==
- International Standard Classification of Occupations
- Qualifications and Credit Framework - replacement for National Qualifications Framework, soon to be replaced itself
