= Sector skills council =

Sector skills councils (SSCs) are employer-led organisations that cover specific industries in the United Kingdom. They were introduced by Adult Skills Minister, Rt Hon John Healey MP in 2002, while the author of the policy was Tom Bewick, an education and skills adviser to the Labour Government, 1997–2002.

The SSCs have four key goals:

1. To support employers in developing and managing apprenticeship standards
2. To reduce skills gaps and shortages and improve productivity
3. To boost the skills of their sector workforces
4. To improve learning supply including apprenticeships, higher education and National Occupational Standards (NOS).

SSCs aim to achieve these goals by developing an understanding of the future skills needs in their industry, and contributing to the development of National Occupational Standards, the design and approval of apprenticeship frameworks and the New Apprenticeship Standards and creating sector qualification strategies. There are currently eighteen SSCs, covering about 80 per cent of the British workforce. SSCs are licensed by the government through the UK Commission for Employment and Skills (UKCES).

The Sector Skills Development Agency (SSDA) was formerly responsible for funding, supporting and monitoring SSCs and for overseeing industries that fell outside an SSC footprint. In 2008, the SSDA was replaced by the UKCES and the Federation for Industry Sector Skills and Standards - now known as the Skills Federation - comprising all nineteen sector skills councils.

The Skills Federation is responsible for managing the process of certifying apprentices on apprenticeship frameworks in England, Scotland and Wales. It seeks to:

- Promote professional practices among those organisations that are sector-based, and which set and maintain skills standards
- Manage the standards of those Employer-Led Partnerships that maintain these standards to ensure high quality
- Provide insight, intelligence and ideas flow between the governments of the four nations and the SSCs.
