= William Lefevre =

Former department store in Canterbury

William Lefevre Ltd
- Company type: Private company
- Industry: Retail
- Genre: Department store
- Founded: 1875
- Fate: Purchased by Drapery Trust in 1926, before becoming part of Debenhams in 1928.
- Headquarters: Canterbury
- Parent: Debenhams

William Lefevre was a department store founded in 1875 that was located in Canterbury, England. The store became part of the Drapery Trust in 1926, with the trust itself being purchased by Debenhams in 1927. The store expanded with a further branch in Gillingham, Kent in 1939, before the stores were re-branded under the Debenhams name plate in 1973.

== History ==
William Lefevre, a son of a grocer, was born in Canterbury in 1847. After serving his apprenticeship with a draper in the Marylebone area of London, Lefevre was employed to run a Millinery business in Marylebone. While in London he met and married Frances Arnett, a daughter of a master tailor, and would go on and have 15 children. William returned to Canterbury in 1875, purchasing an existing drapery business in Sun Street.

William's family followed suit by opening drapery and wool business' in other parts of the city. By 1899 the business had stores in Sun Street, Mercury Street and Guildhall Street. The company expected its employees to work long hours, and most staff worked over 68 hours a week, with the business operating until late on Saturdays.

William died in 1911 and his son Charles took over the running of the business. In the 1920s the business took on a massive project by combining their Guildhall store with the Philosophical and Literary Institution and Museum, the Theatre Royal & the Guildhall Tavern. The plans to merge these together caused much opposition. The new store with amended frontage was opened in 1926 and designed by local architects Jenning & Gray, however parts of the original buildings can still be seen, including the Egyptian Windows from the original Institute building. The business was bought by the Drapery Trust in 1926, which was purchased by Debenhams in 1927. During the 1930s the store became part of Debenhams Group C, under the management of F. J. Pope, which grouped Lefevre's with Bon Marche of Gloucester, Spooners of Plymouth, Edwin Jones of Southampton, Footman Pretty of Ipswich, Curl Brothers of Norwich, Jones of Bristol, Pauldens of Manchester, Arnolds of Great Yarmouth, Smiths of Nuneaton, Stratford and Bedworth. The business expanded further with opening a branch in Gillingham, Kent in 1939.

After World War II, the store expanded into the former Congregational Church which had been built in 1876. During the war, Peter Lefevre, son of chairman Charles Lefevre was lost in action. The company proposed to expand into Canterbury further in 1962, when they applied to demolish no. 4 and 4 Sun Street but the plans were rejected by the council. In March 1973 the business was re-branded under the Debenhams brand as part of their rationalisation programme.
