= Plummer Roddis =

Former department store chain

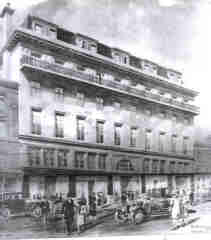
The Plummer Roddis building in Hastings, 1927

Plummer Roddis was a chain of department stores based in the South of England which was acquired by the Drapery Trust, before being absorbed by its parent company Debenhams.

== History ==
Plummer Roddis began as separate companies in the 19th Century. William Plummer started out as a draper in Hastings and in 1871 had a store at 3 Robertson Street before opening another shop in Southampton on the corner of Above Bar and Commercial Street. George Roddis was listed, in 1870, as a draper in Market Harborough. By 1881 he had become a partner in Roddis & Goldsmith, drapers and milliners, at 1-2 Robertson Street, Hastings.

In 1896 William Plummer, George Roddis and Reginald Tyrrell, a Bournemouth draper, joined forces to create Plummer, Roddis & Tyrrell Limited. This new business was formed to purchase the stores in which the various partners already had an interest, Plummer & Lawford of Eastbourne; R. Tyrrell & Sons of Bournemouth and Boscombe and Plummer, Roddis & Beecroft of Hastings and Folkestone. Two years later, however, Reginald Tyrrell relinquished his interest in the company to concentrate on his other burgeoning business, Tyrrell & Green, in Southampton. At this point the remaining partners changed the name of the company to Plummer Roddis Limited. Plummer Roddis had become a well known name along the south coast of England by the time it secured a mention in 'Kipps: The Story of a Simple Soul' by H. G. Wells in 1905.

In 1914, the company reported profits of £19,208. By 1919, however, this figure had almost trebled, to £56,927, paying a dividend of 10%. The business continued to expand with the purchase of Sharmans of Brighton in December 1919.

In 1927 the flagship Hastings store was rebuilt to a design by architect Henry Ward (he also designed additions to the Brighton store), while the Southampton and Bournemouth branches were extensively rebuilt. The last building work to be completed before World War II was the extension at Bournemouth in 1938. The head office of the Plummer Roddis group at this time was at Sillwood Road, Brighton.

By 1928, the business had become part of the Drapery Trust, owned by Debenhams. The new parent company supported the continuing development of the Plummer Roddis group with the addition of a new branch at Weymouth (formerly Robert R. Talbot) in 1928.

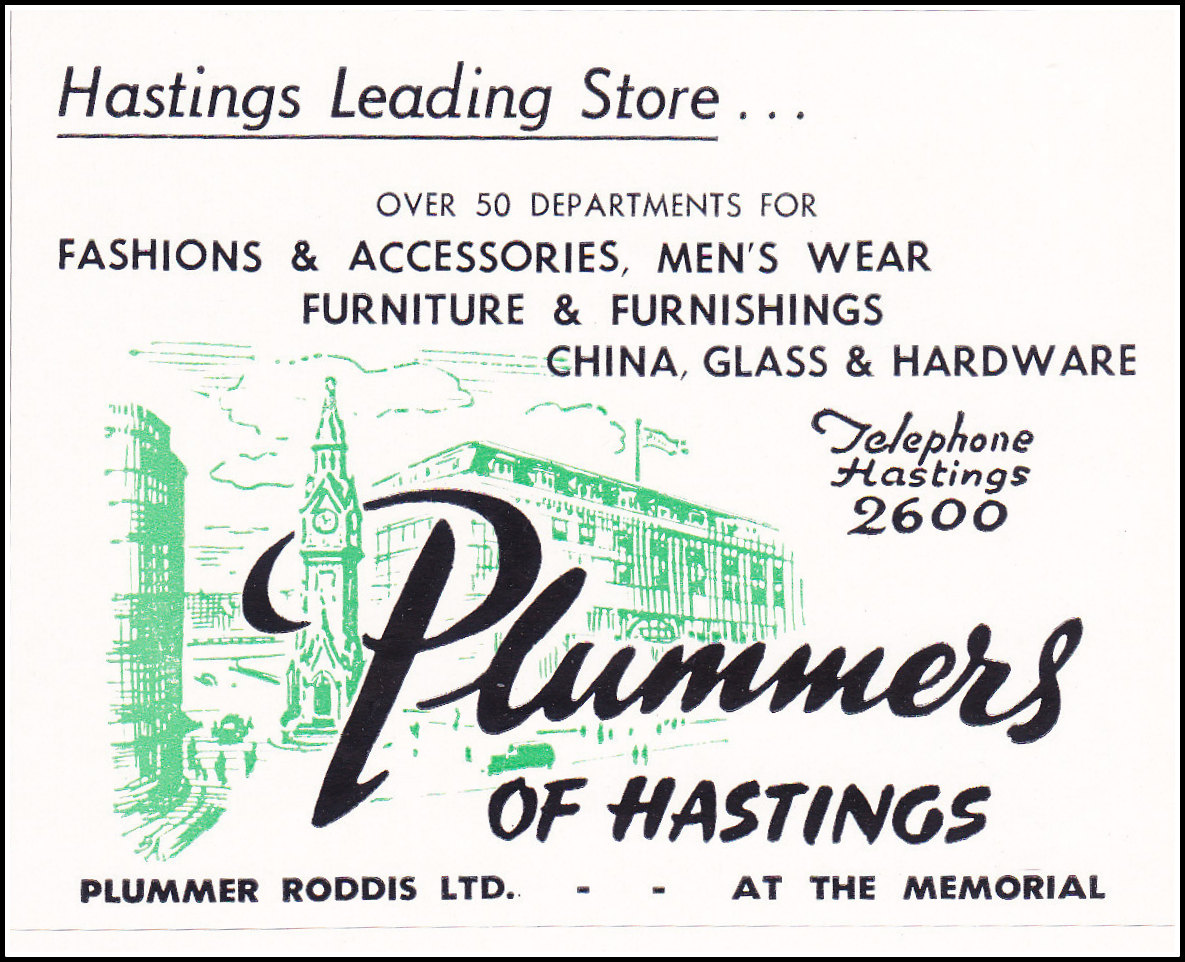
Advert for Plummers in Hastings

During the Second World War the Southampton store was completely destroyed by German bombing. Trading continued thereafter from a scattering of temporary locations across the city until a new permanent store could eventually be completed.

The acquisition of stores in new locations helped supplement trade and counter the wartime damage endured by existing parts of the business. The number of branches increased with various purchases made during the war years:

- 1941 - F. Ealand, Bath
- 1941 - Frederick Taylor, Yeovil
- 1942 - W. Percival Clark, Andover
- 1943 - C. Morrish & Son, Lewes
- 1943 - T. A. Brown & Sons, Winchester

Parent company Debenhams extended the group's presence on the south coast after the war, adding a store at Southsea, in 1956. A further store was opened in the Essex seaside town of Southend-on-Sea after the announcement made in 1963 of a joint building development with grocers Garons and British Railways. The completion of the new Southampton store in 1965 was followed by another substantial investment, this time at Guildford, where a new department store of 230,000 square feet was constructed alongside the River Wey. The new Plummer Roddis Guildford opened in 1968.

The 1970s were a period of great change for the Debenhams business as rationalisation and plans for a nationally visible brand identity across the group were implemented. The Plummer Roddis Southsea store was closed in 1970 and sold at auction.

In the early 1970s the stores were rebranded, as Debenhams, except in Southampton where Edwin Jones took on the national name. In 1972 the Bournemouth store was relaunched as a Debenhams, by Terry Wogan, only to be closed down a year later when Debenhams decided to rebrand the Bobby & Co. store in the town. The Boscombe branch had been closed the previous year.

The Southampton store continued to operate under the Plummers name after a management buyout, but eventually closed on 14 August 1993. The site has since been redeveloped as a teaching centre (known as the Sir James Matthews Building) for Solent University but this was taken over in 2022 by the University of Southampton.

By 2000 only Hastings and Guildford, the first and last stores of the Plummer Roddis group to be opened respectively, continued to trade as Debenhams. Both closed in 2020.
