= Debenhams =

British department store chain (1778–2021)

Debenhams plc
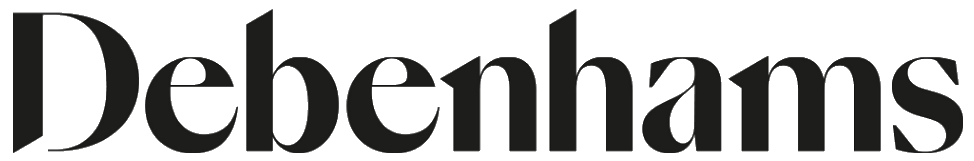

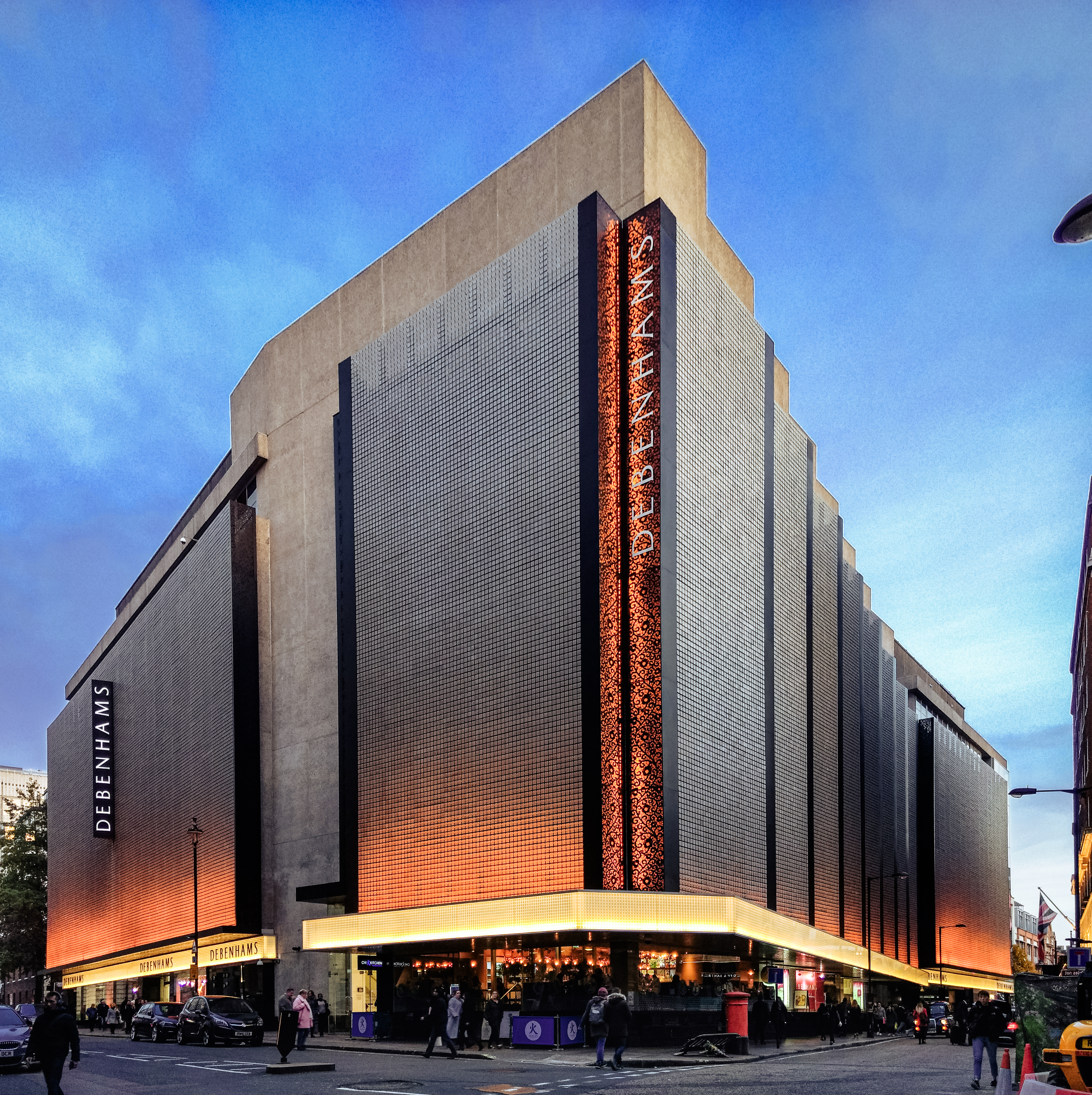
- Debenhams' former flagship store on Oxford Street, London
- Trade name: Debenhams plc (2006–2019)
- Type: Private limited company
- Traded as: LSE: DEB (2006–2019)
- Industry: Fashion online retail Beauty store
- Founded: 1778; 248 years ago (by William Clark); 1813; 213 years ago (as Clark & Debenham)
- Founder: William Clark; William Debenham
- Defunct: 15 May 2021; 5 years ago
- Fate: Liquidation, brand name bought by Boohoo.com
- Successor: Debenhams.com
- Headquarters: 334–348 Oxford Street, London, England, UK
- Area served: UK; Denmark; more
- Key people: Mark Gifford (Chairman); Stefaan Vansteenkiste (CEO)
- Products: Fashion clothing; shoes; toys; accessories; cosmetics; Gifts; Electricals; home and furniture
- Revenue: £2,277.0 million (2018)
- Operating income: £43.4 million (2018)
- Net income: £(461.0) million (2018)
- Number of employees: 25,000 (2019)
- Parent: Celine Jersey Topco Limited
- Website: www.debenhams.com; operated by Boohoo as Debenhams.com

Debenhams plc was a British department store chain that operated in the United Kingdom, Ireland and Denmark, as well as franchised locations across Europe and the Asia Pacific.

The company was founded in 1778 as a single store in London and grew to 178 locations across those countries, also owning the Danish department store chain Magasin du Nord. In its final years, its headquarters were within the premises of its flagship store in Oxford Street, London. The range of goods sold included middle-to-high-end clothing, beauty, household items, and furniture.

The company suffered financial difficulties in the 21st century and entered administration twice, in April 2019 and April 2020. In November 2020, Debenhams' main concession operator Arcadia also entered administration, leading to the collapse of potential rescue talks with JD Sports and Frasers Group. As a result, Debenhams announced it would be liquidated.

The Debenhams brand and website were purchased by the online retailer Boohoo for £55M in January 2021. However, Boohoo did not retain any stores, meaning the loss of up to 12,000 jobs. Boohoo relaunched the website as Debenhams.com on 12 April 2021 under its own company, Debenhams.com Online Limited, when Debenhams' stores reopened to begin closing down sales following a relaxation of some COVID-19 restrictions. After 243 years in business, the remaining Debenhams department stores closed for the final time during May 2021.

Until 2025, Debenhams continued in the Middle East through a licensing agreement, operated by Alshaya Group.

== History ==
=== 18th and 19th centuries ===
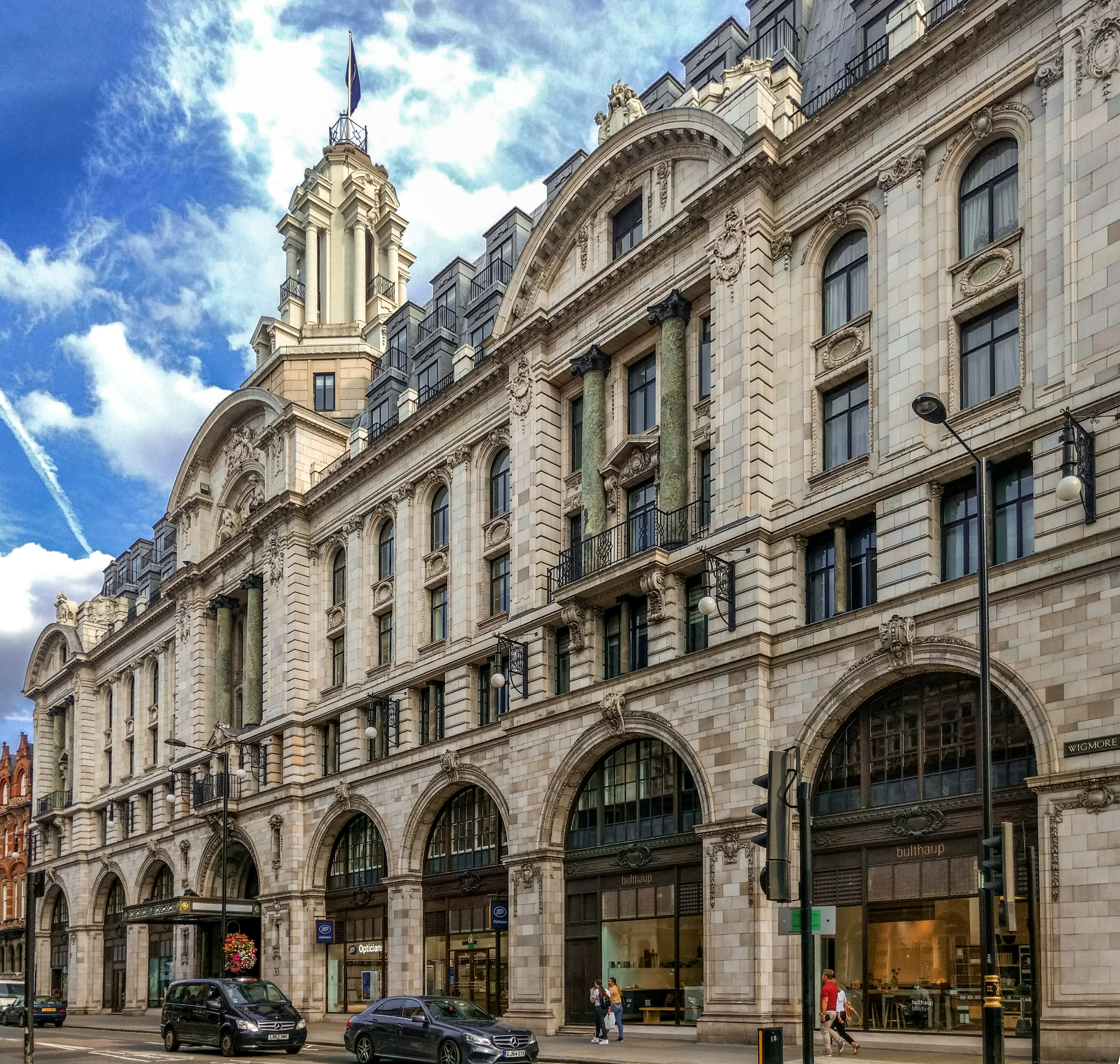
The former Debenham, Son & Freebody building in Wigmore Street which was completed in 1908

The business was formed in 1778 by William Clark, who began trading at 44 Wigmore Street in London as a drapers' store. In 1813, William Debenham became a partner and the corporate name changed to Clark & Debenham. The shop was later renamed Cavendish House and sold drapery, silks, haberdashery, millinery, hosiery, lace, and family mourning goods. As the trade grew, the partners determined to expand the business by opening branches in Cheltenham and Harrogate.

By 1823, Clark & Debenham had opened a small drapery business at 3 Promenade Rooms, Cheltenham, selling a selection of silks, muslins, shawls, gloves, lace and fancy goods. In 1837, Clark retired from the business and Debenham took two of his most trusted staff, William Pooley and John Smith, as partners, trading in both London and Cheltenham as Debenham, Pooley & Smith. By 1840, the management of the Cheltenham branch appears to have been given to Clement Freebody, Debenham's brother-in-law. Around 1843, another branch shop was launched in Harrogate.

Extended and refurbished premises opened in Cheltenham in October 1844. Pooley and Smith retired from the business in 1851 when Debenham took his son, William, and Clement Freebody into partnership, trading as Debenham, Son & Freebody. At this time all three shops in London, Cheltenham, and Harrogate were trading in similar goods and issued a joint catalogue, called the Fashion Book, that was the basis of an extensive mail-order trade. In 1876 when Freebody retired, a new partnership, Debenham & Hewitt, was formed. George Hewitt appears to have worked at the Cheltenham store as a draper's assistant during the early 1860s but details of his subsequent career are not known. By 1883, George Hewitt was the sole owner of the Cheltenham business, Frank and William Debenham having withdrawn to manage the London store as a separate concern.

=== 20th century ===
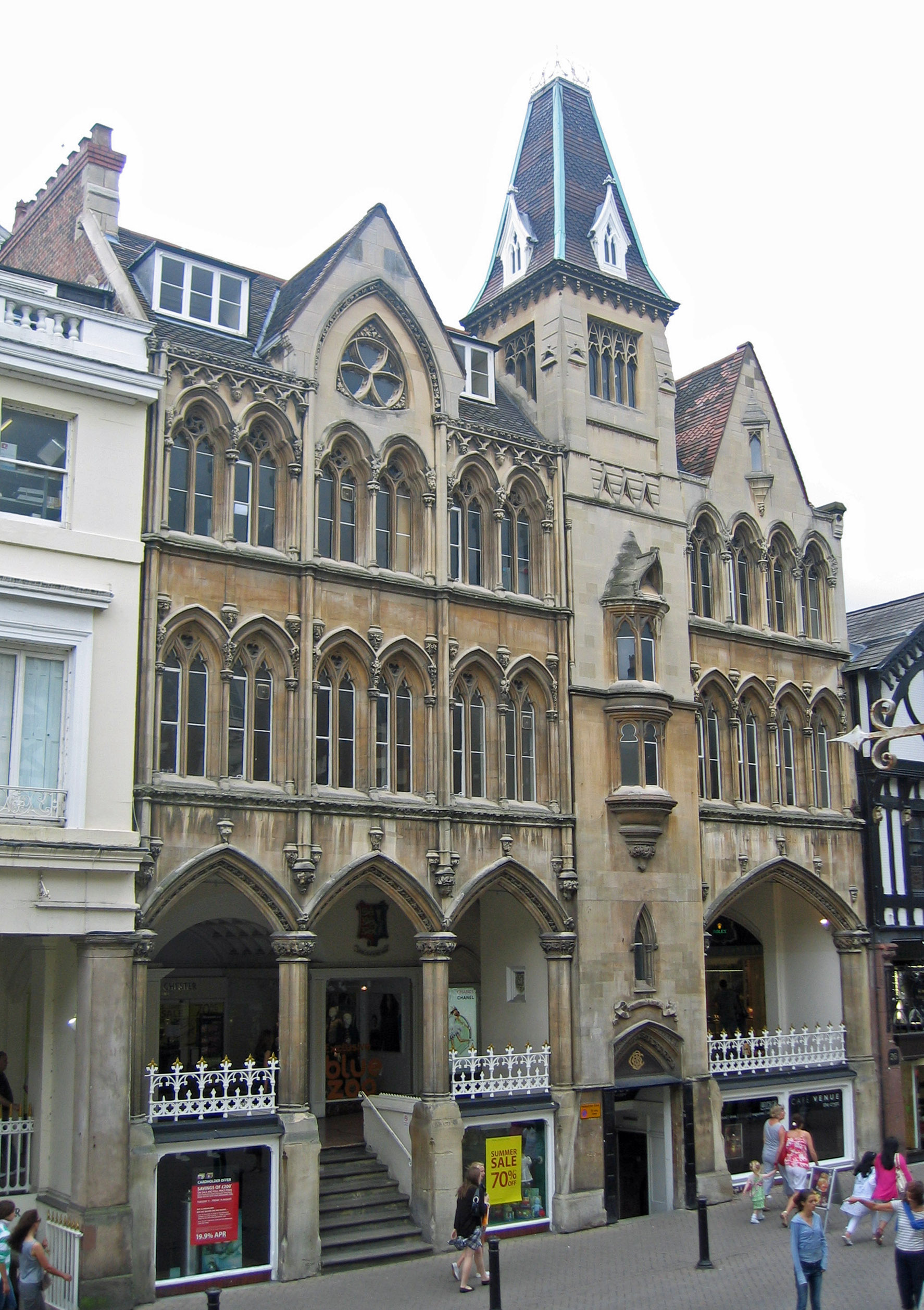
Crypt Chambers in Chester houses part of the Browns of Chester store and is a Grade I listed building.

The business was incorporated as Debenhams Limited in 1905. A new headquarters building, which was designed by William Wallace and James Glen Sivewright Gibson and built by Trollope & Colls, was completed in Wigmore Street in 1908. Debenhams at this time did not operate any other department stores, but did supply to others across the country via its wholesale business. It was because of the debts owed to them through their wholesaling deals that they acquired control over Marshall & Snelgrove at Oxford Street and Harvey Nichols in Knightsbridge both in London in 1919. The business at this time was run by Ernest Debenham and his close friend Frederick Oliver. In 1926, Oliver retired, and upon the advice of the Whitehall Trust, Debenhams Securities was formed to buy Oliver's share in the business, with Ernest Debenham as chair and being joined by Frederick Richmond and Maurice Wright. The business also operated the London booksellers J & E Bumpus.

However, during the mid-1920s, several new investment groups were created and started buying up regional drapers and department stores. Clarence Hatry had created the Drapery Trust in 1925, while Charterhouse Bank's company, Charterhouse Investments Trust (under Sir Arthur Wheeler, 1st Baronet), had created United Drapery Stores in 1927, and Selfridge Provincial Stores was created by James White and Gordon Selfridge in 1926. These were seen to be a threat to Debenhams' wholesale business, as the company would lose sales to these new combined groups. Frederick Richmond and Maurice Wright thought it was too late to start creating a provincial group, so started negotiations with Clarence Hatry in 1927 to purchase the Drapery Trust. By November the deal was agreed for £2,350,000, mostly funded through Hatry's company Austin Friars Trust purchasing £1,600,000 of Debenhams shares.

As part of the deal, Ernest Debenham was forced out of the business, along with his son Peter. In a letter to The Times, Ernest wrote

A month ago I had no intention of retiring from the management of Debenhams Securities. Indeed, I had every reason to hope that the connection of myself and my family with that business would be indefinitely prolonged. When the offer was made to purchase all or any of the ordinary shares in Debenhams Securities, circumstances of no interest to the general investing public compelled me to accept the offer.

The new enlarged company was offered to the public in February 1928, with the release of 2 million preference shares through merchant bank M. Samuel & Co, with the company being first listed on the London Stock Exchange later that year. In 1929, as part of his fraudulent plan to raise the cash for his deal to purchase United Steel, Hatry forged £478,100 of shares in the Drapery Trust, but by September 1929 he had confessed to his crimes. The connection of Clarence Hatry to Debenhams plunged the company into a crisis once his finances started to unravel, in addition to the Drapery Trust dividend collapsing and its export business diving due to the economy. Maurice Wright completed a rewriting of the capital in 1934, and merged the three operations, Debenhams, Debenhams Securities and Drapery Trust, slashing the company's issued capital from £15,100,000 to £6,000,000. Wright would later be made Managing Director, before becoming Chairman in 1948.

During the 1930s and 1940s the company continued to expand, becoming the biggest department store company in the country by 1948, with the stores retaining their original names until a reorganisation in the 1970s. In 1944 the company announced a post-tax profit of £249,605. An example of these acquisitions was the purchase of the Norwich stores of Buntings and Chamberlains in 1949, leading to their controlling four of the city's department stores. During 1957, the company purchased the ladies fashion store, Cresta, from W. Garfield Weston's Howardsgate Holdings. In 1959 the business failed in a takeover of rival department store group Harrods, rivalling United Drapery Stores and eventual winner House of Fraser.

The company closed several branches in 1970, with Birmingham (Marshall & Snelgrove, formerly Warwick House), Manchester (Marshall & Snelgrove in St Annes Place), Sheffield (Marshall & Snelgrove, Leopold Street) and Southsea (Plummers, Palmerston Road) properties being sold by auction. In 1972, United Drapery Stores made an offer to purchase Debenhams, along with interest from Sears plc and Tesco, but were fought off by chairman Sir Anthony Burney. The company entered the superstore revolution by opening two Scan Superstores, which sold an assortment of Debenhams normal products in a supermarket like environment. In 1976 the company acquired Browns of Chester. It remained the only one of the company's UK stores to have retained an individual identity until all stores closed in 2021. The business diversified during the 1970s buying South East based supermarket group Cater Brothers in 1972, after the death of its chairman Leslie Cater. Using the new purchasing power Debenhams modernised its 40 food halls within its stores, branding them Cater's Food Halls, and opened two new Cater superstores. However the business declined in the intense marketplace and in 1979 the chain was sold to Allied Suppliers who converted the Cater stores into their Presto format. Debenham's other experiment into the superstore market, the two Scan Superstores were sold to Tesco in February 1978. Other diversifications included Greens Cameras & High-Fi and New Dimension, a home furniture and furnishing business. The company continued to open new stores, with Mansfield, Stirling and Eltham being opened in 1977. The company at times struggled in the 1970s, with a former chief executive stating it had

too much selling space and too little talent to fill it

The company closed its ladies clothing chain Cresta in 1980, selling 27 of the stores to Irvine Sellar's fashion group, which also purchased the York store which was rebranded as Marshalls by Sellars. This followed on from the £1.7 million sale of Greens Photography and Hifi to Dixons in late 1979. Debenhams was targeted three times during the 1980s by the Animal Liberation Front in protest at the sale of animal furs in stores. Stores in Romford, Luton, and Harrow were fire-bombed by members, the worst attack being on the Luton store. As a result, the company stopped selling clothes with animal furs. It was alleged by Caroline Lucas MP in a debate in Westminster Hall that Bob Lambert, a then undercover police officer, planted the fire bomb that caused £340,000 worth of damage to the Harrow branch of Debenhams in 1987. It is unclear if anything has come of these allegations as of March 2014.

In 1985 the company was acquired by the Burton Group. At the time of the takeover deal, Burtons claimed,

We will end, however, Debenhams' hotch potch of shops-in-shops with conflicting marketing images and the confusing merchandising and floor layouts

Following the closure of the store in Dudley in January 1981 and the Birmingham store in 1983, the company's only store in the West Midlands for the next six years was a town centre store in Walsall. On 4 November 1989, it opened a store at the Merry Hill Shopping Centre in Brierley Hill.

Debenhams entered Ireland as the anchor store at the Jervis Shopping Centre in Dublin in 1996, and then established a second anchor store at Mahon Point Shopping Centre in Cork in 2005.

Debenhams demerged from the Burton Group in January 1998 and was once again listed as a separate company on the London Stock Exchange. It expanded under the leadership of Belinda Earl who was appointed CEO in 2000.

=== 21st century ===
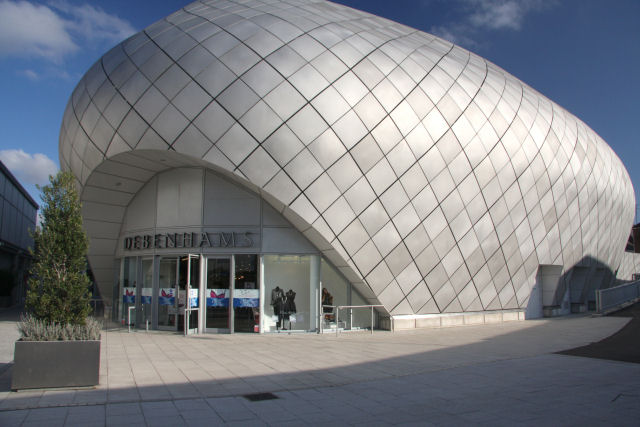
Debenhams in Bury St Edmunds

Debenhams opened its largest British store on 4 September 2003, at the new Bull Ring shopping centre in Birmingham. The new store contained 19,230 sq m and opened 20 years after the company closed its Birmingham city centre store due to declining trade. A private consortium named Baroness Retail Limited, comprising CVC Capital Partners, Texas Pacific Group, Merrill Lynch Global Private Equity and management, acquired the company in November 2003 in a leveraged buyout, for which the consortium only provided £600m of equity and added £1.2bn in debt. According to The Financial Times, the consortium "then extracted more than £1bn via property sale and leaseback agreements", before returning the business to a listing on the London Stock Exchange in 2006.

On 8 August 2006, it was announced that Debenhams would buy the leaseholds of nine of the 11 Roches Stores department stores in Ireland for €29 million. Under the deal, the stores, including those in St. Patrick's Street in Cork and Henry Street in Dublin would be rebranded as Debenhams stores. The Roche family retained the ownership of the stores, and Debenhams became the new tenants.

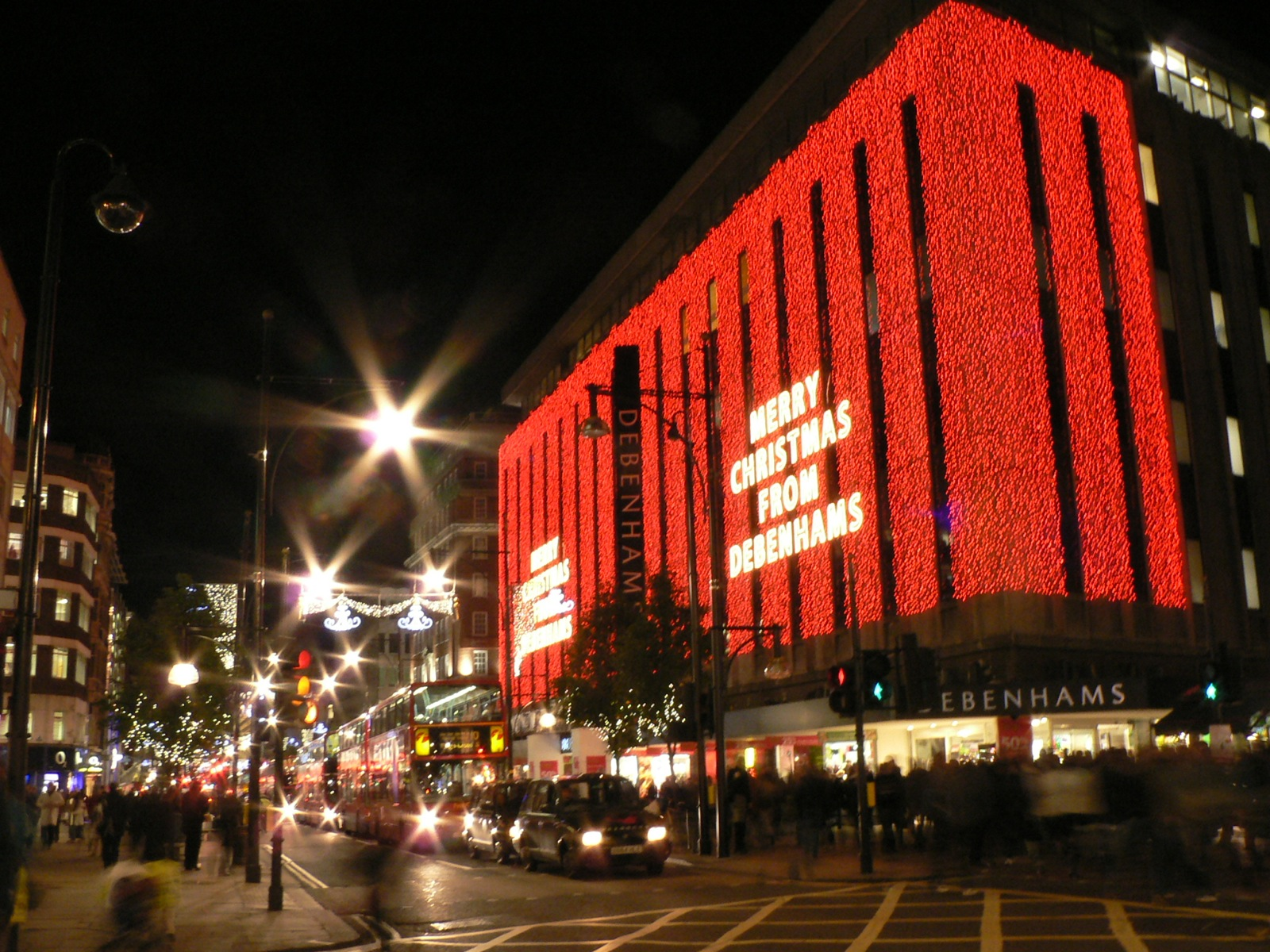
Debenhams' flagship store in Oxford Street, London, England, during 2005 Christmas

The company purchased the brand name and stock of Principles in March 2009 after the business entered administration. Principles operated concessions within 121 Debenhams stores, and was subsequently relaunched by Ben de Lisi as part of the Designers at Debenhams range. In November 2009, Debenhams acquired the Danish department store group Magasin du Nord for £12.3 million. The company operated six stores in Denmark under the Magasin brand.

In July 2010 Debenhams purchased the 115 Faith concessions trading within its stores, after Faith entered administration. In April 2012 the company announced it would be building 14 new stores, and was in negotiations over a further 25 sites in the UK. Debenhams agreed to become the anchor store at the Riverside shopping centre in Shrewsbury. By September 2012, the company announced that like-for-like sales had risen by 3.3% in the six months up to that date.

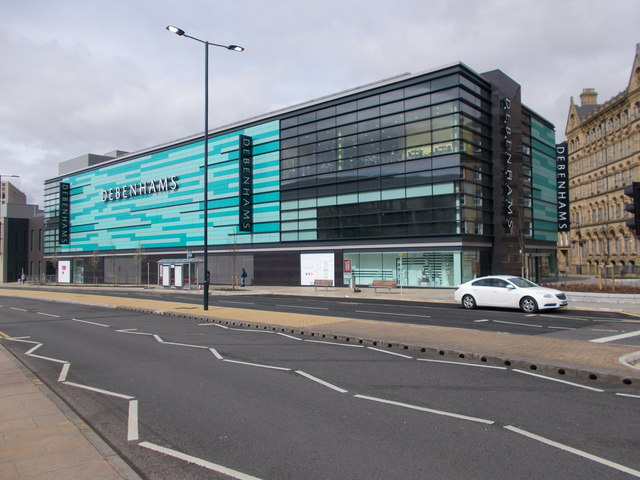
Debenhams, Bradford.

Debenhams moved to a new headquarters in 2013, in Brock Street, London built by British Land. The company leased 174,500 square feet (16,000 m^{2}) of office space from British Land for 25 years. The company began a refurbishment of its flagship store in Oxford Street, London in 2013, which involved the installation of 180,000 aluminium tiles on the exterior of the building that appears to ripple with the wind. An existing floor was also converted to become a trading floor. The total cost of the refurbishment was in the region of £40 million, of which Debenhams contributed £25 million. The owner of the building, British Land, also contributed towards the cost. The refurbishment was due to be completed by February 2014.

The company's trading statement for the 17 weeks up to 28 December 2013 was released on 31 December 2013, and revealed a reduction in pre-tax profit from £115 million to £85 million. On 2 January 2014, the company's chief financial officer Simon Herrick resigned, following criticism of his financial decisions. On 13 January 2014 4.6% of Debenhams shares were bought by Sports Direct, the retailer run by Mike Ashley. The stock market purchase of 56.8 million shares (worth around £46m) was made without the prior knowledge of the Debenhams board. Sports Direct stated at the time it intended to be a supportive share holder. The Debenhams board responded by stating they were open-minded with regard to exploring operational opportunities to improve its performance. Sports Direct sold its shares on 16 January 2014, although they took out an option to buy further shares up to a total of 6.6%. In August 2017, it emerged that Ashley had secured 21% of the shares which gave him over 10% of voting rights in the company.

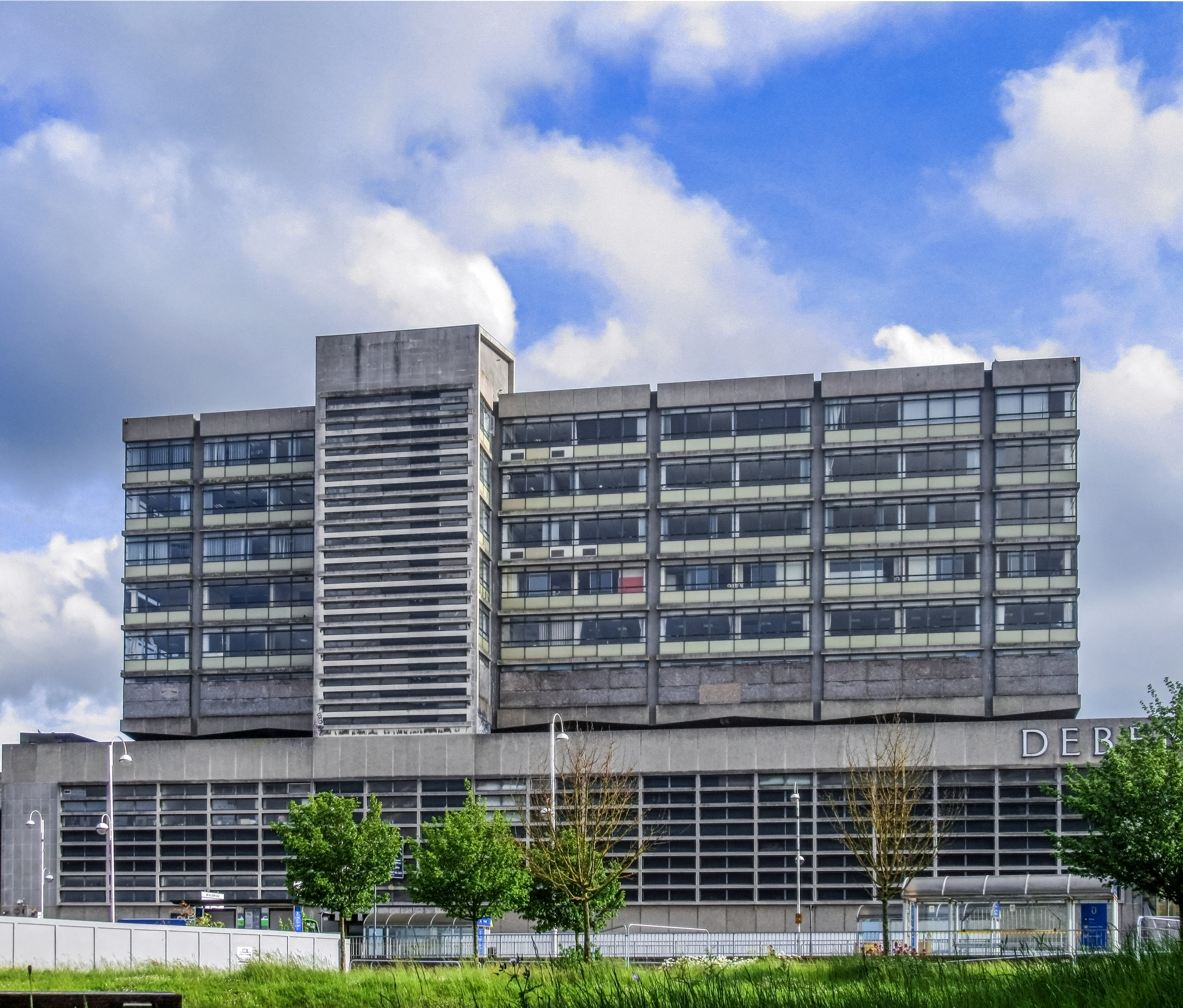
Debenhams, Swindon

During 2017 Debenhams opened two new stores, one in Stevenage and one in Wolverhampton. The 80,000 sq ft Stevenage store was opened on 24 August 2017 at Roaring Meg Retail and Leisure Park by celebrity fashion designer Julien Macdonald and local hero Jean Robinson, who had won a competition for the privilege. The store was the first to be designed under the vision of CEO Sergio Bucher, with a new layout and format with the emphasis on encouraging people to stay longer. The second store to open during 2017 was the new 93,000 sq ft store at Wolverhampton's Mander Centre. The store was opened on 12 October 2017 as part of the centre's £35 million refurbishments, it was also Debenhams' first store in Wolverhampton. It was only the second to feature the new layout previously only seen in the Stevenage store, and only the second to feature the company's new deli-restaurant format Loaf & Bloom, only previously seen at Milton Keynes.

In February 2018, the company announced a reduction of up to 320 store management roles across the business by the end of March. Sports Direct increased its holding in the company to 29.7% on 2 March, just below the level whereby it would be required to submit a formal takeover approach.

==== Financial difficulties ====
After media speculation about Debenhams' survival, in 2018 the company announced the largest loss in its history, a pre-tax loss of £491 million, and the closure of up to 50 stores with the potential loss of 4,000 jobs.

On 9 April 2019, the company announced that they had gone into pre-pack administration.

On 26 April 2019, the company announced that in addition to rent reductions on all except 39 stores, 22 stores would close after Christmas 2019. This included the recently opened Wolverhampton store plus Altrincham, Ashford, Birmingham Fort, Canterbury, Chatham, Eastbourne, Folkestone, Great Yarmouth, Guildford, Kirkcaldy, Orpington, Slough, Southport, Southsea, Staines, Stockton-on-Tees, Walton-on-Thames, Wandsworth, Welwyn Garden City, Wimbledon and Witney.

On 6 April 2020, Debenhams confirmed it had filed a notice of intent to appoint administrators. CEO Stefaan Vansteenkiste said it was due to "unprecedented" circumstances caused by the COVID-19 lockdown and was to "protect [the] business, ... employees, and other important stakeholders". On 9 April 2020, the company went into administration.

On 9 April 2020, Debenhams confirmed it planned to close 11 stores in Ireland with immediate effect.

In April 2020, Debenhams closed seven UK stores and was set to close five more when Coronavirus restrictions were lifted. This included the Croydon store that anchored the Centrale shopping mall (previously the Drummond Centre) that Debenhams had acquired when they took over the Kennards chain of stores, bringing to a close a trading period of more than 150 years from that site.

In July 2020, Debenhams was set to abandon its property in Princes Street in Edinburgh, which it leased from Legal & General, in order to make room for a £50m hotel. In the same month, Debenhams put itself up for sale to prevent it going into liquidation, hoping to find a buyer by September. In August 2020, the company announced it was cutting 2,500 job positions as a result of the economic effects of the pandemic. The job cuts affected store management positions; sales managers, visual merchandise managers, and selling support managers were set to be axed. According to the company, "The trading environment is clearly a long way from returning to normal. Such difficult decisions are being taken by many retailers right now, and we will continue to take all necessary steps to give Debenhams every chance of a viable future." In September 2020, Debenhams put its seven store Danish chain, Magasin du Nord, up for sale. Magasin du Nord was later sold to German department store Peek & Cloppenburg for £120 million.

On 1 December 2020, after the collapse of talks with Arcadia (which went into administration the previous day) and JD Sports over a potential rescue, Debenhams announced it was going into liquidation, putting 12,000 jobs in 124 UK stores at risk unless the administrators could find buyers for all or parts of the business. With the company in administration and on the verge of liquidation, on 6 December 2020, Mike Ashley's Frasers Group was reported to be in talks to acquire Debenhams, though it was later reported that Ashley was mainly interested in using empty Debenhams stores to expand his other chains, including House of Fraser, Sports Direct and Flannels; taking 'vacant possession' would avoid redundancy costs for existing staff.

On 13 January 2021, Debenhams announced it would permanently shut six stores in England due to the COVID-19 lockdown. They included the flagship Oxford Street store in London, plus those in Worcester, Weymouth, Staines, Harrogate and Portsmouth; the move involved 320 job losses.

On 25 January 2021, it was announced that Boohoo had bought the Debenhams brand and website for £55m, but did not retain any of the remaining 118 stores, meaning the loss of up to 12,000 jobs. Boohoo relaunched the website as Debenhams.com in April that year. On 5 May 2021, the liquidator announced that all remaining UK stores would close on 15 May 2021, marking the end of Debenhams as a department store retailer in the UK after 243 years. Despite the closure in the UK, Debenhams stores in Middle East countries continued to operate for a few years. However, Debenhams closed its stores in Middle East countries in 2025.

== Products and services ==
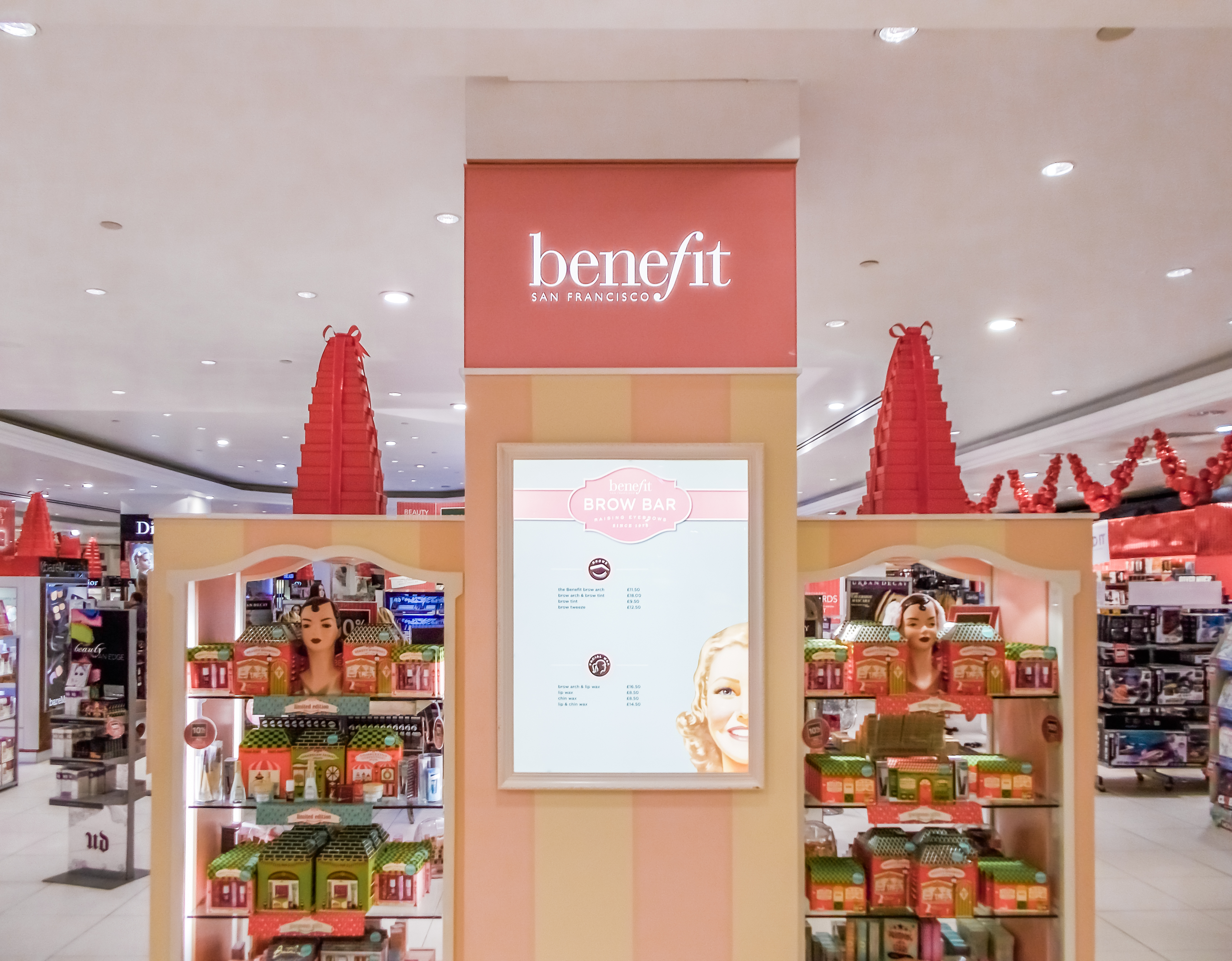
Benefit stand in the Sutton, London branch

In 1993 the company introduced the 'Designers at Debenhams' brand, the creation of then CEO Belinda Earl, Ben de Lisi and Spencer Hawken. The idea introduced designer names and brands such as Jasper Conran, John Rocha, Butterfly by Matthew Williamson, H! by Henry Holland, Star by Julien Macdonald, Frost French, Janet Reger, Ted Baker, St George by Duffer, Jeff Banks, and Ben de Lisi. The company also started selling goods under a number of brand names that it owned. In 2010, Debenhams announced the launch of four new designer names to its fashion range: Jonathan Saunders, Preen, Jonathan Kelsey, and Roksanda Ilincic.

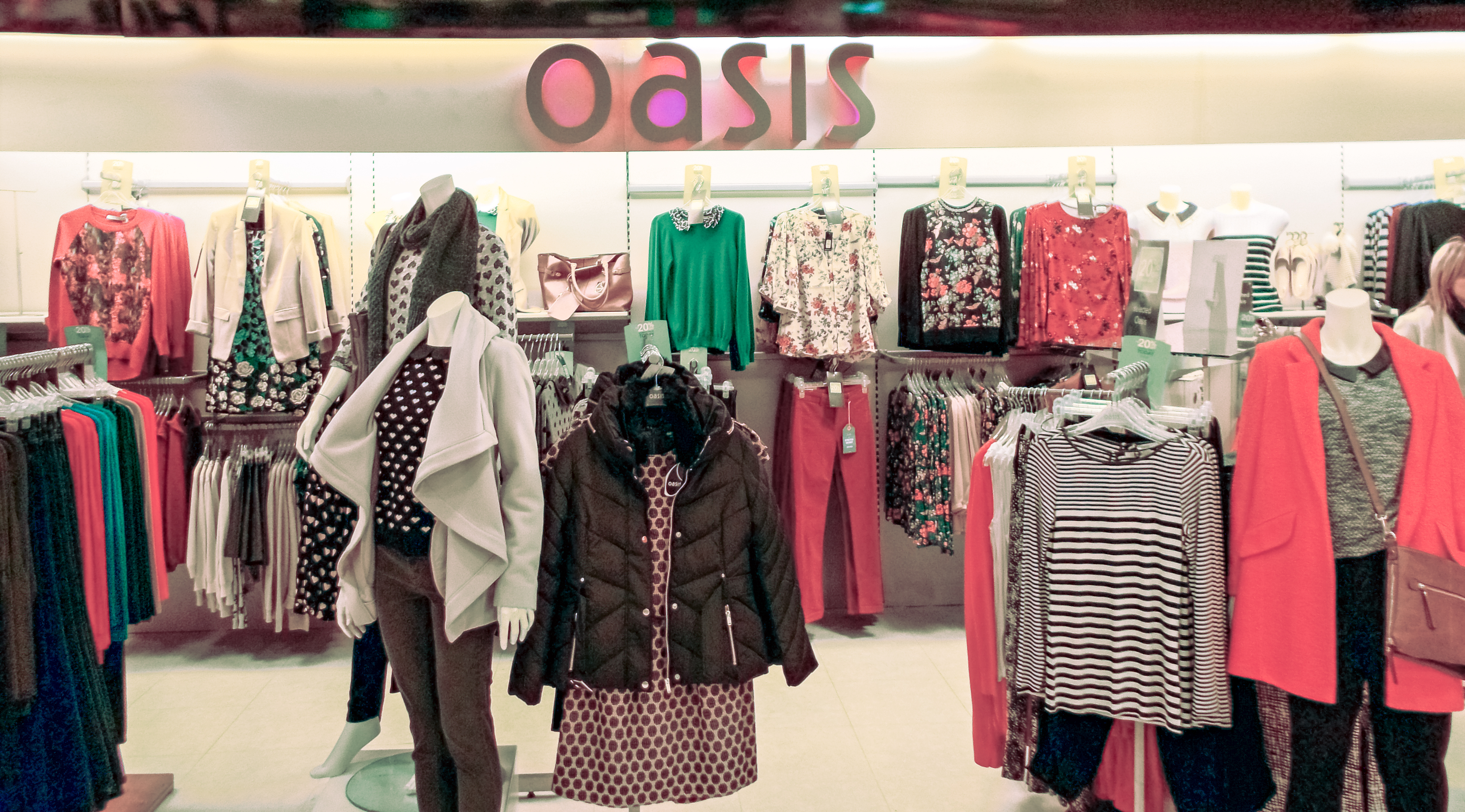
Oasis concession in the Sutton, London branch

Stores also contained concessions whereby other retailers could trade. Brands in stores include Oasis, Coast, Phase Eight and Warehouse. In June 2014, the company announced a trial of Sports Direct concessions in its Harrow and Southsea stores, which if successful would be expanded to other stores. This followed the purchase of a stake in Debenhams by Mike Ashley, the owner of Sports Direct, in January 2014. Later that year, Debenhams also launched trials of Costa Coffee and Mothercare concessions within stores.

In October 2016, the company announced it would begin to focus less on clothing and more on food, beauty products and gifts. It also hired the former lighting buying team of collapsed rival BHS to begin introducing new lighting departments in stores. Debenhams followed this in December 2016 with a plan to discontinue its Betty Jackson Black ladies fashion brand, and significantly reduce its Jeff Banks menswear range in favour of expanding the Hammond & Co. brand.

The company operated retail websites in the UK and Ireland, as well as a mobile-enabled website and mobile apps that allowed customers to shop the online range and scan product barcodes in store.

Debenhams provided store card and credit card services, operated by NewDay. Insurance products were also provided under the Debenhams brand by other financial companies. Debenhams also operated bureaux de change in selected stores. The company ran a loyalty card programme, branded the Debenhams Beauty Club, where customers could collect points with the purchase of health and beauty products.

== Former stores and franchises ==
=== United Kingdom, Denmark and Ireland ===
In 1956, Debenhams owned or controlled through its subsidiary, the Drapery Trust, the following businesses, which it rated in different classes:

High class stores

- Barrance & Ford, Brighton
- Bradleys, Chepstow Place, London
- Debenham & Freebody, Wigmore Street, London
- Harvey Nichols & Co, Knightsbridge and Bournemouth
- Marshall & Snelgrove, Oxford Street, Birmingham, Bradford, Harrogate, Leeds, Leicester, Manchester, Norwich, Scarborough, Sheffield, Southport and York
- Stanley, Birmingham
- Williams & Hopkins, Bournemouth
- Woolland Brothers, Knightsbridge

Medium class stores

- Affleck & Brown, Manchester
- Adnitt Brothers, Northampton
- William Baker & Co, Oxford
- V H Bennett, Weymouth
- Bobby & Co., Margate, Bournemouth, Cliftonville, Eastbourne, Exeter, Folkestone, Leamington Spa, Torquay and Worcester
- Buntings, Norwich
- Dust & Co, Tunbridge Wells
- Elliston & Cavell, Oxford
- Gardiner & Co, Ipswich
- Garland & Sons, Norwich
- Griffin & Spalding, Nottingham
- Handleys, Southsea
- Haymans, Totnes
- William Hill, Hove
- John K Hubbard, Worthing
- C Morrish & Son, Lewes
- Pendlebury & Co, Wigan
- Plummer Roddis, Hastings, Andover, Bath, Boscombe, Bournemouth, Brighton, Eastbourne, Folkestone, Southampton, Southsea, Weymouth, Winchester and Yeovil
- E P Rose & Son, Bedford
- Swan & Edgar, Piccadilly Circus
- Thornton-Varley, Hull
- Wellsteeds, Reading

Popular class stores

- Arnolds, Great Yarmouth
- Bon Marche, Gloucester
- Bon Marche (part of Edwin Jones), Poole and Weymouth
- Clinton Restaurants, Weymouth
- Curl Brothers, Norwich
- Dawson Brothers, Hoxton
- Z Dudley, Dalston
- James G. Farmer, Nottingham
- Footman Pretty & Co, Ipswich
- Jermyn & Sons, King's Lynn
- Jones & Co, Bristol
- Edwin Jones & Co, Southampton and Bournemouth
- Kennards, Croydon and Redhill
- Kennards, Staines
- Lefevre, Gillingham
- William Lefevre, Canterbury
- Nicholsons, Bromley
- Pauldens, Manchester and Newcastle under Lyme
- E Pretty & Co, Bury St Edmunds
- Sherriff & Ward, Winchester
- J C Smiths, Nuneaton, Bedworth and Stratford upon Avon
- Sopers, Harrow
- Spooner & Co, Plymouth
- Staddons, Plaistow
- Style & Gerrish, Salisbury

In addition, the business ran several wholesale businesses including, amongst others Debenhams Wholesale, Chamberlins, DLMS and St Aldate Warehouse.

In 1979, it was reported that Debenhams operated 70 department stores in England, 2 in Wales and 1 in Scotland, though the following still operated under their original names:

- Swan & Edgar, London
- Harvey Nichols, London
- Browns, Chester
- Corders, Ipswich
- Garlands, Norwich
- Plummers, Southampton
- Hills, Hove

The company also operated 33 Cresta Fashion stores, 22 Caters Supermarkets, 109 Lotus shoeshops, toy and sports retailer Hamleys, Greens Cameras & Hifi and News Dimension, a home furniture and furnishings company.

As of December 2020, the company owned and operated 124 stores in the United Kingdom, and 7 under the Magasin du Nord brand in Denmark. Debenhams occupied the most sites of any of the traditional department store groups in the UK. The majority of the original trading names of the stores, in each of their respective locations, were replaced with the "Debenhams" name during the 1970s. All the department stores in the group traded as "Debenhams" (although the store in Chester was still dual-signed as Debenhams and Browns of Chester).

In April 2020, stores operated in Ireland by Debenhams Ireland ceased trading with the loss of nearly 2,000 jobs.

=== International franchises ===
==== Middle East (defunct) ====
Debenhams only operates two stores in Iran. The Alshaya Group previously held the licence to Debenhams across the Middle East and operated these stores between 1997 and 2025.

The first Debenhams store in the Middle East opened in 1997 in Bahrain.

Debenhams entered Iran in 2009 with a Tehran store, the stores are operated in a franchise partnership with Lilian Mode. There were five stores across the country by 2015.

The brand exited Egypt in 2024.

Debenhams exited Saudi Arabia in 2025 closing its stores at Riyadh Park (closed March) and Granada Mall (closed April). The Avenues Mall (Phase 4) store in Kuwait also closed the same year.

The Dubai Mall and Mirdiff City Centre stores, including their Debenhams Cosmetics stores, were closed in June 2025.

On 26 November 2025, Debenhams (Alshaya Group operations) announced on Instagram that it would be exiting the Middle East, the post was then taken down and a Debenhams spokesperson stated " the business is assessing ways to serve its Middle East customers going forward."

==== Southeast Asia (defunct) ====
Debenhams opened in Malaysia in 2003 first at Berjaya Times Square in Kuala Lumpur. In 2006 Debenhams ceased trading in Malaysia but returned in 2008 after finding a new master franchiser. The stores were still operating in 2019 at The Curve and Gurney Paagon but later closed.

The first store in the Philippines opened in 2005. The brand was previously operated by the SSI Group and were located at Shangri-la Plaza, Abreeza, and a shop-in-shop inside Rustan's Glorietta 3.

In partnership with Mitra Adiperkasa, Debenhams operated in Indonesia, opening a store at Plaza Indonesia in 2003. They eventually opened their second store at Supermal Karawaci, a flagship store at Senayan City in 2006, followed by a store at Lippo Mall Kemang opened in 2012, which closed later. On 31 December 2017, their flagship store at Senayan City was closed and with this, the brand left Indonesia.

==== Europe (defunct) ====
In 2003, Ermes department stores of the Shacolas group brought Debenhams to Cyprus under a franchising system, in what was previously Woolworth. In total there were nine Debenhams stores. In 2020, Ermes rebranded the 4 remaining stores (one in every major city) as Era department stores which are still operational.

In 2006 a store opened in Russia on Krasnaya Presnya Street but in 2007 the store closed, Debenhams re-entered the Russian market in 2012 with a store opened in Russia at MEGA Belaya Dacha. This store closed down in 2016, with the brand leaving the country entirely in 2017.

In 2010 they entered Malta, the two stores closed in 2021.

A store opened at Bulgaria Mall in Sofia in 2012 and was the 71st international store.

Debenham's opened a store in the European part of Turkey in the Mall of Istanbul in 2014 and in the Istanbul Cevahir mall. Both closed in 2017.

==== Elsewhere (defunct) ====
Another store opened in Pakistan in the same year and the last location at Dolmen Mall Clifton in Karachi closed in September 2020 and Debenhams left the country.

In 2017 a store opened in Australia at Melbourne's 260 Collins, the store was closed in January 2020.
