= Swan & Edgar, Marylebone =

Former pub in Marylebone, London

Coordinates: 51°31′26″N 0°09′43″W

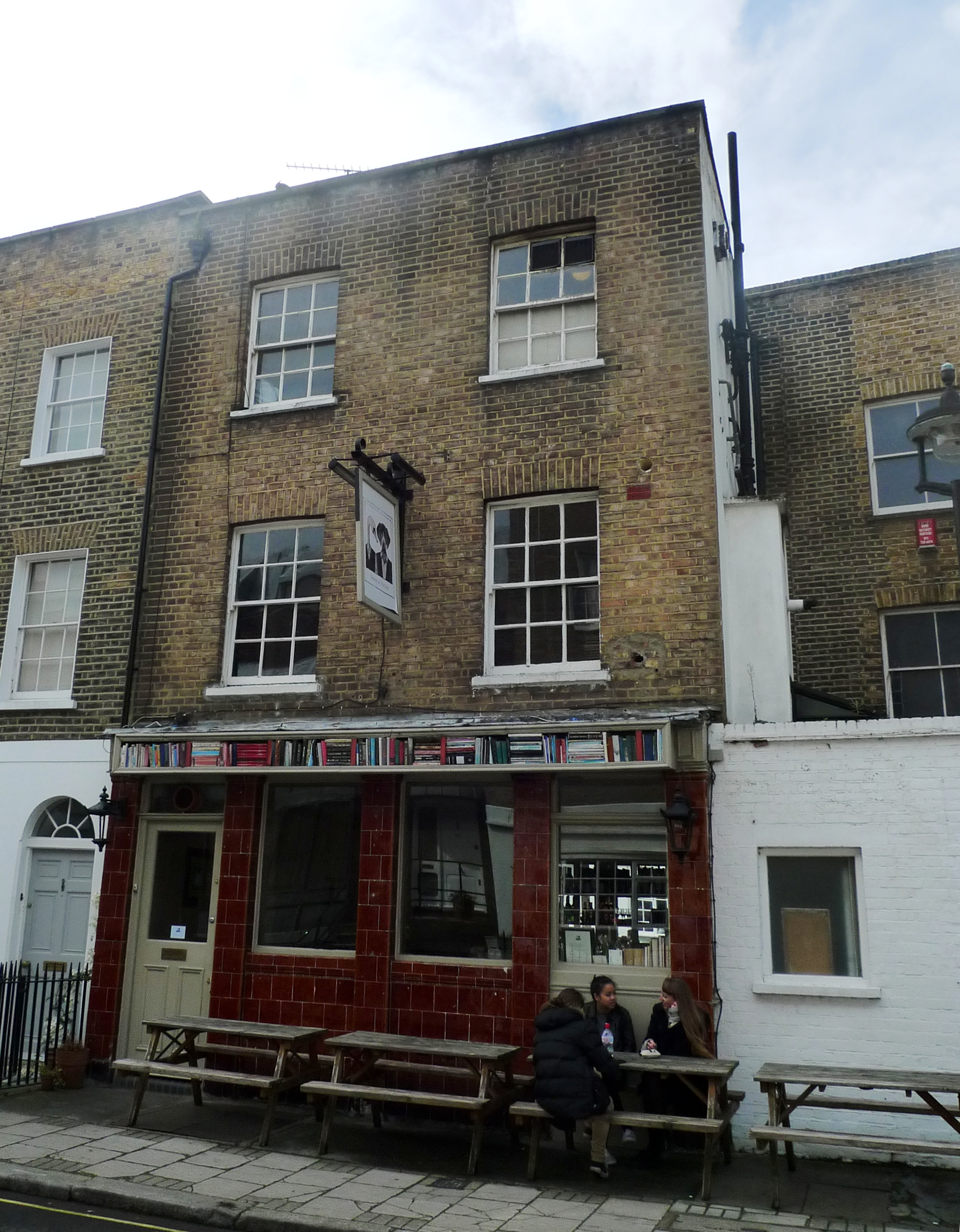
The Swan & Edgar pub, 2012

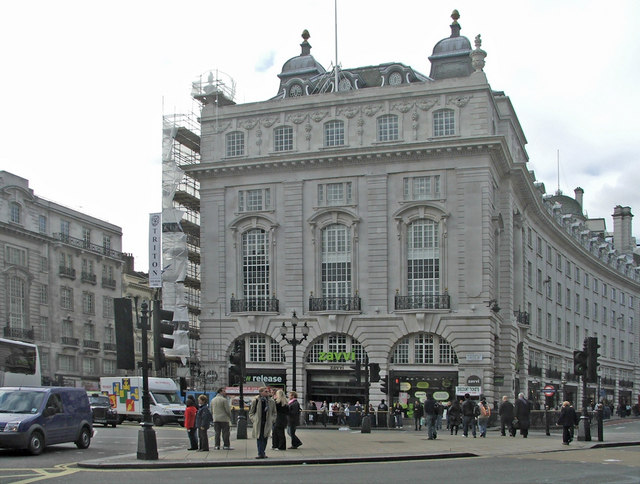
The Swan & Edgar building, Piccadilly Circus

The Swan & Edgar was (until 2013) a public house at 43 Linhope Street, Marylebone, owned by Bourne and Hollingsworth Group, notable for its claim to be the smallest pub in London.

== History ==
It was originally called "The Feathers", but was renamed after Swan & Edgar, a former department store at Piccadilly Circus, about two miles away. It was a pub from 1899 until it closed in 2013. It was known for its unusual interior, having varnished books as wall cover and Scrabble tiles as bathroom flooring. In July 2013, the freehold and the pub were offered for sale at a guide price of £650,000. The property attracted 90 viewings and 28 offers, and its estimated selling price was about £900,000. In April 2014, Westminster Council received an application from the developers, seeking permission for a change of use into residential property. The application was refused in 2015.

== Description ==
According to a description of the interior by the Evening Standard, "The bar in the diminutive ground floor is made from books stuck together into a curved wall and varnished. A plank of wood seals the top." In keeping with the book theme, the pub hosted book signings, poetry readings, quizzes and society meetings, often using the upstairs room.

== Campaign ==
A campaign, "Save The Linhope Street Local", was formed by local people eager to stop the redevelopment and have the pub designated as an Asset of Community Value. Local residents demonstrated on 7 April 2014, in support for this campaign. The Campaign for Real Ale's John Cryne said that the conversion of pubs is often into just single residences, and that this is what is proposed for the Swan & Edgar, but it does not help to solve London’s housing problems. "They are for millionaires ... Few, if any, public houses in wealthy London districts are economically unviable."
