= Bourne & Hollingsworth =

Former department store in London

Coordinates: 51°30′57.98″N 0°8′10.6″W

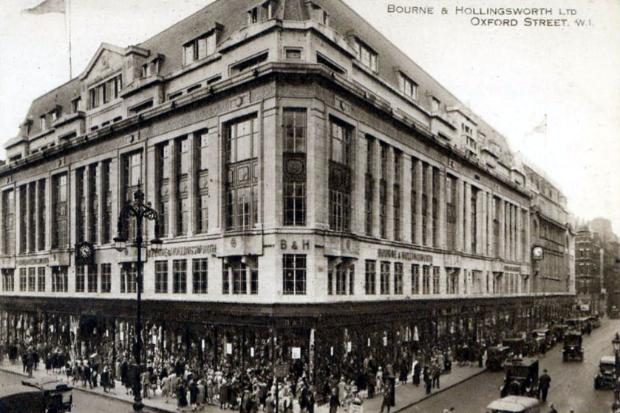
Photograph of Bourne & Hollingsworth, taken in the early 1920s

Bourne & Hollingsworth, known also in its latter days as Bournes was a large department store on the corner of Oxford Street and Berners Street. It was named after its founders, Walter William Bourne and Howard E Hollingsworth, brothers in law, who started the store in Westbourne Grove as a drapery store in 1894. The store then moved to the Oxford Street site (pictured) in 1902 (built in 1894) due to competition with Whiteleys, and by 1928 the store had been remodelled (by Slater & Moberly) in the Art Deco style.

Bourne & Hollingsworth became known for selling quality goods and for looking after their staff, providing accommodation at Warwickshire House on Gower Street for up to 600 female workers. Like much of Oxford Street, the store suffered bomb damage in 1940, however today much of the art deco façade still survives.

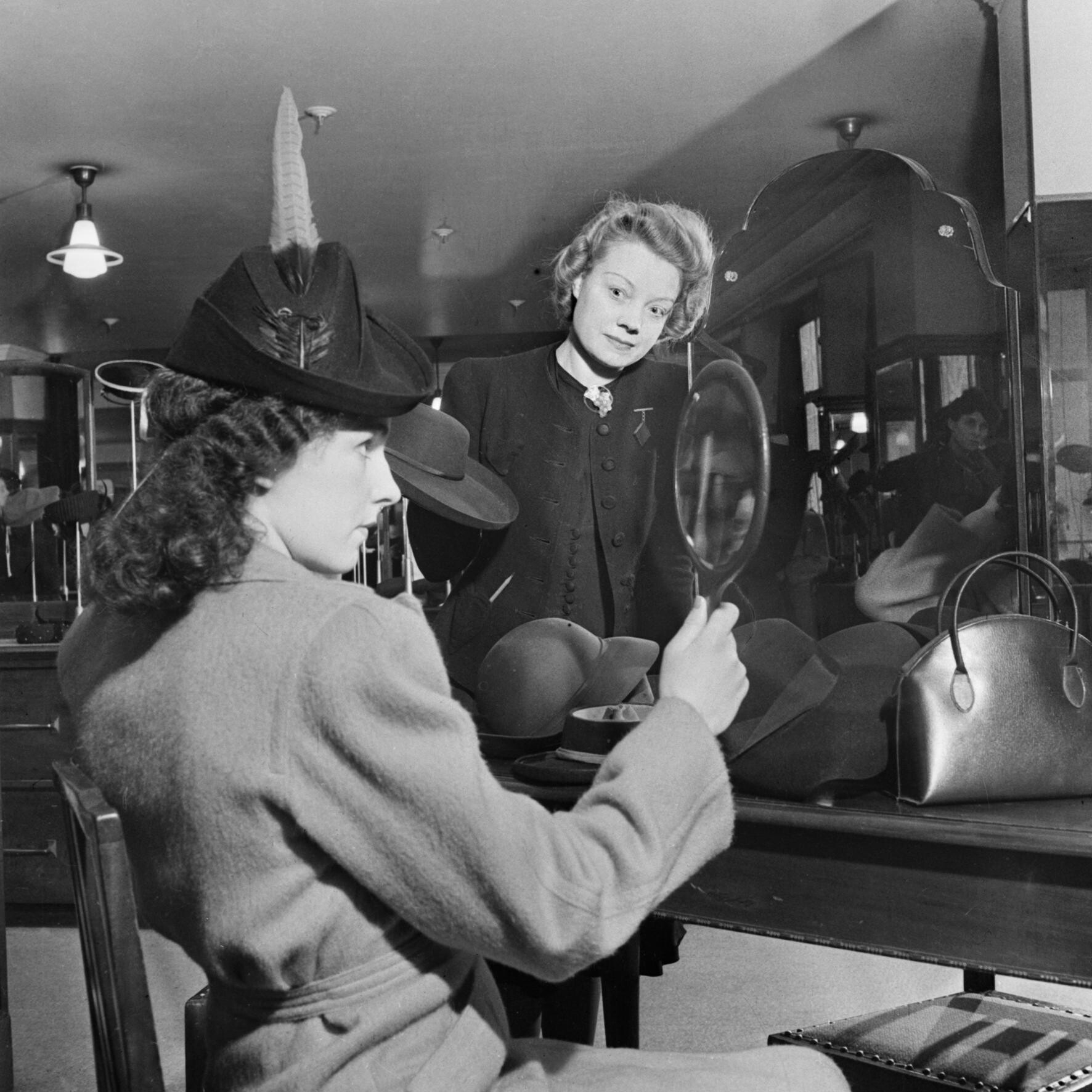
A customer tries on a new hat in the millinery department of Bourne & Hollingsworth in 1942

The 1954 comedy-drama film The Crowded Day, directed by John Guillermin, was partially shot inside Bourne & Hollingsworth to provide an authentic setting of a department store, which could not easily be achieved in a studio. The store's exterior was also used for some outside location shots, including the background of the film's opening title credit.

The business expanded opening a further store in Southampton in 1959, which later adopted the name Bournes after it was sold in 1979.

The store finally closed its doors in 1983.

The building was known as The Plaza Oxford Street (opened 1986 closed 2016), but was at one time the planned site for Richard Branson's Virgin Megastore.

In September 2018 the building reopened as the new flagship store of fashion and homewares retailer Next.

The name survives with Bourne & Hollingsworth Group as a basement bar in nearby Rathbone Place, named after the department store as the mother of the bar's owner worked there.
