= Verney L. Danvers =

British graphic designer and artist (1895–1973)

Verney Lionel Danby Danvers (14 June 1895 – 1 December 1973) was a British graphic designer and commercial artist, best known for the design of posters for London Transport, Shell-Mex & BP, and railway companies such as the London & North Eastern Railway, Southern Railway and British Railways.

Danvers was born in Lisbon, Portugal in 1895 where his father was an electrical engineer working as an agent for the Edison Gower-Bell Company. The family left Portugal for England in 1902. Danvers studied at Hornsey College of Art in 1911. By 1920, he had become a commercial artist by then producing posters for a variety of railway and tram companies and for others, such as Shell and the fashion house Bobby & Co. His book Training in Commercial Art was published by Pitmans in 1928. Danvers ran The Court School of Art for a while but this was wound up, by notice in the London Gazette in 1923.

Danvers died in 1973 in Hampstead, north London, aged 78.

Copies of his work are held by the London Transport Museum, the Art Institute of Chicago, the Museum of Modern Art, and the Library of Congress.
