= Buntings (department store) =

Former department store in Norwich, England

Buntings Ltd
- Company type: Private company
- Industry: Retail
- Genre: Department store
- Founded: 1860
- Defunct: 1970s?
- Fate: Bought by Debenhams
- Headquarters: Norwich
- Key people: Arthur Bunting

Buntings was a large department store in Norwich, England, that became part of the Debenhams group.

== History ==
Arthur Bunting started out in 1860 in partnership with the three Curl Brothers in setting up a drapery on the corner of St Stephens Street and Rampant Horse Street. The partnership did not last and before the end of 1860, the Curl Brothers had set up shop on the opposite side of Rampant Horse Street.

Bunting's business grew, even though there was competition from around 90 drapery businesses in Norwich. By 1866 Arthur Bunting & Co was incorporated.

In 1912 work was completed on a new store on the corner of St Stephens Street and Rampant Horse Street, which was designed by architect A.F.Scott and built with an advanced reinforced concrete structure. The store had four floors. In 1926 Buntings were advertising as "The Store for All", and had an orchestral trio playing between 12pm and 6pm. By 1927, Buntings was under the control of fellow Norwich department store, Chamberlins, with both Charles and John Bunting sitting on the boards of both companies.

In 1942, German bombs hit the buildings of Buntings, Curl Brothers and Woolworths. The Woolworths and Curl Brothers buildings were completely destroyed, however Buntings was patched up and used as a NAAFI Service club.

Buntings, like many businesses, were relocated within the city, moving to a site on London Street next door to Garlands. In 1949, Buntings was purchased by Debenhams, with them now controlling four of the city's department stores. Their former site was refurbished after the war and became home to Marks & Spencer in 1950. The frontage of the old Buntings building is still visible today (excluding the fourth floor and the cupola, which were not rebuilt) and is on Norwich City Council's list of Local Listed Buildings.

Buntings' new site at London Street however had a similar fate: in the 1970s a fire at the Garland store next door destroyed both firms.
