= Kennards =

Former British department store chain

Coordinates: 51.3744°N 0.1007°W

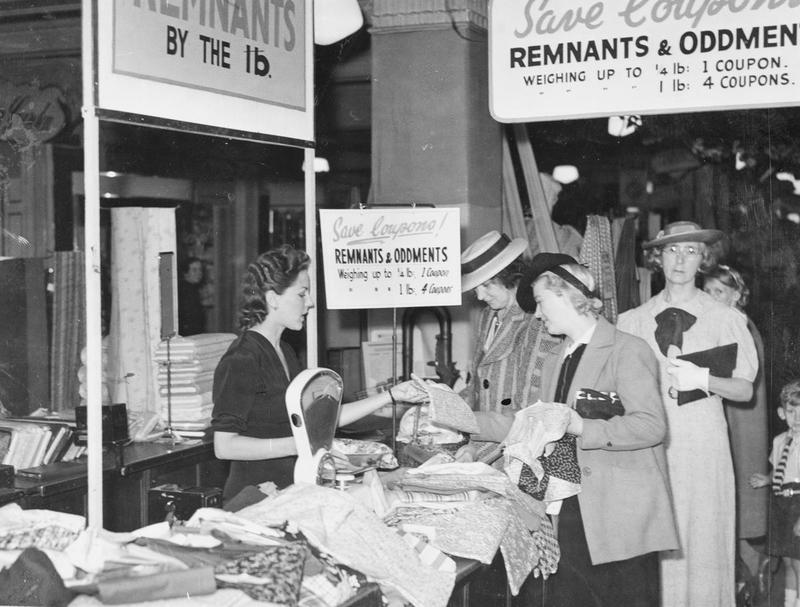
Remnants and oddments of material being sold by the pound at Kennard's store during the Second World War

Kennards was a small department store chain that was started in 1853, founded on the principle of selling reliable goods at low profit margins. Its main Croydon branch was notable for the full-length windows which ran the length of the store. The shop was bought out by Debenhams, through its subsidiary the Drapery Trust in 1928 but not rebranded until 1973. The site was later obtained for development for the new Drummond Centre in the 1980s and the original store was demolished. The new store was sited on some of the original footprint and anchored the Drummond Centre, which was later expanded and renamed Centrale. This store continued to anchor the centre until Debenhams announced its closure in 2020.

== History ==
Kennards was started in 1853 by William Kennard for £100 in the North End of Croydon. The store within a year of opening had served 8,000 customers, which was attributed to the new railway stations that had opened in the area. Allders and Grants of Croydon were the competition.

In 1887, William Kennard died and the business was renamed Kennard Brothers and managed by his son's William & Arthur. At the start of the 20th Century the store expanded, taking over local rival Messrs Buckworth, and opening a second branch in Staines, which brought with it a new rival in Johnson & Clarks which was directly opposite.

Two of the unique selling points of the store was the use of full-length windows running the length of the store, a unique feature at the time, and an arcade (added during the 1930s) inside the store that linked different departments and showcased goods from around the world.

In the 1920s the business grew again, with motor vans replacing the horse drawn delivery carts, and the store being rebuilt with a new entrance and a second floor being added. In 1928 a third floor was added. In 1928, Kennards was purchased by the Drapery Trust around the time that Debenhams had acquired Drapery Trust.

The store kept with the founders principle for selling reliable goods at very low profit margins, which along with aiming its goods at women meant that the store was popular with working class women.

The store was famous for many publicity stunts. However, after the war the business declined, and in 1973 it was rebranded as Debenhams. The original Kennards store in Croydon was knocked down and replaced by a new Debenham store. The closure of this store was announced in 2020, bringing to the end of a period of more than a century and a half of trading from the site as either Kennards or its direct successor while Debenhams are still located in the old Staines store.

== Publicity ==
Kennards were one of the first UK business to use publicity to sell its goods. In the 1920s Kennards introduced Pony rides for children in store, which continued to run until 1966.

The success of this was followed by opening of a small zoo. This originally hosted some monkeys, a camel, a peacock, some birds and other small animals. This attracted many children with their parents, so they decided to expand the zoo further with more exotic animals. In 1930 two lions were introduced, along with a Hyena and a porcupine. Later these were joined by a temporary exhibition of cheetahs. During the mid thirties to bring even more publicity to the store the cheetahs were displayed in the store's restaurant. The zoo closed when the building was refurbished.

The store was also famous for its Christmas grotto. A big procession through the town followed by the opening of the grotto with a big gold key took place. The grotto had a big display with Father Christmas workshop with real elves on display. One year Kennards claimed to have the largest Father Christmas in the world, 46 stone.
