= Tyrrell & Green =

Former department store in Southampton, United Kingdom

Tyrrell & Green was a department store located in Southampton, England before being rebranded as part of John Lewis Partnership.

== Early history ==
In 1897 Reginald Tyrrell and William Green joined forces and opened a shop which was described as a drapers, milliners, ladies and children's outfitters. The store was successful and a year later they moved to Above Bar street to a site occupying four houses. Reginald Tyrrell had already been involved with a business opposite the new store, Plummer, Roddis and Tyrrell, a partnership he created with the merger of his Bournemouth business with the Southampton and Hastings business of Messrs Plummer & Roddis, which he left in 1898.

In 1920 Reginald Tyrrell left the company, leaving it in the hands of William Green and his wife. By this time the business occupied nine houses and had been incorporated with a capital of £142,500. However, in 1930 the Greens sold the business to Barkers of Mile End Road, London (owners of Wickhams) because of retirement. This however did not last long: within a year the Greens had returned to the business as they were disgusted at the low quality of goods being sold by the new owners. However, they did sell the business again in 1934 to the John Lewis Partnership. The store continued to be operated under the Tyrrell & Green name by John Lewis.

== Under John Lewis ==
On 30 November 1940, the store was destroyed by German bombs. A new smaller store was opened in Winchester to continue trading within a week of the bombing, but two months later in 1941 a temporary store was opened on Above Bar Street in Southampton. The Winchester store was kept open with a further five shops added in the town, until 1955 when the store closed. In Southampton the business was spread across the city in several stores in Above Bar, Bargate and the High Street. In 1955 the store started to move into its new premises at 138-152 Above Bar Street with the first section of the store being completed. The rest of the business moved into the other half of the completed building in 1956.

In 1957, the business turnover recorded £100,000 for the first time and the business continued to operate successfully as a branch of John Lewis. The only major changes were the closure of the hairdressers in 1989, and the opening of a gift shop in another unit on Above Bar Street in 1992 and several refurbishments. In 1996 however the John Lewis Partnership announced that the store would be relocating to the yet to be built Westquay Shopping Centre, and announced that the business at the new store would trade under John Lewis. The Tyrrell and Green store finally closed its doors on Saturday 23 September 2000.

The original building was due to be demolished and redeveloped into an Arts centre to be opened in 2008, but the economic downturn means that the building has only been partly demolished.
