= Bourne & Hollingsworth Group =

Bourne and Hollingsworth Group
- Company type: Private
- Industry: Events & Entertainment
- Headquarters: London, United Kingdom
- Products: Bourne & Hollingsworth Bar, Bourne & Hollingsworth Buildings, Reverend JW Simpson, The Blitz Party, The Prohibition Party, The Dark Circus Party, SS Atlantica, The Tweed Run and The Chap Olympiad
- Website: www.bourneandhollingsworth.com
- Footnotes / references partnerships: Secret Cinema, Les Enfants Terribles, Cocktails in the City, Torture Garden

Bourne & Hollingsworth Group is a London-based group, which owns a number of entertainment venues and events in the city. The first London venue was Bourne & Hollingsworth Bar, which opened in 2007.

The group has other large events partnerships with Secret Cinema and with The Tweed Run. It also managed The Chap Olympiad for a number of years.

== History ==
In 2007, the Group opened their first bar in London. It is situated in the building that was formally known as the Asylum on Rathbone Place in Fitzrovia, which is located between the City of Westminster and Camden. According to Time Out magazine, Bourne & Hollingsworth Bar (sometimes shortened to B&H Bar) has a chic feel and is located in the basement of the building. Since the opening of the bar, the Group have also run a number of well-publicised events at the bar and in other locations across London. One example is the Prohibition Party, which began as an in-house event at the B&H Bar, before moving to other larger venues.

The Group's Blitz events received coverage in The New York Times in 2008, on the anniversary of the London Blitz. A number of venues across London were used by B&H to host the Blitz-styled events. Costume attire is required at the event, which has received regular media coverage in London and is priced with a £30 entrance fee.

In 2009, The Chap Magazine teamed up with Bourne & Hollingsworth to provide an event that is called "The Chap Olympiad". The event had previously been managed by The Chap for a number of years, before Bourne & Hollingsworth played a major part in the expansion of the event. The event takes place in Bedford Square, London.

Bourne & Hollingsworth Group opened their second London-based bar in May 2009. The Swan & Edgar was located close to Marylebone station and was admired for its unique character. The bar within the building was built entirely of books, with the outside covered in tiles and books. The seating was covered in off-cuts donated by a number of Savile Row tailors.

Bourne & Hollingsworth launched a unique concept in 2009, with The Fourth Wall a wandering bar. The bar appeared at a different location each week, designed to recreate the familiar within the unfamiliar. The Fourth Wall was a complete replica of the Bourne & Hollingsworth Bar located at Rathbone Place. During the same year, the Group also launched Belle Epoque Party. It was later rebranded as The Dark Circus Party in partnership with Torture Garden.

In 2011, the Group worked with Viktor Wynd to create the festival known as Wyndstock.

In 2012, the sister bar of Bourne & Hollingsworth Bar, Reverend JW Simpson opened on Goodge Street. In September 2013, the bar launched a series of workshops called Spirited Sermons. The workshop focuses on a different spirit each week and has previously featured absinthe, Indian gin and Japanese whisky.

That same year, Bourne & Hollingsworth launched another pop-up known as Kitchen Party, collaborating with theatrical dining names such as Blanch & Shock, Dine Mile High, among others.

During the same year, the company supported Secret Cinema with all licensing and bar management including the Back to the Future event in 2014 and a Star Wars event in 2015, which brought the film The Empire Strikes Back to life. The event was an interactive theatre production, where the customers were part of the show. The project received positive reviews in the British press.

Bourne & Hollingsworth Buildings was opened in 2014 and quickly received acclaim for its dining offering. The Independent reported on the bottomless brunch that was on the B&H menu. A multi-faceted space, Bourne & Hollingsworth Buildings hosts life drawing classes, banquet dinners and drinks workshops (similar to Spirited Sermons) called B&H Handbook and Last Libations. In 2015, Bourne & Hollingsworth Buildings launched its basement bar, Below & Hidden.

In 2015, Bourne & Hollingsworth Group purchased The Tweed Run. Later that year, following the success of their work with Secret Cinema, Bourne & Hollingsworth supported Les Enfants Terribles for the event, Alice's Adventures Underground. The theme was based on Alice in Wonderland and received positive reviews, similar to those of the Star Wars event.
