= Swan & Edgar =

Former department store in London

Coordinates: 51.50985°N 0.13523°W

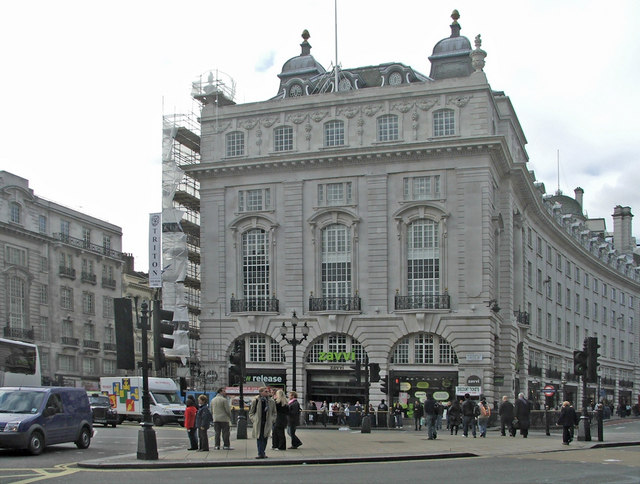
Swan & Edgar Ltd building, Piccadilly Circus

Swan & Edgar Ltd was a department store, located at Piccadilly Circus on the western side between Piccadilly and Regent Street established in the early 19th century and closed in 1982.

William Edgar ran a haberdashery stall in St James Market, before meeting George Swan. They first opened a shop together in Ludgate Hill which Swan had been operating, but moved to 20 Piccadilly in 1812. They then moved to 49 Regent Street when their former site was demolished to make way for Piccadilly Circus, which had been the home to the Western Mail coach offices and the Bull & Mouth public house. Swan died in 1821, however Edgar continued to use the name. By 1848 the premises had expanded to 45–51 and the entire corner of Piccadilly Circus.

In 1886, the old "partnership" businesses of Messrs Swan and Edgar and Messrs Halling, Pearce and Stone were acquired and amalgamated into a new Company named Waterloo House and Swan and Edgar (Limited). The directors of the new Company were John Swayne Pearce Esq (Chairman), Edward G. Stone Esq & Lewis Edgar Esq with two others to be elected by the shareholders at the first general meeting.

In 1896, the capital of the company was reduced following a resolution passed on 21 April and the name was changed to Swan and Edgar (Limited).

The premises were rebuilt and integrated in 1910–20 to a design by Sir Reginald Blomfield with the interior designed by Murray Adams-Acton. It became a popular place of assignation for Londoners for many generations: under the clock outside the department store, or sometimes the restaurant on the first floor, were often cited as meeting places. The store sold very high quality goods including the popular Merrythought teddy bear. The shop-front was one of the West End businesses targeted by the Suffragettes in their window-breaking spree on 21 November 1911. The store was hit in the last Zeppelin raid on London on 19 October 1917 and again rebuilt and remodelled in 1919, by Louis David Blanc and John James Joass.

In 1920, during a period of difficult trading for the industry, Swan and Edgar (Limited) was acquired by Harrods' Stores Limited for a reported sum of £600,000.

The business was sold to Charterhouse Trust in 1927 for £1 million, but two weeks later the business was taken over by the Drapery Trust for £1,250,000. The Drapery Trust became part of Debenhams later in the same year. It was Debenhams that closed the store in 1982 because of the high cost of modernisation. The building lay empty for a few years until it became the flagship UK store for Tower Records. In 2003, it was bought by Richard Branson of the Virgin Group and became a Virgin Megastore. The Virgin name disappeared in 2007 and was replaced by Zavvi but Zavvi went into receivership in 2009. The Sting, a fashion department store with branches in the Netherlands, Germany and Belgium, opened in the building in July 2010.

== Legacy ==
The Feathers public house at 43 Linhope Street, Marylebone, was renamed the "Swan & Edgar" in honour of this former department store.

Swan & Edgar was regularly mentioned by the staff in the sitcom Are You Being Served?, and featured in Barbara Pym's novel The Sweet Dove Died.
