= Clarence Hatry =

British financier (1888–1965)

Clarence Charles Hatry (16 December 1888 – 10 June 1965) was an English company promoter, financier, bankrupt, bookseller and publisher. The fall of the Hatry group in September 1929, which had been worth about £24 million (equivalent to £1,320,000,000 in 2025), is cited as a contributing factor to the Wall Street crash of 1929.

Economist John Kenneth Galbraith described Hatry as "one of those curiously un-English figures with whom the English periodically find themselves unable to cope."

== Rise in business ==
Born in Hampstead, London, Hatry began his professional career as an insurance clerk in London's West End. Shrewd fellow-promoters remembered that "Clarence" made his first big profit in silk. He then recouped the ensuing bankruptcy in insurance, through City Equitable, a modest reinsurance business. It was bought from German and Austrian owners in 1914 for £60,000; Hatry reorganised it in six months and sold a controlling interest for £250,000 (equivalent to £22,200,000 in 2025) to Gerard Lee Bevan and an associate called Peter Haig Thomas.

Hatry found the First World War a chance to profiteer, and by 1921, he was the respected director of 15 corporations.

He had already come to the attention of the American public for a different reason: transporting Eastern European immigrants to the United States and Canada.

In 1924, his Commercial Corporation of London failed for $3.75 million (equivalent to £197,000,000 in 2025). In some manner, three successive bankruptcies had left him successively richer. He built a new business empire, with investments in photographic supplies, cameras, vending machines, department stores and loan offices.

In early 1929 investors flocked to the Hatry group: General Securities Ltd. (of which Henry Paulet, 16th Marquess of Winchester, was chairman); Austin Friars Trust, Ltd., Dundee Trust, Oak Investment Corp., Associated Automatic Machines Corp., Retail Trade Corp., Photomaton Parent Corp. and Far Eastern Photomaton Corp.

Photomaton Parent Corporation Limited was set up by Clarence Hatry in 1928 to operate photograph machines in hundreds of public places such as railway stations and amusement parks.

By 1929, he had returned to the top table of corporate finance, and had worked out his greatest project, a merger of steel and iron concerns into the $40 million United Steel Companies. Just as this deal was to be consummated, the Stock Exchange Committee caught him borrowing $1 million (equivalent to £54,930,000 in 2025) on worthless paper. On 20 September 1929, the fraud became known, and the Hatry empire collapsed.

== Personal life ==
Hatry was not shy in displaying his wealth: his office suite had ornate bathrooms, he had swimming pools in his Mayfair homes, a yacht and a racing stable.

Hatry owned the Westward, once the largest yacht in British waters, between 1919 and 1924. He was known to dive from her bowsprit. He was a keen swimmer and remarked that "swimming is the only sport that I, personally, enjoy."

Between 1922 and 1926 Hatry lived at 56 Upper Brook Street, previously occupied by David Ricardo, economist, between 1812 and 1823. Number 56 was built on what was originally an independent plot some 41 feet (12 m) in frontage and 33 feet (10 m) in depth, with a narrow passage at the back from Blackburne's Mews. It was well known as the only house with a rooftop swimming pool in London, where he held bathing-suit parties.

Between 1924 and 1929 Hatry lived at 5 Great Stanhope Street in Mayfair, near the mansion of the daughter of King George V; Mary, the Princess Royal. During his four years there, Hatry spent £70,000 on the house. His improvements were of questionable but indisputably exuberant, taste, as a contemporary newspaper report recorded: "He installed – among other luxurious things – a swimming bath on the principal bedroom floor, and a stone-floored Tudor-style cocktail bar in the sub-basement." He called the bar "Ye Old Stanhope Arms-Free House". Until his imprisonment, Hatry swam in the pool every morning, throughout the year. Despite this, he was described as a "sallow, baldish, unhealthy-looking little man."

== Crash ==
Hatry asserted that in late August 1929 he had made a secret visit to the Bank of England to appeal to Montagu Norman for financing to allow him to complete a merger with United Steel Companies, a UK firm. Norman had adamantly refused Hatry's bid for a bridge loan. By 17 September, when Hatry stock began to fall on the London exchange, Hatry had liabilities of £19 million and assets of £4 million. On 19 September, after Hatry had approached Lloyds Bank in a last desperate bid for financing, he asked Sir Gilbert Garnsey of Price, Waterhouse & Co., a chartered accountant, to intervene on his behalf.

However, Hatry did not tell Garnsey that he had been issuing stocks to try to cover the deal, and some of the stocks were fraudulent: the same certificates had been printed twice and given as security to different leading banks. Hatry had obtained a $1 million loan on forged bearer scrip certificates of City of Wakefield 4½% stock, and an alert clerk had spotted the discrepancy.

Garnsey made a second approach to Norman for emergency financing, and was again rebuffed. By this point Norman had informed the chairman of the London Stock Exchange that the Hatry group was bankrupt. In the conversation, it was agreed that trading in Hatry shares would be suspended on 20 September.

On 20 September 1929 the London Stock Exchange committee immediately suspended all shares of the Hatry group, which had been worth about £24 million (equivalent to £1,318,220,000 in 2025). On that day, Hatry and his leading associates confessed to fraud and forgery in the office of Sir Archibald Bodkin, the Director of Public Prosecutions and, after lunching at the Charing Cross Hotel, were jailed.

The Wall Street Crash began late the following month.

== Trial and conviction ==
In late December 1929, Hatry, along with Albert Edward Tabor, Edmund Daniels and Charles Graham Dixon, were tried at the Old Bailey, charged with forgery and fraud. Hatry's friends subscribed $95,000 (equivalent to £5,220,000 in 2025) to pay for his defence.

Hatry, his voice shaking with emotion, said in his defence:

When I saw that matters were getting serious, I pledged every penny I possessed, my reputation, and maybe my liberty to avert what I knew would otherwise be a terrible crash. I took a grave risk at a time when I could easily have let things go and walked off a free man ... By taking this risk now my name has become a byword and I am irretrievably and irreparably ruined.

Hatry was sentenced to 14 years in prison (two of them at hard labour) and sent to Brixton Prison. The first two weeks of his sentence he had to sleep on bare boards, and for 28 days, he had to crush rocks on the stone pile. Then, he was given the slightly less difficult task of making mail bags. He also served a stint as prison librarian.

Hatry was released after serving nine years of his sentence thanks to the support of his lawyer Norman Birkett, K. C. Birkett's role in the Hatry trial is related in H. Montgomery Hyde's book, Norman Birkett (London, 1964).

== Comeback ==
After Hatry's release from prison in 1939, he bought Hatchards bookshop for £6,000 and "proceeded to turn around the ailing business". In 1946 he acquired the T. Werner Laurie Ltd. publishing firm where he appointed George Greenfield as the manager.

Hatry died, aged 76, in 1965.

== Bibliography ==
- The "Hatry Case": Eight Current Misconceptions (C. Nicholls & Co.: London, 1938)
- Light out of Darkness: On the Redistribution of Populations As a Solution to the Economic Problems of the World (Rich & Cowan: London, 1939)
- A. Wright, The Threadbare Plea: The Hatry Crash of 1929 (2018)
