= Curl Brothers =

Former department store in Norwich

- Type: Private company
- Industry: Retail
- Genre: Department store
- Founded: 1860
- Defunct: 1973
- Fate: Bought by Drapery Trust
- Successor: Debenhams
- Headquarters: Norwich
- Parent: Debenhams

Curl Brothers were a department store based in Norwich. The store later became part of the Debenhams chain.

== Early history ==
In 1860, three brothers from the Norfolk village of East Winch joined the drapery business of Buntings (a fellow department store lost by the bombing in the Second World War - now the site of Marks & Spencer). This partnership did not last long, and later that year they purchased the Rampant Horse Inn, converting it into shops and a warehouse. By 1900, the store had expanded taking on further nearby properties. Between the World Wars, Curls was bought by Ipswich department store business Footman, Pretty & Company, which was controlled by the Drapery Trust. By 1929, the store had grown to 51,000 square feet in size and included a restaurant which offered a six course lunch for two shillings and sixpence, and dominated Orford Place and Brigg Street.

== Modern History ==
In 1942, the store was completely destroyed by German fire bombing. The Buntings and Woolworths store suffered the same fate that night, as well as the RG Pilch sport shop, whose building was in the same block as Curl Brothers. Initially Jarrolds, another department store in the city allowed Curl Brothers to use their first floor before they transferred to a smaller property on Westlegate handed over by Norwich Union for use by burnt out businesses.

The old site lay empty, a giant hole in the middle of Norwich. It was used as both a water tank and as a car park. Work started on rebuilding in 1953, however the work was not completed until 1956. When the new store opened it had entrances on Brigg Street, Orford Place, Red Lion Street and Rampant Horse Street and had 97,000 square foot of retail space.

Debenhams continued to operate the store under the Curl Brother name until the 1970s when they rationalised the brand. Debenhams closed all its stores in May 2021.
