= Drapery Trust =

Former department store group

Drapery Trust Ltd
- Company type: Holding company
- Industry: Retail
- Founded: 1925; 100 years ago
- Founder: Clarence Hatry
- Defunct: 1970s
- Successor: Debenhams
- Headquarters: London, United Kingdom

Drapery Trust (initially called the Drapery & General Investment Trust Ltd) formed in 1925 by Clarence Hatry, a notorious British financier. He had made his fortune in speculating on oil stocks, and had convinced investors to promote department stores and bring them under the management of a retail conglomerate. The business was acquired by Debenhams in 1927 and was run as a subsidiary until the 1970s.

== History ==
Marshalls Managing Director Ronald Glaze had originally had the idea for the trust, which Hatry found commercially attractive, and Glaze would become the managing director of the new business. Each family owned department store was purchased by the issuing of public shares.

By 1927, the business had 65 stores, 11,000 staff and over 18 million sales annually, and had acquired the Piccadilly business of Swan & Edgar from Charterhouse Investment Trust for £1,250,000 to act as their flagship. The Scottish business of Pettigrew & Stephen was sold to the newly formed Scottish Drapery Corporation in the form of shares in the new organisation during 1927. However the business was acquired by Debenhams in November 1927, when they purchased 75% of the Drapery Trust shares at a cost of £2,350,000, which was funded by Hatry's company Austin Friars Trust purchasing £1,600,000 of Debenhams shares. The business was kept as a separate subsidiary from the main Debenhams group, but with board members of Debenhams joining the board of the trust. The business continued to grow by purchasing R R Talbot of Weymouth, Dorset, adding it to its Plummer Roddis business.

In 1929, as part of his fraudulent plan to raise the cash for his deal to purchase United Steel, Hatry forged £478,100 of shares in the Drapery Trust, but by September 1929 he had confessed to his crimes. In 1931, Lloyds Bank started proceedings to enforce recovery of £493,100 that was against mortgages of property due to concerns of fraudulent behaviour.

By 1932 the trust controlled:

- Bon Marche (Gloucester)
- Bobby & Co.(Margate and others)
- Curl Brothers, Norwich
- Dawson Brothers (London)
- Drages Furniture Store (High Holborn, Birmingham, Manchester)
- Frank Drury & Co (Manchester)
- Footman, Pretty & Co (Ipswich)
- Gardiner & Co (Ipswich)
- Green & Edwards Ltd
- J Howells (Ipswich)
- Jones & Co (Bristol)
- Edwin Jones (Southampton)
- William Lefevre
- Marshalls Ltd (the former Yorkshire arm of Marshall & Snelgrove, operated stores in Bradford, Harrogate, Leeds, Scarborough, Sheffield and York)
- Kennards (Croydon, Staines)
- Pauldens (Manchester)
- Plummer Roddis (Hastings & others)
- Scottish Drapery Corporation
- Selincourt & Sons
  - Also controlled Margaret Marks Ltd
- Spooner & Co (Plymouth)
- Staddons Ltd (Barking Road, London)
- Stagg & Russell (Leicester Square, formerly Stagg & Mantle and H C Russell)
- Warwick House (Birmingham)

However, in 1932 the company could not pay a dividend to Debenhams, when in 1931 it had paid £75,000. The company's finances did not improve, so by 1934 the business profits had fallen to £61,921 from £102,767 that had been made in 1933. Because of the worsening financial situation and the damaged reputation due Debenhams connections to Hatry, Maurice Wright, a member of both Debenhams and Drapery Trust board completed a rewriting of the capital in 1934, merging the three operations share holdings, Debenhams, Debenhams Securities and Drapery Trust, which slashed the company's issued capital from £15,100,000 to £6,000,000. The subsidiary continued to restructure by selling the Drages business to Great Universal Stores in 1937.

In the 1970s it was decided to bring all the business under one brand, and so the stores of the Drapery Trust were either converted into Debenhams, or were closed.
