= Tweed Run =

Club bicycle ride in London

The poster from the first ever tweed run.

The Tweed Run is a group bicycle living history ride through the centre of London, in which the cyclists are expected to dress in retro style traditional British cycling attire, particularly tweed plus four suits. Any bicycle is acceptable on the Tweed Run, but classic vintage bicycles are encouraged. Some effort to recreate the spirit of a bygone era is always appreciated. The ride dubs itself "A Metropolitan Cycle Ride With a Bit of Style."

== Inspirations ==
Among the inspirations for the Tweed Run was Jack Thurston's now disbanded Tweed Cycling Club, and several vintage attire-themed rides which were held in the north of England in the 1990s.

== First Tweed Run ==
Although previous cycling clubs have hosted vintage-themed rides before, the very first Tweed Run was held on 24 January 2009, and organised by Ted Young-Ing and Jacqueline Shannon via London Fixed Gear and Single Speed, an online cycling forum. The second run was held on 10 April 2010, for 400 registered riders.

Since then the Tweed Run has become an annual event with major sponsors. Participants were limited to 500 (due to health and safety rules), but by 2018 the numbers had increased to 1000. Due to high and popular demand, a ticket ballot system had been in place but are now sold on a first come first served basis, often selling out very quickly.

== Gallery of 2013 event in London ==
In 2013, the ride went through Fitzrovia to Marylebone

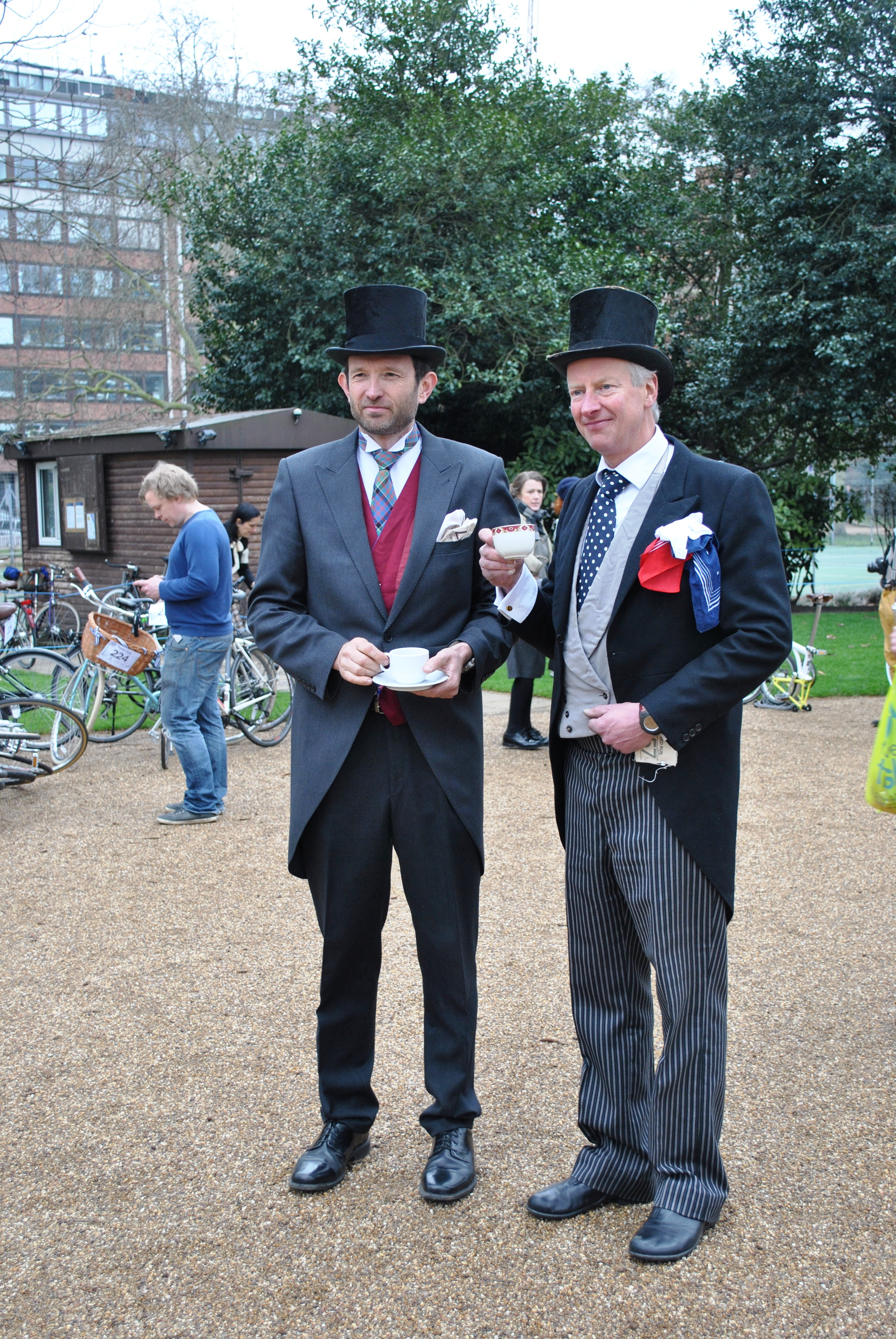

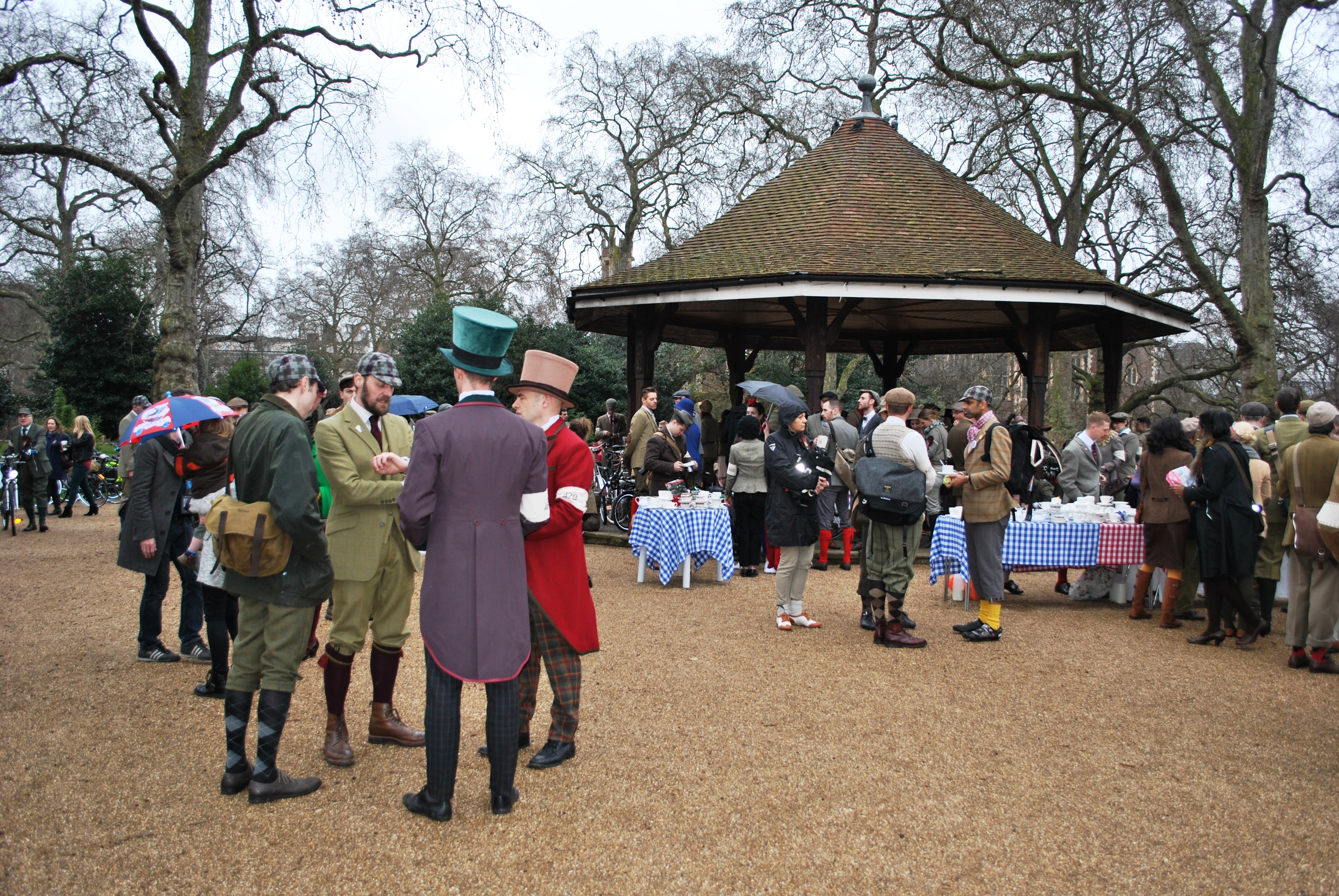

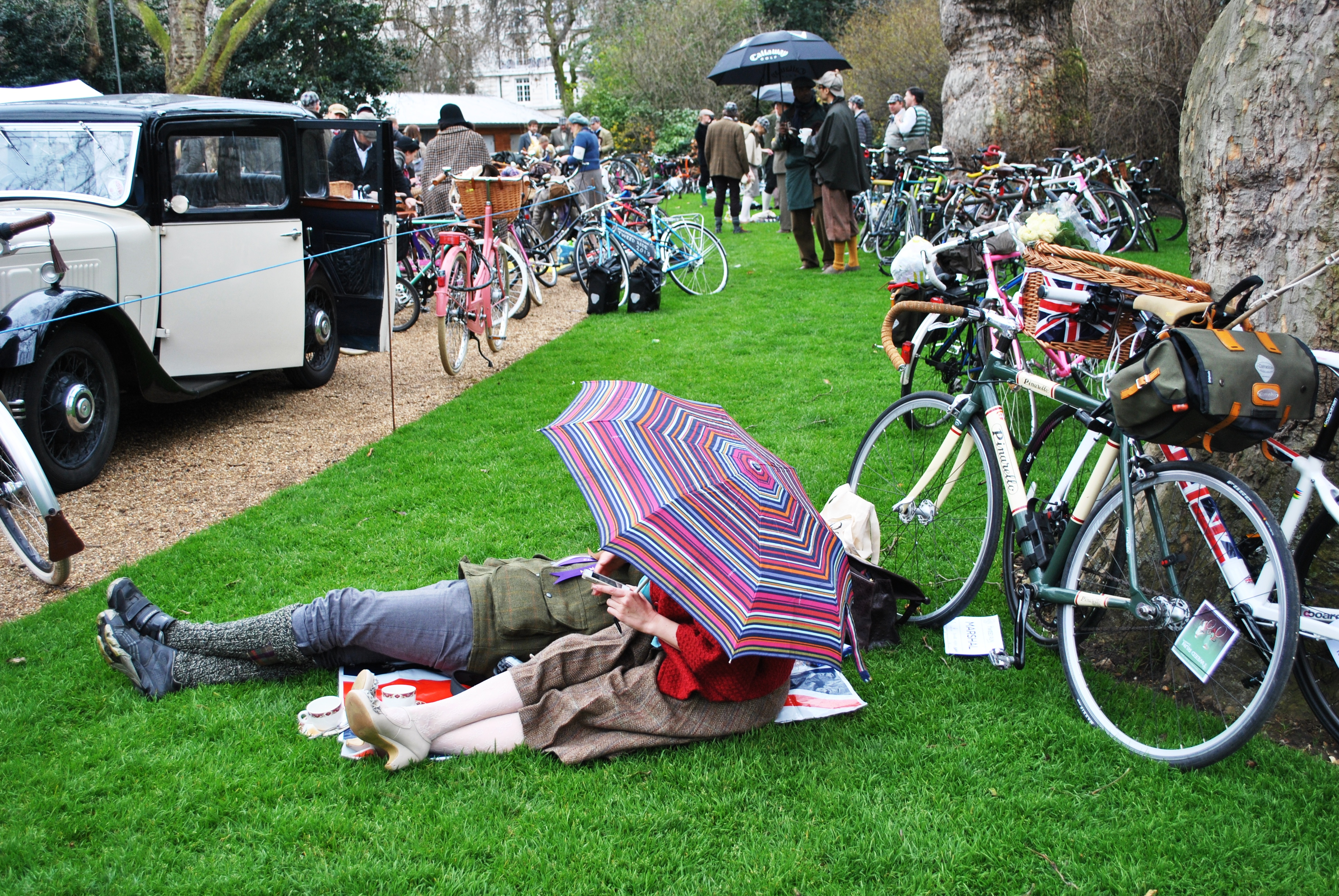

== Gallery of event in Melk (Austria) ==
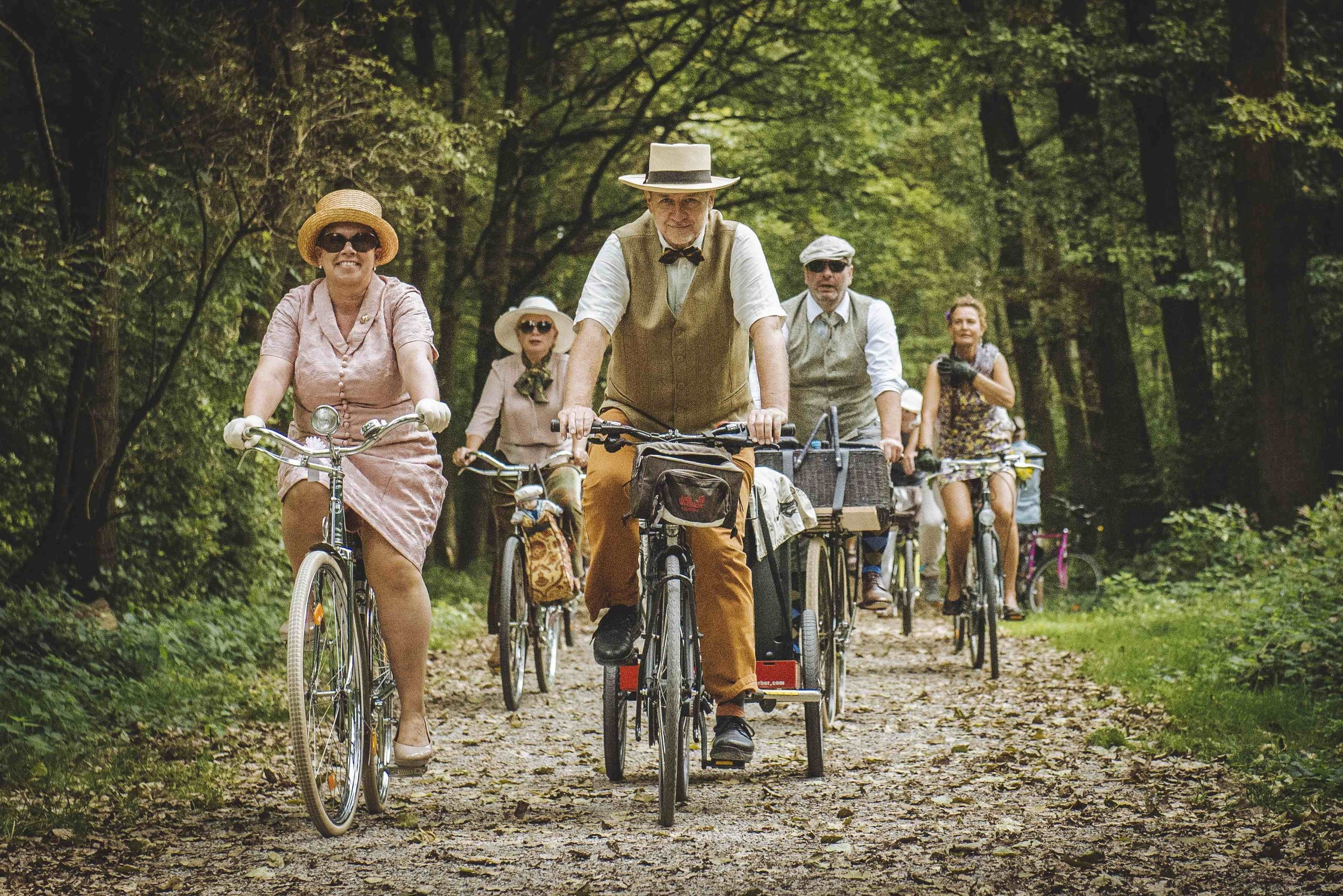

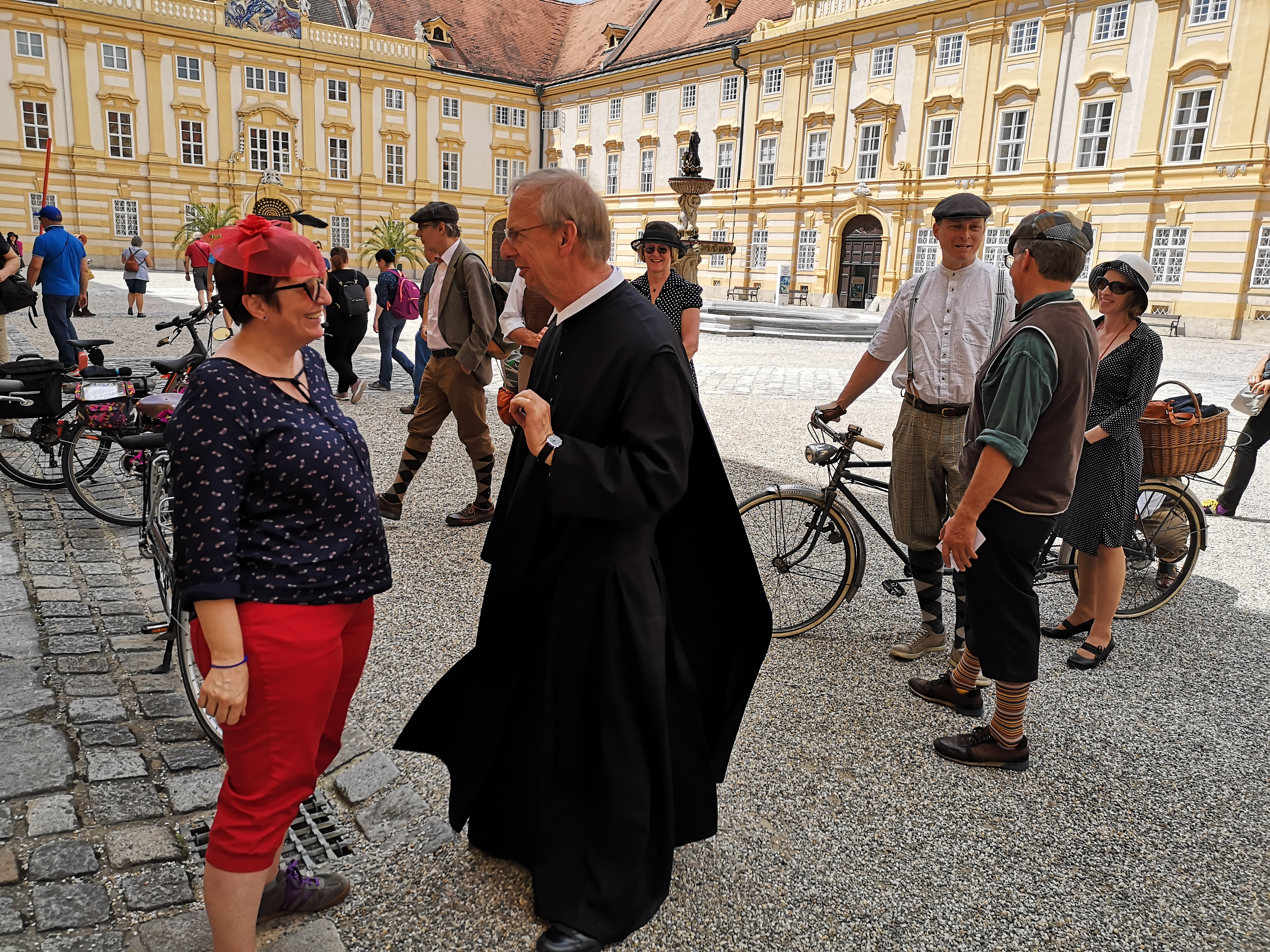
Tweedride Melk with Pater Martin

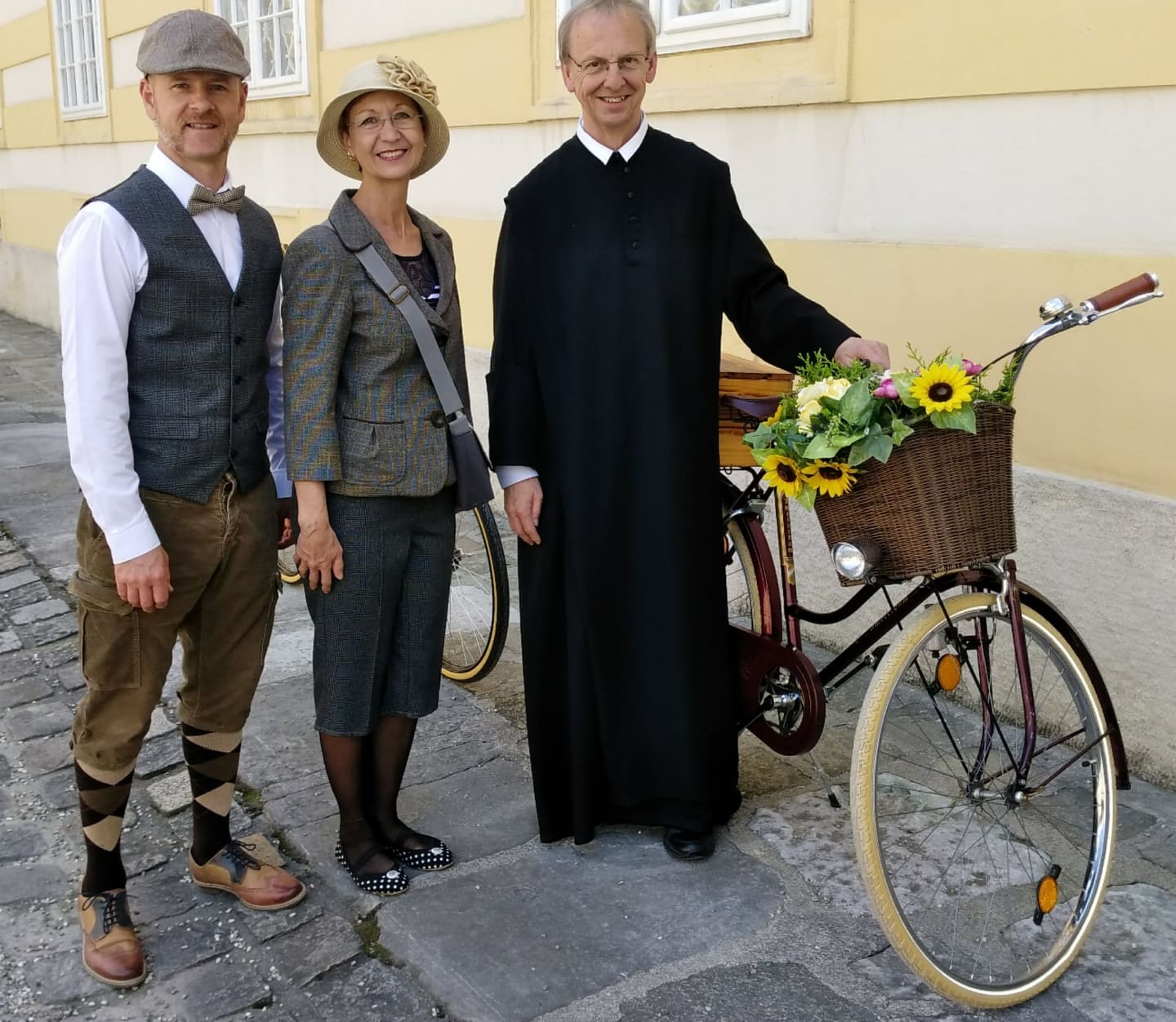
Tweedride Melk with Pater Martin2

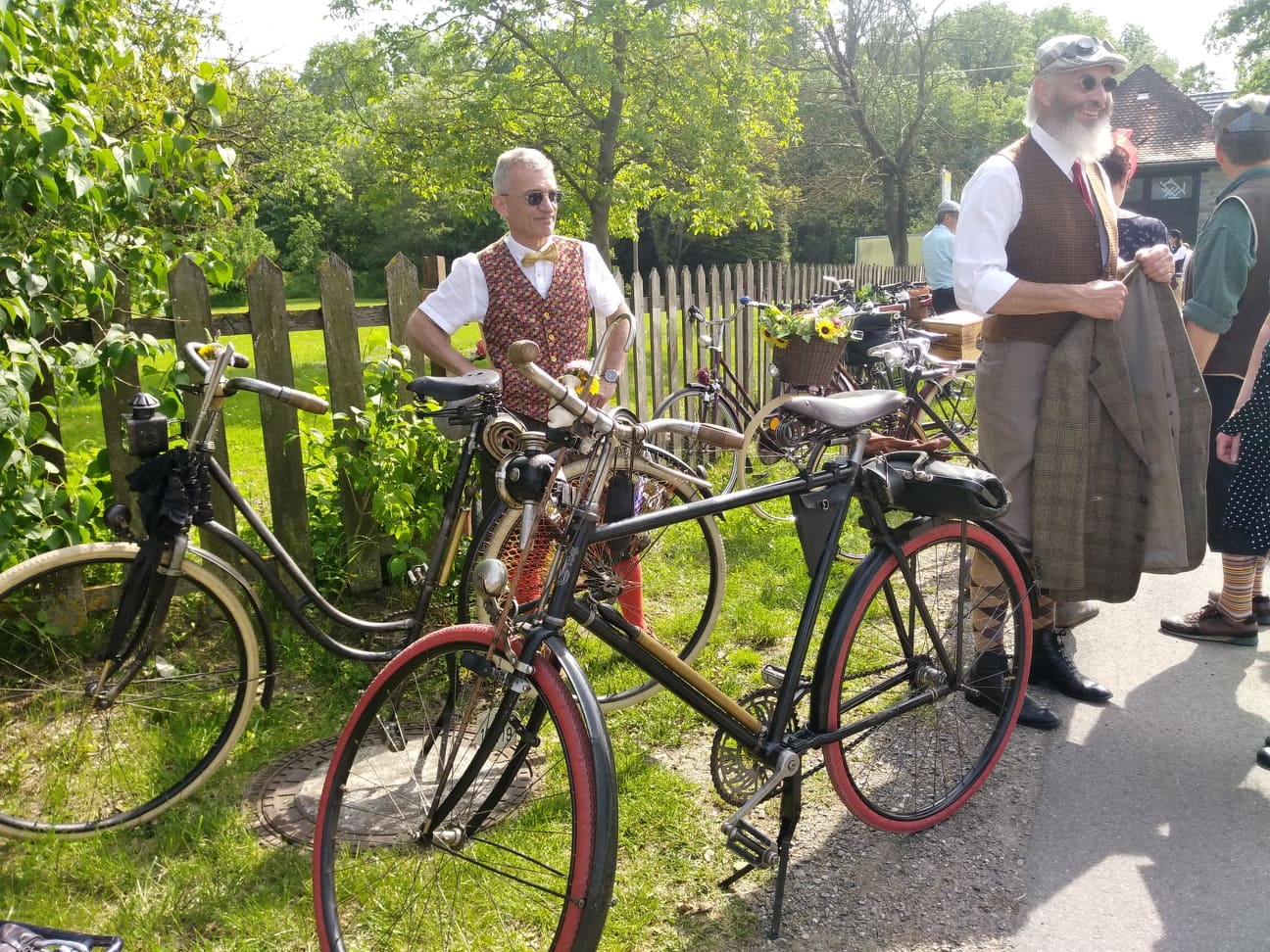
Tweedride Melk at the danube

== See also ==
- Bike bus
- Clothing-optional bike rides
- Critical Mass
- Cycle touring
- Outline of cycling
