= Bobby & Co. =

Former department store group

Bobby & Co. was a provincial department store group based mainly in seaside towns on the south coast of England. The business operated from 1887 until 1972. During the 1920s it became part of the Drapery Trust, which in turn became a subsidiary of Debenhams.

== History ==
=== Early history ===
In 1887, Frederick James Bobby (1860-1941) bought an established drapery store in Margate, Kent, located on the corner of High Street and Queen Street. The business grew to incorporate several neighbouring premises. In 1900, the business was incorporated and an expansion programme was begun, opening stores in specially selected towns, mostly seaside resorts. Stores were opened in Leamington Spa (1905), Folkestone (formerly C J Saunders; purchased 1906), Eastbourne (formerly Atkinson & Co., trading as Strange & Atkinson; purchased 1910), Torquay (formerly Robert Thomas Knight; expanded 1921 with the purchase of Iredales), Cliftonville, Bournemouth (opened 1915 on the site of Hugh King; later extended) Exeter (formerly Green & Son, acquired 1922) and Southport. In 1919, the company announced that the profits from the previous year stood at £43,542, which showed a substantial increase on 1914's profit of £17,086.

In the 1920s the business employed the artist F Gregory Brown to design a number of advertisement posters, which were printed by Bobby's own print shop and displayed in railway stations. Brown was also employed, at the same time, by Kensington department store Derry & Toms.

=== 1927-1972 ===
Frederick Bobby retired from the business in 1927, selling his shares to a recently formed retail conglomerate, the Drapery Trust. The Bobby & Co. group was run as a separate entity within the trust, chaired by Frederick Bobby's son. The company was funded to further expand, incorporating the Bristol department store of John Cordeux & Son (renamed Bobby & Co.) in 1928. The Margate store was refurbished in 1937. By this time the Bobby & Co. subsidiary had expanded to include Dusts of Tunbridge Wells, Handleys of Southsea, Haymans of Totnes, Hills of Hove, Hubbards of Worthing, Simes of Worcester, Taylors of Bristol and Wellsteeds of Reading.

The Exeter store was destroyed during the Blitz of 1942, with the store moving into smaller premises in Fore Street, where they stayed until 1964. In 1961, architect George Baines designed a new store for the junction of Sidwell Street and the High Street. Work was commenced by contractors, Bovis on the 123,000 square foot store in 1962, with the store finally opening its doors in March 1964.

In the early 1970s the decision was taken by the Debenhams board to rationalise the entire group and bring the majority of their department stores under the Debenhams brand. The stores in Margate and Cliftonville were closed in 1972, while all other stores trading under the Bobby's name were rebranded as Debenhams.

=== 2021-present ===
In September 2021, the former store in Bournemouth was reopened, after the collapse of Debenhams, under the Bobby's/Bobby & Co. name as an independent concept department store hosting local independent retailers.
