= Edwin Jones (department store) =

Former English department store chain

Edwin Jones & Co. Ltd
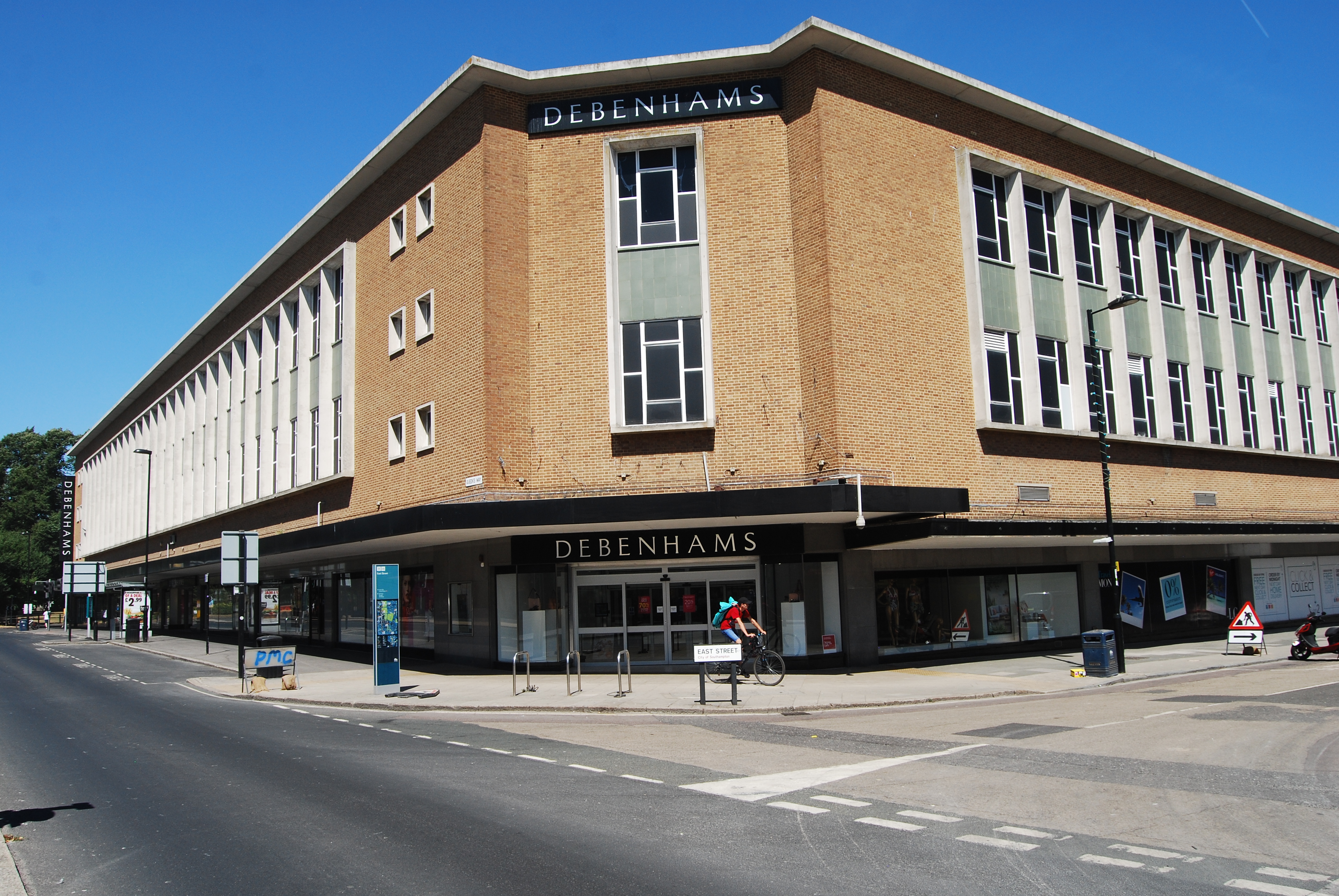
- The store, trading as Debenhams, in 2018
- Trade name: Debenhams (1973–)
- Company type: Subsidiary (1928–1973)
- Traded as: Private (1860–1928)
- Industry: Retailing
- Founded: 1860; 166 years ago
- Founder: Edwin Jones
- Defunct: 1973; 53 years ago
- Fate: Re-branded as Debenhams
- Successor: Debenhams
- Headquarters: Southampton, England UK
- Key people: Edwin Jones (Founder)
- Products: Clothing and Department
- Revenue: See parent company
- Net income: See parent company
- Parent: Debenhams plc (1928–present)

Edwin Jones was a large department store in Southampton, England founded in 1860 in East Street, Southampton with further stores established in Old Christchurch Road, Bournemouth, and Clinton Arcade, Weymouth. The business became part of the Drapery Trust, later a subsidiary of Debenhams, in 1928. The store was re-branded as Debenhams in 1973.

== History ==
In 1860, Edwin Jones and his sister, along with a 12-year-old apprentice, opened a small single-fronted shop. They later expanded to larger premises on the same street and subsequently expanded the store by purchasing the neighboring Blue Boar pub.

In 1880 he bought buildings facing the park in East Street, after failing to purchase the Wesleyan Chapel, which he demolished and built into what was called the Queen's Building. Prior to this expansion, Edwin Jones had become the mayor of Southampton in 1873 and 1875, retiring as a councilor in 1890. At this point he was appointed the Deputy Lieutenant of Hampshire, a post he held until his death six years later.

The business further expanded after Edward Jones' death with the new Manchester House building, however in 1928 the business was purchased by Drapery Trust, a subsidiary of Debenhams but continued to operate under its original name.

During World War II the store was destroyed during The Blitz, and the new store was not completed until 1959 from a design by architects Healing & Overbury. The store continued to operate under the Edwin Jones name until 1973 when Debenhams renamed the store in their name as part of their rationalization program.

In 2020, all Debenhams stores were closed during the COVID-19 pandemic and the chain went into administration, although continued to trade online. During this period it was announced that the Southampton store would remain closed permanently.

In September 2022, planning permission was given for the building to be demolished and replaced with 600 Apartments. Demolition took place in August 2025.
