= Thwaites & Reed =

Oldest clockmakers in the world

- Logo

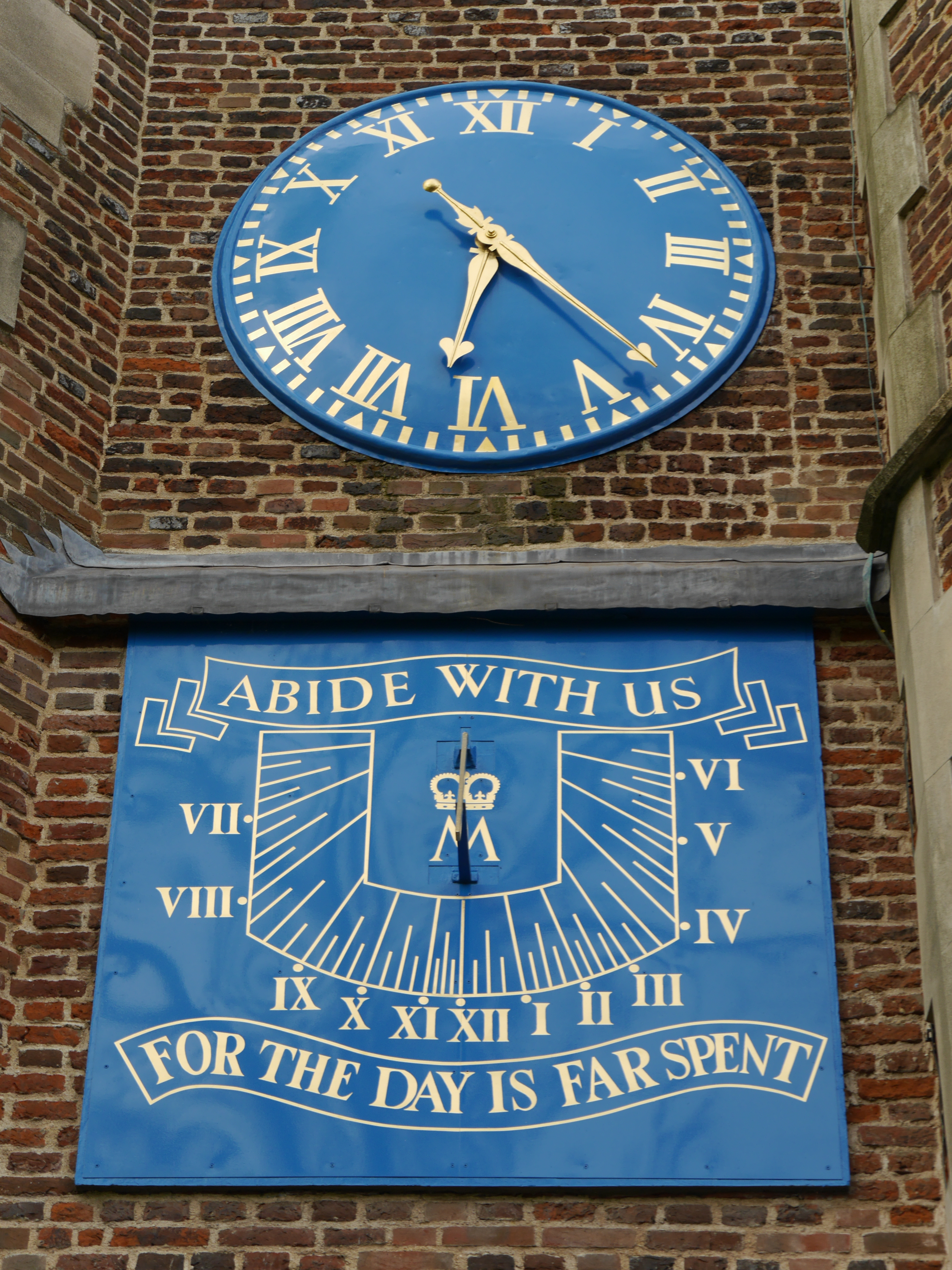
- Clock by A & J Thwaites, 1793, St Mary's Church, Barnes.
- Type: Private
- Industry: Clocks
- Founded: 1740
- Headquarters: Rottingdean, Brighton, East Sussex, England
- Products: Clocks
- Website: www.thwaites-reed.co.uk

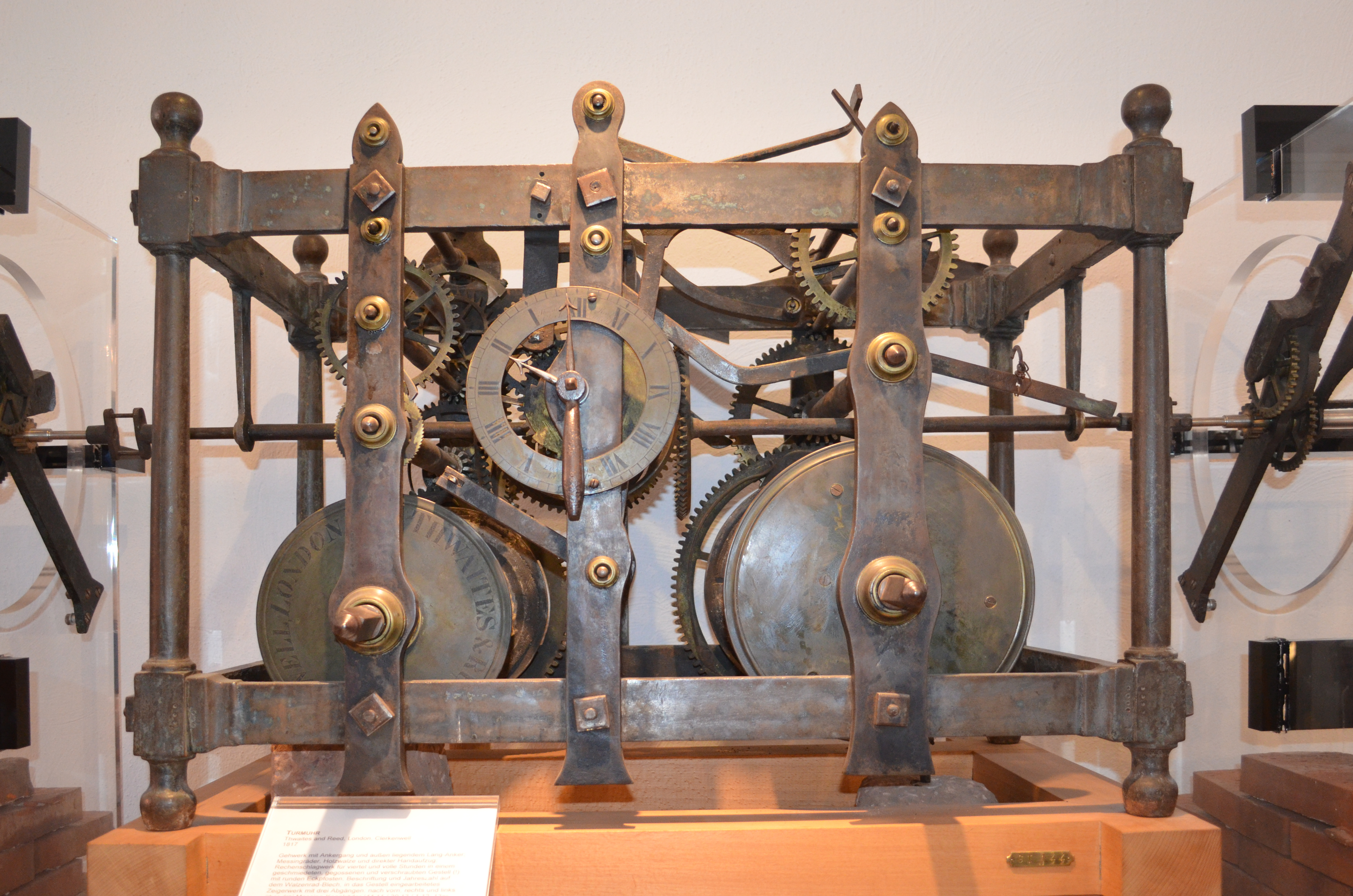
Clock from Thwaites & Reed, 1817, now in Hessenpark, Germany

Thwaites & Reed has been in continuous manufacture since its foundation and claims to be the oldest clock manufacturing company in the world. Geoffrey Buggins MBE, the last of the original family clockmakers, saw drawings of Thwaites clocks dating back to 1610. These drawings and other early records prior to 1780 went missing but other records from that date are stored with the London Metropolitan Archives. Further records are stored by Thwaites & Reed up to present day.

The firm produced a catalogue of turret clocks and other items in 1878 claiming upward of 4,000 church and turret clocks made in their factory since the establishment of the business (there is also a later incomplete list showing the date of supply and purchasers of turret clocks to 1902). The business of John Moore, a former apprentice, was acquired in 1899. Up to 1900, 2978 domestic clocks were made with serial numbers in chronological order. Other clocks were not listed. For 30 years, the firm maintained all the clocks at the Palace of Westminster, including the Great Clock.

Other than Thwaites & Reed, associated tradenames were:

- Aynsworth Thwaites [& Co.] (1740-)
- Aynsworth & John Thwaites (c.1792-)
- John Thwaites [& Co.] (c.1795-)

The company was trade supplier of movements to many well known historic clockmakers including Dutton, Dwerrihouse, Ellicott and Vulliamy and in more recent times well known retailers including The Franklin Mint, Asprey and Garrards. During its ownership by FW Elliott Ltd it also made movements under the Elliott brand.

In 1850 the company claimed to be 'the original inventors of the spiral door-spring', 'in use upward of twenty-five years at the Bank of England, and many other public establishments'.

== History ==
=== Aynsworth Thwaites ===
John Thwaites was a clockmaker at the beginning of the 17th century and from this extended family Aynsworth Thwaites founded the business about 1735 and is known to be in Rosoman Street, Clerkenwell, London in 1740, and continued there until 1780. Thereafter the firm traded from Bowling Green Lane and in the 18th and 19th centuries became the most prolific in England producing turret and domestic clocks of all descriptions including rare musical clocks and was the main supplier to the Turkish market (the Ottoman Empire) (Cite The Musical Clock Arthur WJG Ord-Hume). The company's earliest recorded commission and still in use, was a turret clock for Horseguards Parade made in 1740 but not finished until 1768, and a domestic long-clock about 1770 for the British East India Company. The complexity of the Horseguards clock is the result of many previous years' clockmaking experience, but older work has not been identified.

=== John Thwaites ===
Aynsworth was succeeded by John Thwaites (c. 1757-1826), who was head of the firm from 1780, and master of the Clockmakers' Company in 1815, 1819, and 1820; In 1816, Thwaites partnered with George Jeremiah Reed (trading for the most part as 'John Thwaites & Co.' at this time).

=== Thwaites & Reed ===
John Thwaites died on 29 October 1826, whereupon his widow, Henrietta, continued in partnership with George Jeremiah Reed (who was her nephew). From this time onwards the company's name was firmly established as 'Thwaites & Reed'. Henrietta Thwaites died, at the age of 88, on 23 October 1845.

Reed's son John Thwaites Reed was apprenticed to his father, and went on to lead the firm after his father's death. Later Thomas Buggins served as apprentice to John Thwaites Reed; in 1856 Thomas Buggins purchased the business from Henrietta Reed, the widow of George Jeremiah Reed, and the business remained in the Buggins family for four generations, the last being Geoffrey Thomas Edwin Buggins MBE.

In the 1880s the firm described itself as a maker of Church, Factory, House and Carriage clocks, and 'Clock Manufacturers to the Honourable Board of Ordnance, H.M. Navy, Board of Excise, East India Company, Corporation of the City of London, Bank of England, &c.'. A century later, in 1982, the firm was appointed a royal warrant as Turret Clockmakers to HM The Queen.

Geoffrey Buggins realised that the business could not continue as it was, in the post-war world; however Simon Mackay (Lord Tanlaw) a keen horologist and FBHI took an interest and he became temporary owner, serving as Chairman from 1971-1974. He financed the series of replica clocks (over 10,000 built in limited editions): from 1972 to 1980 ten types of replica clocks (including the Benjamin Franklin Clock, Congreve Rolling Ball Clock, two reproductions of the historical Giovanni di Dondi clock (by Peter Haward), various skeleton clocks and the inclined Plane, Rack, and Rising Works Drum Clocks) were made as limited editions. The team of employees included two exceptionally talented clockmakers, John Vernon and Peter Haward. In 1977 a team from the firm, led by John Vernon, oversaw the rebuilding of the clock at the Palace of Westminster ('Big Ben') following a structural failure.

Geoffrey Buggins continued to operate the business pending its transfer as a going concern to the National Enterprise Board (and in doing so ensured the entire business, its assets, employees and historic records were seamlessly moved from a historic family firm to a modern incorporated business), which was eventually sold by the National Enterprise Board to F.W.Elliott Ltd (1978). Geoffrey Buggins resigned as a director and his family connections ceased. The Elliott family has since sold the business to the Lee family (1991), and the business continues to be manufacturers of turret and domestic clocks.

== Clocks ==
- Clock at Horseguards Parade (1756)
- Tower Clock at St. Michael's Church in Charleston, SC (1764)
- East India Company, India (1770)
- Lincoln Cathedral north west tower (1775)
- The Royal Clock in the Queen Victoria Building in Sydney, Australia.
- Coach house entrance to Old Courtyard, Farlington School, Broadbridge Heath, Horsham, West Sussex, still in use - (John Thwaites, Clerkenwell, 1805).

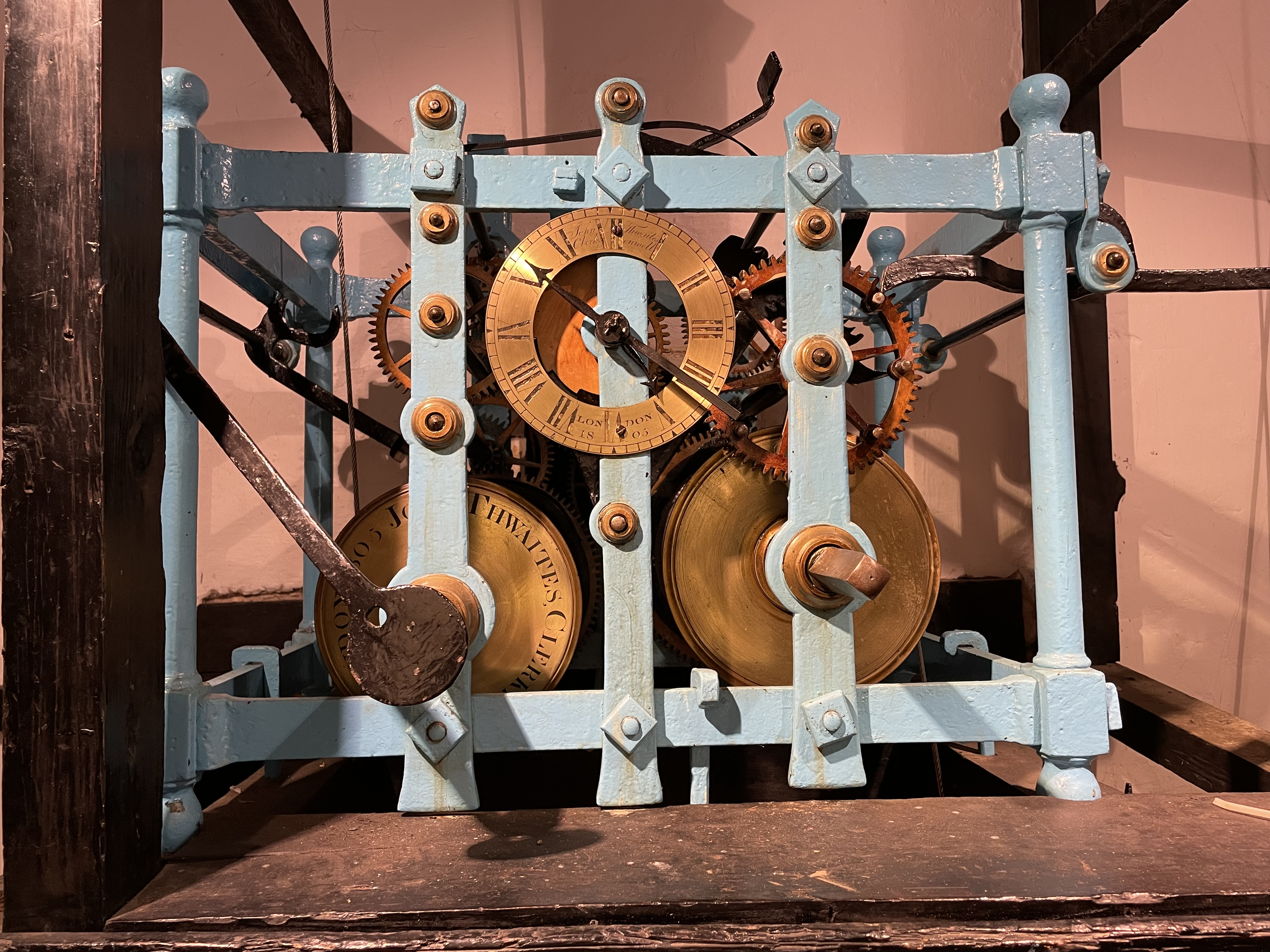
1805 John Thwaites Clerkenwell clock at Farlington School, West Sussex

- Royal Small Arms Factory Clock Tower (c 1783, refurbished in 1808)
- Old Bank of England clock (1811), which told the time remotely in sixteen different offices.
- Mast House Clock, Simon's Town Naval Base, South Africa (1816)
- Clock at All Saints’ Church, Wokingham (1817)
- Tower clock at the Evangelical Lutheran Church, Strand Street, Cape Town 1820 still in full working order
- St. John's Church, Parramatta, NSW, Australia - clock in north tower (1821)
- Penitentiary Chapel, - two clock faces, one facing North to the free settlers, one South to the convict barracks (installed 1834) Campbell St Gaol, Hobart, Australia (1828)
- Scots Church, Hobart, Australia (1824)
- St John's Anglican Church, New Town, Tasmania, Australia (1818)
- Holy Trinity Old Church, Margate (1845)
- The first Clock of the Torre Malakoff, Recife, Pernambuco, Brazil (1854).
- St. George Tabernacle, St. George, Utah,
- Prince Albert Memorial Clocktower, Hastings - Gothic style (1864)
- Queen Victoria Building, Sydney Australia.
- St. Peter's Church, St George, Bermuda
- St. Luke's Anglican Church, Richmond Tasmania, installed in 1922 (originally installed in St David’s Church Hobart in 1828)
- St Giles' Church, Ollerton (1875)
- Bracken House Astronomical Clock (1959): built for the headquarters of the Financial Times, with Zodiac Calendar and Churchill's face emblazoned on it.
- Bow Bells at St Mary-le-Bow electric clock mechanism (1961)
- Fortnum & Mason of Piccadilly, with automata jacks of the founders, Fortnum & Mason in 19th-century costumes. (1964)
- Aqua Horological Tintinnabulator, Victoria Centre, Nottingham, England (Installed in 1973)

== See also ==
- List of royal warrant holders of the British royal family
