= Rowland Emett =

British cartoonist and sculptor

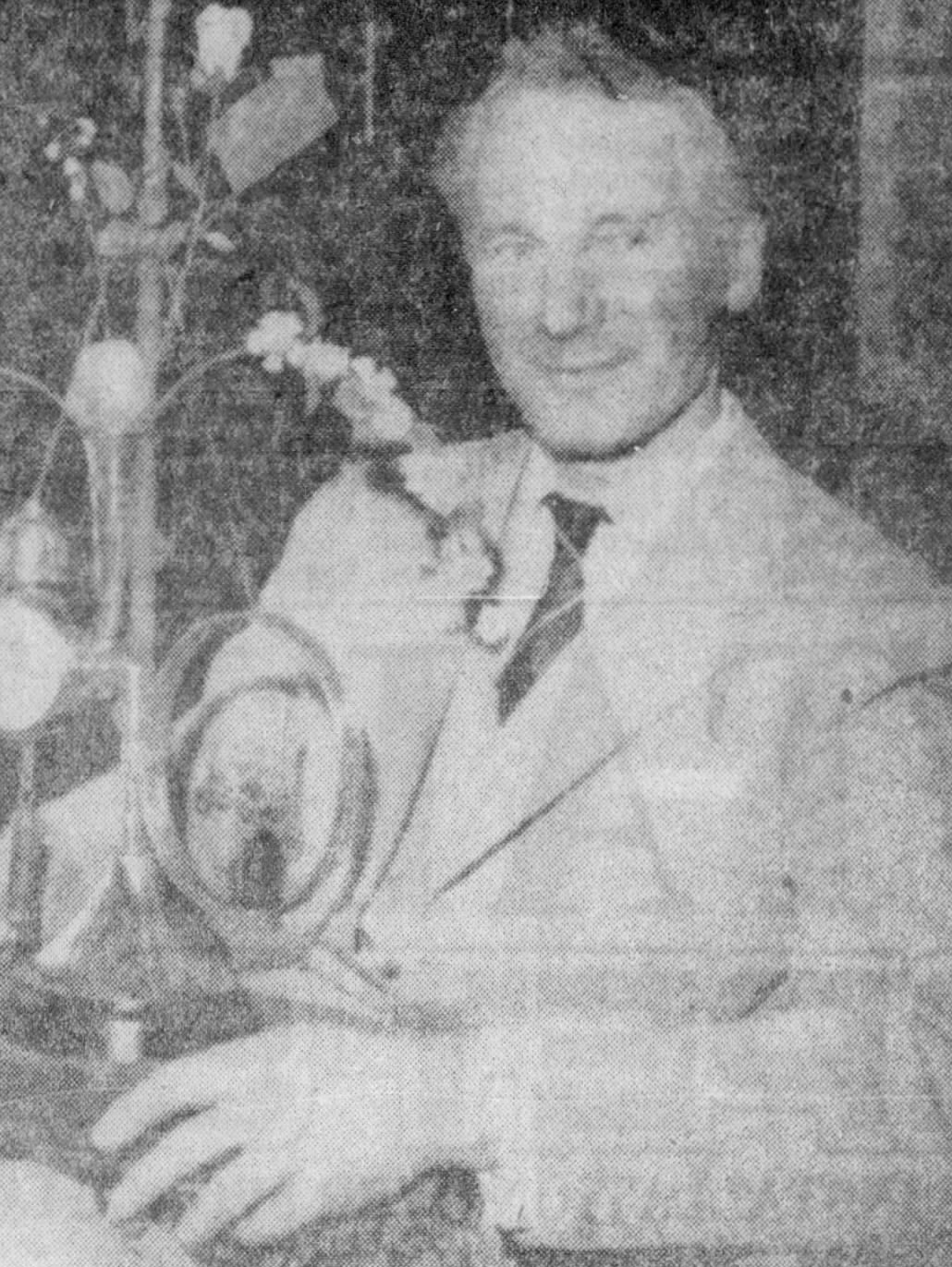
Emett c. 1977

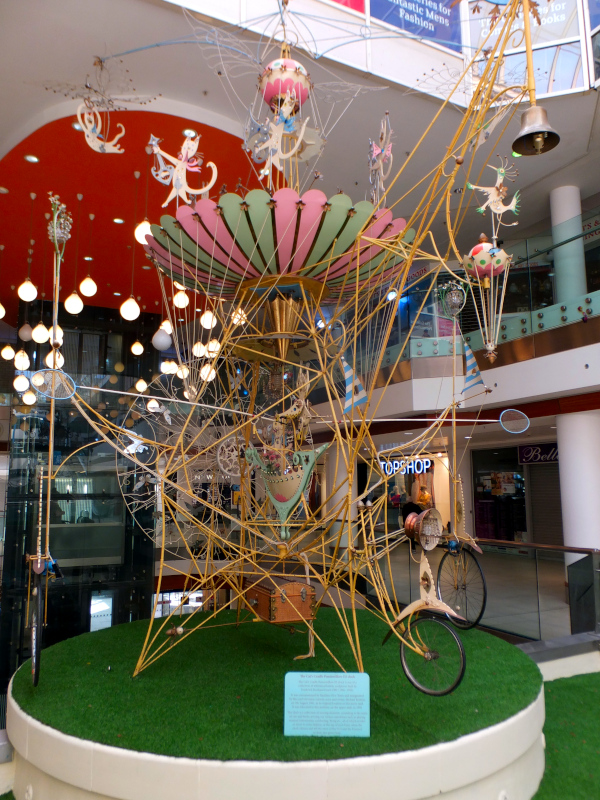
Cats Cradle Pussiewillow III Clock in Basildon

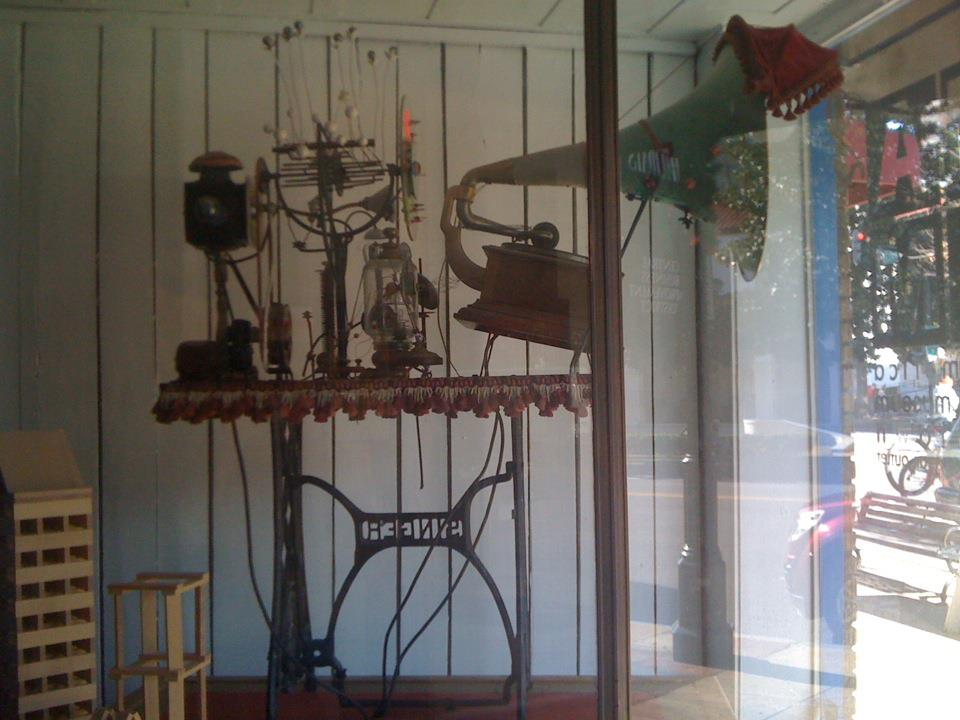
Visivision Machine, one of the "Things" created by Rowland Emett

Frederick Rowland Emett OBE (22 October 1906 – 13 November 1990), known as Rowland Emett (with the forename sometimes spelled "Roland" [as his middle name appears on his birth certificate] and the surname frequently misspelled "Emmett"), was an English cartoonist and constructor of whimsical kinetic sculpture.

== Early life ==
Emett was born in New Southgate, London, the son of a businessman and amateur inventor, and the grandson of Queen Victoria's engraver. He was educated at Waverley Grammar School in Birmingham, where he excelled in drawing, caricaturing his teachers and vehicles and machinery. When he was only 14 he took out a patent on a gramophone volume control. He studied at Birmingham School of Arts and Crafts and one of his landscapes, Cornish Harbour, was exhibited at the Royal Academy; it is now in the Tate collection.

== Later work ==
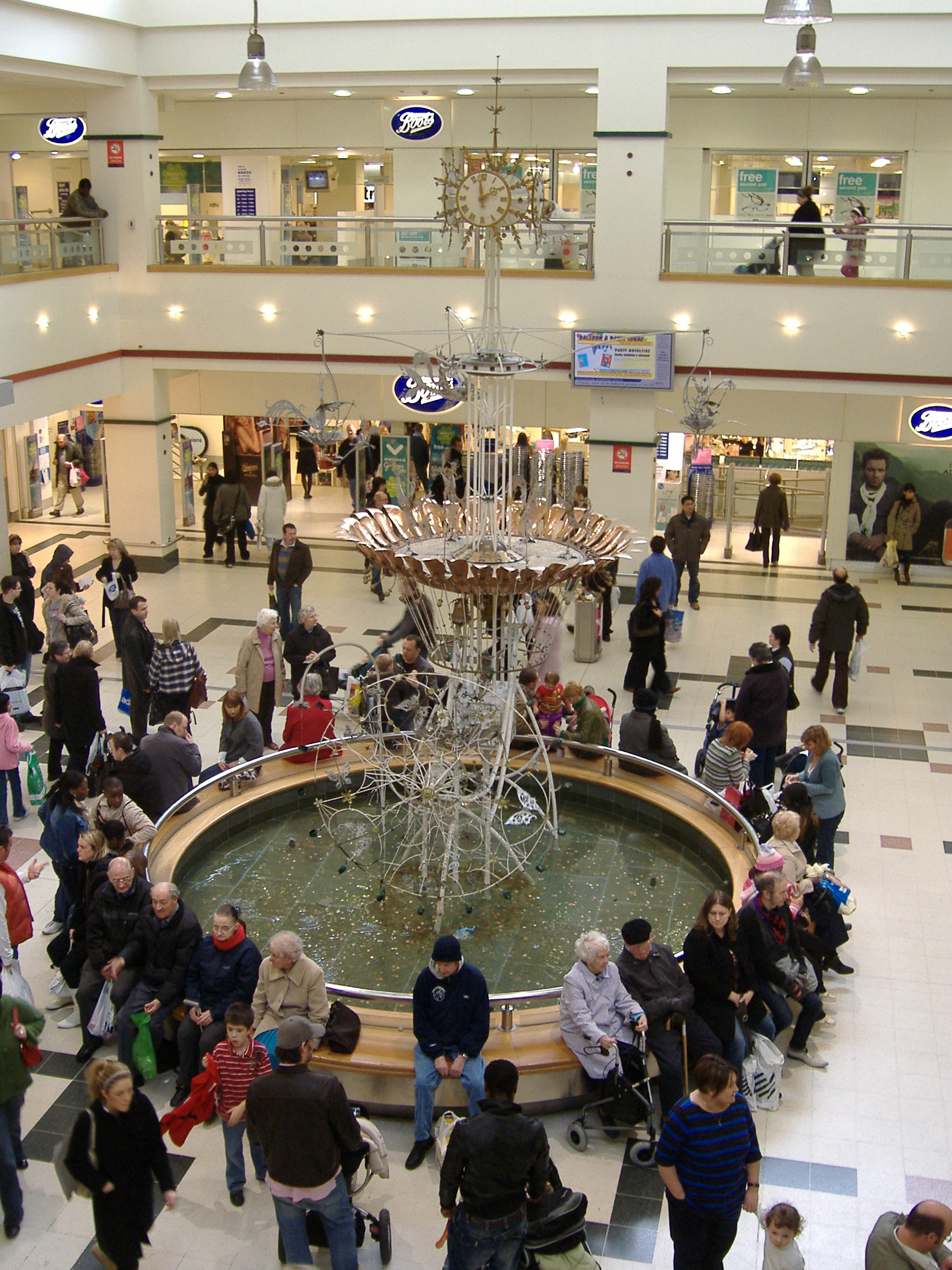
Aqua Horological Tintinnabulator, the Victoria Centre, Nottingham

An otherwise undistinguished career was interrupted by World War II, when he worked as a draughtsman for the Air Ministry while perfecting his gift for drawing cartoons. From 1939 until the 1950s, and less frequently in the 1960s, he published regularly in Punch and for many years when his work was published elsewhere it was credited to "Emett of Punch". His cartoons were seldom political, except when he caricatured bureaucratic absurdities, and his early subjects typically found humour in the difficulties of life in Great Britain during the second World War. His drawings soon started to include railway scenes and he gradually developed a unique concept of strange, bumbling trains with excessively tall chimneys and silly names.

On 12 April 1941 he married Elsie May Evans (who was always known as Mary), the daughter of a Birmingham silversmith. She managed his business interests. They had one daughter, Claire.

In 1947 his cartoons came to life on the stage of the Globe Theatre, London, in "Between the Lines", a scene for Laurier Lister's revue Tuppence Coloured, with Max Adrian as an eccentric signalman at Friars Fidgeting Signal Box. In 1951, at the Festival of Britain, his most famous steam locomotive, Nellie, was made into a copper and mahogany kinetic sculpture and with two other locomotives, Neptune and Wild Goose, was one of the festival's most popular attractions, operating the Far Tottering and Oyster Creek Branch Railway. There was a fatality when two trains collided. At this time he was living in Cornwall and working in a studio in a boat-loft at Polperro; later he returned to West Cornwall before settling for the rest of his life at Ditchling, in Sussex.

In 1953 Malcolm Muggeridge became editor of Punch and began systematic changes, but Emett continued to publish his work there, albeit less frequently. After a spread in Life magazine on 5 July 1954, his work was much in demand in the United States. He drew the front cover of the 29 December 1957 Radio Times.

He turned more and more to designing and supervising the building of what he called his "things" – always with silly names such as The Featherstone-Kite Openwork Basketweave Mark Two Gentleman’s Flying Machine, two copies of which exist, one of which was displayed in a glass case in the Merrion Centre, Leeds, the other on permanent display at the Mid-America Science Museum in Hot Springs, Arkansas. In 1966 he was commissioned by Honeywell to create a mechanical computer, which he named The Forget-Me-Not Computer. This was displayed at trade shows and was an exhibition at the Cybernetic Serendipity exhibition at the ICA in London in 1968 and finally added to the Ontario Science Centre collection in Toronto. In 1968 he designed the elaborate inventions of Caractacus Potts (played by Dick Van Dyke) for the film Chitty Chitty Bang Bang.

In 1973 his water-powered musical clock, The Aqua Horological Tintinnabulator, was installed on the lower floor of the Victoria Centre, Nottingham, until 2010. In 2015 it was reinstalled, refurbished and in full working order, to a new location on the upper mall. When commissioned, it played Rameau's Gigue en rondeau II from the E-minor suite of his Pièces de Clavecin when striking the hour and half-hour. Later modification enabled it to perform every fifteen minutes (the playback system was changed from tape to compact disc). In May 2026 the clock was dismantled for refurbishment, and it was announced that the clock would return to its original home on the lower floor again once complete.

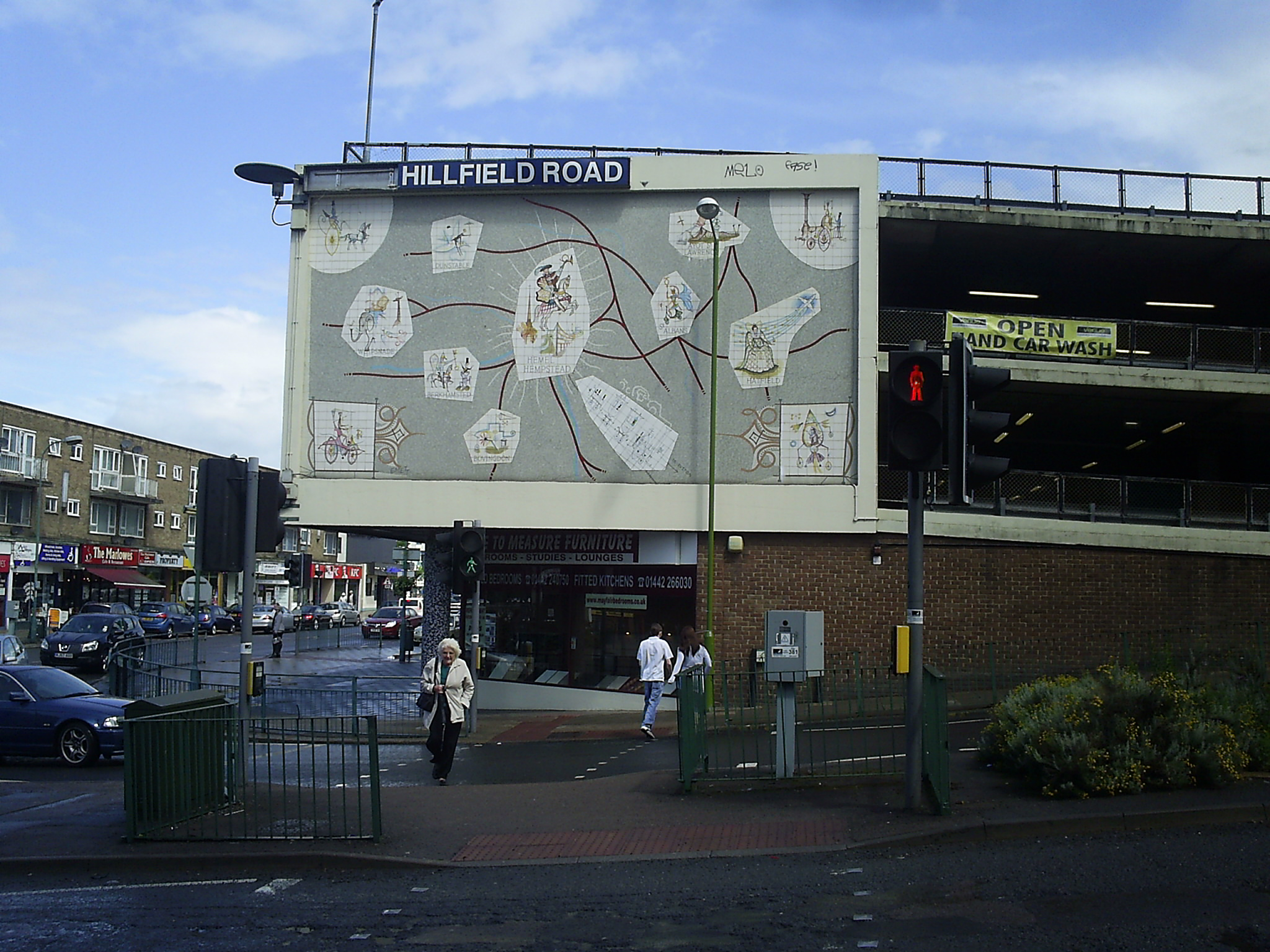
Whimsical map of Hemel Hempstead and its neighbours, erected in 1960 on the side of what is claimed to be the first multi-storey car park in the UK

A 30-foot-square mosaic by Emett, installed around 1960, can be seen on the side of the NCP car park in The Marlowes, Hemel Hempstead.

The Cats Cradle Pussiewillow III clock was commissioned by Basildon New Town and inaugurated by Michael Bentine on 7 August 1981. It is on display at Eastgate Shopping Centre in Basildon.

His larger works, such as Emettland, went on extended tours, ending up in prestigious venues such as the Smithsonian Institution in Washington, D.C. The Ontario Science Centre in Toronto has a collection of about ten Emett creations and every December displays the restored working pieces, usually under the title "Dream Machines".

The Mid-America Science Museum has had four of his inventions on permanent display for most of the museum's existence.

When asked how he came up with his strange designs, Emett remarked, "It is a well known fact that all inventors get their first ideas on the back of an envelope. I take slight exception to this, I use the front so that I can incorporate the stamp and then the design is already half done."

== Honours ==
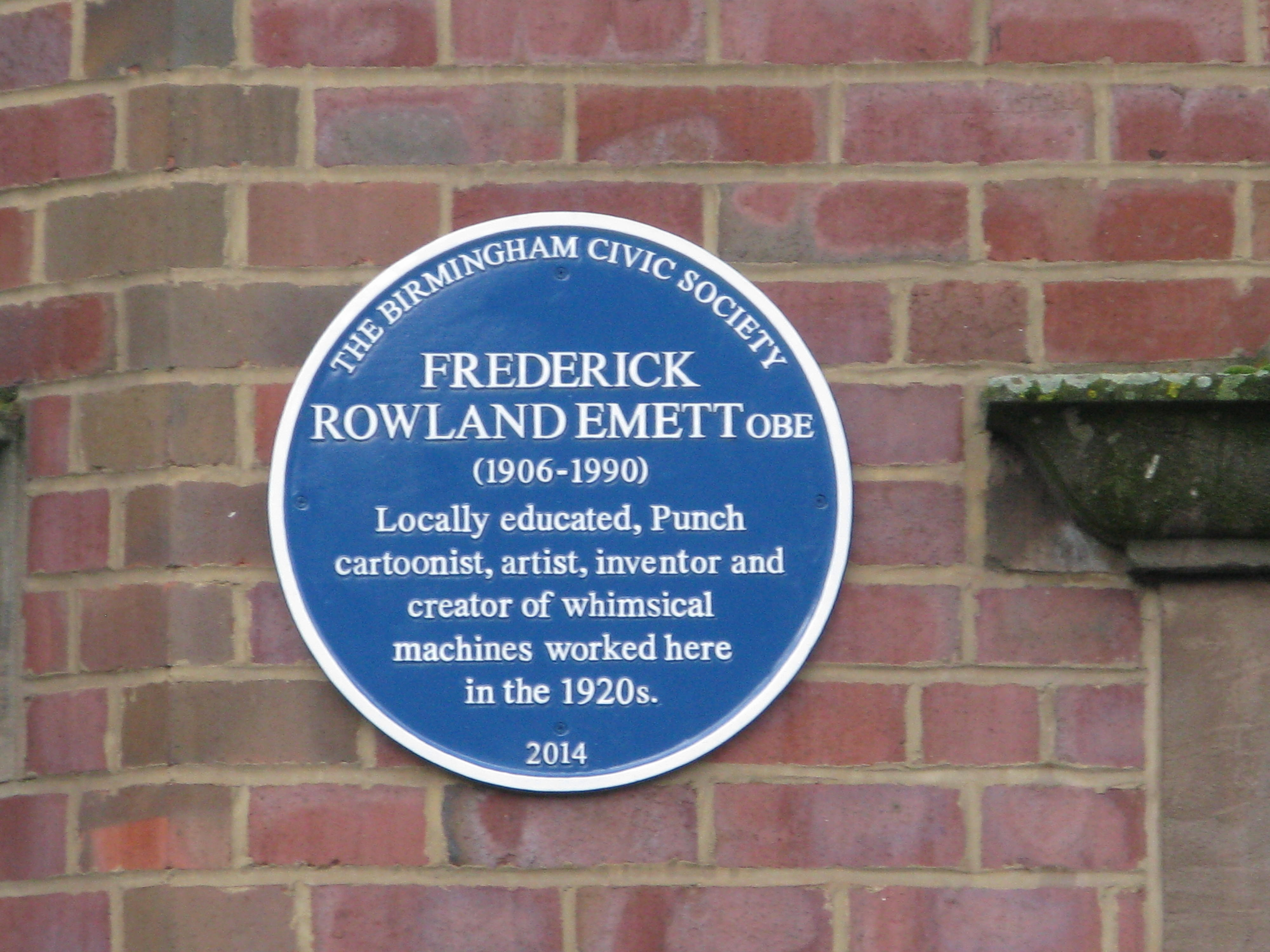
Blue plaque for Emett in Birmingham

In the 1978 New Year Honours, described as "Artist and Inventor", he was awarded an OBE.

== Later life and death ==
He died on 13 November 1990 in a Sussex nursing home.

== Legacy ==
=== Exhibitions ===
There is a permanent exhibition of representative examples of Emett's work at Stoneywish Nature reserve in Ditchling, East Sussex.

An exhibition of Emett's work was held at the Chris Beetles Gallery in London, and an accompanying fully illustrated catalogue written by Jacqui Grossart, entitled Rowland Emett from "Punch" to "Chitty-Chitty-Bang-Bang" and Beyond (ISBN 978-1-871136-00-5), was published by Chris Beetles Ltd. in 1988.

Until the early 2000s, the Featherstone-Kite Openwork Basketweave Mark Two Gentleman’s Flying Machine was on permanent display in the Merrion Centre, Leeds, in England in its own glass display cabinet, activated every 30 minutes to demonstrate the kinetic functions of the sculpture. It has since been removed from display but is periodically exhibited in the main thoroughfares. Several other Emett sculptures owned by the centre's management, including The Humbug Major Sweet Machine, The Fairway Birdie and the Clockwork Lullabye Machine, are now on permanent exhibition on the upper level of the retail centre.

An exhibition entitled Engines of Enchantment: The Cartoons and Machines of Rowland Emett, with accompanying lectures (including one by his daughter), was held at The Cartoon Museum in London in 2009.

In 2014, the Birmingham Museum and Art Gallery held an exhibition of Rowland Emett's cartoons and machines, including the five surviving 'inventions' from Chitty-Chitty-Bang-Bang (all in working order), television interviews with Emett, and cine-footage of the 1951 Festival of Britain railway. The BMAG cites "This exhibition will be the biggest ever display of Emett's work, which is loved by many across the world and will tell the story of his life, living and working in Birmingham."

In 2022, the Manchester Science and Industry Museum exhibited and demonstrated Emett's A Quiet Afternoon in the Cloud Cuckoo Valley, a moving sculpture which according to the museum "tells the story of a train journey through Cloud Cuckoo Valley on the fictional Far Tottering and Oyster Creek Railway".

=== Rowland Emett Society ===
In 2012 the Rowland Emett Society was formed with the object of allowing "anyone interested in the work of Frederick Rowland Emett to discover more about his remarkable cartoons, artworks and machines". The Society published a newsletter every two months.

By 2022, the Society appeared to be defunct and its website was no longer responding.

== See also ==
- Heath Robinson (1872–1944)
- Storm P. (1882–1949)
- Rube Goldberg (1883–1970)
- Steampunk
