= Aqua Horological Tintinnabulator =

Water-powered clock in Nottingham, England

Coordinates: 52.956°N 1.147028°W

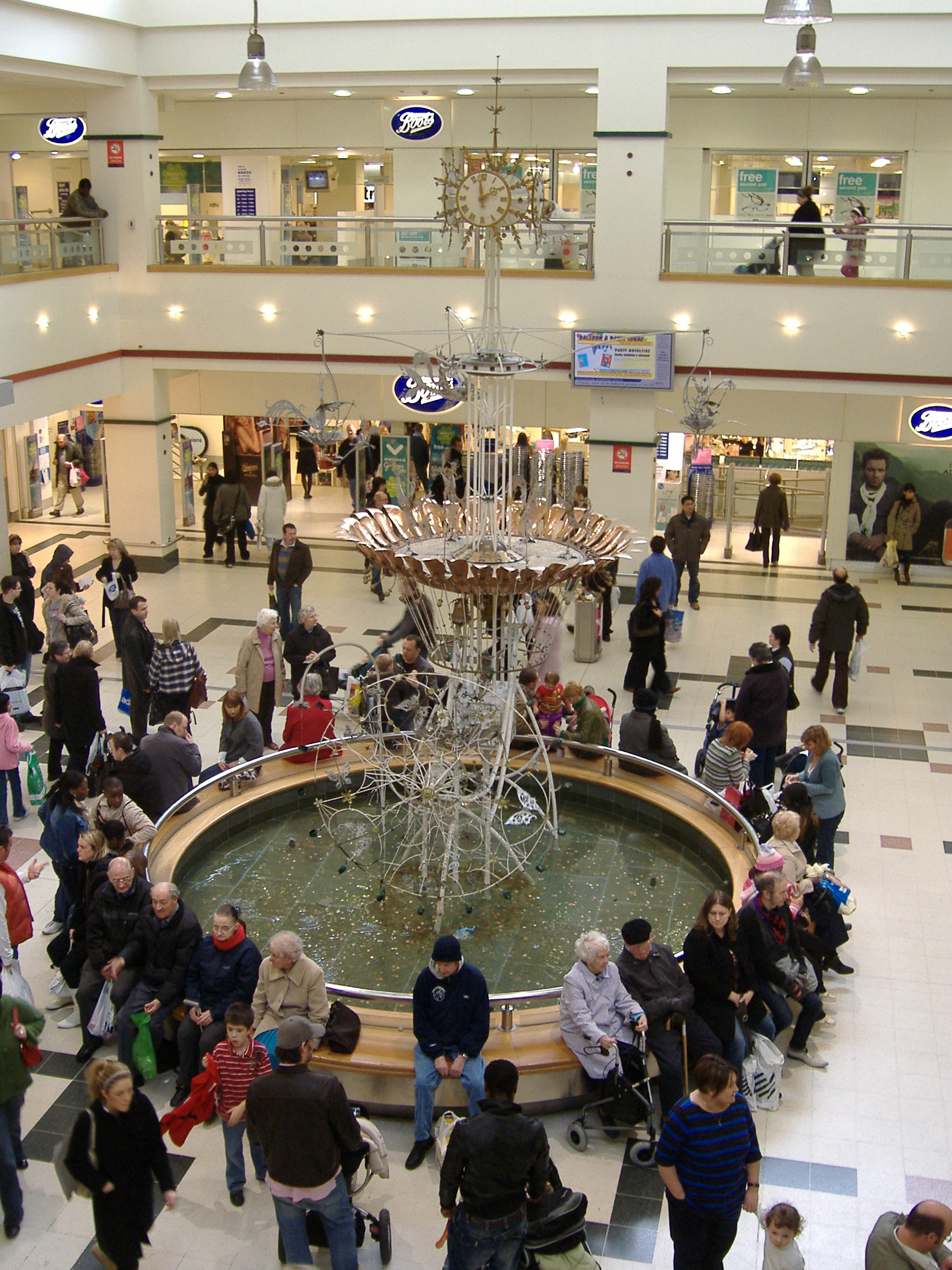
The Aqua Horological Tintinnabulator

The Aqua Horological Tintinnabulator (also known as the Victoria Centre Clock, Emett Clock, or The Time Fountain) is a 'water-powered' clock. From 1973 to 2014 it was installed on the ground floor at the Victoria Centre in Nottingham, England. In 2015 it was reinstalled in the shopping centre on the first floor. In May 2026, the clock was disassembled for complete renovation with an anticipated completion of approximately six months.

== History ==
It was commissioned by Capital and Counties in 1970 and designed and built by kinetic sculptor Rowland Emett. A photograph shows a pencilled note on a whitewashed beam in Emett's barn: 26th August 1970 (1/2 Closing Day) construction of the fountain started. Installation commenced late 1972 (the year the Victoria Centre opened) and was completed before 20 February 1973. The foundation stone reads THE VICTORIA CENTRE TIME FOUNTAIN FEBRUARY 20TH 1973 BY EMETT. In its original design, this clock played Rameau's Gigue en Rondeau II from the E-minor suite of his Pièces de Clavecin when striking the hour and half hour. The clock parts were designed by Thwaites & Reed.

It is 23ft high and has become an icon of Nottingham.

Between its installation in 1973 and 2010, an estimated equivalent of £250,000 in coins had been thrown into the fountain.

=== 2011 Refurbishment ===
In November 2011, local Chartered Engineer Pete Dexter contacted the Centre management to ask why the clock appeared to be defunct. He was allowed to investigate, leading to his design and build of a new electrical control system for the animation. He also re-instated the original music, replacing an audio cassette tape system with one based on an audio CD. In February 2014, the clock was dismantled by Pete Dexter and technicians from intu Victoria Centre and taken to Croxall and other locations near Tamworth where Pete Dexter and the Rowland Emett Society carried out some initial refurbishment of the parts. In particular the frame was restored to its original configuration by adding many sections of tube, some of which were to raise the height by around 400mm. This height had been lost through two occasions where the legs buried in concrete had been sliced off to move the clock. The frame colour was restored to aircraft grey-green based on a paint chip discovered during dismantling. Pete Dexter designed and built a mechanical drive for the cobweb wheel, based on original photographs. The clock was assembled as a dry installation in Millennium Point, Birmingham. This formed part of a wider exhibition in Birmingham of the works of Rowland Emett. After around three months, it was dismantled and put back into storage until December 2014, when the parts were transported back to Nottingham. Between January and June 2015, Pete Dexter and staff at the Victoria Centre carried out significant further renovation. The clock was reassembled on the upper mall at the north end of the Victoria Centre and officially restarted on 17 June 2015 by Pete Dexter's granddaughter Emma Jaggers. It sits in a purpose-built GRP basin with a glass surround. Pete Dexter designed a new water system as part of the refurbishment, reinstating a circular fountain of twelve water jets, as had existed originally, with hand-crafted copper 'buds'.

=== 2026 Refurbishment ===
In May 2026 the clock was dismantled for refurbishment, and it was announced that the clock would return to its original home on the lower floor again once complete.

== Description ==
It is topped by four silver-white clock faces with gilded hands and numerals. The animated sculpture underneath consists of a sunflower with 36 copper petals, partially obscuring an orchestra of six 'jewelled' players; three squirrels and three birds. At fifteen-minute intervals, a bell strikes followed by a performance; the petals are lowered to reveal the players, the entire orchestra rotates and each player spins on its vertical axis. The music for harpsichord Gigue en Rondeau II plays for 75 seconds after which the petals are raised and the animation ceases. A two-metre diameter cobweb wheel carrying 'jewelled' butterflies and frogs rotates continuously during the daytime as does the 'Top Feature' which consists of three arms with 'jewelled' pendants: one is a flying fish ridden by a squirrel, the second is a squirrel pushing a pram with a bird's nest and birds above, the third is a peacock rowing a boat with a squirrel on the rudder. In the middle of the sculpture is a floral bouquet sitting on a large copper leaf, adorned by jewelled birds. The clock originally struck and performed on the hour and half hour but was modified at some point to perform every fifteen minutes. Motive power is provided by four 230 Volt AC Parvalux geared motors (cobweb wheel, Top Feature, petals and orchestra) and two 230 Volt AC Crouzet synchronous motors (going and strike trains). The bell solenoid is powered by 240 Volt DC pulses. Electrical control of the motors is via 12 Volt DC relays.
