= Victoria Centre =

Shopping centre and residential high rise in Nottingham city centre

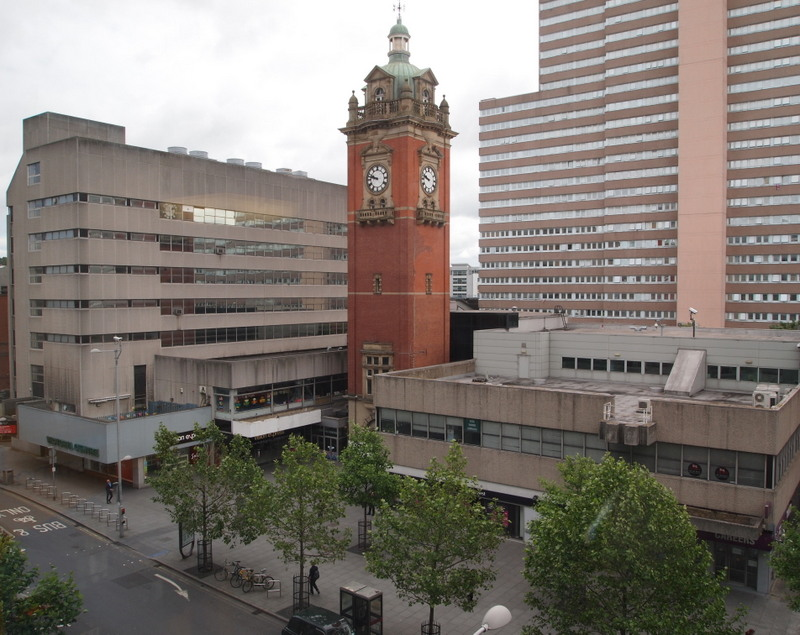
- The Victoria Centre and high rise apartments with incorporated clock tower from former Victoria rail station
- Coordinates: 52°57′23″N 1°8′50″W
- Opened: 1972
- Developer: Taylor Woodrow
- Owner: SGS UK Retail
- Num. of stores: 120
- Num. of anchor tenants: 4
- Floor area: 91,140 m^{2} (981,000 sq ft)
- Floors: 2
- Parking: 2,700
- Public transit: Nottingham Victoria bus station
- Website: Victoria Centre Nottingham

The Victoria Centre is a shopping centre and social housing complex in Nottingham, England, constructed by Taylor Woodrow between 1967 and 1972. It contains fashion and high street chain stores as well as cafes, restaurants, and the Victoria bus station.

== History ==
The Victoria Centre stands on the site of the old Nottingham Victoria railway station, which was demolished in 1967. The clock tower and the former Victoria Station Hotel (now run by Hilton Hotels) were the only parts of the old station to be retained. The tower, built between 1898 and 1900 as part of the Great Central Railway network, is grade II listed and measures 100 ft (30 m) high.

The complex, designed by Arthur Swift & Partners was constructed between 1967 and 1972 by Taylor Woodrow. The ground and first floor of the complex hold the Victoria Centre shopping centre, which is managed by Savills. The building itself is owned by a limited partnership between Shaftesbury Capital, Corporation Service Company, Global Mutual and Nottingham City Council. The complex remains the tallest building in Nottingham, with the 26 floor, 256 ft (78 m) high Victoria Centre Flats, which run north–south along their length in a number of blocks of different heights. There are 464 flats and 36,000 sq ft (3,300 m^{2}) of office space.

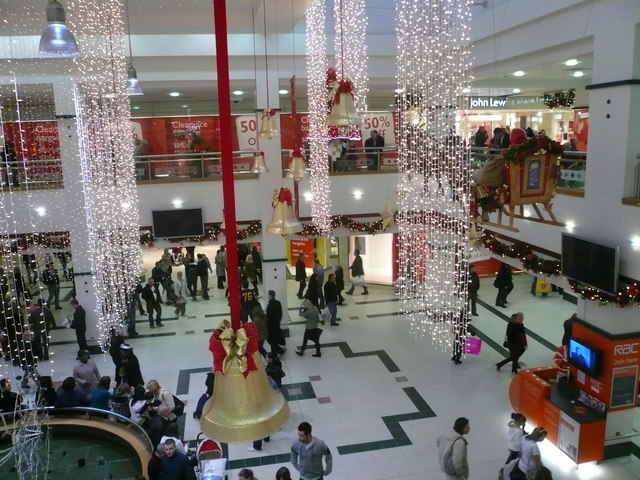
The Aqua Horological Tintinnabulator at Christmas in 2007

In 1970, the kinetic sculptor Rowland Emett was commissioned to design and build a "water-powered" clock known as The Aqua Horological Tintinnabulator. The clock was installed in late 1972 and chimed on the hour and half-hour, playing "Gigue en Rondeau II" (1724) from Rameau's "Pieces de Clavecin" Suite in E minor. This musical animated sculpture was originally located on the lower mall and was a popular meeting place. The clock was later modified to chime and play the music every fifteen minutes. In February 2014, the clock was dismantled and refurbished by engineer Pete Dexter and the Rowland Emett Society. It was reassembled for exhibition in Millennium Point, Birmingham, during the summer of 2014 before being dismantled again and stored until December 2014. The parts were then transported back to Nottingham, where Dexter and Intu Victoria Centre staff carried out further refurbishment work. It was reassembled in its new location, at the north end of the upper mall. Its stature, colour scheme, and most of its original water features were restored. It was officially restarted on 17 June 2015.

In 1985, the Food Court was opened on the lower mall. In the late 1980s the centre was refurbished accompanied by significant rebranding. During this refurbishment, the lower mall of the centre was organised into different courts, namely; 1) Emett court 2) Palm Court 3) Fountain court 4) Neon court 5) Food court

In 1997, the centre was extended to provide more retail space and allow the addition of a new anchor, House of Fraser. The rest of the centre was refurbished.

In 2010, it was announced that the Victoria Centre would be expanded to compete with Westfield's nearby Broadmarsh Centre and new centres in Derby and Leicester. In November 2011, Capital Shopping Centres purchased the Broadmarsh Centre. The purchase prompted an investigation by the Office of Fair Trading and the Competition Commission, which was concerned the company's monopoly over the city's shopping centres could negatively impact competition. Following the purchase, the owners wished to begin the planned development of the Victoria Centre, but Nottingham City Council insisted that Broadmarsh must be their "priority" and offered £50 million towards its redevelopment. The deputy leader of Nottingham City Council said the council would withhold planning permission for the development of the Victoria Centre until they "see bulldozers going into the Broadmarsh Centre".

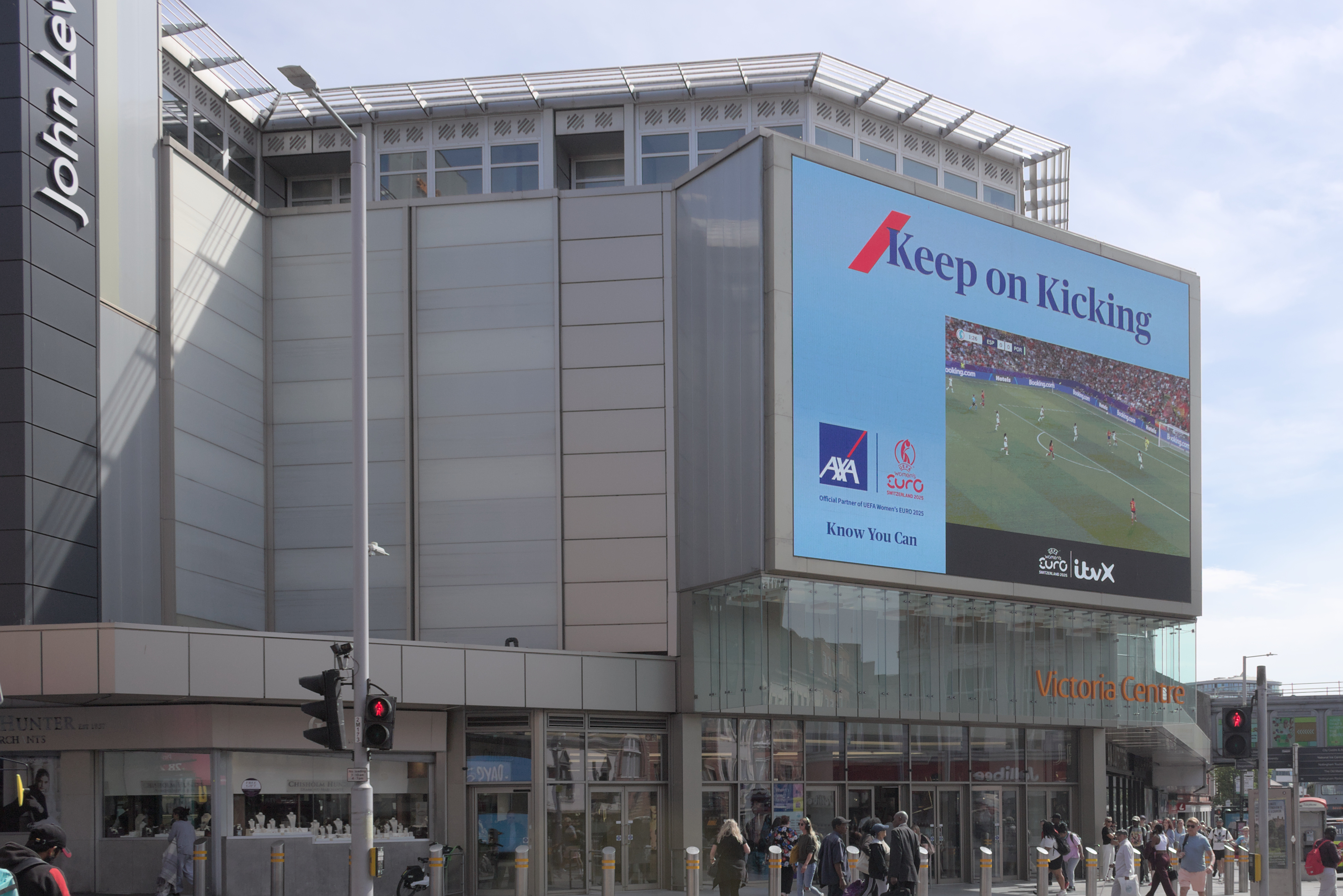
An entrance to Victoria Centre on Milton Street corner of Upper Parliament Street

In February 2013, the parent company, Capital Shopping Centres, changed its name to Intu. The centre was rebranded Intu Victoria Centre as part of the company's £25m nationwide rebrand.

In 2013, plans were revealed for the centre to be refurbished. The refurbishment began in February 2014 and was completed in summer 2015. It was undertaken by Laing O'Rourke and features a new restaurant quarter in the clock tower area and new lighting, flooring, entrances, and toilet facilities. This is the second refurbishment of the centre since the last major refurbishment in 1997. There are plans for an extension to the centre to increase floor space, but these will not be considered until plans for Intu Broadmarsh had been submitted.

Following Intu Properties plc entering administration in June 2020, a subsidiary of the company called Intu SGS received funding to take full control of the centre along with Lakeside, Braehead and Intu Watford. The transfer involved Global Mutual becoming asset manager of the centres and Savills serving as property manager. In November 2020, the centre's name reverted from intu Victoria Centre back to Victoria Centre.

== Victoria Centre Market ==
A market is situated on the premises, which opened in 1972 on both the lower and upper mall, opposite John Lewis, then known as Jessops. In 2008, the lower mall part of the market closed and is now fully located on the center's upper mall. It sold a range of goods, including fresh food, meat, and fish. There were also speciality stalls selling items such as books, jewellery, and haberdashery.

In 2008 it won the award for the Greenest Market in the Midlands from the National Market Traders Federation.

Nottingham City Council announced closure in December 2023, citing "falling customer numbers and increased costs" amongst their reasons, however as of 2026 it remains open with a limited number of stalls still trading.

== See also ==
- Nottingham Victoria bus station
- List of shopping centres in the United Kingdom
- Nottingham City Centre
- Broadmarsh
