= Jessop & Son =

Former department store in Nottingham

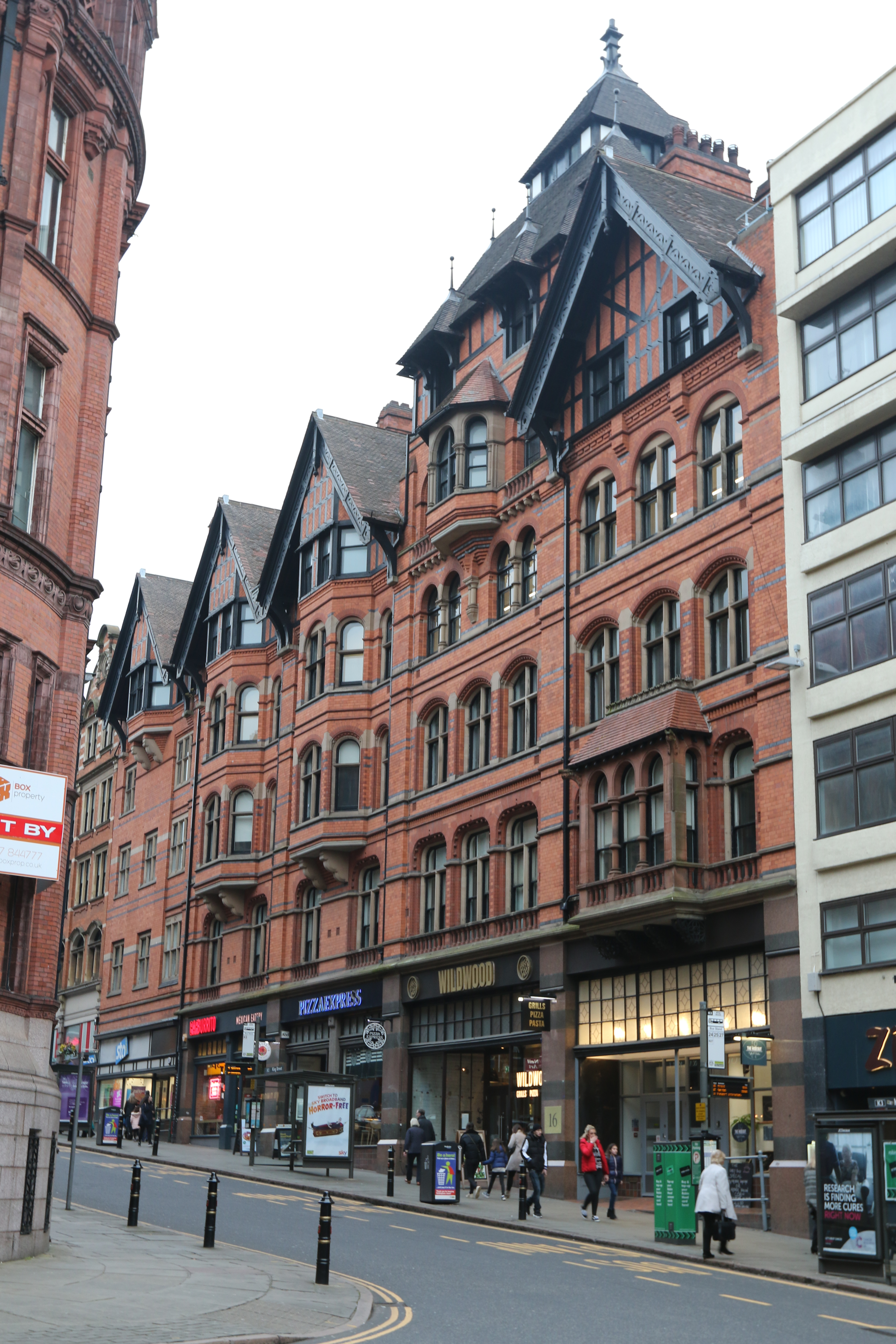
Former Jessop, Jessop & Son store on King Street, Nottingham, built to the designs of Watson Fothergill ca 1895

Jessop & Son was a department store, located in the English city of Nottingham, and often known as Jessops of Nottingham. It became part of the John Lewis Partnership, and the store was eventually rebranded to John Lewis & Partners.

== Early history ==
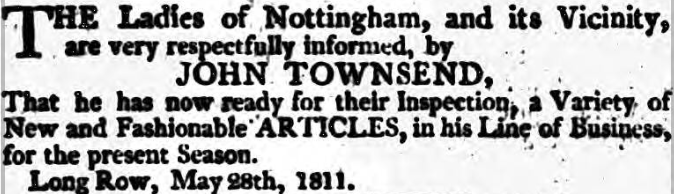
From the Nottingham Journal, 1 June 1811

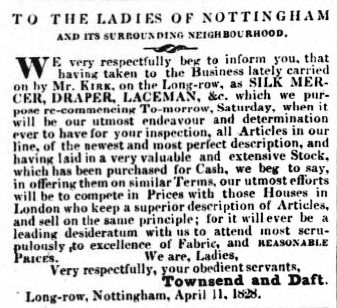
From the Nottingham Review and General Advertiser for the Midland Counties, 11 April 1828

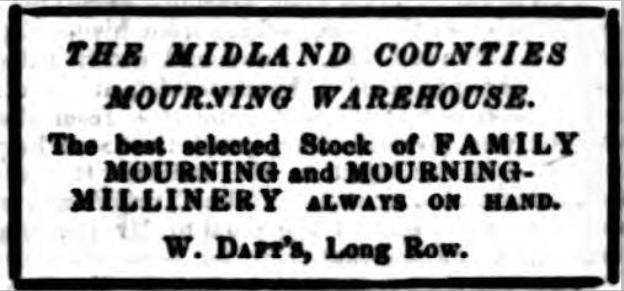
From the Nottingham Journal, 10 May 1850

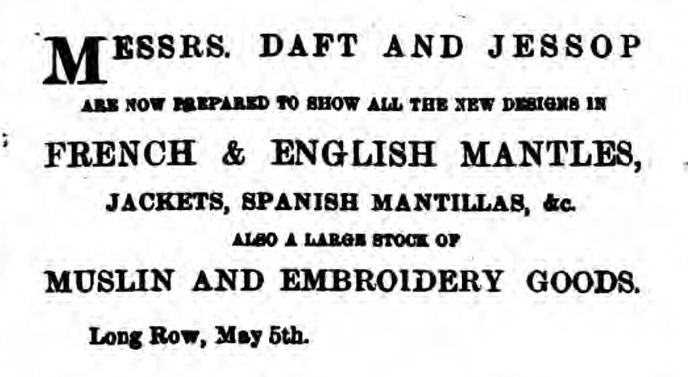
From the Nottinghamshire Guardian, 12 May 1859

Early history of how the store started is vague. It is believed that a store in Long Row, Nottingham was opened by a Mr John Townsend in October 1804 however records are lost from the period after. In 1828, Mr Townsend went into partnership with a William Daft, but when Mr Townsend left, a new partner joined in 1840 - Mr I. Kirk. This however only last three years and in 1859 Mr Daft went into partnership with Mr Zebedee Jessop. The business, known as the Midland Counties Mourning Warehouse, was run by both William Daft and Zebedee Jessop until 1866 when Mr Daft died, leaving Mr Jessop in sole charge.

In 1876 Zebedee Jessop took his son William on as a partner, and by 1897 when the store had outgrown its premises and with the lease expiring the store moved from Long Row to King Street. In 1907 Zebedee Jessop died and left his son William James Jessop in full control of the business. William was frequently in the headlines of local newspapers as he refused to accept the Shops Act 1912, which stated that shops must close a half day each week, ignoring the rule and paying the fines instead. William Jessop was also archaic in that 80% of trade was done on credit.

However the advent of the First World War changed the store. Out was tailoring, in came ready made clothes, Lifts, typewriters and motor vehicles all came in as the business modernised with the time. The store continued to grow purchasing further units along Kings Street, but in 1920 William Jessop died and the growth of the business stopped.

== Enter John Lewis ==
At the death of William Jessop the business had a turnover of £145,800 (equivalent to £5,634,200 in 2025). When John Lewis bought Jessop & Son in 1933, the turnover had fallen to £58,598 (equivalent to £3,626,000 in 2025). Jessops had become the first of the business' new provincial stores, which would grow over the next few decades, and by the first year being in charge the business had seen turnover rise by 30%.

The Second World War passed with only an oil bomb gutting the carpet and soft furnishing departments. After the war the business continued to grow, and by 1953 the business had seen profits grow 12 and a half times under the ownership of John Lewis. In 1962 a further 29,000 square foot of space was added to the store along with a re-fit of the store.

The business had continued to grow during the 1960s, so a decision was made to relocate the store to the newly developed Victoria Centre. This was the first John Lewis store constructed as part of a shopping centre, and the move took place in November 1972. A sign of the business growth was that at the start of 1972 Jessops had reported a turnover of £4 million (equivalent to £47,380,000 in 2025).

During the 2000s the store was rebranded, as part of a national exercise, to John Lewis, and subsequently to John Lewis & Partners.
