= Mid-America Science Museum =

- Established: 1979
- Location: 500 Mid America Blvd; Hot Springs, Arkansas
- Coordinates: 34.5148°N 93.1163°W
- Type: Science museum
- Website: midamericamuseum.org

The Mid-America Science Museum is located in Hot Springs, Arkansas. It has more than 100 hands-on traveling and permanent exhibits. Many permanent exhibits were built in the early 1980s.

Several of Rowland Emett's "things" (kinetic sculptures) are at the museum, including The Featherstone-Kite Openwork Basketweave Mark Two Gentleman's Flying Machine, and several that appear in the film Chitty Chitty Bang Bang as inventions of the character Caractacus Potts.

One of the museum's permanent exhibits is the powerful conical Tesla coil, which can produce 1.5 million volts of electricity.

The museum's building was originally completed in 1982 and designed by architects E. Verner Johnson & Associates of Boston and Stuck Frier Lane Scott Beisner of Jonesboro.

== Access ==
The museum is built on a wooded park some 6.5 miles west of downtown Hot Springs. It is located on Mid-America Boulevard, off Arkansas Highway 227.

== Renovation ==
In November 2011 the museum was awarded a $7.8 million capital grant from the Donald W. Reynolds Foundation for renovation of the building and exhibits. The museum was required to raise a $1.6 million match before receiving the grant. The museum re-opened on March 7, 2015, and contains 75 new exhibits and interactive artworks installed by creators from the Exploratorium's Global Studios team. Many of its original permanent exhibits were refurbished during the renovation process.

A major donation by the Oaklawn Foundation in 2013 allowed the museum to meet its fundraising goal before the deadline set by the Reynolds foundation. This donation provided the state-of-the-art Oaklawn Foundation Digital Digital Dome Theater, the digital software of which was installed by Sky-Skan. Seating up to 50 people, the Digital Dome has surround sound, a 180-degree screen for viewing the night sky, and programming to educate children and adults about the science and history of space exploration.

WDD Architects designed and built the Bob Wheeler Science Sky-walk that connects the museum to the surrounding outdoors. 32-feet high with hands-on exhibits, the structure provides a one-of-a-kind outdoor experience for guests visiting Mid-America Science Museum and was sponsored by the Hot Springs Advertising and Promotions Commission.
