= Knight & Lee =

Former department store in Southsea, England

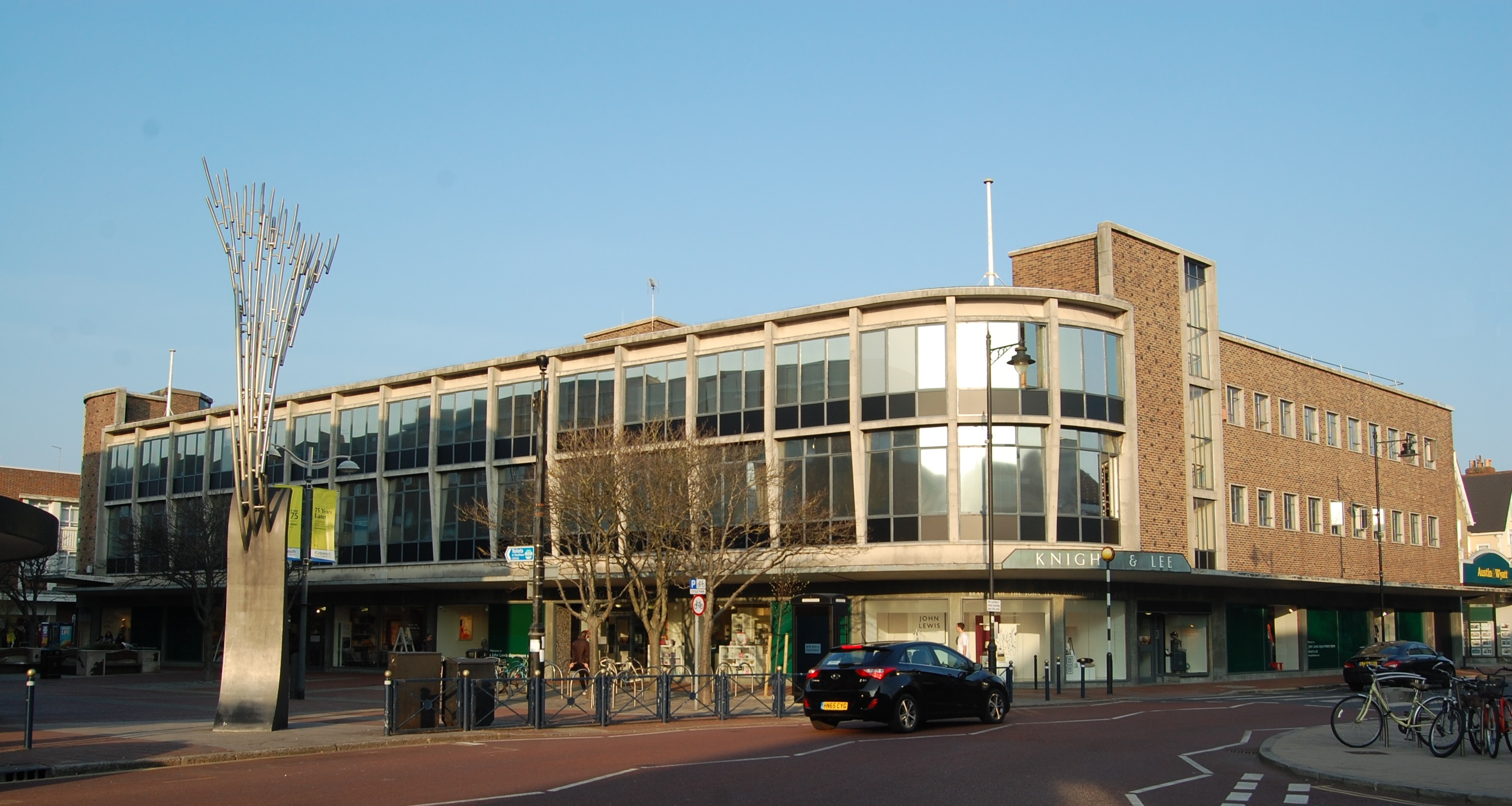
- Interactive map of Knight & Lee

General information
- Type: department store
- Location: Southsea, Hampshire, England
- Coordinates: 50.7850°N 1.0883°W

Knight & Lee was a department store in Southsea, Hampshire, England. The store was acquired by the John Lewis Partnership in 1933 and became the only provincial department store in the group not to trade under the John Lewis & Partners name. The shop officially closed on 13 July 2019. The proceeds from the sale of the freehold would be used to bring down the group's pension fund deficit.

== Pre-partnership history ==
The store was originally a lace business operated by Mr William Wink in Queen Street, Portsmouth. In 1857 William Wink died and his wife took over the business, listed at the time as 'lace manufacturer, milliner and dressmaker'. By 1865 Frederick Wink had taken over the business.

Frederick moved the business to the more fashionable Palmerston Road in Southsea in 1874. The business expanded with the purchase of further premises in Palmerston Road and increased its offering to become a department store.

In 1887 brothers-in-law Jesse Knight and Edward Herbert Soden Lee purchased the business. They had previously worked for William Whiteley in Bayswater, and brought a Mr Brown with them as General Manager. The business was greatly expanded by a novel boyswear department which was followed by a menswear department. In 1899 the business was incorporated.

In 1908 they purchased a former fishmonger's on the corner of Stanley Lane and Palmerston Road. This was eventually joined by further purchases along Palmerston Road that joined the premises together, with the buildings being rebuilt in 1910. In 1922 Mr Knight died, with Mr Lee dying two years later. Mr Brown, who had joined the business from Whiteleys when Knight and Lee had started out, ran the store until the John Lewis Partnership bought the business in 1933.

== After John Lewis purchase ==
By 1937 John Lewis were announcing that Knight & Lee had increased its turnover to £100,000.

World War II brought sustained bombing to Portsmouth and devastation to the Southsea shopping district of Palmerston Road. Knight & Lee was hit in an air raid in 1940 but was re-opened. The store was then completely destroyed by an incendiary bomb on 10 January 1941. The business recovered, however, relocating to a variety of premises close to the site of the derelict department store. Offices were located in the nearby Queen's Hotel and premises in Palmerston Arcade were opened for trade by 24 February. By 1950 the business had expanded into larger premises next to Palmerston Arcade, with an additional site trading in Elm Grove. In 1955 it was announced that a new purpose-built department store was to be constructed on the corner of Palmerston Road. The store opened in 1959 with all bar the boyswear and menswear departments operating in the new premises.

In 2004 the business in Southsea was under threat as John Lewis had agreed to become an anchor store for the new Portsmouth Northern Quarter development. The development was put on hold by Portsmouth City Council in 2005. When the scheme was resurrected by developers in 2014 John Lewis did not recommit to the scheme and locals became concerned that Knight & Lee would close. The John Lewis Partnership announced in response to rumours of closure that Knight & Lee would be staying in Southsea.

In 2018, the freehold of the building was sold by the John Lewis Partnership and on 23 January 2019 it was announced that the store would close.

In July 2019, Knight & Lee closed after trading for more than 150 years. At the time of closure the store was one of only two department stores in the John Lewis group to retain the trading name used before acquisition. After the closure of Caleys it had become the smallest of the Partnership's full-line department stores.
