= Bonds of Norwich =

Former department store in Norwich

- Company type: Private company
- Industry: Retail
- Genre: Department store
- Founded: 1879
- Fate: Purchased by John Lewis in 1982, rebranded as John Lewis in 2001
- Headquarters: Norwich
- Parent: John Lewis
- Subsidiaries: Greens, Haymarket, Norwich; Clutten, East Dereham

Bonds of Norwich was a department store founded in 1879, which was based in All Saints Green, Norwich, England. The business grew during the 1950s by purchasing other retailers in Haymarket and East Dereham. During the 1970s the company struggled, culminating with John Lewis Partnership purchasing the business in 1982. The store was renamed John Lewis in 2001.

== Early history ==
Bonds was established in February 1879 by Robert Herne Bond when he took over Woodlands drapery shop at the end of Ber Street. Robert was the son of a farmer, but first started working as a grocer in London, before learning the drapery trade with his brother James in Chelmsford. Bonds in Chelmsford would become a department store in its own right and was bought by Debenhams prior to the Second World War.

The drapery business was very competitive with nearly 90 businesses in Norwich alone. To get noticed Robert Bond advertised on the front of the Norwich Mercury newspaper a Grand Sale, selling the stock of the previous owners at heavily discounted prices. In 1881, Robert and his wife Mary were living above the premises with five of their staff, including a millinery assistant who helped Mary Bond set up Department No 1. The business expanded buying up two of the adjacent properties soreading into Bridge Street by 1896, and by 1903 Robert's two sons William and Ernest joined the business. The company name was changed to R H Bond & Sons. The third son James Owen Bond became an architect – his firm The Owen Bond Partnership exists today and designed the 1938 store extension.

== Twentieth century ==
In 1924, Robert Bond died. He was succeeded as chairman by William. The store was rebuilt with frontages on Ber Street and All Saints Green, with an arcade running in between in 1914. In the 1930s the store expanded by buying the Thatched Cinema on All Saints Green and using it as a restaurant and offices.

In 1938 23-25 All Saints Green became available, and a new extension was added. However, the buildings were damaged during the war with the Thatched Cinema being burned down. The store continued by using empty properties in Norwich.

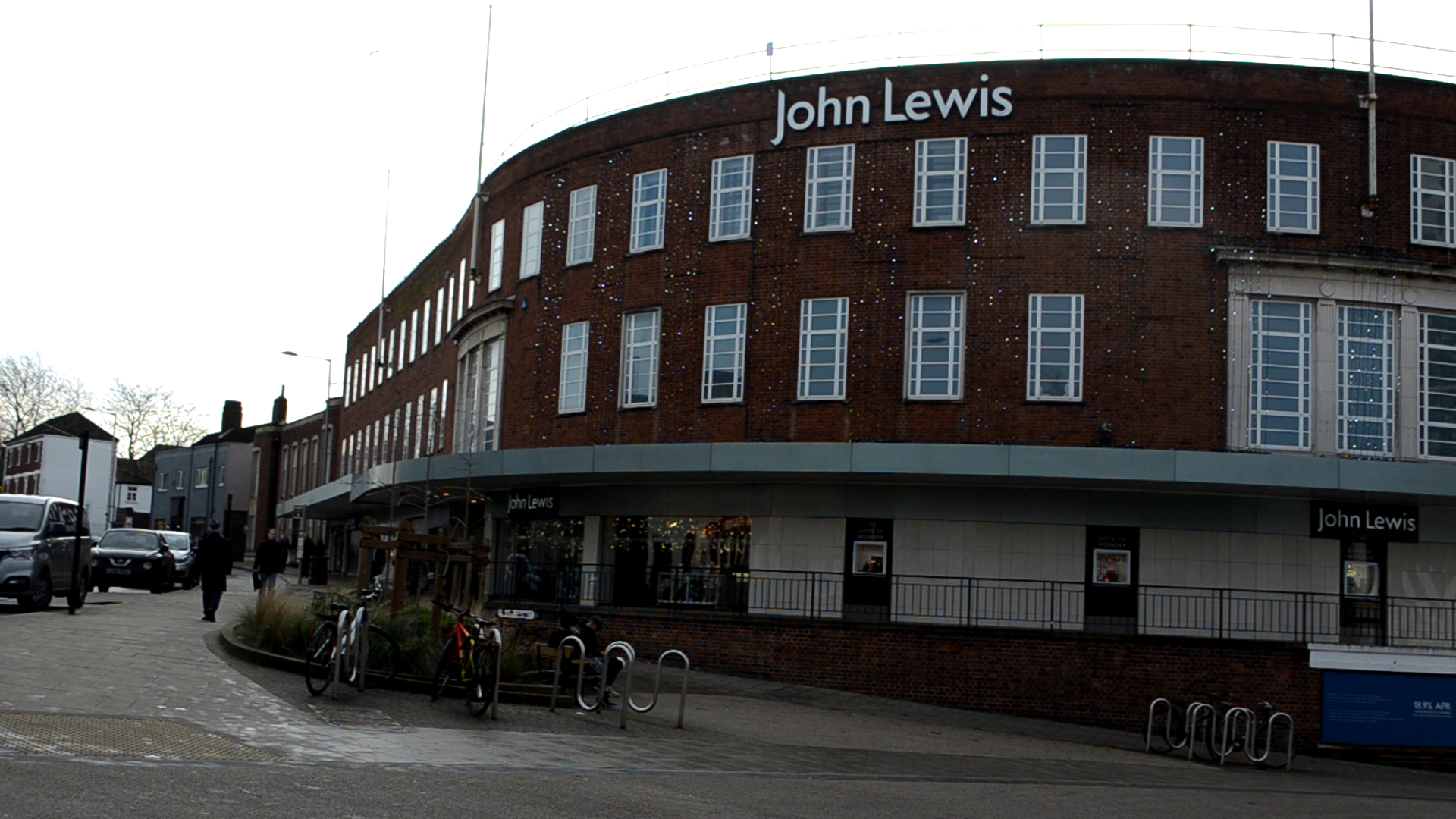
The former Bonds store as a John Lewis today.

The store was almost completely burnt down in the Baedeker Blitz on 27 and 28 April 1942. Then owner, Ernest Bond, was in business again within three days of the bombing, selling what he could salvage from his damaged stock. He took possession of a fleet of damaged and disused buses using them as shops. They were put in the store's car park where they also set up a makeshift restaurant in an old corrugated iron building. In 1948, Bonds became one of the 20 founding members of the Associated Independent Stores buying group.

After the war, Robert Owen Bond, working in his fathers Owen Bond practice designed the new store which was completed in 1951. The business grew after the war, buying Norwich outfitters Greens in Haymarket, and Cluttens in East Dereham. Greens would be closed in 1960 and the building was demolished.

During the 1970s, however, trade steadily deteriorated. Chief Executive, Nicholas Hinde, left the business in 1979, taking the East Dereham store. A modernisation project and the addition of a further 14,000 square feet of selling space was completed in the same year in an attempt to turn the business around.

In March 1979, a dinner was held at St Andrew's Hall to celebrate 100 years of the stores establishment. Changes at the Norwich store had failed to arrest the decline in the company's fortunes with operating losses since 1978. This culminated in the sale of the company in 1982 to The John Lewis Partnership, who bought the business for a fee reportedly to be £1 million.

The store continued to trade as Bonds until 2001 when the John Lewis name was adopted.
