= John Lewis & Partners =

British department store chain

Coordinates: 51.497°N 0.14434°W

John Lewis plc

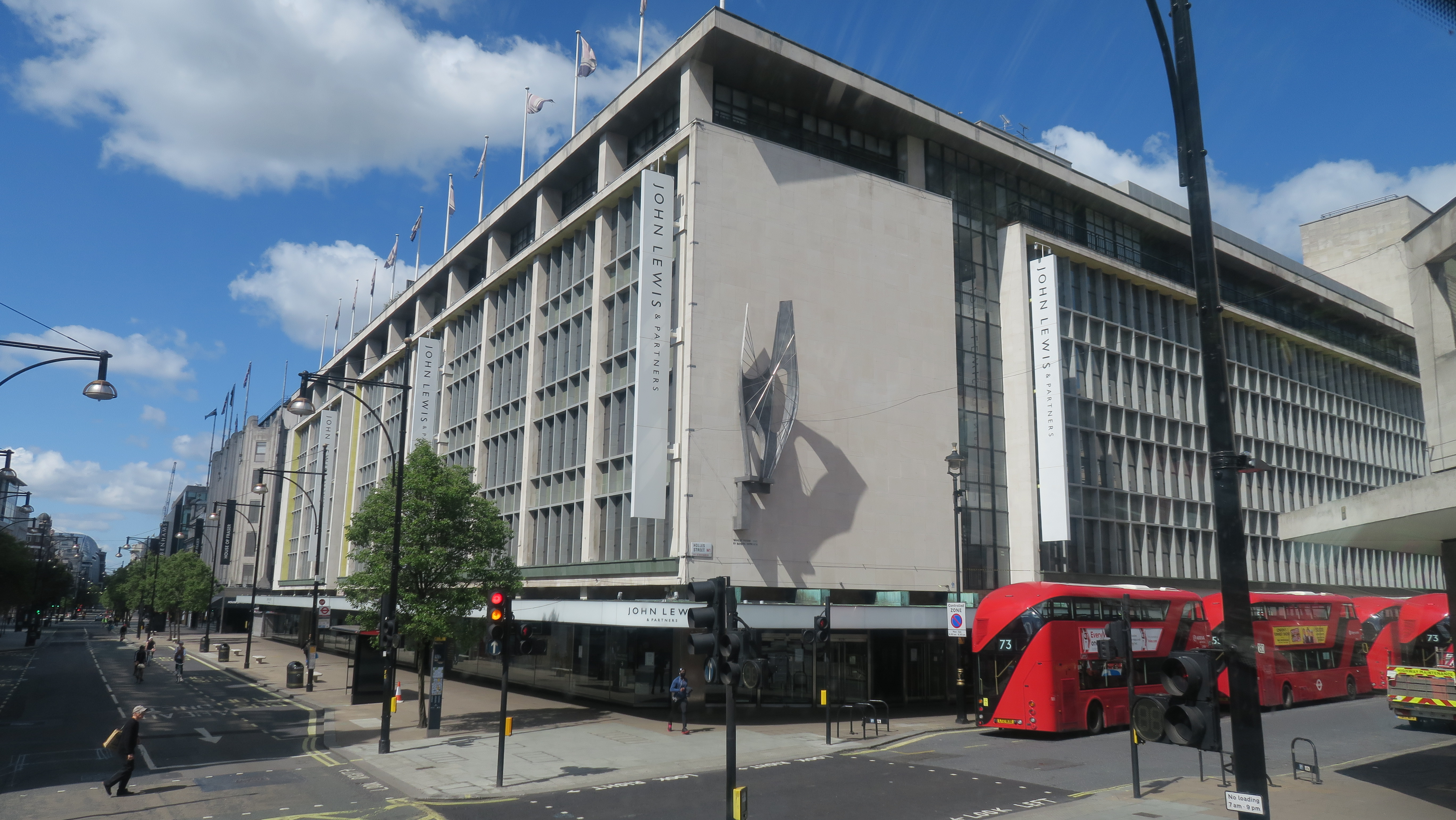
- Exterior of the John Lewis & Partners flagship store on Oxford Street in London (2020)
- Trade name: John Lewis & Partners
- Formerly: John Lewis and Company Limited (1928–1982)
- Type: Subsidiary
- Industry: Retail
- Genre: Department stores
- Founded: 1864; 162 years ago in London, England
- Founder: John Lewis
- Number of locations: 52 (Note: Store count includes 35 department stores, 12 John Lewis at Home locations, and one Swindon Home Outlet location.)
- Area served: United Kingdom
- Key people: Jason Tarry (chairman); Peter Ruis (Managing director); Andy Mounsey (executive director, finance)
- Revenue: ▲£3.78 billion (2017)
- Operating income: ▼£243.2 million (2017)
- Number of employees: 38,100 (2017)
- Parent: John Lewis Partnership
- Website: johnlewis.com

John Lewis plc (trading as John Lewis & Partners) is a British department store chain founded by John Lewis in 1864. It is part of the John Lewis Partnership plc, a holding company held in a trust on behalf of its employees as the beneficiaries of the trust. The brand was established in 1929 by Spedan Lewis, son of the founder, John Lewis.

The first John Lewis store opened in 1864 on Oxford Street, London. As of 2023, there are 35 stores throughout Great Britain. From 1925 to 2022, John Lewis had a policy known as "Never Knowingly Undersold," which promised to match or beat lower prices offered by national high street competitors.

The Oxford Street store received a Royal Warrant in 2008 from Queen Elizabeth II as "suppliers of haberdashery and household goods." The Reading store was awarded a Royal Warrant in 2007 as "suppliers of household and fancy goods."

The John Lewis Christmas television advert, first launched in 2007, has become an annual tradition in British culture, marking the start of the Christmas season.

The company has been a member of the International Association of Department Stores from 2004 to 2010, and rejoined in 2025.

== 20th-century history ==
=== First half ===
The flagship store on Oxford Street began as a drapery shop, opened by John Lewis in 1864. In 1905 Lewis acquired a second store, Peter Jones in Sloane Square, London. His eldest son, John Spedan Lewis, began the John Lewis Partnership in 1920 after thinking up the idea during his days in charge of Peter Jones. John Spedan Lewis also thought up the idea of the Gazette, the partnership's in-house magazine, first published in 1918.

In 1933, the partnership purchased its first store outside London, the long-established Jessop & Son in Nottingham. Jessops only rebranded itself as John Lewis on 27 October 2002. In 1940 the partnership bought Selfridge Provincial Stores. This group of sixteen suburban and provincial department stores included Cole Brothers, Sheffield; George Henry Lee, Liverpool; Robert Sayle, Cambridge; and Trewin Brothers, Watford; some of which continue to trade today but are now re-branded as John Lewis & Partners.

In 1937, grocery company Waitrose, consisting of ten shops and 160 employees, was taken over by John Lewis, and today operates as its supermarket arm.

In 1949, it was reported that London branches included Peter Jones, John Barnes (now a branch of Waitrose & Partners), John Pound and Bon Marche. The "provincial branches" were Robert Sayle, of Cambridge and Peterborough, Tyrrell & Green, of Southampton and Lance & Lance of Weston-super-Mare. They also had "silk shops" at Edinburgh, Hull and Newcastle upon Tyne.

=== Second half ===
In 1953, the Reading department store Heelas became part of the John Lewis group, retaining its original name until 2001 when it adopted the John Lewis name. Also in 1953, the partnership bought Herbert Parkinson, a textile manufacturer, a business which still makes duvets, pillows and furnishings for John Lewis.

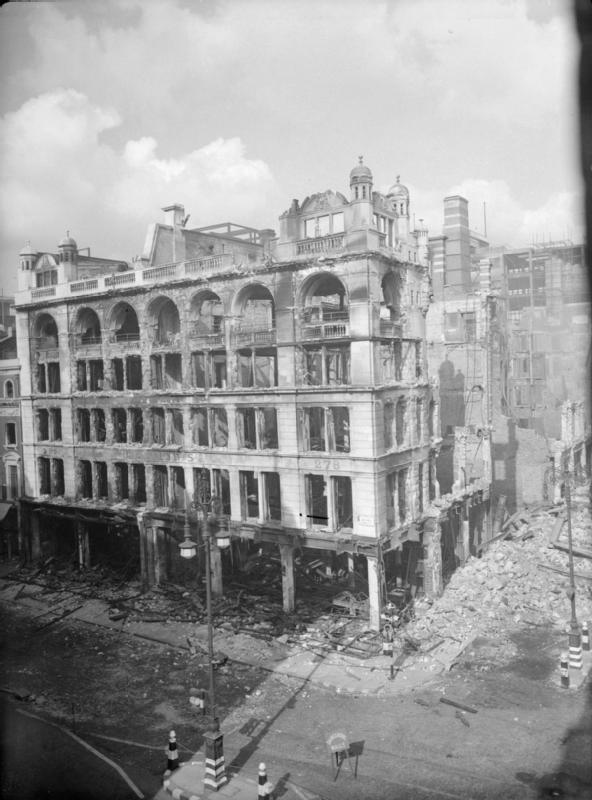
John Lewis Oxford Street store damaged during The Blitz, 1940

The first John Lewis store constructed as part of a shopping centre was the relocated Jessops, in Nottingham, which has been in the Victoria Centre since it opened in 1972. The announcement of an anchor tenant such as John Lewis contributes to the certainty of developers' proposals, and so attracts other retailers to the area.

In 1992, John Lewis was once again bombed, this time by IRA members. The nearby Cavendish square was also bombed at the same time.

Before the relaxation of UK Sunday trading laws in 1994, John Lewis stores closed on Mondays to allow staff a full two-day "weekend".

The John Lewis Partnership was the first department store group in the UK to adopt central buying, launching the 'Jonell(e)' name for own-brand merchandise in 1937. That brand name has gradually been replaced with the 'John Lewis' name since 2001. Additional own brands include Collection by John Lewis as well as John Lewis & Co. and Collection Weekend by John Lewis. Several Waitrose own-brand products, such as cleaning materials and party stationery, are also available from John Lewis.

== 21st-century history ==
=== 2000s ===
Many stores acquired by John Lewis & Partners retained their original names for many years, including Tyrrell & Green in Southampton until 2000, Bonds of Norwich until 2001, Trewins in Watford until 2001, Jessop & Son in Nottingham until 2002, Bainbridge's in Newcastle-upon-Tyne until 2002, and Cole Brothers in Sheffield until 2002. All have now been rebranded John Lewis, with the exception of Peter Jones in south west London and Knight & Lee in Southsea which was closed in 2019.

Investment has been made across the group in the twenty-first century. This has included the renovation of Peter Jones at a cost of £107 million, completed in 2004. The original Oxford Street John Lewis shop is still the flagship and largest branch in the partnership. A complete refurbishment of the building was completed in late 2007 at a cost of £60 million. This introduced the new Place To Eat restaurant and a brasserie and bistro in the store. A John Lewis Food Hall from Waitrose opened in the shop's basement on 3 October 2007. A second Food Hall opened at the John Lewis Bluewater store on 6 August 2009.

In June 2004 John Lewis announced plans to open its first store in Northern Ireland at the Sprucefield Park development, the province's largest out-of-town retail park, located outside Lisburn and 10 miles (16 km) from Belfast. The application was approved in June 2005 and the opening of the new store was scheduled for 2008. This decision was disputed and was taken to the High Court, where it was reversed.

Plans were circulating since the early 2000s for a new large store in Sheffield to replace the current store. The new store was to be included within the Sevenstone development, which has since been cancelled. A new store was to be considered for construction as part of the Sheffield Retail Quarter, scheduled to be completed by 2022. As of August 2017 these plans had not been confirmed and more recently, it was announced that the Sheffield John Lewis would close because of the impact of the coronavirus pandemic.

In 2008 a controversy over the declaration of expenses by UK members of Parliament revealed that Parliamentary authorities were using information from the "John Lewis list" as a guide to the maximum costs refundable to MPs when equipping London pieds à terre at public expense.

On 6 November 2008 it was announced that John Lewis would open their first department store outside the UK in Dublin, Ireland. Subject to planning permission, the shop would be built on O'Connell Street. The centre was being developed by Chartered Land and would be part of the largest retail centre in Ireland. As of January 2014 the €1.2 billion development was on hold and John Lewis were still seeking a location in Northern Ireland for a flagship department store.

The Cardiff store opened in September 2009 as part of the Phase 2 development of St David's Centre. The Cardiff branch is the Partnership's only department store in Wales.

=== 2010s ===
Stratford opened in 2011 together with a new Waitrose supermarket. The new shops would anchor the Westfield Stratford City development alongside the Olympic Park in east London. In February 2011 it was announced that John Lewis was appointed as the Official Department Store provider for the London 2012 Olympic Games. As part of the deal, John Lewis stores became key retail outlets for official London 2012 merchandise.

Also in February 2011 John Lewis announced it was to open a 250,000-square-foot (23,000 m^{2}) department store in Birmingham city centre in 2014. The completion date of 2014 was pushed back to autumn 2015 due to complications regarding the construction of the centre, including issues relating to car parks and taxi ranks. Grand Central leasing director Keith Stone said the date was pushed back to ensure a better customer experience. The store opened on 24 September 2015 and was the flagship store for the £100 million development and part of the new Grand Central shopping centre built on the south side of a redeveloped Birmingham New Street railway station.

In July 2011 John Lewis announced that it would be opening 10 new stores under a new smaller format in city centre locations over the next five years. The new smaller format department stores would hold John Lewis's core lines of Home, Electrical and Fashions, all tailored to the local area. However, the full range would still be available through online terminals within the store, as well as the "click and collect" service already available within other branches. With the first branch opening in Exeter on 12 October 2012, Andrea O'Donnell, commercial director, said the move would help John Lewis double its turnover from £3bn ($4.89bn) to £6bn over the next 10 years.

In November 2011 it was announced that John Lewis had shelved plans for a new store in Preston, Lancashire as part of the Tithebarn Project. The economic climate was cited as a key factor in their decision.

It was announced that John Lewis would be the anchor tenant of a new development scheme in Leeds. The Eastgate Quarters scheme was approved in July 2011. The site, since renamed Victoria Gate, guides shoppers from central Leeds to John Lewis via a luxury arcade continuing (over Vicar Lane) from the existing Victoria Quarter. John Lewis had been looking for a site in Leeds for a while, even considering the Headingley cricket ground, and were happy they are at long last filling a major regional gap. The facade of the Leeds department store references the diagonal lines of the John Lewis motif.

In 2014 John Lewis announced its intention to anchor a £1bn extension of the Westfield London shopping centre in Shepherd's Bush, west London. The store number 50 opened in March 2018.

In September 2015 John Lewis purchased 129–133 North Street in Brighton, a building occupied by Boots and other shops.

In September 2016, John Lewis unveiled its plans for the Brighton store which was expected to open in late 2018, but plans for the store were scrapped in May 2017. In November 2016 John Lewis initiated their internal resource-led "Project ā" to increase profitability across several product ranges. The project efforts were focused on their Baby & Child range. A new store in Cheltenham opened 2018 in the former Beechwood Shopping Centre.

On 4 September 2018 John Lewis underwent a major rebrand to become John Lewis & Partners. Waitrose underwent a similar rebrand. In October 2018 recruitment website Indeed named John Lewis & Partners as the UK's eighth best private sector employer, based on millions of employee ratings and reviews.

John Lewis started a trial in 2013 labelling the lifetime electricity costs of its household goods. John Lewis opened a store as the showpiece of the Bond Street retail development in the cathedral city of Chelmsford, Essex in 2016. In October 2017 the remodelled and extended Westgate Shopping Centre reopened in the medieval university city of Oxford, with a large John Lewis as the development's anchor store.

In 2018 John Lewis announced that its profits including Waitrose for the six months to 28 July dropped 99% from the previous year to £1.2m, and warned that full-year profits would be substantially lower. The company said that the drop was due to lower margins as "This year there has been twice as many extravaganza days as there were a year ago and actually the discounts have been even deeper" and "We're never knowingly undersold at John Lewis, so of course we are matching that, and that affects margins." Not being undersold was an "extremely valuable" promise. The drop in profits was reported to be "sparking concerns it could be the next high street retailer faced with closure", following the closure of many British retail chains.

=== 2020s ===
On 21 March 2020 John Lewis announced that it would temporarily close all its stores from 24 March due to the COVID-19 pandemic. It also announced a "significant" reduction of its £500 million planned investment for the year. Over 2,000 John Lewis staff were already temporarily working in Waitrose stores to cope with large grocery demands due to the coronavirus outbreak. On 9 July 2020, the company announced that they will be closing eight out of their fifty department stores, leaving 1,300 job positions at potential risk, and notably including its Birmingham store which had opened less than five years ago because of financial challenges associated with the store which had been ongoing for several years prior to the COVID-19 pandemic. On 24 March 2021, it announced that an additional eight stores would close. The pandemic has had a substantial impact on John Lewis, and in 2021 the company reported losses of £517 million for the previous year.

In February 2022 John Lewis announced that later in the year it would end its "never knowingly undersold" pledge to match prices on branded products from other national high street retailers. The policy began in 1925. The pledge, which does not apply to internet purchases, was said by the company's representatives to be becoming less relevant in an increasingly online market.

On 27 January 2024 John Lewis announced plans to cut up to 11,000 jobs over the next five years as part of a strategy to return the business to profitability. This decision, which includes redundancies and not filling vacant positions, comes amidst the company's financial difficulties.

On 5 September 2024 the retailer announced it was bringing back its "never knowingly undersold" price pledge, two years after abandoning it. On 12 September 2024 the retailer said its plans to revive the business are working after its losses over the first half of the year nearly halved.

In November 2024, the John Lewis Partnership confirmed plans to invest £800m in its namesake brand over the next four years. A large chunk of the money is to be spent on revitalising its stores.

In April 2026, it was announced that John Lewis is in a high court dispute with the owner of London’s Brent Cross shopping centre over claims it should pay for online sales collected in store on top of its annual turnover. John Lewis, in its defence, argues that any sales and charges related to click-and-collect purchases should not be included in the turnover as the transaction is completed when the order leaves the distribution centre as opposed to taking place in store.

== Store formats ==
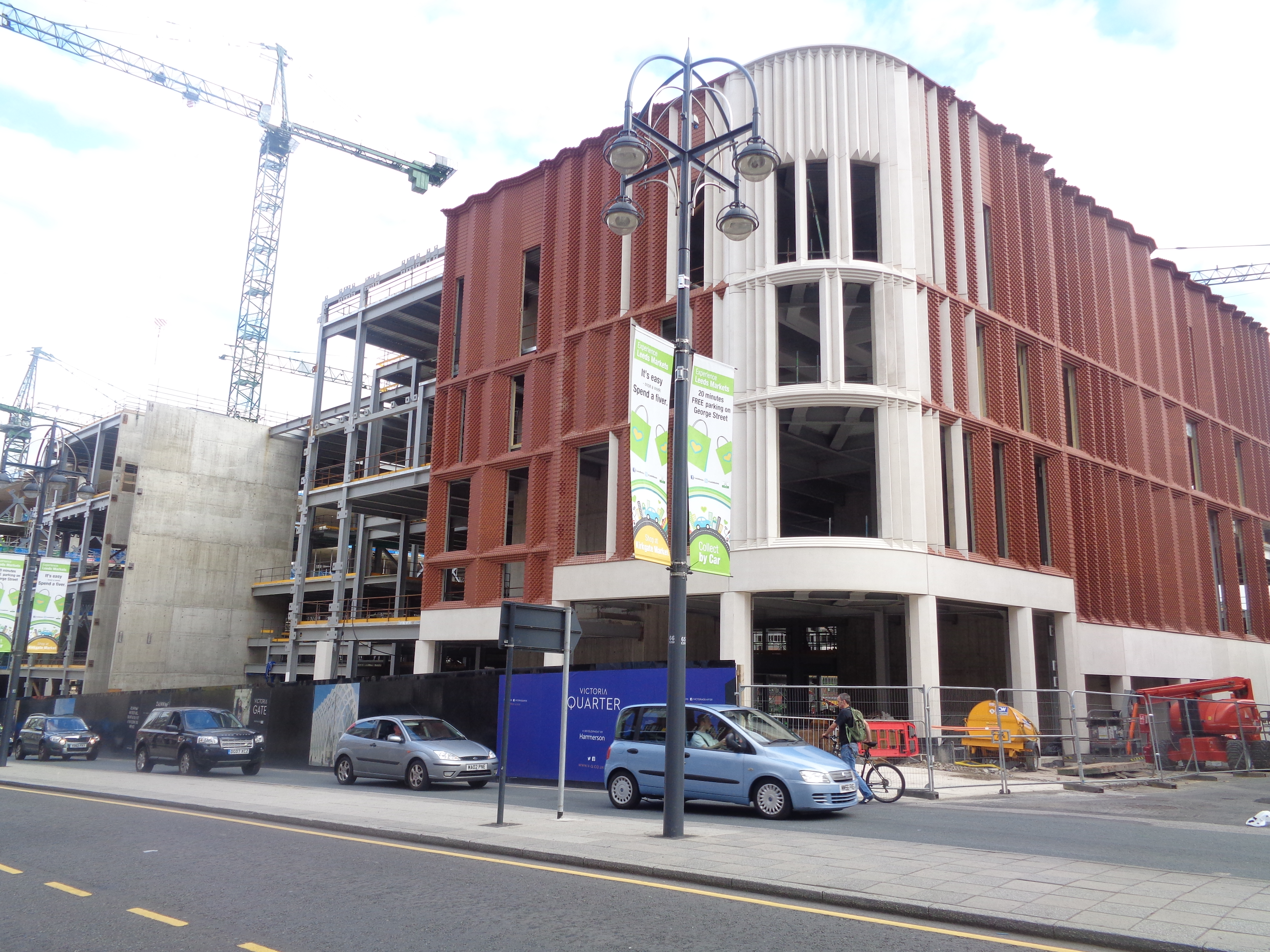
The first branch of John Lewis in Leeds (opened in October 2016) under construction in 2015

As of October 2018, the John Lewis Partnership operated 52 John Lewis stores throughout Great Britain. The Oxford Street store, originally opened in 1864 (rebuilt in 1953 following significant bomb damage in World War II), is the largest operated by the partnership. 35 of the stores are traditional department stores and 12 are 'John Lewis at home' stores.

Following the early success of the Poole "at home" store, five further "at homes" opened in 2010/11 in areas outside of the catchment of the traditional John Lewis stores, including Croydon, Tunbridge Wells, Tamworth, Chester and Swindon. Further stores in Newbury and Chichester, West Sussex, opened in the spring of 2012, with Ipswich following in November 2012. On Thursday 17 June 2015, a new John Lewis at home store opened in Horsham, West Sussex along with a branch of Waitrose that relocated from the town centre.

In the summer of 2014, John Lewis opened a small airside store in the newly rebuilt Terminal 2 at London Heathrow Airport.

It was announced on 9 July 2020 that the travel hubs, Heathrow and St Pancras, would not reopen after the first COVID-19 national lockdown.

== International expansions ==
In spring 2016, John Lewis homeware confirmed it planned to enter the Irish market with a concession based at Arnotts Dublin store on Henry Street. It opened in October 2016 with a limited number of John Lewis branded home furnishings. However, by late 2019 the John Lewis concession was reduced in size.

By February 2017, John Lewis had opened five shop-in-shop branches in Myer department stores in Australia. The merchandise focus is on homeware. "Manchester" (as bedding, linens and towels are called in Australia) is manufactured to Australian bed sizes. By 2020 all concessions inside Myer stores had been closed down.

== Brand identity ==
John Lewis graphic identity, 1990

The John Lewis logo between 2000 and 2018

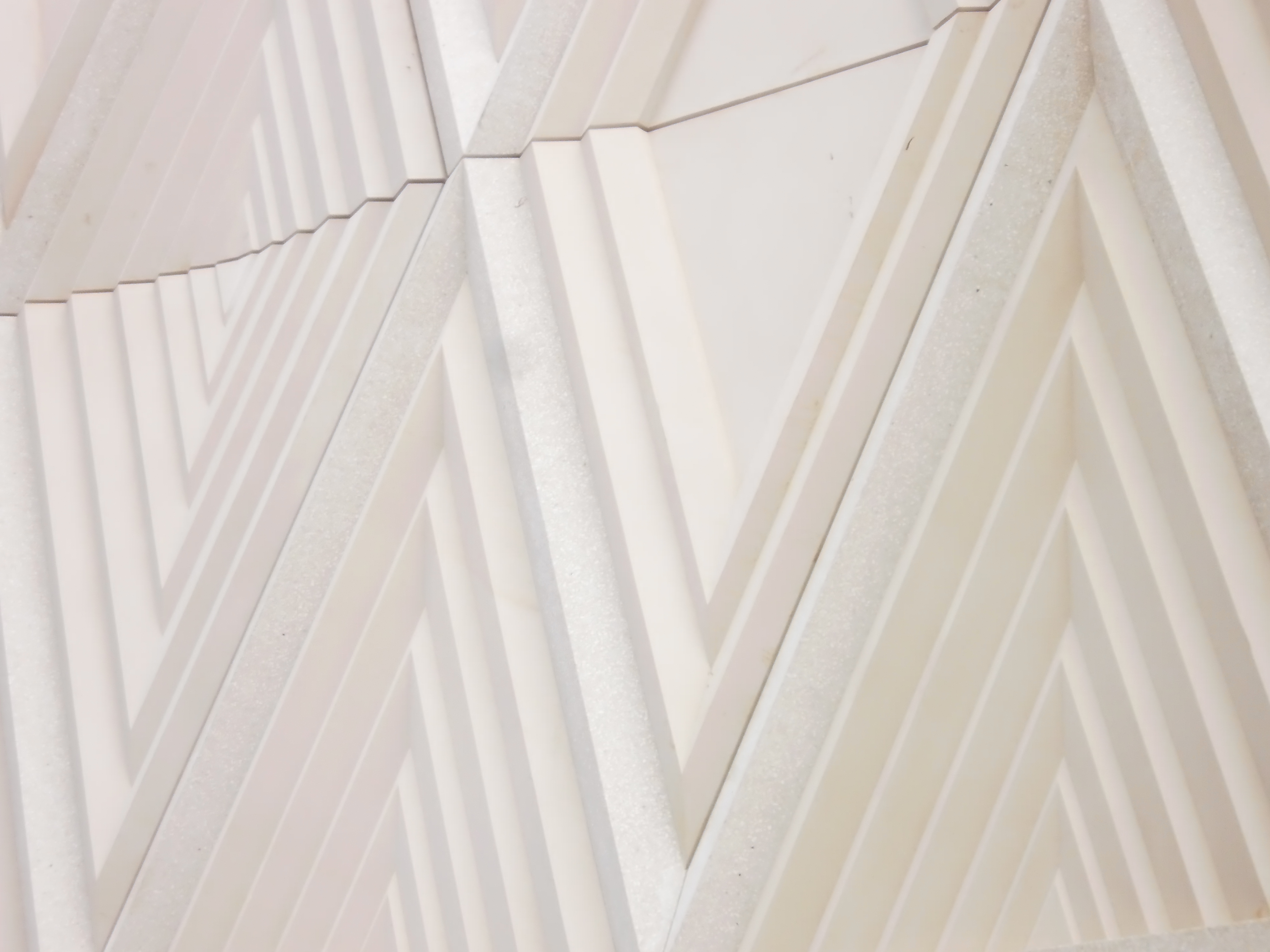
Lines at Leeds John Lewis

The graphic identity, which has at its core the distinctive diagonal motif, was created in 1990 by John Lloyd and Jim Northover of the British design consultancy Lloyd Northover. In 2000, it was given a minor refresh by London design consultancy Pentagram.

The line motif appears to be reflected in the façade of the Leeds store.

=== Christmas advertising ===
Since 2007, John Lewis has become known for producing memorable Christmas television adverts, which have gained heavy exposure on social media. Some of the more prominent campaigns are The Bear and the Hare, Monty's Christmas and Man on the Moon. The adverts, which typically rely on emotional content, have become something of an annual tradition in the UK and the music used in the campaigns has reached high positions in the UK Singles Chart.

=== Private-label brands ===
John Lewis sells goods under a variety of private label brand names.

- AND/OR
- John Lewis & Partners
- Kin
- Modern Rarity

== Gallery ==
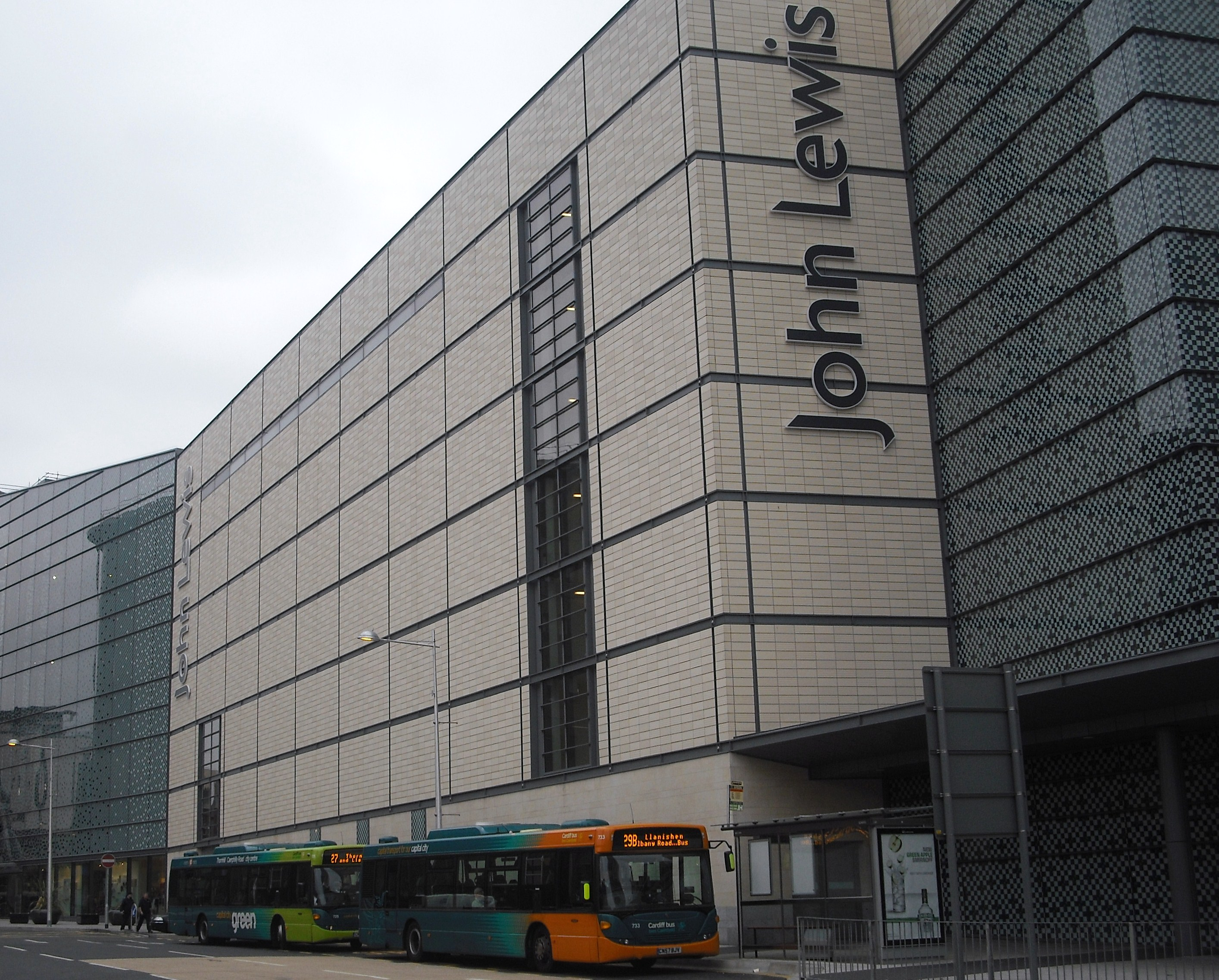
John Lewis store in Cardiff

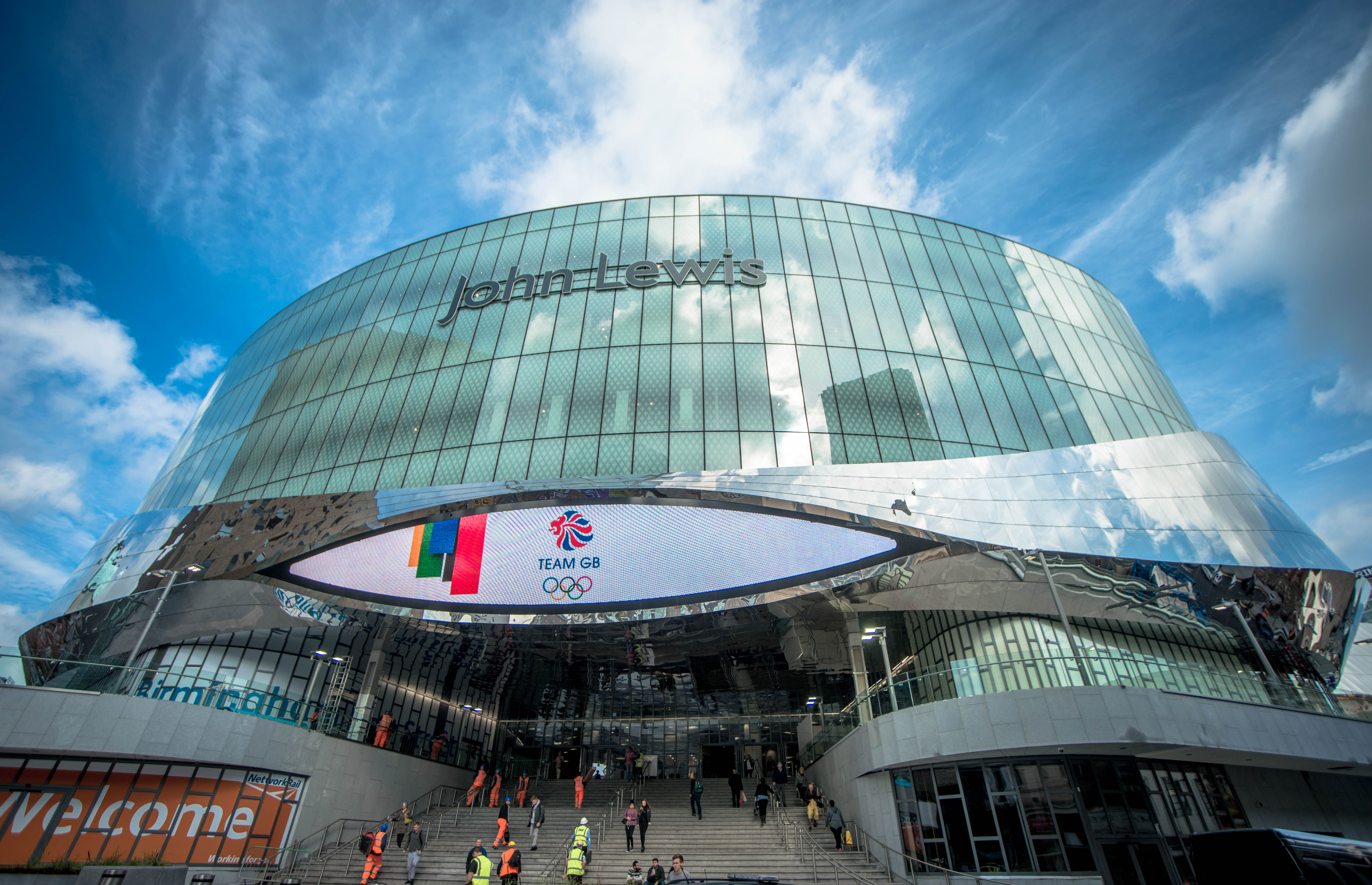
The first John Lewis store in Birmingham opened in 2015; the store closed in 2020 due to financial challenges

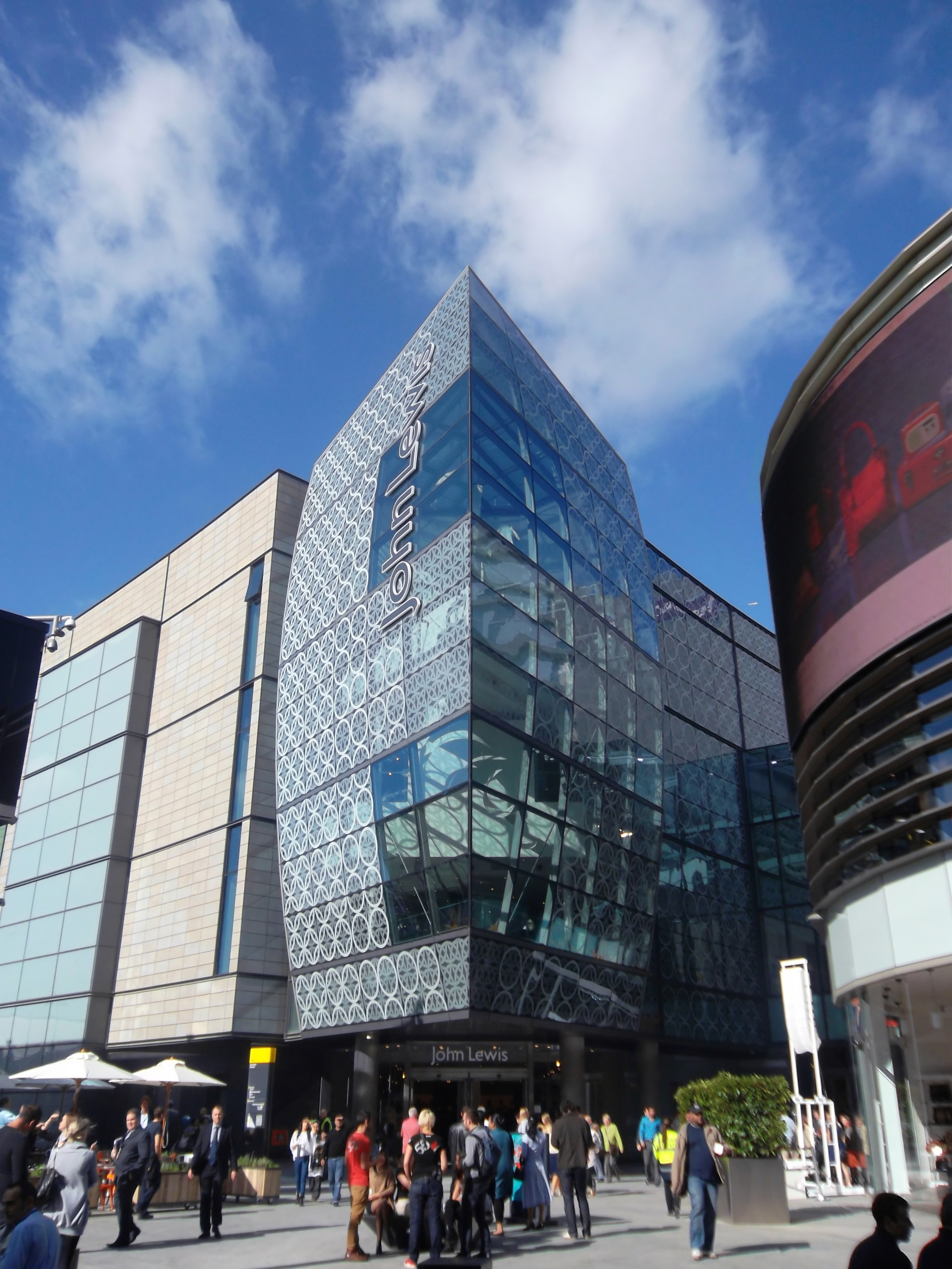
Westfield Stratford City

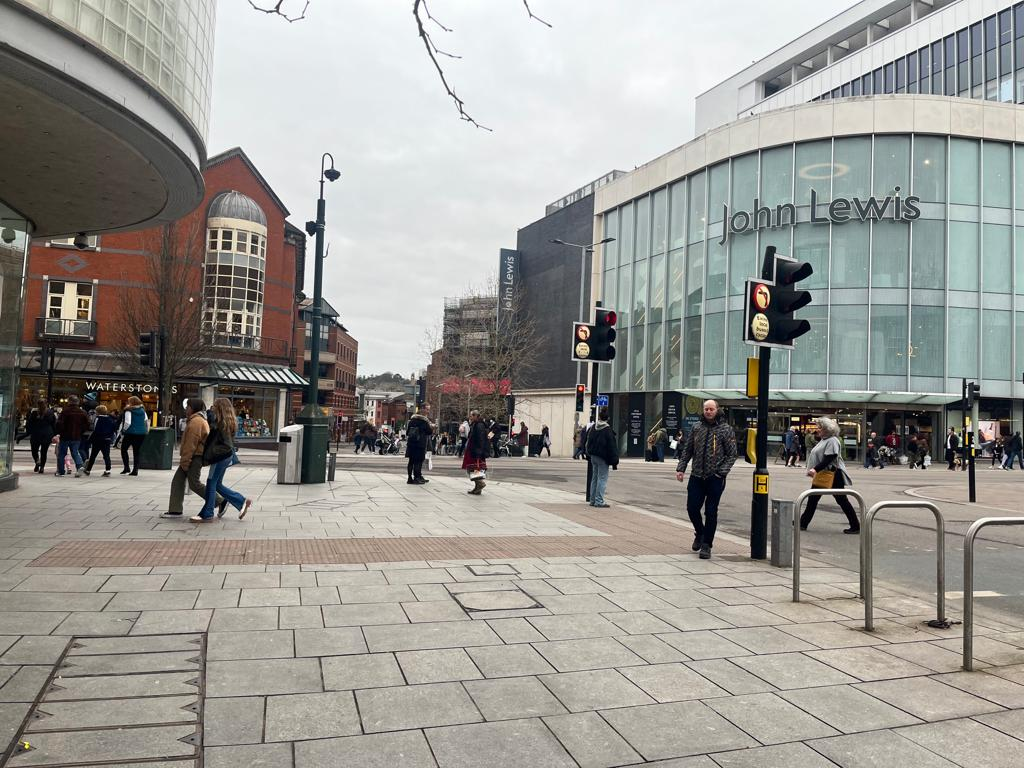
John Lewis In Exeter

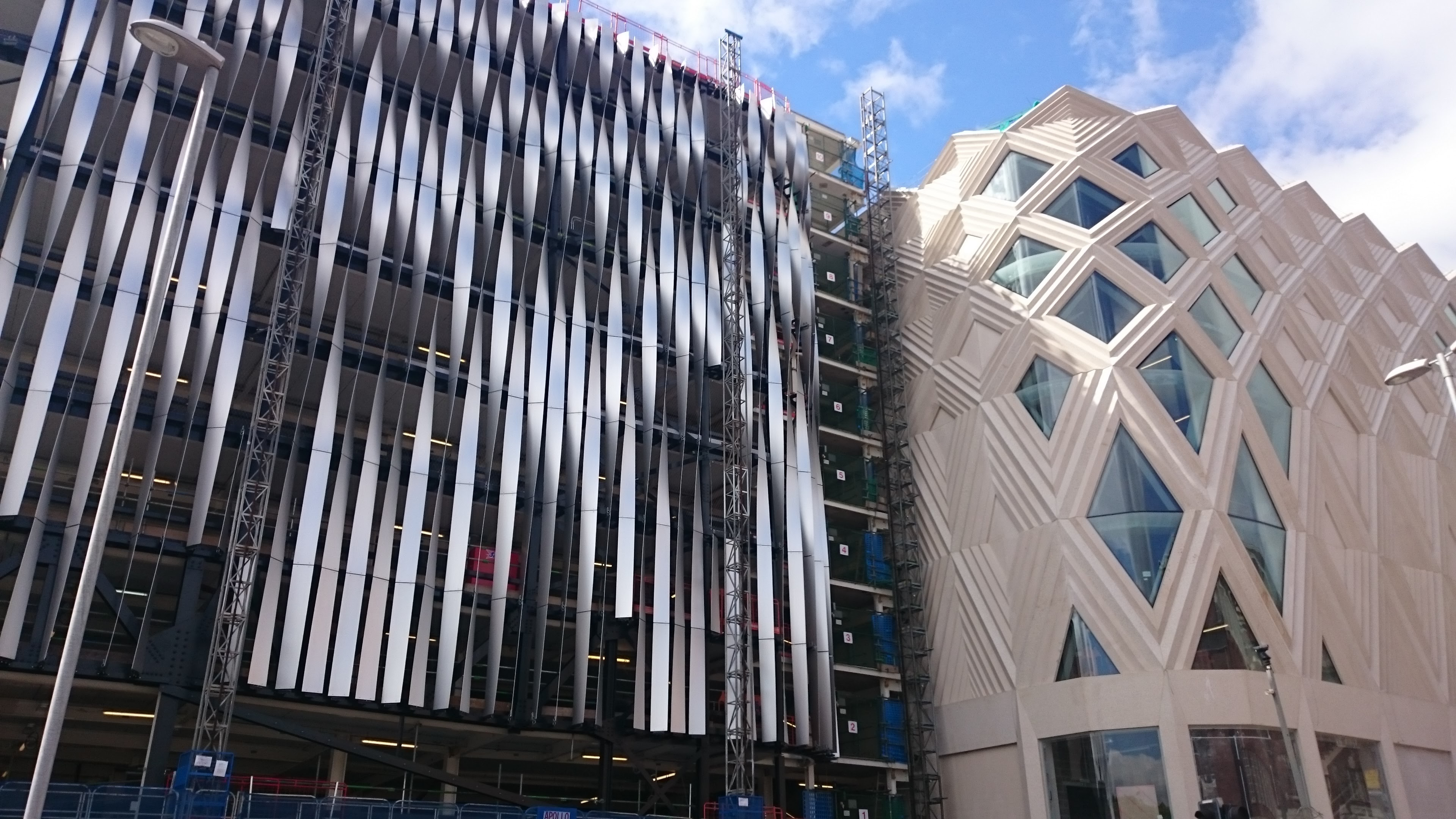
Leeds John Lewis at Victoria Gate
