= Farlington School =

Location
- Strood Park; Horsham, West Sussex, RH12 3PN; England; 51°05′11″N 0°22′51″W

Information
- Type: Independent
- Motto: Vive ut vivas (Live life to the full)
- Established: 1896; 130 years ago
- Founder: The Misses Buller
- Local authority: West Sussex
- Department for Education URN: 126126 Tables
- Ofsted: Reports
- Chair of Governors: Steven Wade, Bellevue Education
- Headmaster: James Passam
- Gender: Girls and boys
- Age: 4 to 18
- Enrolment: 375 pupils
- Houses: Hawking, Luther King, Parks
- Colour: Blue (formerly green)
- Website: http://www.farlingtonschool.com/

Farlington School is an independent day and boarding school for pupils aged four to eighteen in Horsham, West Sussex, England. Farlington was founded in 1896 originally as a girls' school in Haywards Heath but moved to its present site at Strood Park near Horsham in 1955. It is situated about 3 miles (5 km) northwest of the town. Farlington joined the Bellevue Education group in September 2019. The school also has a long association with the University of Chichester in the field of teacher education.

== Heads ==
- Miss Edith Buller, 1896-1898
- Miss Charlotte Moberly 1898-1936
- Miss Isabel Moberly, 1898-1942
- Miss Effie Simpson 1942-1971
- Mrs Mary Shewell, 1971-1974
- Mrs Dorothy Khoo, later Harrington, 1974-1976
- Mrs Olive Peto, 1977-1987
- Mrs Patricia Metham, 1987-1992
- Mrs Trina Mawer, 1992-2006
- Mrs Jonnie Goyer, 2006-2012
- Ms Louise Higson, 2012–2021
- Mr James Passam 2021–present

== Notable alumni ==
- Alexandra Harris, author and professor.
- Jill Hyem, actress and British radio and television writer
- Angela Thorne, known for her roles in To the Manor Born as Audrey fforbes-Hamilton’s best friend Marjory Frobisher, and as Margaret Thatcher in Anyone for Denis?
- Mikaela Loach, climate justice activist

== Notes ==
- Farlington School Centenary 1896-1996 by Elizabeth Garrett
