= Pièces de Clavecin =

Music for harpsichord by Rameau

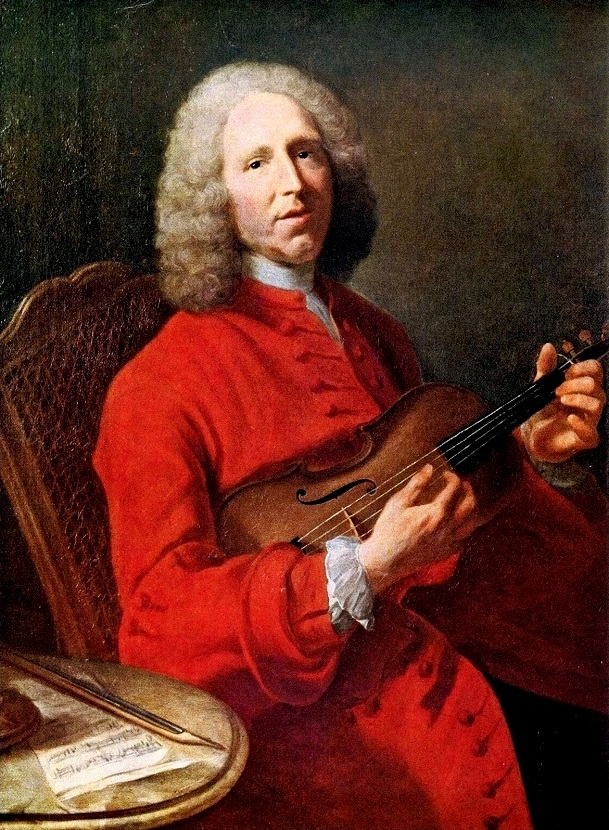
Jean-Philippe Rameau, by Joseph Aved, 1728

The French Baroque composer Jean-Philippe Rameau wrote three books of Pièces de clavecin for the harpsichord. The first, Premier Livre de Pièces de Clavecin, was published in 1706; the second, Pièces de Clavessin, in 1724; and the third, Nouvelles Suites de Pièces de Clavecin, in 1726 or 1727. They were followed in 1741 by Pièces de clavecin en concerts, in which the harpsichord can either be accompanied by violin (or flute) and viola da gamba or played alone. An isolated piece, "La Dauphine", survives from 1747.

== Premier Livre de Pièces de Clavecin (1706) ==
=== Suite in A minor, RCT 1 ===
1. Prélude
2. Allemande I
3. Allemande II
4. Courante
5. Gigue
6. Sarabandes I – Sarabande II
7. Vénitienne
8. Gavotte
9. Menuet

c. 22 mins

== Pièces de Clavessin (1724) ==
Musette

Tambourin
Both recorded by Richard Siegel

=== Suite in E minor, RCT 2 ===
1. Allemande
2. Courante
3. Gigue en Rondeau I
4. Gigue en Rondeau II
5. Le Rappel des Oiseaux
6. Rigaudon I – Rigaudon II et Double
7. Musette en rondeau. Tendrement
8. Tambourin
9. La Villageoise. Rondeau

c. 22 mins

=== Suite in D major, RCT 3 ===
1. Les Tendres Plaintes. Rondeau
2. Les Niais de Sologne – Premier Double des Niais – Deuxième Double des Niais
3. Les Soupirs. Tendrement
4. La Joyeuse. Rondeau
5. La Follette. Rondeau
6. L'Entretien des Muses
7. Les Tourbillons. Rondeau
8. Les Cyclopes. Rondeau
9. Le Lardon. Menuet
10. La Boiteuse

c. 30 mins

=== Menuet en Rondeau in C major, RCT 4 ===
c. 1 minute

== Nouvelles Suites de Pièces de Clavecin (1726–1727) ==
=== Publication history ===
The exact date of publication, at Rameau's own expense, of the Nouvelles Suites de Pièces de Clavecin remains a matter of some controversy. In his 1958 edition of the works, the editor Erwin Jacobi gave 1728 as the original publication date. Kenneth Gilbert, in his 1979 edition, followed suit. Others later argued that these works did not appear until 1729 or 1730. However, a recent reexamination of the publication date, based on the residence Rameau provided in the frontispiece (Rue des deux boules aux Trois Rois), suggests an earlier date, since Rameau's residence had changed by 1728. As a result of this and other evidence, the closest approximation for the original publication date stands between February 1726 and the summer of 1727. This dating is given further authentication by the comments of Friedrich Wilhelm Marpurg, who provided their publication date as 1726. There are almost 40 extant copies of the original 1726/27 edition.

Two later editions followed both around 1760. The first (printed perhaps slightly before 1760) was simply a reimpression of the original engravings, although several plates were reengravings, suggesting that the original plates had undergone sufficient impression to wear them down to a state of illegibility. A second appeared in London under the title A Collection of Lessons for the harpsichord from the printer John Walsh which was based on the earlier Parisian edition.

=== Suite in A minor, RCT 5 ===
Gavotte and Variations

1. Allemande
2. Courante
3. Sarabande
4. Les Trois Mains
5. Fanfarinette
6. La Triomphante
7. Gavotte et six doubles

c. 33 mins

=== Suite in G major/G minor, RCT 6 ===
1. Les Tricotets. Rondeau
2. L'indifférente
3. Menuet I – Menuet II
4. La Poule
5. Les Triolets
6. Les Sauvages
7. L'Enharmonique. Gracieusement.
8. L'Égyptienne

c. 23 mins
