= Nihad Awad =

Muslim activist

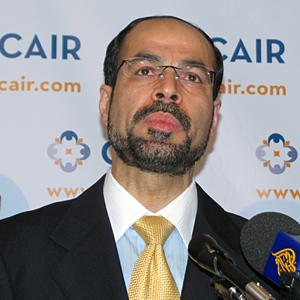
- Born: 1964 (age 61–62); Al-Wehdat, Jordan
- Education: University of Minnesota (BS)
- Website: Official website

Nihad Awad (Arabic: نهاد عوض) is the co-founder and Executive Director of the Council on American-Islamic Relations (CAIR).

== Early life ==
Nihad Awad was born in Amman New Camp, a Palestinian refugee camp in Amman, Jordan. He studied at Second Amman Preparatory School for Boys, located at the camp and belongs to UNRWA, and at Salaheddine High School in Achrafieh in Jordan. He moved to Italy and later to the United States to pursue his university studies.

== Career ==
After studying civil engineering at the University of Minnesota in the 1990s, he worked at the University of Minnesota Medical Center. After the Gulf War, he was the public relations director for the Islamic Association for Palestine (IAP).

In June 1994, IAP president Omar Ahmad and Rafiq Jaber founded the Council on American-Islamic Relations (CAIR), and Awad was hired as the executive director. In a March 1994 speech at Barry University, the future CAIR executive director said in response to an audience question about the various humanitarian efforts in the Palestinian Occupied Territories, "I am in support of the Hamas movement more than the PLO ... there are some [Hamas] radicals; we are not interested in those people." At the time that Awad expressed support for Hamas, the group had not conducted suicide bombings and was not designated a terrorist organization by the US. Awad said in 2006 that he no longer supports the group and has condemned suicide bombings.

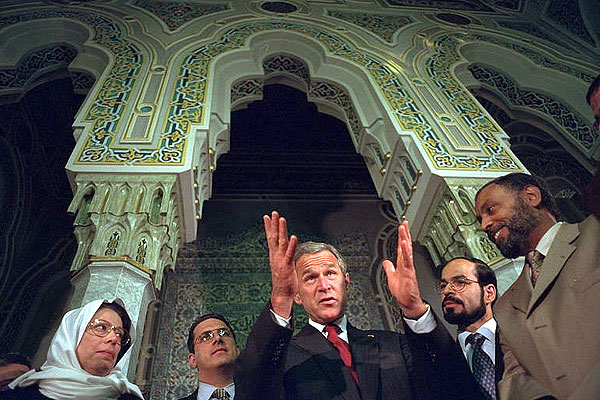
Nihad Awad (second from right) stands to President Bush's left, when Bush said "Like the good folks standing with me, the American people were appalled and outraged at last Tuesday's attacks [on Sept. 11, 2001]."

A few days after the September 11 attacks in 2001, Awad was one of a select group American Muslim leaders invited by the White House to join President George W. Bush in a press conference condemning the attacks and acts of anti-Muslim intolerance that followed.

On October 11, 2023, Awad condemned both the killing of Palestinians and Israelis in the Gaza war and called for a ceasefire. On November 24, Awad said in a speech at the American Muslims for Palestine convention that "The people of Gaza only decided to break the siege, the walls of the concentration camp, on October 7th. And yes, I was happy to see people breaking the siege and throwing down the shackles of their own land and walk free into their land, which they were not allowed to walk in. The people of Gaza have the right to self-defense, have the right to defend themselves, and yes, Israel as an occupying power does not have that right to self-defense." During the same speech, he condemned antisemitism as "real phenomenon, a real evil". He later clarified that these remarks were only an endorsement of Palestinian civilians who briefly crossed the Gaza–Israel barrier to walk on land their ancestors lived on (before the so-called Nakba) and then headed back without committing any crimes; he again condemned the attacks on Israeli civilians. He also said that Palestinians, just like Ukrainians, had the right to defend themselves against an occupation, but only via legal means and never via targeting civilians like Hamas did on October 7. He also said that, since the 1990s, CAIR has condemned both antisemitism and Hamas attacks against Israeli civilians. In response to Awad's comments, a spokesman for President Joe Biden said, "We condemn these shocking, antisemitic statements in the strongest terms," and ended its work with CAIR on crafting a national antisemitism strategy.

== Awards ==
- The Royal Islamic Strategic Studies Centre's "500 Most Influential Muslims 2009"
- Among 100 of the "World's Most Influential Arabs" for 2010 by Arabian Business magazine
- Recipient of the Phillip Brooks House Association's Robert Coles Call of Service & Lecture Award at Harvard College in 2017.
- Listed Among "19 of the Most Important Civil Rights Leaders of Today" by USA Today in 2020.
