= Bury South =

UK Parliament constituency (since 1983)

Coordinates: 53.580°N 2.299°W

- Borough constituency for the House of Commons
- Interactive map of boundaries since 2024
- Location within North West England
- County: Greater Manchester
- Population: 97,842 (2011 census)
- Electorate: 74,598 (March 2020)
- Major settlements: Prestwich, Radcliffe, Whitefield

Current constituency
- Created: 1983
- Member of Parliament: Christian Wakeford (Labour)
- Seats: One
- Created from: Middleton and Prestwich & Bury and Radcliffe

Bury South is a borough constituency represented in the House of Commons of the Parliament of the United Kingdom since 2019 by Christian Wakeford. Wakeford was elected as a Conservative but defected to the Labour Party in January 2022. He was re-elected at the 2024 general election.

== Boundaries ==
=== Historic ===
The constituency was created in 1983 from parts of the former seats of Middleton and Prestwich & Bury and Radcliffe, both of which were Labour-Conservative marginals, held by Labour on slim majorities at the 1979 election. It covers the suburban towns of Radcliffe, Whitefield and Prestwich. The constituency does not contain any area of the town of Bury itself (which is in Bury North), but only towns in the south of the Metropolitan Borough of Bury.

1983–2010: The Metropolitan Borough of Bury wards of Besses, Holyrood, Pilkington Park, Radcliffe Central, Radcliffe North, Radcliffe South, St Mary's, and Sedgley.

2010–2024: The Metropolitan Borough of Bury wards of Besses, Holyrood, Pilkington Park, Radcliffe East, Radcliffe North, Radcliffe West, St Mary's, Sedgley, and Unsworth.

=== Current ===
Further to the 2023 review of Westminster constituencies which came into effect for the 2024 general election, the constituency comprises the following (as they existed on 1 December 2020):

- The Metropolitan Borough of Bury wards of Besses; Holyrood; Pilkington Park; Radcliffe East; Radcliffe West; St. Mary’s; Sedgley; Unsworth.
- The City of Salford ward of Kersal & Broughton Park.

The Radcliffe North ward was transferred to Bury North, offset by the gain of the City of Salford ward of Kersal & Broughton Park from the abolished Blackley and Broughton constituency.

== History ==
Between 1997 and 2019, the seat was represented by Ivan Lewis. Lewis belonged to the Labour Party and was a minister during the Blair and Brown governments, but was suspended in 2018 due to allegations of indecent behaviour. He stood unsuccessfully as an independent in the 2019 election. Prior to 1997, it had been represented by Conservative David Sumberg since the constituency's creation in 1983.

The seat was contested by future cabinet minister Hazel Blears in 1992, narrowly losing and would later be elected in her hometown in nearby Salford the following election until retiring in 2015. The 2017 General Election saw Robert Largan as the runner-up Conservative candidate, who would later be elected for High Peak at the following general election in 2019.

At the 2019 General Election it was the 10th most marginal seat in the country, with a majority of 402 for the Conservative Party candidate Christian Wakeford. Wakeford defected to the Labour Party on 19 January 2022. He was re-elected as the Labour Party candidate at the 2024 general election.

== Constituency profile ==
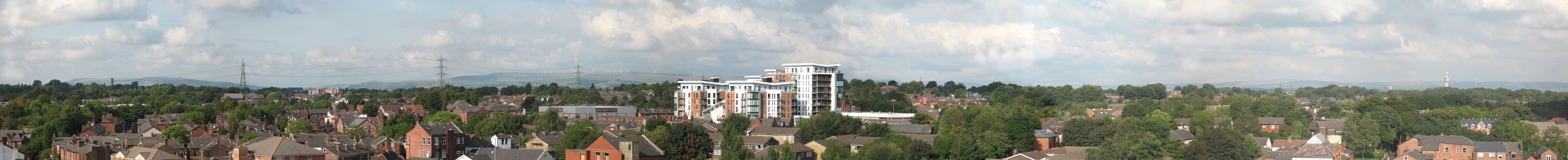
Prestwich Panorama taken from the tower of the Church of Saint Mary the Virgin

The seat covers Prestwich, Whitefield and Radcliffe, towns that were absorbed into the Metropolitan Borough of Bury in 1974, plus, since 2024, the ward of Kersal and Broughton Park from the City of Salford. The western border along the Irwell Valley contains much of Bury's green belt land including Philips Park in Whitefield, Prestwich Clough and Drinkwater Park, making up 500 acres of green space. Prestwich, Whitefield and Broughton Park are residential areas with one of the largest Jewish communities outside London. Radcliffe is a former mill town which declined after the loss of industry, with its only secondary school shut down; it is attempting regeneration as a commuter suburb and features a large park-and-ride Metrolink station.

Simister, a small village to the east of Prestwich opposite Heaton Park still has some farmland, which has been under threat from development. Overall this is an economically diverse area, as there are pockets of social housing in each town, while houses in areas such as Ringley Road in Whitefield, and Sheepfoot Lane in Prestwich, facing Heaton Park, can sell for over £1 million, with mostly owner-occupied semi-detached housing in between. The proportion of graduates and those employed in managerial/professional occupations is slightly above the national average.

At local elections, Prestwich mostly returns Labour and Liberal Democrat councillors, with some historic Conservative representation in Sedgley. Whitefield is a mix of safe Conservative and safe Labour, and Unsworth marginally Labour. Radcliffe was generally Labour with the exception of Radcliffe North, however a localist party, Radcliffe First, has taken from Labour all of the Radcliffe seats within this constituency. The Kersal and Broughton Park ward of Salford has returned mostly Conservative or Independent councillors.

== Members of Parliament ==
Election	Member	Party
1983	David Sumberg	Conservative
1997	Ivan Lewis	Labour
2017	Ivan Lewis	Independent
2019	Christian Wakeford	Conservative
2022	Christian Wakeford	Labour

== Elections ==
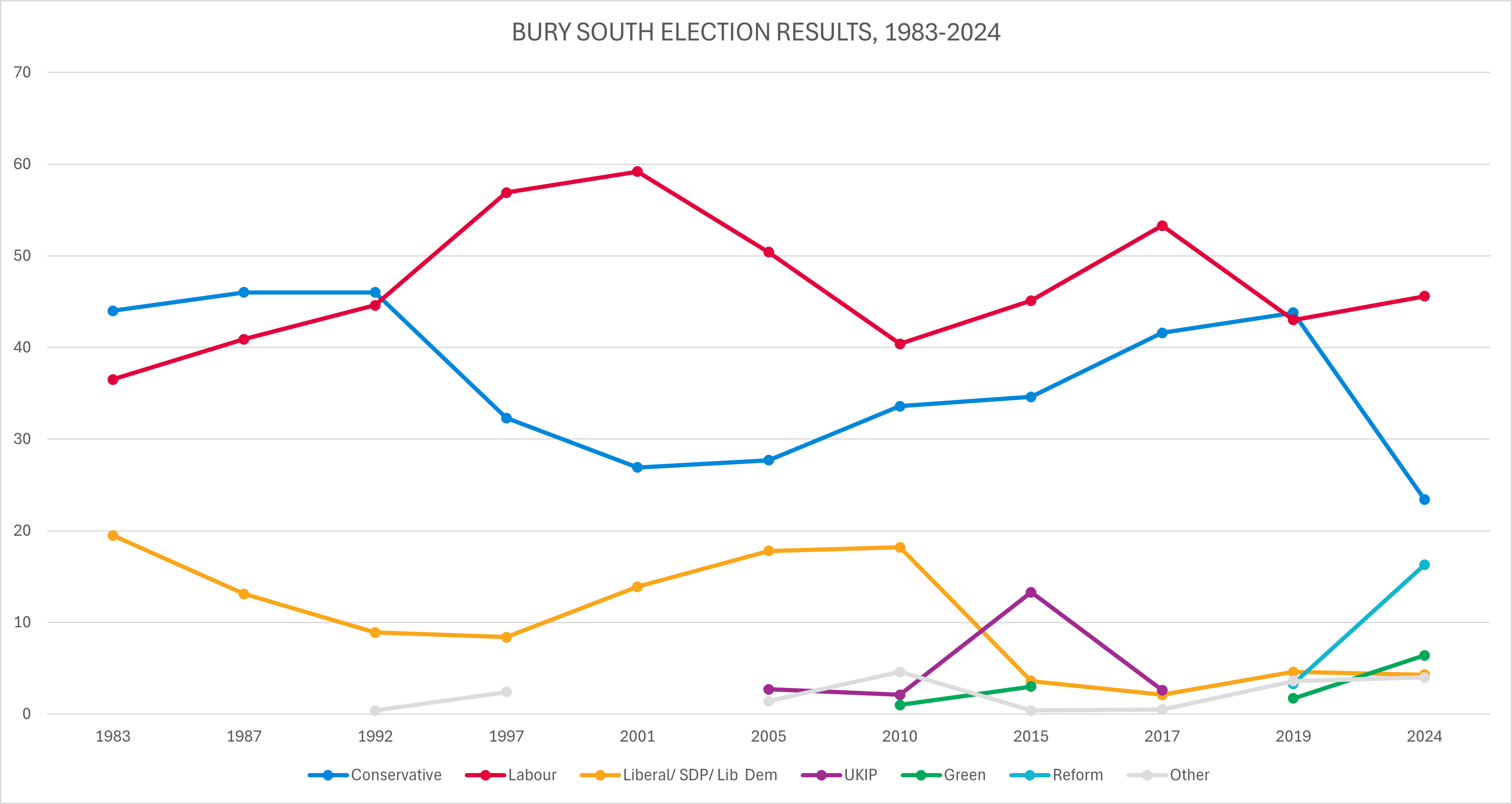
Election results 1983-2024

=== Elections in the 2020s ===
General election 2024: Bury South
Party	Candidate	Votes	%	±%
Labour	Christian Wakeford	19,247	45.6	+4.0
Conservative	Arnie Saunders	9,886	23.4	–20.1
Reform	Jeff Armstrong	6,865	16.3	+12.6
Green	Michael Welton	2,715	6.4	+4.6
Liberal Democrats	Andrew Page	1,796	4.3	–1.9
Workers Party	Sameera Ashraf	1,023	2.4	N/A
Independent	Michael Elston	277	0.7	N/A
English Democrat	Stephen Morris	224	0.5	N/A
Communist	Dan Ross	181	0.4	N/A
Majority		9,361	22.2	N/A
Turnout		42,214	56.0	–10.5
Registered electors		75,339		
Labour gain from Conservative		Swing	+12.0	

=== Elections in the 2010s ===
2019 notional result
Party	Vote	%
Conservative	21,574	43.5
Labour	20,639	41.6
Liberal Democrats	3,059	6.2
Brexit Party	1,847	3.7
Others	1,615	3.3
Green	900	1.8
Turnout	49,634	66.5
Electorate	74,598	

General election 2019: Bury South
Party	Candidate	Votes	%	±%
Conservative	Christian Wakeford	22,034	43.8	+2.2
Labour	Lucy Burke	21,632	43.0	–10.3
Liberal Democrats	Richard Kilpatrick	2,315	4.6	+2.5
Brexit Party	Andrea Livesey	1,672	3.3	N/A
Independent	Ivan Lewis^{1}	1,366	2.7	N/A
Green	Glyn Heath	848	1.7	N/A
Independent	Michael Boyle	277	0.6	N/A
Women's Equality	Gemma Evans	130	0.3	N/A
Majority		402	0.8	N/A
Turnout		50,274	66.9	–2.3
Conservative gain from Labour		Swing	+6.3	

^{1} Note: Ivan Lewis announced his intention to withdraw from the election, however as nominations had closed he remained on the ballot and won 1,366 votes.

General election 2017: Bury South
Party	Candidate	Votes	%	±%
Labour	Ivan Lewis	27,165	53.3	+8.2
Conservative	Robert Largan	21,200	41.6	+7.0
UKIP	Ian Henderson	1,316	2.6	–10.7
Liberal Democrats	Andrew Page	1,065	2.1	–1.5
Independent	Peter Wright	244	0.5	N/A
Majority		5,965	11.7	+1.2
Turnout		50,990	69.2	+5.3
Labour hold		Swing	+0.7	

General election 2015: Bury South
Party	Candidate	Votes	%	±%
Labour	Ivan Lewis	21,272	45.1	+4.7
Conservative	Daniel Critchlow	16,350	34.6	+1.0
UKIP	Séamus Martin	6,299	13.3	+11.2
Liberal Democrats	Paul Ankers	1,690	3.6	–14.6
Green	Glyn Heath	1,434	3.0	+2.0
English Democrat	Valerie Morris	170	0.4	–0.6
Majority		4,922	10.5	+3.7
Turnout		47,215	63.9	–1.7
Labour hold		Swing	+1.8	

General election 2010: Bury South
Party	Candidate	Votes	%	±%
Labour	Ivan Lewis	19,508	40.4	–10.5
Conservative	Michelle Wiseman	16,216	33.6	+5.5
Liberal Democrats	Victor D'Albert	8,796	18.2	+1.1
BNP	Jean Purdy	1,743	3.6	N/A
UKIP	Paul Chadwick	1,017	2.1	–0.5
English Democrat	Valerie Morris	494	1.0	N/A
Green	George Heron	493	1.0	N/A
Majority		3,292	6.8	–16.0
Turnout		48,267	65.6	+7.1
Labour hold		Swing	–8.0	

=== Elections in the 2000s ===
General election 2005: Bury South
Party	Candidate	Votes	%	±%
Labour	Ivan Lewis	19,741	50.4	–8.8
Conservative	Alexander Williams	10,829	27.7	+0.8
Liberal Democrats	Victor D'Albert	6,968	17.8	+3.9
UKIP	Jim Greenhalgh	1,059	2.7	N/A
Independent	Yvonne Hossack	557	1.4	N/A
Majority		8,912	22.7	–9.6
Turnout		39,154	58.5	–0.3
Labour hold		Swing	–4.8	

General election 2001: Bury South
Party	Candidate	Votes	%	±%
Labour	Ivan Lewis	23,406	59.2	+2.3
Conservative	Nicola Le Page	10,634	26.9	–5.4
Liberal Democrats	Tim Pickstone	5,499	13.9	+5.5
Majority		12,772	32.3	+7.7
Turnout		39,539	58.8	–16.6
Labour hold		Swing	+3.9	

=== Elections in the 1990s ===
General election 1997: Bury South
Party	Candidate	Votes	%	±%
Labour	Ivan Lewis	28,658	56.9	+12.3
Conservative	David Sumberg	16,277	32.3	–13.7
Liberal Democrats	Victor D'Albert	4,227	8.4	–0.5
Referendum	Bryan Slater	1,216	2.4	N/A
Majority		12,381	24.6	N/A
Turnout		50,378	75.4	–6.7
Labour gain from Conservative		Swing	+13.0	

General election 1992: Bury South
Party	Candidate	Votes	%	±%
Conservative	David Sumberg	24,873	46.0	0.0
Labour	Hazel Blears	24,085	44.6	+3.7
Liberal Democrats	Adrian Cruden	4,832	8.9	–4.2
Natural Law	Norma Sullivan	228	0.4	N/A
Majority		788	1.4	–3.7
Turnout		54,018	82.1	+2.4
Conservative hold		Swing	–1.9	

=== Elections in the 1980s ===
General election 1987: Bury South
Party	Candidate	Votes	%	±%
Conservative	David Sumberg	23,878	46.0	+2.0
Labour	Derek Boden	21,199	40.9	+4.4
SDP	Derek Eyre	6,772	13.1	–6.4
Majority		2,679	5.1	–2.4
Turnout		51,849	79.7	+3.6
Conservative hold		Swing	–1.2	

General election 1983: Bury South
Party	Candidate	Votes	%	±%
Conservative	David Sumberg	21,718	44.0	
Labour	Derek Boden	17,998	36.5	
SDP	Keith Evans	9,628	19.5	
Majority		3,720	7.5	
Turnout		49,344	76.1	
Conservative win (new seat)				

== See also ==
- List of parliamentary constituencies in Greater Manchester
