= Zaher Birawi =

Palestinian activist and political organizer (born 1961)

Zaher Khalid Birawi
- Born: 1961 (age 64)
- Education: University of Sheffield
- Occupation: activist

Zaher Khalid Birawi (born 1961) is a Palestinian-British activist and political organiser based in London.

== Career ==
Born in the West Bank, Birawi studied at the University of Sheffield and has resided in the United Kingdom since the 1990s. He is a journalist for Al-Hiwar, an Arabic-language television channel in London. As chairman of the Leeds Grand Mosque, he condemned the 7 July 2005 London bombings. Until 2009, he was a director of the Palestinian Return Centre, an organization based in London that advocates for the Palestinian right of return. He is chairman of the International Committee to Break the Siege on Gaza. He was a spokesman for the 2009 Lifeline 3 aid convoy to Gaza led by George Galloway. He also was a spokesman for the 2010 Gaza Freedom Flotilla and says he is a founding member of the Freedom Flotilla Coalition, which organised the June 2025 Gaza Freedom Flotilla.

Birawi is chairman of the EuroPal Forum and a trustee for Education Aid for Palestinians. In January 2023, the EuroPal Forum organized a social media campaign called "Israeli racism in quotes" featuring quotes by Israeli politicians. The campaign was accused of attempting to delegitimize Israel by Israeli NGO Ad Kan and Israeli Minister Amichai Chikli who pledged to take action. In response, Birawi stated: "All we have done is simply take those leaders' quotes and highlight them". During the Gaza war, Birawi participated in protests and wrote a letter to the UK Cabinet accusing Israel of committing genocide in Gaza. He is chair of Palestine Forum in Britain, which is part of a coalition that organized protests during the Gaza war.

The Israeli government designated Birawi as a "Hamas operative" in 2013. In 2023, MP Christian Wakeford stated that Israel considers Birawi a "Hamas operative" in the House of Commons. In January 2026, the U.S. Treasury’s Office of Foreign Assets Control sanctioned seven Palestinian civic organizations, including Popular Conference for Palestinians Abroad (PCPA), based on the allegation that they are tied to Hamas. The Treasury also sanctioned Birawi, alleging that he is part of PCPA leadership.

According to Birawi, the US sanctions are based on faulty information and he was not given a chance to defend himself. He has repeatedly denied the allegations of being a Hamas agent, criticizing them as an attempt to quash pro-Palestine activism and stating that he has never been convicted of a crime. In 2021, Birawi was awarded financial compensation after suing World-Check, a background checking database that had falsely categorized him as a terrorist. According to a 2025 article in Le Figaro, "nothing has formally indicated" that Birawi has links with Hamas.
