= Majed al-Zeer =

Palestinian activist (born 1962)

- Born: December 8, 1962 (age 63); Harmala
- Education: Kuwait University
- Occupations: activist; fundraiser
- Children: 5

Majed al-Zeer (born December 8, 1962) is a Jordanian-British activist and chair of the European-Palestinian Council for Political Relations (EUPAC). He is the former director of the Palestinian Return Centre, an organization that advocates for the Palestinian right of return.

== Early life ==
Al-Zeer was born in the village of Harmala, a member of the Ta'amreh Bedouins. He attended schools in Kuwait, and graduated from Kuwait University with a civil engineering degree in 1986. Whilst at university, he was president of the Islamic Association of Palestinian Students. He moved to the United Kingdom in 1992, and earned a master’s degree in refugee studies at the University of East London in 2002.

== Palestinian Return Centre ==
Al-Zeer has served as the chair of the Palestinian Return Centre (PRC), an organization founded to advocate for the Palestinian right of return. The organization organizes conferences related to pro-Palestine advocacy and produces reports on Palestinian refugees. The PRC has relationships with British politicians from various political parties. Labour politicians such as Jeremy Corbyn, Andy Slaughter, Ian Murray, and Baroness Tonge have attended their conferences. Al-Zeer has served as chair of the Palestinians in Europe conference, an annual conference originally founded by the PRC which has featured European politicians like Ana Miranda Paz, Anne-Marie Mineur, and Richard Boyd Barrett.

Israel declared the PRC an illegal affiliate of Hamas in 2010, enacting sanctions, and then sanctioned al-Zeer in 2013. Additionally, Israel attempted to block the PRC from receiving special consultative status from the United Nations Economic and Social Council by accusing PRC of being linked to Hamas. The attempt was unsuccessful, and PRC achieved the status in 2015. Hamas released a statement saying that it congratulated al-Zeer for helping the PRC become a consultant for the United Nations Economic and Social Council. Sarah Marusek and David Miller published an op-ed in YNet stating that the claim that the PRC was affiliated with Hamas was based on hearsay rather than evidence. Al-Zeer called PRC’s new status a "big win for Palestinian rights and refugees" and said that it represented a positive shift in the world’s view of Palestinian rights.

At a 2012 seminar, al-Zeer stated that the Arab-Israeli conflict is driven by the issue of Palestinian refugees.

In November 2016, the PRC and other Palestinian activists launched a petition asking the British government to issue an apology for the Balfour Declaration. At the campaign's launch event at the UK parliament, al-Zeer stated that the British government has contributed to Palestinian suffering and displacement.

After World-Check designated him as a terrorist, leading to the closure of several bank accounts for him and his organization, al-Zeer filed a lawsuit. In 2019, he was awarded $13,000 plus legal fees, and his name was removed from the terrorism category. His legal team stated that World-Check had incorrectly flagged him as a terrorist based on baseless claims from the Israeli government. The court's decision was praised by Labour MP Andy Slaughter and Conservative MP Crispin Blunt.

Al-Zeer is no longer part of the organization as of 2019.

== Political activism ==
He was denied entry into Jordan for a conference in 2013 without explanation, despite being a citizen and owning a house in Russeifa.

In 2017, al-Zeer chaired the Palestine Abroad Conference in Istanbul, which aimed to form an organization that could represent the Palestinian diaspora. The Palestine Liberation Organization (PLO), which does not provide any formal representation for the Palestinian diaspora, accused the conference organizers of trying to replace it, a claim that al-Zeer denied. Al-Zeer was also involved in organizing the second conference in 2022. He blamed the United Kingdom for "crimes committed against the Palestinian people" at a conference in 2021, and later gave a speech in Berlin saying that Israel would fall in only a matter of time.

According to the German Interior Ministry, al-Zeer serves as Hamas's representative and liaison in Europe, a claim he denies. Der Spiegel reported that German police "stood at Majed Alzeer’s door...looking for evidence" as part of their raids on critics of Israel and organizations suspected of Hamas ties after the October 7 attacks. In 2024, the United States Treasury sanctioned al-Zeer for allegedly serving as Hamas's representative and fundraiser in Europe. al-Zeer rejected the accusations and stated the action was to discourage his work for Palestinian rights, and was pursuing legal action to contest the restrictions. British Labour MP Christian Wakeford accused al-Zeer of being a Hamas operative in November 2023. The Henry Jackson Society and UK Lawyers for Israel pushed in 2025 for the United Kingdom to join the United States and sanction him.

In 2022, al-Zeer founded the European-Palestinian Council for Political Relations (EUPAC), a pro-Palestine advocacy organization based in Brussels. As of 2025, he serves as its chair. His writing has appeared in Al-Jazeera and Middle East Monitor.

== Personal life ==
Al-Zeer is married with four sons and one daughter. He moved from London to Berlin in 2014, and lives in Neukölln.
