= Poly-clip System =

German family-owned company

Coordinates: 50°3′40″N 8°28′42″E

Poly-clip System GmbH & Co. KG
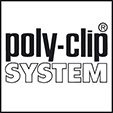
- Company type: Private
- Founded: 1922; 103 years ago in Frankfurt, Germany
- Headquarters: Hattersheim, Germany
- Key people: Joachim Meyrahn; President/CEO
- Number of employees: 404 (2021.)
- Website: www.polyclip.com

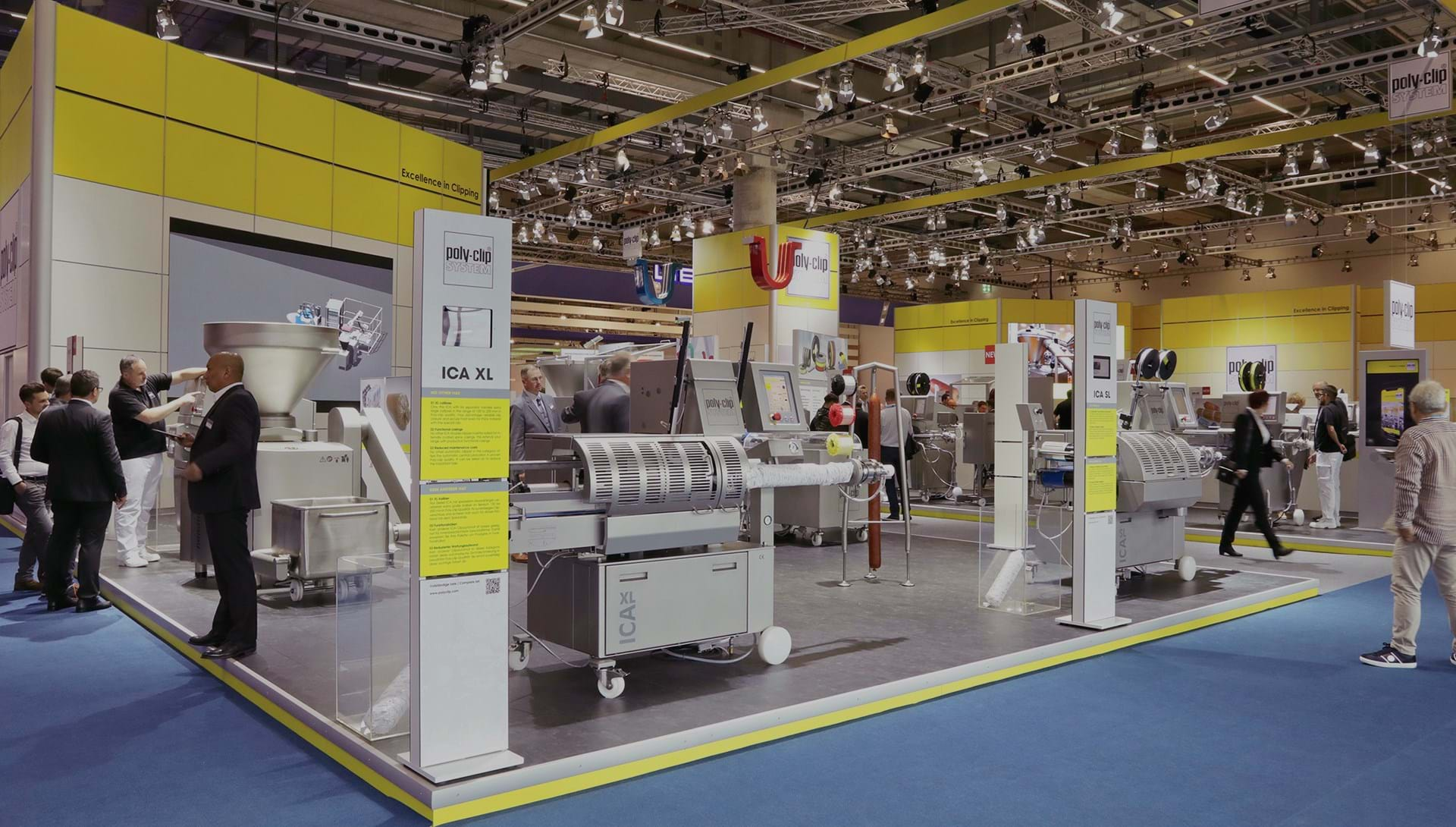
Exhibition stand at the IFFA

Poly-clip System is a German family-owned company based in Hattersheim near Frankfurt am Main. Poly-clip System is the largest provider of clip closure systems worldwide and the world market leader and hidden champion in this sector of the food industry and packaging industry.

== History ==
The founding of the Oswald Niedecker Metallwarenfabrik oHG in Frankfurt/Main dates back to 1 March 1922. The company initially manufactured tools for the processing and forming of sheet metal. From 1932 onwards, Niedecker has been a successful lead seal manufacturer in Germany and has already gained experience with closure systems; the basis of today's clip closure. In 1948, after the death of her husband, Elisabeth Niedecker took over the management of the company.

From 1950, punched and formed parts, mainly parts for brakes for the automotive industry are produced. In 1952, Herbert Niedecker, the son of the founder, takes charge of the company and its 50 employees. During an exhibition in 1957, the idea of closing sausages with metal clips was born.

The trademark poly-clip was registered in 1958. The parent company of today's Poly-clip System, Niedecker Verschlußtechnik GmbH (NVT), was then founded in 1959. In 1962, the company participated for the first time in the industry's leading exhibition IFFA in Frankfurt. For reasons of capacity, the production of clips was moved to Gedern in 1970. In 1972, the registered trade mark poly-clip was announced worldwide.

In 1990, Frank Niedecker takes over the management and pushes the internationalization of the company. From 1991, the company appears under the brand name Poly-clip System. In 2003, Joachim Meyrahn was appointed President/CEO. In 2011, the company moved to its new headquarters in Hattersheim am Main. On May 1, 2023, Poly-clip System was able to recruit Dr. Alexander Giehl as the new managing director and the long-standing Managing Director Dr. Joachim Mehran was given his retirement after 20 years.

== Patents ==
In 1933, Oswald Niedecker received the Patent for his security seal. (DE application 573896 Oswald Niedecker: "Sheet metal capsule seal consisting of two halves to be crimped into each other" filing date 16.03.1933) This closure can be applied without the use of tools and is tamper-proof, as the seal is destroyed when opened.

In 1957, the reel clip (R-clip) was developed for closing sausage and similar products. (DE application 1078495 Herbert Niedecker: "Bag closure in the form of a U-shaped clip" filing date 24.03.1960) This was followed by the development of a machine that enables the clean stripping of the sausage ends by means of a voiding separator (DE application 2550042 Herbert Niedecker: "Device for separating packages from a filled tube" filing date 18.05.1977) and the simultaneous closing of the two ends of a sausage (DE application 1099438 Herbert Niedecker: "Device for closing packages divided from a filled tube by means of two closing clamps applied in one operation at short distances from each other." filing date 09.02.1961) Both processes combined in one automatic clipper revolutionized the worldwide production of sausages to the automatic production of portioned sausages as early as 1967 with the FCA 3401 automatic filling clipping machine.

In 1999, the patent for a safety coating for clips was granted. (DE application 19532691 Frank Niedecker: "Lacquer-coated closing clip" filing date 06.03.1997) This SAFE-COAT safety coating ensures that the consumables clips are food safe on the customer's product. In 2007 the new generation of reel clips, the R-ID clip, followed, which enables bacteria-proof clip closures. (US application 7666073 Heiko Schleucher, Klaus Hein: "Closure clip with round bottom" filing date 23.02.2010) The R-ID generation also includes the clip spool with transponder (RFID)(EP application 1987721 Klaus Hein, Dr. Joachim Meyrahn: "Clip storage drum provided with a transponder" filing date 05.11.2008) and the clipping machines with RFID technology, which recognize clip and closing tools and thus ensure overall safety in the production process.(EP application 1746030 Detlef Ebert, Dr. Joachim Meyrahn: "System comprising a clip machine and a clip supply and method of operating such a clip machine" filing date 24.01.2007)

The company has a total of more than 800 patents.

== Products ==
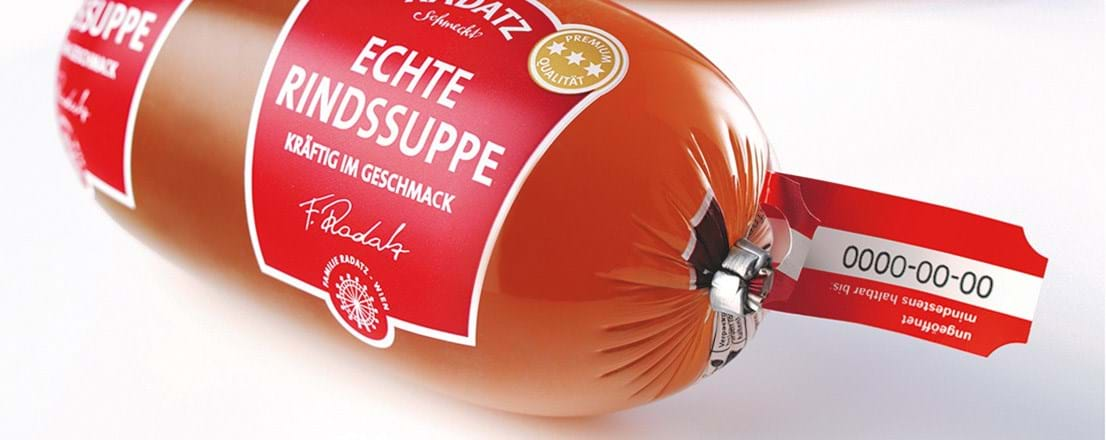
Tubular bag closed with clip at each side, sustainable, minimalist packaging

The product and service range consists of clipping machines, packaging machines and their automation, consumables and services. The SGS Institut Fresenius certifies consumables, which are awarded the SGS Institut Fresenius quality seal. The core of the certification is the testing of the products for food safety (SAFE-COAT, ISO 22000, Halal).

== Applications ==
Originally developed for the meat processing industry and the butcher's trade, the system is used in both the food and non-food sectors, and in other industries that process or pack paste products. In addition to tubular bags which are closed with a clip at each end, bags are also closed with a clip, e.g. for packaging whole poultry.

== Locations ==
The machines and consumables are produced at three locations in Germany and Brazil. Poly-clip System belongs to a group of companies with over 1000 employees worldwide. The group of companies has 31 distribution companies internationally and sales partners in almost all countries of the world.

== Sources ==
- Florian Langenscheidt, ed. (2017), Aus bester Familie (in German) (1. ed.), Hamburg: TEMPUS CORPORATE GmbH – Ein Unternehmen des ZEIT Verlags, pp. 328–331, ISBN 978-3-945627-16-7
- Z. Savic, I. Savic (2016), Sausage Casings (in German) (2. ed.), Wien: VICTUS International GmbH, pp. VII, ISBN 978-3-200-04539-2
- Florian Langenscheidt, Peter May, ed. (2015), The Best of German Mittelstand – The Family Businesses (in German) (1. ed.), Köln: Deutsche Standards EDITIONEN GmbH, pp. 256–259, ISBN 978-3-942597-47-0
- Florian Langenscheidt, Bernd Venohr, ed. (2014), Lexikon der deutschen Weltmarktführer (in German) (2. ed.), Köln: Deutsche Standards EDITIONEN GmbH, pp. 479–482, ISBN 978-3-86936-656-2
- Florian Langenscheidt, Peter May, ed. (2014), Lexikon der deutschen Familienunternehmen (in German) (2. ed.), Köln: Deutsche Standards EDITIONEN GmbH, pp. 796–800, ISBN 978-3-86936-530-5
- Bundesanzeiger: Consolidated financial statements for the financial year from 01.01.2021 to 31.12.2021
