= Palestinian Return Centre =

UK-based advocacy group

- Formation: 1996
- Type: Advocacy organisation
- Website: prc.org.uk

The Palestinian Return Centre (PRC) is a UK-based advocacy group established in 1996 in London. It is an "independent consultancy focusing on the historical, political and legal aspects of the Palestinian refugees". In July 2015, PRC was given special consultative status at the United Nations as non-governmental organisation (NGO). The centre specialises in research and analysis of issues concerning the Palestinians who were displaced, and subsequently prevented from returning, during the 1948 Arab–Israeli War. It advocates "their internationally recognised legal right to return."

== Aims ==
The Palestinian Return Centre frames the situation of the Palestinian Refugees in relation to the "Nakba" or "catastrophe", as it describes the establishment of the State of Israel in 1948 and the resulting displacement of Palestinians. The issue of the Palestinian refugees’ return to Palestine is at the center of the PRC's activities "both as a humanitarian and political concern."

According to its website, the PRC aims to preserve the Palestinian identity and to resist attempts to resettle the dispersed Palestinians in their places of refuge. The PRC coordinates with any individual or group that shares its cause.

The organisation intends to "increase and widen awareness of the suffering of the Palestinians in the Diaspora" and to inform the general public in Europe and Britain in particular about the "truth on the many different dimensions of the Palestinian issue."

Moreover, the organisation endeavours to "establish the status of Palestinian refugees under international law without any equivocation, and campaign for their basic human and legal rights."

== Activities ==
The PRC organises a wide range of events to promote the Palestinian cause both in the United Kingdom and in Europe.

Among the initiatives sponsored by the Palestinian Return Centre are a public seminar in the House of Lords held in June 2015, a public briefing in the House of Parliament in June 2015, and a workshop to support Palestinian refugees in Syria.

In September 2015, the PRC organised an event to encourage public debate on the challenges facing the UN Relief and Works Agency for Palestine Refugees in the Near East (UNRWA), an organisation overtly supported by the centre.

The PRC also produces videos and disseminates articles, books, reports and studies in support of its mission.

== Publications ==
In 2015, the PRC published its Semiannual Documentary Report on Palestinian Refugees in Syria. The report drew on anecdotal evidence from Palestinian refugee camps and residential compounds within Syria, detailing the daily living conditions, healthcare access, and broader humanitarian situation of Palestinian refugees affected by the ongoing Syrian conflict. It also documented instances of abuse and violence arising from the conflict and addressed the situation of displaced Palestinian refugees from Syria who were forced to flee the country, often seeking refuge in neighboring countries as either a temporary stop or a route toward Europe.

A separate publication, the Quarterly Update on Palestinian Prisoners (15 January 2012 – 30 August 2012), provided an overview of the arrest and detention of Palestinian prisoners during that period. Since no update was issued for the first quarter of 2012, this newsletter covered developments across the second and third quarters of the year. It included the latest statistics on arrests, trends in prisoner treatment, individual case summaries, and relevant developments from legal, UN, and EU bodies. The report also outlined the advocacy work conducted by Addameer during the reporting period.

In 2014, the Action Group for Palestinians in Syria, in cooperation with the PRC, issued the First Bi-Annual Report on the Conditions of Palestinian Refugees in Syria. The report focused on the effects of more than three years of conflict in Syria, emphasizing the worsening humanitarian and security conditions for Palestinian refugees living in the country.

== Books ==
PRC senior researcher Nasim Ahmed published the book, Understanding the Nakba, an insight into the plight of Palestinians, provides an analysis of the ongoing dispossession and exile of Palestinians. The book combines major aspects of the conflict for a better understanding of the plight of Palestinians. It pieces together fragments of the Nakba in order to comprehend the historical, political, religious and philosophical currents that have kept Palestinians in their perpetual exile.

The Palestinian Return Centre and the Al Jazeera Centre for Studies joined to produce a new book Palestinian Refugees in the Arab World: Realities & Prospects This book, Palestinian Refugees in the Arab World: Realities and Prospects looks at the most significant aspects of the Palestinian refugee and explores the future possibilities of their plight through studies and papers presented by a group of experts and researchers.

The Future of the Exiled Palestinians in the Settlement Agreements The subject of the Oslo accords and the future of the exiled Palestinians is discussed today with a deep sense of urgency among themselves as well as their kinfolk in Palestine. These discussions are, more often than not, accompanied by intense feelings of anxiety expressed in the recurrent terms of; bewilderment, loss, and misery.

In its series of non-periodical publications, the Palestinian Return Centre/London has published a book titled "The Displaced Palestinians in Lebanon - the bitterness of refuge and tragedies of migration" by the representative of the centre in Lebanon, Mr Ali Huwaidi. The book consists of 146 pages, and covers the political and humanitarian situation of the displaced Palestinians in Lebanon. The book sheds light on the category of displaced Palestinians, a marginalised and absent group on local, regional and international levels. In spite of efforts by research and study centres, activists, and those concerned with the issue of Palestinian refugees, in publishing studies, articles and reports, it was noted that this category of the Palestinian people—who sought refuge in the camps of Lebanon after the Nakba of 1948, and especially in the two camps of al Nabatiyah in South Lebanon, and Tel al Zater in East Beirut—have not been covered.

In 2006 Dr. Tariq M. Suwaidan was the author of Palestine Yesterday, Today and Tomorrow . This book is a brief overview of the long history of Palestine, from its dawn to the present day. It is chronological sequence of events to demonstrate the significance of the ‘Holy Land‘ one of the territories over which much blood has been split throughout history.

The Palestinian Return Centre (PRC) has published the 2010 Edition of The Atlas of Palestine 1917–1966 prepared by the Palestinian writer and historian Dr. Salman Abu Sitta. The Atlas is an outcome of more than 20 years of extensive research and academic work. It is an extended and edited edition of the "Atlas of Palestine 1948", published in 2004.

M. Siraj Sait (2003) Reappraisal of the Rights of Palestinian Refugee Children in the Occupied Territories. "War on children" is undoubtedly one of the most inhuman legacies of the 20th century. More than 1.5 million children were killed in wars worldwide during the 1990s. Palestinian children were not exempted from this scourge. To mark the third anniversary of the Aqsa Intifada the PRC decided to organise a special week of activities in honour of the sacrifices of Palestinian children. The publication of this thought-provoking study falls within the scope of these activities.

Dr. Daud Abdullah edited in 2002 the book titled Israeli Law of Return and its Impact on the Conflict in Palestine. This book is the product of a conference organised by the Palestinian Return Centre, in London, in April 2002 under the same title. It reviews the origins of the Israeli Law of Return, its objectives, development and impact on the conflict in Palestine. The 16 essays presented here are arranged under four broad headings: from the past, ingathering the exiles, building the ethnic state, and legal issues and the future.

Dr. Salman Abu Sitta wrote in 1999 Palestinian Right to Return Sacred, Legal and Possible. Together with al Nakba Register and the map of Palestine 1948, also distributed by the PRC, this booklet should provide a concise description of the refugees issue. It should be clear by now to all concerned that there can be no peace in the Middle East without the return of the refugees to their homes.

== Conferences ==
On 7 May 2005, the PRC, along with the Palestinian Association in Austria and the Expatriate Society in Austria, organised a conference in Vienna titled "Palestine: Land and People - an integral and indivisible unit. No to the racist wall in Palestine". Representatives and delegations of Palestinian communities from 21 European countries attended, along with members of the Arab diplomatic corps in Austria, Austrian government officials, and members of Arab and Muslim communities.

In March 2006, the PRC held a seminar at the Brunei Lecture Theatre, University of London, with the participation of Palestinian organisations and individuals from both official and non-governmental sectors. The seminar was titled "Towards an effective role for the Palestinians abroad in supporting the independence of the economy at home" and was opened by PRC Director Majed al-Zeer.

On 6 May 2006, the Fourth Palestinians in Europe Conference was held in Malmö, Sweden, under the title "Deep rooted Identity and Firm Adherence to their Rights". The event was organised by the PRC and hosted by the Adalah Centre in Sweden, with approximately 5,000 attendees, including delegations from across Europe and representatives of various Palestinian associations and organisations.

The Seventh Palestinians in Europe Conference took place on 2 May 2009 in Milan, Italy, under the theme "Return is a right, no Consent and no Concession". It was attended by thousands of Palestinians from across Europe, along with Palestinian political figures, public personalities, and representatives of Arab, Islamic, and European institutions.

In 2011, the PRC hosted its annual conference in London as part of the second Palestine Memorial Week. Speakers included Dr. Ghada Karmi, who described the Nakba as an ongoing process, and Dr. Salman Abu Sitta, who presented research on the 1948 displacement of Palestinians and proposals for refugee return.

The third Palestine Memorial Week, organised by the PRC, was held from 16 to 23 January 2012. Events took place across British universities and at the UK Houses of Parliament, focusing on commemorating Palestinian victims, including those from the recent war in Gaza.

In 2013, Labour MP Jeremy Corbyn spoke at a meeting convened by the Palestinian Return Centre regarding the importance of history and of how necessary it was for people to understand the origins of the conflict between Israelis and Palestinians.

On 8 November 2014, the "World War I: Impact on Palestine" conference was held in London, United Kingdom, organised by the Al Jazeera Centre for Studies in partnership with the PRC. The event took place shortly after the British Parliament's non-binding vote to recognize the State of Palestine, and focused on the historical impact of World War I on Palestine, particularly in the context of British involvement through the Sykes-Picot Agreement and the Balfour Declaration. The conference was opened by Majed al-Zeer, Chairman of the PRC, who highlighted its legal, political, and academic significance.

On 29 April 2018, the 16th Palestinians in Europe Conference was held in Milan, Italy, under the theme "70 years on … and we shall return", marking 70 years since the Palestinian Nakba. The event was organised by the Europe Palestinians Conference Organisation, the Palestinian Return Centre, and the Palestine Coalition in Italy, and featured lectures, workshops, panel discussions, exhibitions, and cultural activities.

On 20 November 2019, the PRC co-organised a research conference titled "70 Years after the Establishment of UNRWA: Resisting Crises and Building a Fair Future", in collaboration with the Al Jazeera Centre for Studies and the European Centre for Palestine Studies at the University of Exeter. The conference brought together academics and researchers who discussed the ongoing challenges faced by the United Nations Relief and Works Agency for Palestinian Refugees (UNRWA), particularly its financial crisis. Participants recommended increasing international support for UNRWA to help secure the continuity of its services to millions of Palestinian refugees. The event was inaugurated by Tareq Hamoud, Director General of the PRC.

On 22 February 2025, the PRC organised an international conference in London titled "Naming Genocide: The Global Responsibility For Gaza". The event brought together legal experts, academics, advocates, and participants from Gaza to address the situation in the Gaza Strip and examine the legal and humanitarian implications under international law. The conference focused on the application of international legal frameworks to the conflict, the lived experiences of Palestinians in Gaza, and the role of global solidarity.

== International recognition ==
In 2010, Israel designated the PRC as an unlawful organization, stating they promote Hamas' agenda in Europe and directly coordinate Hamas leadership in Gaza and the Gulf states.

On 1 June 2015, the Palestinian Return Centre was among 10 groups recommended by the UN Committee on Non-Governmental Organizations for special consultative status with the Economic and Social Council. The PRC obtained special consultative status with 12 votes in favour, 3 against (Israel, United States and Uruguay), 3 abstentions (Greece, India, Russian Federation), and one absent member (Burundi).

In July 2015, and despite Israel's objection, the UN Economic and Social Council (ECOSOC) approved the recommendation.

PRC co-founder, Majed al-Zeer, was designated as a "senior Hamas representative in Germany" by the U.S. Department of Treasury's Office of Foreign Assets Control (OFAC) in October 2024. PRC's other co-founder Zaher Birawi is facing possible sanctions from the UK government spearheaded by Keir Starmer and MP Christian Wakeford for being a Hamas operative.

== See also ==
- Israeli–Palestinian conflict
- Palestinian diaspora
- United Nations General Assembly Resolution 194
