= The International Who's Who =

Series of reference books

The International Who's Who is a Who's Who series of reference books of notable people worldwide that has been published annually since 1935.

== History ==
The first edition was published in 1935 by Europa Publications.

The eighth edition (1943–44) was published in 1943 at the height of the Second World War and included for the first time the names of Generals Eisenhower, Vatutin and Govorov. The publishers note in their preface that they took special pains to include details of those in the Axis countries and Adolf Hitler appeared accordingly under H in the book.

From 2000, the series has been published by Routledge, an imprint of the UK publishing group Taylor and Francis, and by 2006 it contained approximately 25,000 entries.

== Scams ==
The Who's Who brand has been tainted by the numerous Who's Who scams, which function by attempting to convince someone that they deserve to be in a Who's Who directory, but a prepayment is required.

== See also ==
- World Leaders
