= United Muslim American Association =

Islamic organizations based in the United States

The United Muslim American Association is an organization in Illinois for the purpose of empowering Muslims through the political process. It was founded by Rafiq Jaber.

== See also ==
Rafiq Jaber
