= Ivan Lewis =

British Independent politician

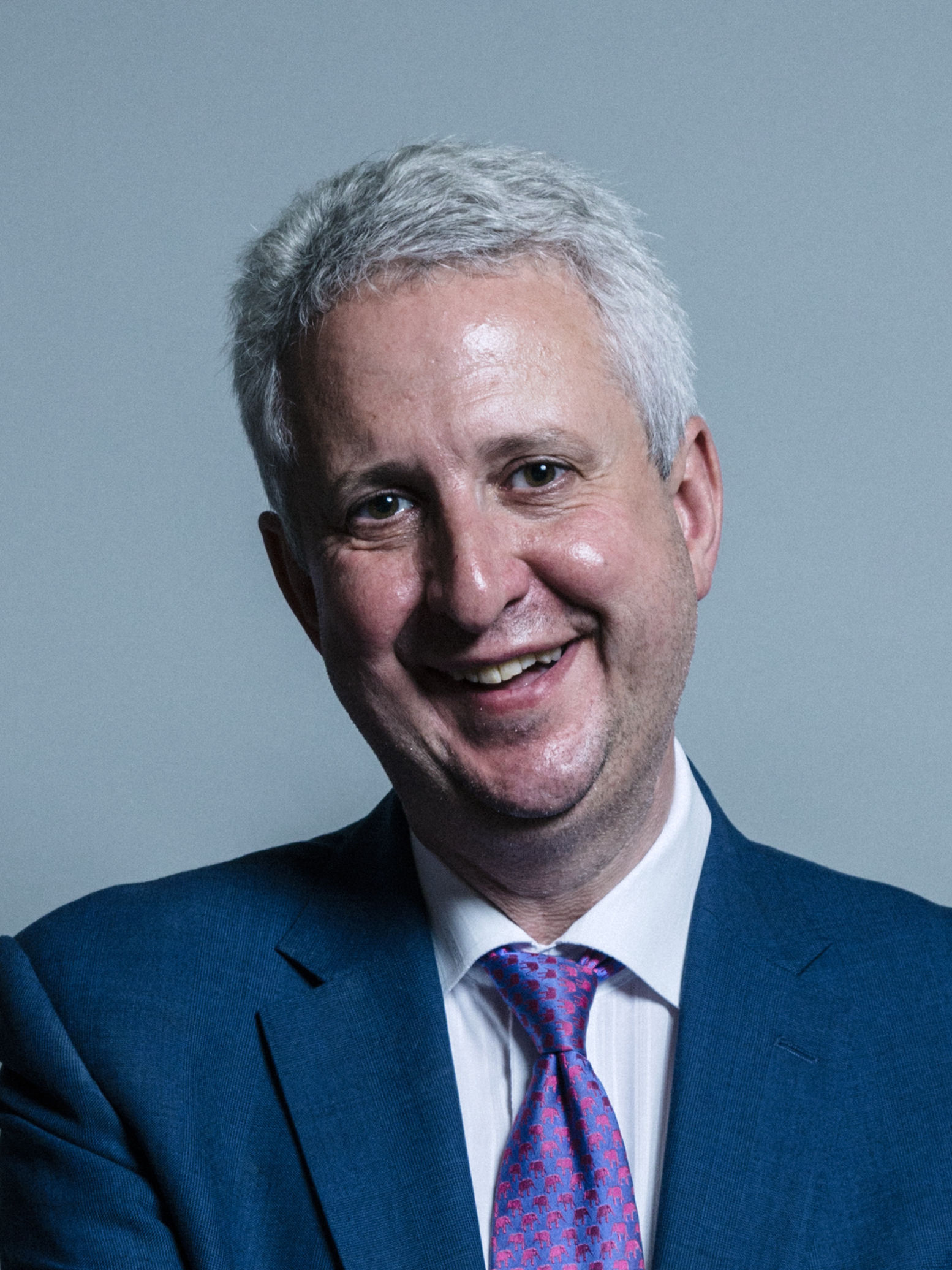
- Official portrait, 2017

Shadow Secretary of State for Northern Ireland
- In office 7 October 2013 – 13 September 2015
- Leader: Ed Miliband; Harriet Harman (Acting)
- Preceded by: Vernon Coaker
- Succeeded by: Vernon Coaker

Shadow Secretary of State for International Development
- In office 7 October 2011 – 7 October 2013
- Leader: Ed Miliband
- Preceded by: Harriet Harman
- Succeeded by: Jim Murphy

Shadow Secretary of State for Culture, Media and Sport
- In office 8 October 2010 – 7 October 2011
- Leader: Ed Miliband
- Preceded by: Ben Bradshaw
- Succeeded by: Harriet Harman

Minister of State for Foreign and Commonwealth Affairs
- In office 8 June 2009 – 11 May 2010
- Prime Minister: Gordon Brown
- Preceded by: Bill Rammell
- Succeeded by: The Lord Howell of Guildford

Minister of State for International Development
- In office 5 October 2008 – 8 June 2009
- Prime Minister: Gordon Brown
- Preceded by: Gillian Merron
- Succeeded by: Michael Foster

Minister of State for Care Services
- In office 15 May 2006 – 3 October 2008
- Prime Minister: Tony Blair; Gordon Brown
- Preceded by: The Lord Warner
- Succeeded by: Phil Hope

Member of Parliament for Bury South
- In office 1 May 1997 – 6 November 2019
- Preceded by: David Sumberg
- Succeeded by: Christian Wakeford

Personal details
- Born: 4 March 1967 (age 59) Prestwich, Lancashire, England
- Party: Labour (Before 2018; suspended 2017-2018); Independent (2018–present)
- Spouse: Juliette Fox (1990–2006)
- Children: 2
- Education: Bury College

Ivan Lewis (born 4 March 1967) is a British politician who served as Member of Parliament (MP) for Bury South from 1997 to 2019, initially as a member of the Labour Party then as an independent from 2017.

After serving in various ministerial positions, including Foreign Affairs, International Development, Education and Health under Prime Ministers Tony Blair and Gordon Brown from 2001 to 2010, Lewis was Shadow Secretary of State for Culture, Media and Sport until October 2011, when he was appointed Shadow Secretary of State for International Development. In the October 2013 Shadow Cabinet reshuffle, he became Shadow Secretary of State for Northern Ireland. Following Jeremy Corbyn's election as Labour leader in September 2015, Lewis was dismissed from the shadow cabinet.

Lewis was suspended from the Labour Party in November 2017 after sexual misconduct allegations. He resigned from the Labour Party in December 2018, citing his concerns about antisemitism in the party and the leadership of Jeremy Corbyn. Lewis sat as an independent MP until the 2019 General Election, when he stood as an independent candidate in Bury South. During the campaign Lewis urged voters to support the Conservatives rather than himself when it became clear his candidature could allow Labour to win and inadvertently boost Corbyn's chances of becoming prime minister.

== Early life and career ==
Lewis was born in Prestwich, in the Bury South constituency which he later represented, into a British Jewish family. He was educated at Manchester Jewish Day School in Prestwich (primary school) and at William Hulme Grammar School in Manchester, followed by Stand Sixth Form College and Bury College. Before his election in 1997, he worked in the voluntary sector from 1986 to 1997 for the learning disabilities support group Contact Community Care Group and as Chief Executive of the Manchester Jewish Federation.

Lewis also served as a Councillor on Bury Metropolitan Borough Council for the Sedgley ward, being elected in 1990 at 23 years of age and held the position of Chairman of the Social Services Committee.

== Political career ==
=== In government ===
Lewis was first elected to Parliament in the 1997 Labour landslide with a 13% swing and a majority of over 12,000 votes over the incumbent Conservative David Sumberg who had served since 1983. He further increased his majority in the 2001 General Election. He served as Parliamentary Private Secretary to Secretary of State for Trade and Industry Stephen Byers from July 1999 to June 2001.

Between June 2001 and June 2002, Lewis was the Parliamentary Under-Secretary of State for Young People and Learning within the Department for Education and Skills and then for Adult Learning and Skills. From June 2002 to May 2005, he became Under-Secretary of State for Skills and Vocational Education in the same department.

As a junior minister Lewis was responsible for the White Paper 21st Century Skills: Realising our Potential, launched in 2003. It proposed increased support for adults seeking to gain technical and craft qualifications where regional skills shortages existed, removing the age limit for Modern Apprentices and making information and communications technology the third essential "skill for life" alongside literacy and numeracy.

Lewis was also involved with a scheme to introduce apprenticeships for 14-year-olds alongside their schooling, commenting that Britain needed to challenge "uniquely snobbish" attitudes toward vocational education

Lewis then served as Economic Secretary to the Treasury from May 2005 to May 2006. He was moved to a junior ministerial position in the Department of Health in the Cabinet reshuffle in May 2006.

On 29 June 2007, in Gordon Brown's first reshuffle as Prime Minister he was re-appointed to the post of Parliamentary under-secretary of state in the Department of Health, the only junior minister to survive the reshuffle where he held on to the brief for social care and added mental health services.

=== Minister for Care Services 2006 to 2008 ===
As Minister for Care Services, Lewis led the introduction of Putting People First, the then government's policy (accepted by the incoming coalition government) to personalise the provision of social care services for the elderly and people with disabilities. The policy offered adults eligible for care services the ability choose their own care services from a "personal budget", and shifted some responsibilities from the NHS to councils.

Lewis described his own policy changes as "arguably the biggest redistribution of power from the state to the citizen that we have ever seen", while David Brindle of The Guardian praised him for having done a "huge amount" to raise the profile of social care.

In March 2008, Lewis warned that the Labour Party was losing touch with ordinary people under the leadership of Gordon Brown in an article written for Progress Online. Lewis stated he believed the Government had lost touch with what fairness meant to the mainstream majority. He wrote:

We cannot afford to be reticent or selective about what fair means in today's Britain. Fairness means everyone paying an appropriate level of tax. It is true there is nothing wrong with being 'stinking rich' providing you pay a significantly higher proportion in tax than your fellow citizen with a modest disposable income. Fairness means a Labour government not remaining silent when any company rips the consumer off or directors of poorly performing organisations in the public or private sector receive extortionate bonuses. Fairness means equal treatment and opportunities for women and ethnic minorities in the workplace, not skilled white men denied career opportunities in the name of equality.

=== Text messages incident ===
In 2008, the Department of Health confirmed Lewis had made an apology for his behaviour when in 2007 he began sending increasingly intimate text messages to then aide Susie Mason, which ultimately led to her registering concern, and successfully seeking an alternative position within the Civil Service before leaving for the private sector. Nick Cohen pointed out in The Observer on 14 September 2008 that the revelations about Lewis's private life followed articles by Lewis which constituted coded attacks on Gordon Brown.

In his book The End of the Party: The Rise and Fall of New Labour, the journalist Andrew Rawnsley suggested that Lewis was a target of "Gordon Brown's Hit Squad". In relation to the Susie Mason story, Rawnsley wrote: "Yet there were few Labour MPs who doubted that the story was planted by No. 10, which was privy to a confidential Whitehall report about the civil servant. The hit on Lewis stunned Ministers who regarded themselves as unshockable". The story was leaked twelve months after the events occurred. Senior civil servants dealing with the Mason issue advised that no action should be taken against Lewis.

Brown's former communications chief, Damian McBride, confessed in his memoir that he reprimanded Lewis, then junior health minister, in 2008 for commenting on tax policy, only to be passed the message that Lewis would not be intimidated. Angered, McBride then fed to the News of the World a story about Lewis allegedly pestering a young female civil servant in his private office. McBride expressed deep remorse in retrospect, saying he had been "a cruel, vindictive, thoughtless bastard".

=== Department for International Development; Foreign and Commonwealth Office ===
On 3 October 2008, Lewis moved to the Department for International Development (DfID). There, he spearheaded a campaign to persuade other Governments and multilateral agencies to prioritise maternal health.

He remained there until June 2009, when he was promoted to Minister of State for Foreign and Commonwealth Affairs. Lewis was responsible for the UK's Middle East policy, the UK's relations with the US and China, counter terrorism and counter proliferation.

=== Vioxx ===
In 2009, The Guardian reported, following his promise to assist British users of the drug "Vioxx" (produced by Merck) with legal fees in their attempt to claim damages, Lewis changed his mind within hours of an "expensive lobbying effort" by Merck. Vioxx has been shown to increase the risk of heart failure in users. It transpired subsequently that because of his promise to assist, the Department of Health replaced Lewis on all Vioxx related issues with another Minister.

=== In Opposition ===
In October 2010, Lewis was elected by his fellow Labour MPs to the Shadow Cabinet and appointed Shadow Secretary of State for Culture, Media and Sport by Labour Leader Ed Miliband.

In September 2011, Lewis was reappointed to the Shadow Cabinet as Shadow Secretary of State for International Development. Lewis is a member of Labour Friends of Israel.

In October 2013, Lewis was moved in a Shadow Cabinet reshuffle from the International Development portfolio to the Shadow Northern Ireland one. However, despite his reshuffle, which was seen by many commentators as a demotion, he fulfilled a standing commitment to outline Labour's vision on International Development at The University of Manchester, during Manchester Policy Week. In the September 2015 Labour shadow cabinet reshuffle under the newly elected leader Jeremy Corbyn, Lewis offered to continue in the role of Shadow Secretary of State for Northern Ireland temporarily amid the troubling political situation there. Lewis reported that Corbyn had rejected his offer and informed him by text message that he had decided to give the role to another MP.

=== One Nation Labour ===
Lewis was one of the key figures influencing the Labour Party's political thinking and direction during Ed Miliband's leadership. He was one of the co-originators of the notion of One Nation Labour, which formed the foundation of Miliband's keynote speech at the Labour Party Conference held in Manchester in September 2012.

Lewis had originally floated the concept in a chapter written for The Purple Book, a collection of essays written by mainly senior figures in the party offering new policy ideas.

=== Mayoral candidacy ===
In February 2016, Lewis announced his intention to seek the Labour candidacy nomination for the post of the directly elected Mayor of Greater Manchester. On 9 August that year, the Labour Party announced that Andy Burnham would be the mayoral candidate.

=== Sexual harassment allegations, suspension and resignation ===
On 23 November 2017, the Labour Party suspended Lewis from the party subject to investigation following allegations of sexual harassment. On 20 December 2018, Lewis resigned from the Labour Party in protest at alleged antisemitism in the party and Jeremy Corbyn's leadership. Lewis initially intended to stand as an independent for re-election at the 2019 general election, but later withdrew his candidacy (although his name still appeared on ballot papers, as he withdrew too late to formally exit the contest). Instead, Lewis urged his supporters to vote for the then Conservative candidate Christian Wakeford (who later defected to the Labour Party). Lewis ultimately polled 1,366 votes as an independent candidate.

== Personal life ==
Lewis married Juliette Fox in Stockport in June 1990. They have two sons, and are now divorced.

Parliament of the United Kingdom
Preceded by David Sumberg	Member of Parliament for Bury South; 1997–2019	Succeeded by Christian Wakeford
Political offices
Preceded by John Healey	Economic Secretary to the Treasury; 2005–2006	Succeeded by Ed Balls
Preceded by The Lord Warner	Minister of State for Care Services; 2006–2008	Succeeded by Phil Hope
Preceded by Gillian Merron	Minister of State for International Development; 2008–2009	Succeeded by Michael Foster
Preceded by Bill Rammell	Minister of State for Foreign and Commonwealth Affairs; 2009–2010	Succeeded by Jeremy Browne
Preceded by Ben Bradshaw	Shadow Secretary of State for Culture, Media and Sport; 2010–2011	Succeeded by Harriet Harman
Preceded by Harriet Harman	Shadow Secretary of State for International Development; 2011–2013	Succeeded by Jim Murphy
Preceded by Vernon Coaker	Shadow Secretary of State for Northern Ireland; 2013–2015	Succeeded by Vernon Coaker
