= Council on American–Islamic Relations =

American Muslim advocacy group

- Formation: June 1994; 32 years ago
- Founder: Omar Ahmad
- Type: 501(c)(3) organization
- Tax ID no.: 77-0646756
- Purpose: Muslim activism
- Headquarters: Washington, D.C.
- Location: 453 New Jersey Ave., S.E.
- Region served: United States
- Executive Director: Nihad Awad
- Key people: Roula Allouch (Chairperson); Ibrahim Mossallam (Board VP); Ibrahim Hooper (National Communications Director)
- Staff: 70+
- Volunteers: 300+
- Website: www.cair.com

The Council on American–Islamic Relations (CAIR) is an American Muslim civil rights and advocacy group. It is headquartered on Capitol Hill in Washington, D.C., with regional offices nationwide. Through civil rights actions, media relations, civic engagement, and education, CAIR works to promote social, legal and political activism among Muslims in the United States.

== History ==
=== Early years (1994–2001) ===
CAIR was founded in June 1994. CAIR's first office was located in Washington, D.C., as is its present-day headquarters on Capitol Hill. Its founding was partly in response to the film True Lies, which Arab and Muslim groups condemned for its stereotyping of Arab and Muslim villains. The offices opened a month before the film's release. CAIR's first advocacy campaign was in response to an offensive greeting card that used the term "Shi'ite" to refer to human excrement. CAIR led a national campaign and used activists to pressure the greeting card company, which eventually withdrew the card from the market.

In 1995, CAIR handled its first case of hijab discrimination, in which a Muslim employee was denied the right to wear the hijab; this type of complaint became one of the most common received by CAIR's civil rights department.

CAIR continued its advocacy work in the aftermath of the April 19, 1995 Oklahoma City bombing of the Murrah Federal Building. Following the attack, Muslim-Americans were subjected to an upsurge in harassment and discrimination, including a rise in hate crimes nationally; 222 hate crimes against Muslims nationwide were reported in the days immediately following the bombing. The bombing gave CAIR national stature for their efforts to educate the public about Islam and religious bias in America; their report was featured on the front page of The New York Times on August 28, 1995, and was subsequently mentioned on ABC World News Tonight.

In 1996, CAIR began "CAIR-NET", a read-only e-mail listserv aimed to help American Muslims identify and combat anti-Muslim prejudice in the U.S. and Canada. CAIR-NET contained descriptions of news, bias incidents or hate speech and hate crimes, often followed by information as to whom readers may contact to influence resolution of an issue. CAIR also held its first voter registration drive in 1996; CAIR continues to encourage active political participation by American Muslims, for them to address political candidates and elected representatives with greater frequency.

In 1996, CAIR published a report The Usual Suspects regarding its perception of anti-Muslim rhetoric in the media after the crash of TWA Flight 800. Their research showed 138 uses of the terms "Muslim" and "Arab" in the 48 hours after the crash in Reuters, UPI, and AP articles covering the incident. The official NTSB report said that the crash was most likely caused by mechanical failure.

In 1997, CAIR objected to the production of sneakers made by Nike with a design on the heel similar to the Arabic word for "Allah". As part of an agreement reached between CAIR officials and Nike representatives, Nike apologized to the Muslim community, recalled the products carrying the design, launched an investigation as to how the logo came about, and built a number of children's playgrounds near some Islamic centers in America.

In 1997, as depictions of Muhammad are seen as blasphemous by some Muslims, CAIR wrote to United States Supreme Court Chief Justice William Rehnquist requesting that the sculpted representation of Muhammad on the north frieze inside the Supreme Court building be removed or sanded down. The court rejected CAIR's request.

=== Post-9/11 (2001–2006) ===
In October 2001, CAIR opposed the United States invasion of Afghanistan after the September 11 attacks. By January 2002, four months after the attacks, the CAIR said that it had received 1,658 reports of discrimination, profiling, harassment, and physical assaults against persons appearing Arab or Muslim, a threefold increase over the prior year. The reports included beatings, death threats, abusive police practices, and employment and airline-related discrimination."

A CAIR initiative funded in part by a $500,000 donation from Saudi Prince Al-Waleed bin Talal bin Abdul Aziz Al Saud sent a set of 18 books and tapes to public libraries written by Muslim and non-Muslim authors on Islamic history and practices, as well as an English translation of the Quran.

In 2005, CAIR coordinated the joint release of a fatwa by 344 American Muslim organizations, mosques, and imams nationwide that stated: "Islam strictly condemns religious extremism and the use of violence against innocent lives. There is no justification in Islam for extremism or terrorism. Targeting civilians' life and property through suicide bombings or any other method of attack is haram or forbidden—and those who commit these barbaric acts are criminals, not martyrs." The fatwa cited passages from the Quran and hadith that prohibit violence against innocent people and injustice, and was signed by the Fiqh Council of North America.

Also in 2005, following the Qur'an desecration controversy of 2005 at the Guantanamo Bay detention camp, CAIR initiated an "Explore the Quran" campaign, aimed at providing free copies of the Quran to any person who requested it.

In June 2006, CAIR announced a $50 million project to create a better understanding of Islam and Muslims in the US. ($10 million per year for five years), in a project to be spearheaded by Paul Findley, a former US Congressman.

Also in 2006, CAIR sent a group of representatives to Iraq to urge kidnappers to release American journalist Jill Carroll. Carroll was eventually released unharmed.

In December 2006, California Senator Barbara Boxer withdrew a "certificate of accomplishment" originally given to former CAIR official Basim Elkarra after Boxer's staff looked into CAIR, and she became concerned about some of CAIR's past statements and actions, and statements by some law enforcement officials that it provides aid to international terrorist groups.

=== Holy Land Foundation case (2007) ===
In 2007, CAIR was named, along with 245 others, by U.S. Federal prosecutors in a list of unindicted co-conspirators or joint venturers in a Hamas funding case involving the Holy Land Foundation, which in 2009, caused the FBI to cease working with CAIR outside of criminal investigations due to its designation. CAIR was never charged with any crime, and it complained that the designation had tarnished its reputation.

Specifically, in May 2007, the U.S. filed an action against the Holy Land Foundation (the largest Muslim charity in the United States at the time) for providing funds to Hamas, and federal prosecutors filed pleadings. Along with 245 other organizations, the prosecutors publicly listed CAIR (and its chairman emeritus, Omar Ahmad), Islamic Society of North America (largest Muslim umbrella organization in the United States), Muslim American Society and North American Islamic Trust as unindicted co-conspirators or joint venturers, a legal designation that prosecutors can employ for a variety of reasons including grants of immunity, pragmatic considerations, and evidentiary concerns. While being listed as co-conspirator does not mean that CAIR has been charged with any crime, the organization was concerned that the label will forever taint it.

On October 22, 2007, the Holy Land Foundation trial ended in a mistrial. All defendants were convicted upon retrial in 2008.

In 2008, the FBI discontinued its long-standing relationship with CAIR. Officials said the decision followed the conviction of the HLF directors for funneling millions of dollars to Hamas, revelations that Nihal Awad had participated in planning meetings with HLF, and CAIR's failure to provide details of its ties to Hamas. During a 2008 retrial of the HLF case, FBI Special Agent Lara Burns labeled CAIR "a front group for Hamas". In January 2009, the FBI's DC office instructed all field offices to cut ties with CAIR, as the ban extended into the Obama administration.

U.S. Congressmen Sue Myrick (R-N.C.), Trent Franks (R-Ariz.), John Shadegg (R-Ariz.), and Paul Broun (R-Ga.) wrote Attorney General Eric Holder on October 21, 2009, that they were concerned about CAIR's relationships with terrorist groups, and requesting that the Department of Justice (DOJ) provide a summary of DOJ's evidence and findings that led DOJ to name CAIR an unindicted co-conspirator in the Holy Land Foundation terrorism trial. The four Congressmen also wrote House of Representatives Sergeant at Arms Wilson Livingood a letter the same day asking that he work with members of the House Judiciary, Homeland Security, and Intelligence Committees to determine if CAIR was successful in placing interns in the committees' offices, to review FBI and DOJ evidence regarding CAIR's Hamas ties, and to determine whether CAIR is a security threat. Congresswoman Loretta Sanchez (D-Calif.), "appalled", said "I urge the rest of my colleagues to join me in denouncing this witch hunt." She was echoed by Keith Ellison (D-Minn.), the first Muslim elected to the U.S. Congress, in a speech that included a statement by the House's Tri-Caucus. The four Republican Congressmen, joined by Senator Tom Coburn (R-Okla.) and Congressman Patrick McHenry (R-N.C.), then wrote IRS Commissioner Douglas H. Shulman on November 16, 2009, asking that CAIR be investigated for "excessive lobbying". CAIR spokesman Ibrahim Hooper welcomed the scrutiny from Republican lawmakers, and said, "We've always stayed within our legal limits [for lobbying]. If anything, we don't have enough staff to lobby as much as we legally can."

In 2009, CAIR and two other organizations requested a federal judge to expunge the designation of their organizations as unindicted co-conspirators. The judge ruled that the federal prosecutors should have filed the list of unindicted co-conspirators under seal, and the organizations' due process rights under the Fifth Amendment were violated by the public naming, but did not expunge the designation.

=== 2009 to present ===
CAIR condemned the Fort Hood shooting in 2009 and expressed prayers for the victims and condolences for their families.

CAIR pointed to an arrest of five men in Pakistan on December 10, 2009, as a "success story" between Muslims and Muslim community organizations (like CAIR) and American law enforcement authorities. When the five men left Washington for Karachi on November 28, the families of the men discovered an extremist videotape. Worried, they contacted CAIR, which set up a meeting with the FBI on December 1, and the families shared their sons' computers and electronic devices with FBI agents. A U.S. law enforcement official described them as models of cooperation. CAIR hoped the event would ease "strained" relations of American Muslims with the FBI.

In January 2012, CAIR's Michigan chapter took a stance along with the American-Arab Anti-Discrimination Committee in defending four Muslim high school football players accused of attacking a quarterback during a game. The players were allegedly targeted for criminal prosecution over the attack because of their ethnic origin. A judge later dropped the charges after deciding they had no merit.

CAIR has opposed proposed United States legislation and executive orders which would have designated the Muslim Brotherhood as a foreign terrorist organization, saying that such a designation would "inevitably be used in a political campaign to attack those same groups and individuals, to marginalize the American Muslim community and to demonize Islam".

In 2021, at the American Muslims for Palestine’s 14th annual convention, the director of the San Francisco chapter of CAIR, Zahra Billoo, gave a speech in which she said, "I also want us to pay attention to the polite Zionists, the ones that say, let’s just break bread together. We oppose a Muslim ban in the United States, but we cannot support Palestinian human rights. We need to pay attention to the Anti-Defamation League. We need to pay attention to the Jewish Federation. We need to pay attention to the Zionist synagogues. We need to pay attention to the Hillel chapters on our campuses. Because just because they’re your friend today, doesn’t mean that they have your back when it comes to human rights. [...] I mean the Zionist organizations; I mean the foreign-policy organizations who say they’re not Zionist but want a two-state solution. I’m not a Palestinian myself, but it’s my understanding that that is laughable." In response, Jonathan Greenblatt, CEO of the ADL, called her speech "textbook vile, anti-Semitic, conspiracy-laden garbage". On December 11, CAIR released a statement in support of Billoo, writing that her remarks were being frequently taken out of context and noting that "Zahra praised the many Jewish activists and groups that support human rights for all people, including Palestinians, and specifically encouraged Muslims to engage in interfaith collaboration with Jewish organizations such as IfNotNow and Jewish Voice for Peace."

In October 2025, CAIR-Ohio Director, Khaled Tuurani, participated in an online conference hosted by the Al-Zaytouna Center in Beirut which included Majed al-Zeer, a Palestinian activist who was designated by the U.S. government in 2024 as a Specially Designated Terrorist for his alleged role in Hamas fundraising efforts. The two reportedly appeared on separate panels. The title of the event was, "Palestinians Abroad and Regional and International Strategic Transformations in the Light of Al-Aqsa Flood."

In December 2025, president Donald Trump made anti-Somali comments about Somalis and Somali-Americans, calling them garbage, and saying he wants all Somalis to be deported back to the Horn of Africa. In the aftermath, some female Somali Americans or female Horner Americans in Minnesota have stated that they've been religiously harassed with comments about their hijab, and others have been sexually assaulted by members of the U.S. ICE agency. In response, an official press release by CAIR stated that it condemned Trump's comments about people of Somali descent, referring to the comments as "vile". In late December 2025, United States Director of National Intelligence, Tulsi Gabbard referred to a conference that CAIR attended earlier in 2025 that she alleged "issued a call to action to use American legal and political systems to implement Sharia law".

== Projects and media ==
Local CAIR chapters such as the Michigan chapter organized a "Remember Through Service" campaign which was a video and billboard media campaign which featured positive representations of Muslim-Americans including a Muslim first responder during the September 11 World Trade Center events.

== Litigation ==
=== Workplace discrimination ===
One of the largest categories of cases CAIR deals with is workplace discrimination. CAIR has filed successful civil rights litigation on behalf of Muslim Americans who suffered employment discrimination due to their religion, including police officers and hospital workers. CAIR also filed an amicus brief on behalf of the plaintiff to the Supreme Court of the United States for Equal Employment Opportunity Commission v. Abercrombie & Fitch Stores, in which the Court ruled 8–1 that refusing to hire a woman because she may wear her hijab at the workplace amounts to religious discrimination in hiring.

=== Local government ===
In 2012, after the City Council in St. Anthony, Minnesota, voted 4–1 to reject a building plan for the Abu-Huraira Islamic Center, CAIR began legal proceedings and urged the federal government to investigate the city for violating the Religious Land Use and Institutionalized Persons Act. In 2014, the city agreed to a settlement after a federal lawsuit was opened against them, allowing the Abu-Huraira Islamic Center to begin services. CAIR also helped the American Islamic Center (AIC) file a complaint against the city of Des Plaines, Illinois, to the US Department of Justice after the city refused to allow the AIC to operate its place of worship. After a federal suit was filed, the city agreed to pay $580,000 to the AIC in a settlement agreement.

In 2012, CAIR successfully filed suit striking down State Question 755, a ban on Sharia law in Oklahoma on grounds that it violated the First Amendment right to free exercise of religion.

In 2017, CAIR secured an $85,000 settlement for Kirsty Powell, whose hijab was forcibly removed by police while in custody.

=== Federal government ===
CAIR has been involved in legal action against the US Government on several occasions. In 2003, CAIR along with the American-Arab Anti-Discrimination Committee filed suit in Muslim Community Association of Ann Arbor v. Ashcroft, which challenged the constitutionality of the USA PATRIOT Act. The case forced Congress to make substantial changes to Section 215 of the act, which helped it avoid being in violation of the First Amendment and had the effect of resolving the lawsuit. CAIR also filed amicus briefs against US President Donald Trump over Executive Order 13769 and Executive Order 13780, which banned all travellers and temporary visa holders of 7 Muslim-majority countries, as well as all refugees, from entering the United States. CAIR began maintaining a group of immigration lawyers in Chicago O'Hare airport after Executive Order 13769 went into effect and caused the immediate revocation of over 100,000 temporary visas.

CAIR litigated on behalf of Gulet Mohamed, a 19-year-old Virginia teenager who was kidnapped and tortured in Kuwait after the FBI placed him on a no-fly list. CAIR argued successfully that the teen's placement on the US no-fly list was "patently unconstitutional" and that Mohamed had a constitutional right to come home.

=== Muslim Mafia lawsuit ===
The 2009 book Muslim Mafia: Inside the Secret Underworld That's Conspiring to Islamize America by Paul David Gaubatz and Paul E. Sperry portrays CAIR "as a subversive organization allied with international terrorists".

Consequently, CAIR brought a federal civil lawsuit in 2009 against Gaubatz and his son for allegedly stealing documents Gaubatz relied on for his book. U.S. District Judge Colleen Kollar-Kotelly concluded that the Gaubatzes "unlawfully obtained access to, and have already caused repeated public disclosure of, material containing CAIR's proprietary, confidential and privileged information", which CAIR says included CAIR employees' and donors' names, addresses, telephone numbers and email addresses. As a result, Kollar-Kotelly ordered Gaubatz to remove certain documents from his website. She also said that CAIR's employees had reported a dramatic increase in threatening communications since Gaubatz's book was released.

== Operations ==
CAIR's stated goal is to promote understanding of Islam and protect the civil liberties of Muslims. It has intervened on behalf of many Muslim Americans who face discrimination, profiling, or harassment.

== Concerns and incidents ==
=== Anti-Zionism ===
Organizations such as the Anti-Defamation League (ADL) have accused CAIR of engaging in antisemitism due to the organization's anti-zionist advocacy.

In September 2025, after the Philadelphia chapter of CAIR announced that it was partnering with K–12 schools in Philadelphia and Delaware to "make sure every student feels seen, safe, and supported" by offering "training to educators and staff on cultural competency, anti-bullying, and inclusive practices", Senator Tom Cotton petitioned Department of Education Secretary Linda McMahon to investigate the partnership and accused CAIR of pushing "anti-Israel, radical, and pro-terror ideology". House Education and Workforce Committee Chairman Tim Walberg subsequently expressed similar concerns about CAIR's educational partnerships, calling them "deeply troubling given CAIR's ties to terrorism and antisemitism".

In October 2025, Cotton and Representative Elise Stefanik asked Treasury Secretary Scott Bessent to investigate whether CAIR has financial links to Hamas, which would be a violation of U.S. sanctions. Earlier, Cotton, chairman of the Senate Republican Conference, had also urged the IRS to investigate CAIR's tax-exempt status. In a letter to Bessent, CAIR responded: "Mr. Cotton and Ms. Stefanik's demand that Treasury target our civil rights organization is baseless. It has nothing to do with national security and everything to do with anti-Muslim and anti-Palestinian bigotry."

=== Sexual harassment and gender discrimination allegations ===
In 2021, Hassan Shibly resigned from his position as executive director of the Florida chapter of CAIR after his estranged wife publicly accused him of abuse and of financially cutting off her and their three children. Following this, several women who had worked with Shibly also came forward, accusing him of sexual harassment and emotional abuse. Shibly denied these allegations. However, the women also alleged workplace discrimination at CAIR's national office and at several prominent chapters. NPR reported: "When concerned parties brought allegations to senior CAIR officials in Washington, D.C., and Florida, former employees said, there was little, if any, follow-up action. They said leaders were aware of some of the allegations as early as 2016." NPR "interviewed 18 former employees at the national office and several prominent chapters who said there was a general lack of accountability when it came to perceived gender bias, religious bias or mismanagement".

=== Labor organizing ===
NPR's investigation reported that CAIR "thwart[ed] employees' efforts to unionize in the national office in 2016". "Service Employees International Union Local 500 said in filings Wednesday that the Council on American-Islamic Relations was trying to bust its effort to organize the civil rights group's staff. CAIR responded with a statement Thursday calling the charge 'meritless'."

=== LGBT rights ===
In 2016, in the wake of the Pulse nightclub shooting, CAIR representatives met with LGBT leaders to condemn the attack, gather in solidarity, and voice their support for LGBT rights. CAIR Sacramento director Basim Elkarra also released a statement offering "support and allyship to the LGBTQ community, which has been a faithful ally against Islamophobia." CAIR director Nihad Awad also voiced his support, saying that American "Muslims stand united" with the LGBT community.

In Michigan, CAIR voiced concerns over a 2023 amendment to the Elliott-Larsen Civil Rights Act, advocating that the amendment's LGBT rights provisions include faith protections.

The same year, CAIR and several other Muslim organizations opposed mandatory "sexually themed lessons" in Montgomery County, Maryland. These lessons include LGBT-inclusive content. CAIR issued a statement saying parents should be notified in advance so their children can opt out of "sexually themed content". CAIR released a statement saying, "Schools should respect their authority by restoring the option to opt their children out of reading sexually-themed content or participating in sexually-themed lessons and discussions, without any adverse consequences."

== Designation as terrorist organization ==
The United Arab Emirates, Texas, and Florida have designated CAIR as a terrorist organization.

=== By the UAE ===
In November 2014, CAIR was designated a terrorist organization by the United Arab Emirates, which claimed that the organization has ties to the Muslim Brotherhood.

CAIR called the move "shocking and bizarre", and some international American terrorism analysts were also critical. The Washington Post wrote: "CAIR and the Muslim American Society are not alone in their shock. Diverse groups across Europe were also added to the list, leaving many observers perplexed at the scope and sheer scale of the list. Norway's foreign ministry publicly requested an explanation as to why one of the country's largest Islamic groups, the Islamic Organization, was included, and the U.S. State Department said they would be seeking more information from the U.A.E." In January 2015, CAIR said it would seek to appeal the designation in the UAE. CAIR has criticized UAE for targeting and detaining American Muslims, such as the civil rights attorney and human rights activist Asim Ghafoor, the former attorney of Jamal Khashoggi, the Washington Post journalist assassinated by agents of the Saudi government in the Saudi consulate in Istanbul. Ghafoor helped establish the organization Democracy for the Arab World Now (DAWN), which has worked on human rights violations in the UAE. CAIR said, "The real reason the UAE targeted Ghafoor became even clearer when Emirati media outlets began publishing unhinged, Islamophobic hit-pieces slandering him as a 'terrorist' for his pro-democracy work with DAWN and other groups." It added that "the UAE's history targeting American Muslims" is part of a effort to spread authoritarianism in the Middle East.

UAE Minister of State for Foreign Affairs Anwar Gargash rejected criticism of the designation, saying that "The noise [by] some Western organizations over the UAE's terrorism list originates in groups that are linked to the Muslim Brotherhood and many of them work on incitement and creating an environment of extremism."

=== By US state governments ===
In 1994, during a talk about the situation in the Palestinian occupied territories, CAIR's executive director Nihad Awad said he supported the social programs Hamas provided to Palestinians over those supplied by the Palestine Liberation Organization (PLO). Awad later clarified that he did reject the more "radical" elements of the group, and in 2006, he disavowed Hamas entirely. Several individual CAIR members have been indicted on terrorism-related charges.

In 2004, the Bush Administration decided not to indict CAIR on criminal charges for its alleged support of Hamas. The decision came as prosecutors were building a case against the Holy Land Foundation, an Islamic charity with connections to CAIR that was charged with funding Hamas in 2008.

In 2007, an award honoring Basim Elkarra, the executive director of CAIR's Sacramento chapter, was rescinded. Barbara Boxer, who initially granted Elkarra the certificate, said it was rescinded because CAIR had not designated Hamas and Hezbollah as terrorist organizations. After the award was rescinded, the FBI investigated threats made on Elkarra's life in response to the incident.

In 2008, during the trial of the United States versus the Holy Land Foundation for Relief and Development, FBI agent Lara Burns accused CAIR of being a front group for Hamas. CAIR was one of the 300 or so unindicted groups labeled as "co-conspirators" in the case.

In 2017, Ohio Republican Josh Mandel said, "CAIR is Hamas." A day later, he also accused CAIR of being connected to the Muslim Brotherhood.

The federal government of the United States has not listed CAIR as a terrorist organization, but some U.S. state governments have.

On November 18, 2025, Texas Governor Greg Abbott officially declared CAIR a foreign terrorist organization, saying it had direct ties to Hamas. In his proclamation, Abbott accused the Muslim Brotherhood and CAIR of supporting terrorism internationally and promoting the implementation of sharia law. He also referenced alleged links between CAIR, Hamas, and individuals previously convicted on terrorism-related charges. The designation means CAIR may not acquire land in Texas. On December 9, 2025, Florida Governor Ron DeSantis designated CAIR a "foreign terrorist organization", along with the Muslim Brotherhood. In November 2026, CAIR suspended operations in Florida after a Federal Judge denied CAIR and CAIR Florida’s request to reverse the designation.

== Reception ==
U.S. Senator Barbara Boxer's 2006 decision to withdraw a "certificate of accomplishment" originally given to former CAIR official Basim Elkarra on grounds of suspicions about the organization's background "provoked an outcry from organizations that vouch for the group's advocacy, including the ACLU and the California Council of Churches." Maya Harris, executive director of the ACLU of Northern California, criticized Senator Boxer's decision and added that CAIR has "been a leading organization that has advocated for civil rights and civil liberties in the face of fear and intolerance, in the face of religious and ethnic profiling."

Pulitzer Prize-winning journalist Nicholas Kristof advocated for people to support and sign up as members of CAIR in response to the 2016 election of US President Donald Trump.

In 2016, the University of Saint Thomas named the Minnesota branch of CAIR as the winner of its Winds of Change Award at its Forum on Workplace Inclusion.

The Seattle chapter of the League of Women Voters awarded the Washington branch of CAIR one of its 2015 Champion of Voting and Civil Rights Awards, praising "their work encouraging voting and community involvement by members of the Muslim American community".

== Funding ==
In 2007 CAIR had an annual budget of around $3 million. It states that while the majority of its funding comes from American Muslims, it accepts donations from individuals of any faith and also foreigners. In the past CAIR has accepted donations from individuals and foundations close to Arab governments, including major donations for special projects, like a five hundred thousand donation from Prince Alwaleed bin Talal of Saudi Arabia. Within CAIR there is debate regarding foreign funding, and several CAIR branches have criticized the national office for accepting foreign donations.

In April 2011, Rep. Frank Wolf, R-Va. cited a 2009 letter sent from CAIR's executive director, Nihad Awad, to Muammar Gaddafi asking Gaddafi for funding for a project called the Muslim Peace Foundation at a U.S. House of Representatives Appropriations sub-committee hearing. Steven Emerson called the funding request "hypocritical", while CAIR spokesman, Ibrahim Hooper, said that the Muslim Peace Foundation was Awad's personal initiative "unrelated to CAIR", that CAIR didn't receive any money from the Libyan government, and also that CAIR was one of the first American organizations to call for a no-fly zone to protect Libyan citizens from Gaddafi during the 2011 Libyan Civil War.

== See also ==
- American Muslim Council
- Arab American Institute
- Muslim Public Affairs Council
- National Council of Canadian Muslims
