= Rafiq Jaber =

American activist

Rafiq Jaber (Arabic: رفيق جابر, Levantine Arabic IPA: [raˈfiːʔ ˈʒaːber]; b. in Ramallah), whose name is also transliterated as Rafeeq Jaber, is an Arab Muslim activist. He immigrated to the United States in 1974.

He is married with three daughters and owns Jaber Financial Services.

He lectures throughout the U.S. on university and college campuses. He is a cofounder of the Council on American Islamic Relations. He was the President from 1994–2005 of the Islamic Association for Palestine (IAC), an Islamist organization that raised money in the United States for Hamas.

Jaber formed and was President of the American Muslim Society (AMS) from its inception in 1993 to at least 2003; he also served as President of the Islamic Association for Palestine (IAP) National from 1996 to 1998, and then again from 1999 to at least 2003, and as the President of IAP Texas from 2002 to at least 2003. For a time, IAP also used the name American Muslim Society.

IAP National, under his leadership, published articles and editorials characterizing suicide bombers and those who carried out bombing operations against Israeli targets as "martyrs" and "freedom fighters," though he claimed that IAP took no official position on the validity of those characterizations. Jaber said that IAP takes no position on whether suicide bombings are right or wrong, "because we do not judge. I don't believe we are in a position to judge the people what they do and what they do not do. Because the one in the field is different than the one sitting in the chair like me here." He, IAP, and AMS recommended the Holy Land Foundation (HLF) to people desiring to make donations to the Palestinian cause and worked to promote HLF in any way they could. He is one of the founders of the Muslim Civil Center in Chicago, the United Muslim American Association, the American Muslim Society in Illinois, and Christian Muslim Dialog in Illinois. He also served as President of the Bridgeview Mosque/Mosque Foundation in Illinois for two years.
