= David Sumberg =

British politician (born 1941)

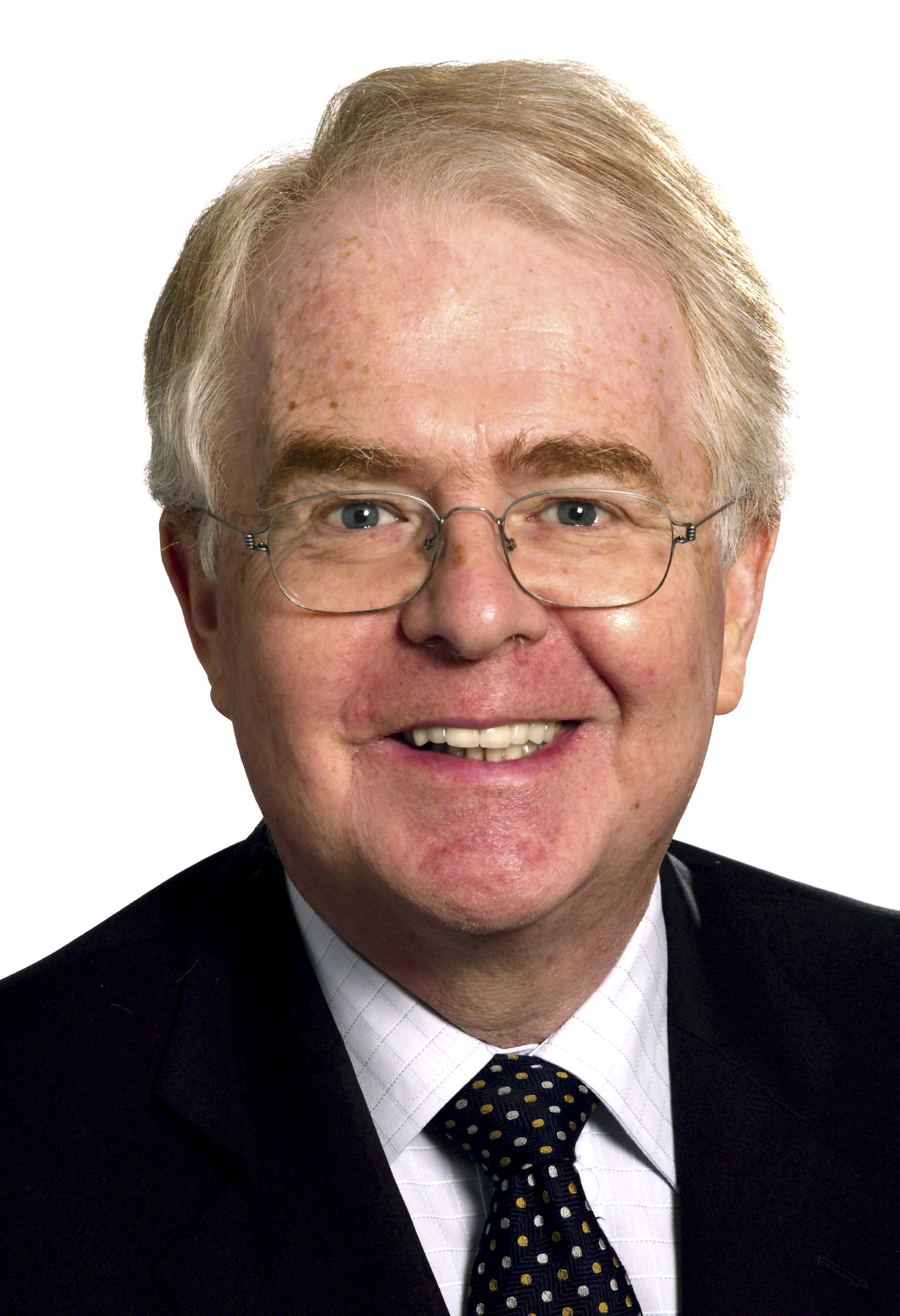
- Sumberg in 2004

Member of the European Parliament for North West England
- In office 1999–2009
- Preceded by: Constituency created
- Succeeded by: Jacqueline Foster

Member of Parliament for Bury South
- In office 9 June 1983 – 8 April 1997
- Preceded by: Constituency created
- Succeeded by: Ivan Lewis

Personal details
- Born: 2 June 1941 (age 85) Stoke-on-Trent, England
- Party: Conservative
- Education: University of Manchester

David Anthony Gerald Sumberg (born 2 June 1941) is a British politician, and former Member of the European Parliament for the North West England region for the Conservative Party. He was first elected to the European Parliament in 1999 and stood down in 2009. Before this he was the Member of Parliament for Bury South, north of Manchester, from 1983 to 1997 when he lost in the Labour landslide to Ivan Lewis.

== Political life ==
Prior to his election to Westminster, he stood unsuccessfully for Manchester Wythenshawe in 1979, being beaten by Labour's Alf Morris. He had also been a Manchester City Councillor for Brooklands ward in Wythenshawe. As an MP he acted as the Parliamentary Private Secretary for the Attorney General, Sir Patrick Mayhew. He seconded the Loyal Humble Address of Ian Gow MP in November 1989; a privilege that was traditionally afforded only once to an MP. He held on to his seat in 1992 with a majority of 788 votes over Labour's Hazel Blears, making Bury South one of the most marginal in the country.

He has been criticised by members of other political parties and the national media for his low attendance and political inactivity in the European Parliament. He tabled only five questions and has not written any of the reports or tabled any resolutions to the one committee he sat on. When he stepped down from the European Parliament, he explained that as an MEP, he was "not a signed up member" of the "European Project" and did not support a more centralised European Union, "unlike most of my MEP colleagues".

He paid his wife £54,000 per year from the staff allowance and claimed £40,000 per year in office expenses; he used the North West England Conservative Campaigns Centre as a forwarding address to his house in north London, where he claimed the expenses.

Parliament of the United Kingdom
New constituency	Member of Parliament for Bury South; 1983–1997	Succeeded by Ivan Lewis
