= Drinkwater Park =

Woodland park in Greater Manchester, England

Coordinates: 53°31′16″N 2°17′56″W

Drinkwater Park is situated in the Irwell Valley on the western border of Prestwich, near Manchester, bounded by the River Irwell to the west, Agecroft Road and Rainsough Brow (A6044) to the south, Butterstile Lane and Carr Clough estate to the east and Bunkers Hill to the north. The park is administered by Forestry England and is part of Prestwich Forest Park, which also incorporates Philips Park, Mere Clough, Prestwich Clough, Forest Bank Park in Pendlebury and Waterdale Meadow.

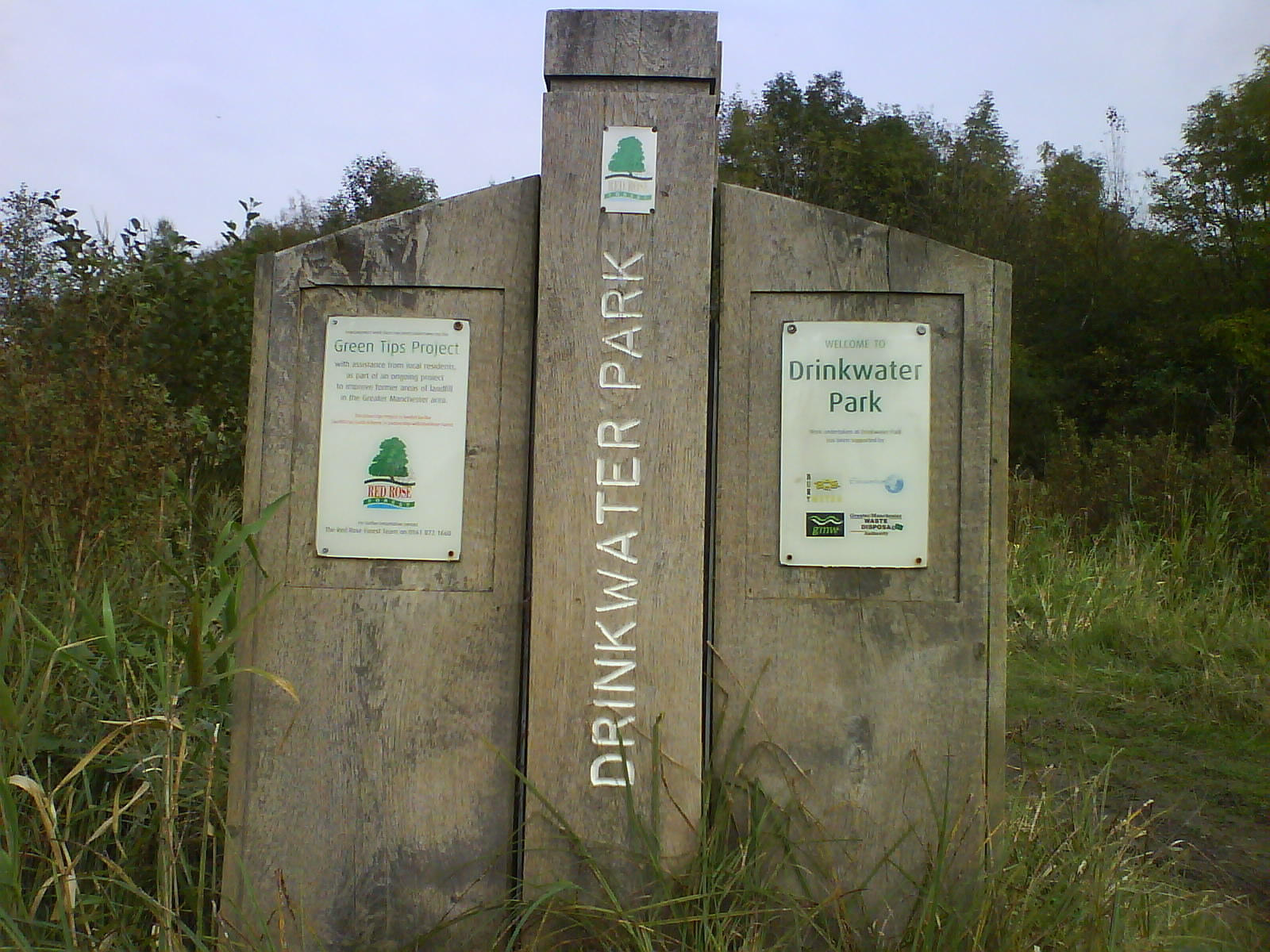
Drinkwater Park sign

== Geography ==
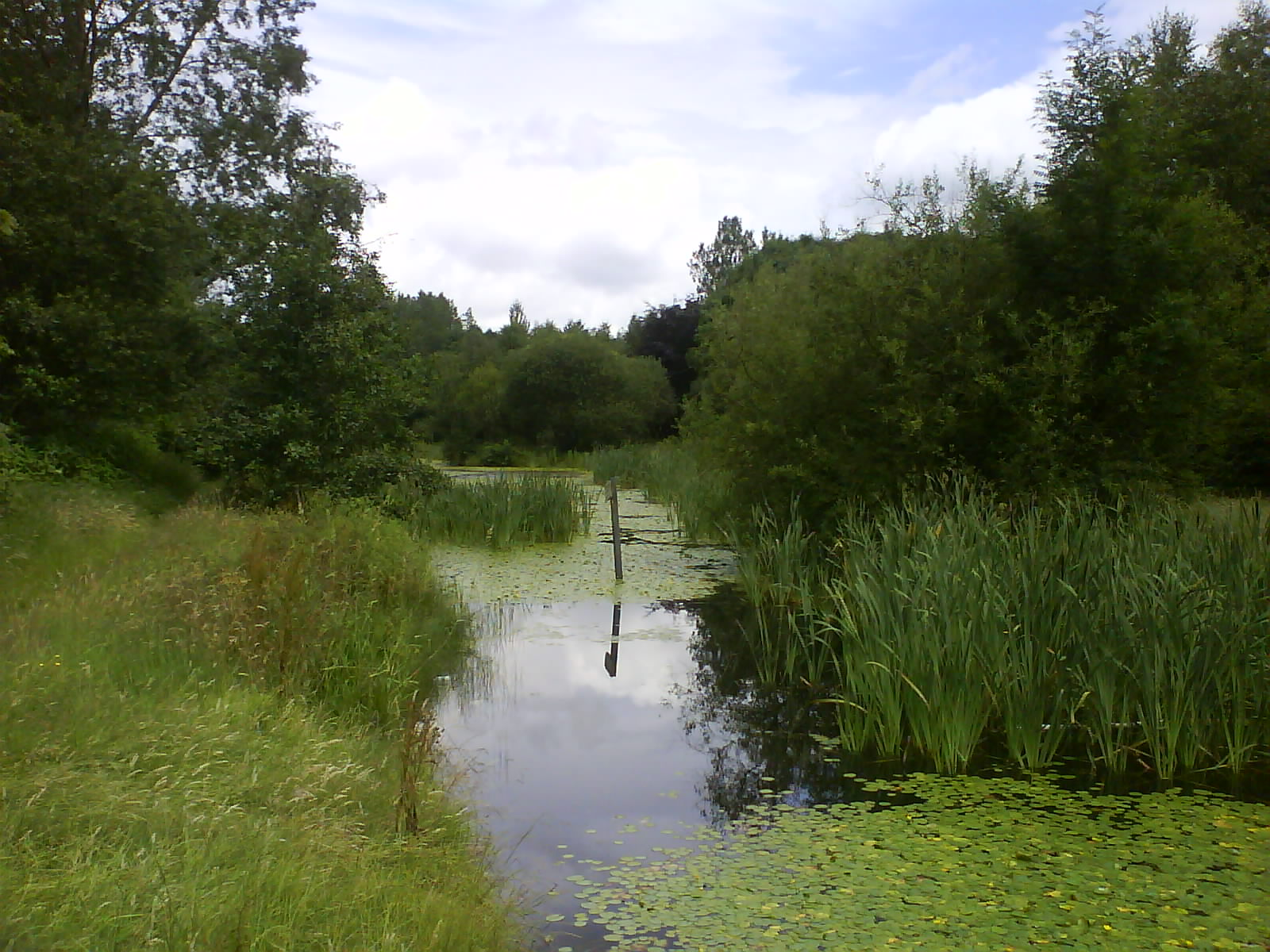
View from the bridge

Much of Drinkwater Park is very flat as it is on the flood-plain of the River Irwell but the valley rises steeply to the east in the area known as Carr Clough. There is a long narrow reservoir running up the centre of the park which, on the 1894 map, appears to have been used as a water supply for the Clough Bleach and Dye Works, although the narrow northern arm has long since been culverted. Most of the land in the park was very open and windswept until the early 1990s, as can be seen on the 1982 photograph by John Davies. Since that time there has been a programme of tree planting carried out as part of the Red Rose Forest Scheme. Most of the park, apart from the football playing fields, is now thickly wooded with a diverse selection of broadleaved trees.

The area to the northeast owned by Greater Manchester Waste Disposal Authority, was used as a landfill area from 1946 to 1983 but has since been planted with trees as part of the "Green Tips Project" for landfill areas in Greater Manchester. The main paths have been gravelled and some raised decking paths have been erected across the wetland areas to the east of the reservoir. The only vehicular entrance to the park is on the south side from the roundabout at the junction of Agecroft Road, Kersal Vale Road and Rainsough Brow, which leads to the car park. The other entrances are only accessible by pedestrians or cyclists. A Greater Manchester Waste Disposal Authority recycling centre was formerly located at the northern end of the park, accessed via Buckley Lane. This facility was closed in 2011.

== History ==
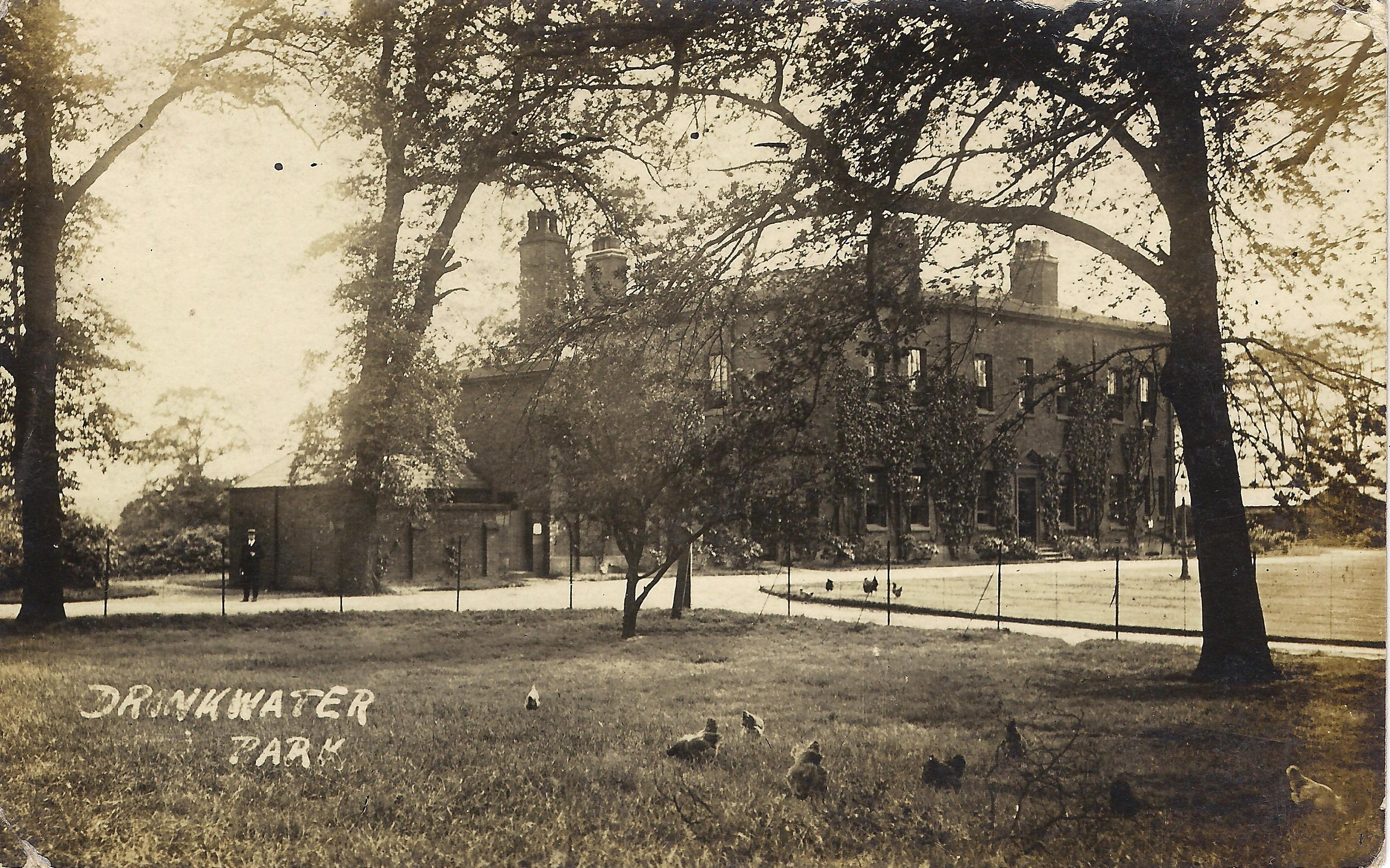
Irwell House Isolation Hospital circa 1921

In 1389 the Langleys of Agecroft Hall acquired the land which was farmed as part of the medieval estate of Robert de Prestwich. The Manor of Prestwich remained with the Langley family until 1561 when it was passed on by marriage to the Coke family. In 1777 Thomas William Coke, wishing to increase his Norfolk estates began to sell off the Manor of Prestwich and Peter Drinkwater, son of Thomas Drinkwater of Whalley, bought the Manor in 1794. Peter, a prominent Manchester textile mill owner, owned a town house in Manchester but resided during the summer months at Irwell House, a Georgian mansion, built around 1790 alongside the River Irwell. When Peter's son Robert died in 1861 his lands, including Irwell House, were left to his daughters. Irwell House and the land, known as Drinkwater Park were sold to Salford and Prestwich councils in 1902. Irwell House was converted to a smallpox hospital for which it was ideally suited due to its isolated position. It was later abandoned and fell into disrepair. In 1958 the house caught fire during a civil defence exercise and was demolished some years later. The foundations and the first course of stones were left in place and are still visible today, as are the overgrown remnants of the gardens.

The Ordnance Survey map of 1907 shows Drinkwater Farm located immediately to the west of what is now the northern end of the reservoir and a lodge approximately 500 feet (152.4 m) to the east of the farm, at the end of a narrow arm of the reservoir. However, both these buildings and the stretch of water that joined them have disappeared. For many years there was a sewage farm in the north of the park alongside Buckley Lane but this has now gone leaving only the lines of the walls and some evidence of the lagoons. There is now a pumping station just to the west of the site.

Prestwich became part of the Metropolitan Borough of Bury in 1974.

== Flora and fauna ==
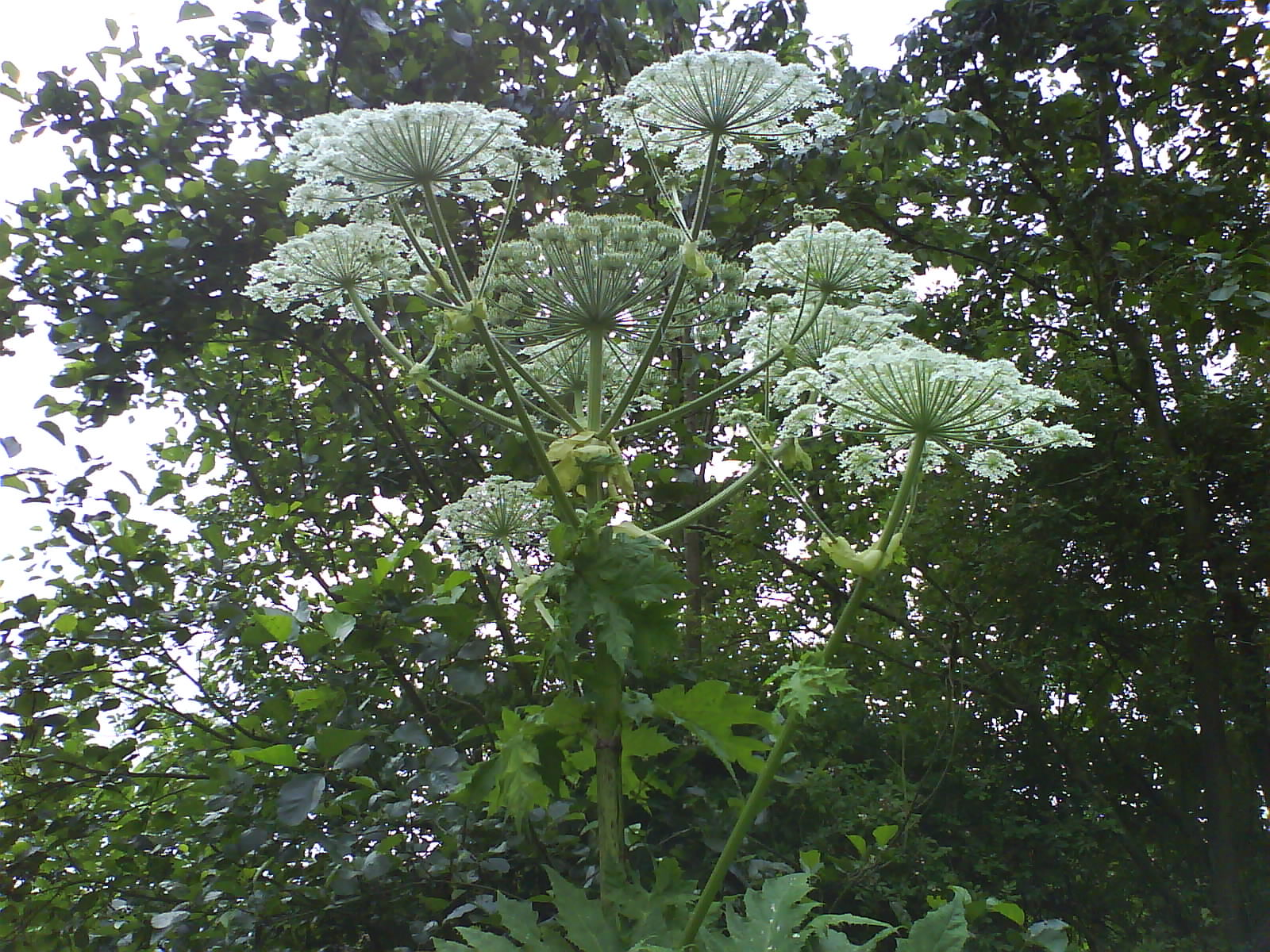
Giant hogweed

There are broadleaved trees to be found in the park, as well as native shrubs such as elder, bramble, wild rose and guelder rose. Large swathes of bluebells are to be seen flowering in the spring on the slopes to the east, followed by ferns and bracken in the summer. Species of mosses and fungi are to be found across the park. There are also foreign invaders such as Himalayan balsam and the toxic giant hogweed.

Foxes and rabbits are much in evidence and deer are occasionally seen. The wetlands to the east of the reservoir are home to colonies of frogs, and toads also breed in the park. There are waterfowl on the reservoir including coots, moorhens, mallards, swans and occasional flocks of Canada geese. Kingfishers and heron nest in the park as do magpies and species of smaller birds such as tits and finches. Insects abound, especially dragonflies, damselflies and butterflies. The reservoir is stocked with freshwater fish and is home to an array of pondlife such as newts, water boatmen, pondskaters and the endangered freshwater pearl mussel.

== Activities ==
There are well-maintained football pitches in the park with changing rooms and showers near to the Rainsough entrance. Amateur teams play at the weekends including Bury Amateur AFC where a number of fans come down on a Saturday afternoon.

In October 2003 a skate park was opened near the Rainsough entrance by the mayor and mayoress of Bury. The facility was built as a result of a partnership between Bury Council, youth services, Rainsough Tenants' and Residents' Association, Prestwich Area Board, the police and Community Safety Partnership and the youngsters themselves. The skate park plan was backed by Rainsough TRA who put in a successful bid for funding with the Local Network Fund.

Forestry England encourage schools to arrange environmental activities such as pond dipping in the park.

Salford Friendly Anglers Society have fishing rights on the lake and anglers are often seen on the banks.

The park is popular with local dog walkers, horse riders, cyclists and joggers.

The Irwell Sculpture Trail, the longest sculpture trail in Europe, passes through the park, although there are no sculptures in the park itself. The trail follows the footpaths of the Irwell Valley Way from Salford Quays to the Rossendale Valley and up into the Pennine Moors above Bacup.

National Route 6 of the National Cycle Network passes through the park.

Forestry England organise various events and activities in the park.

== The future of the park ==
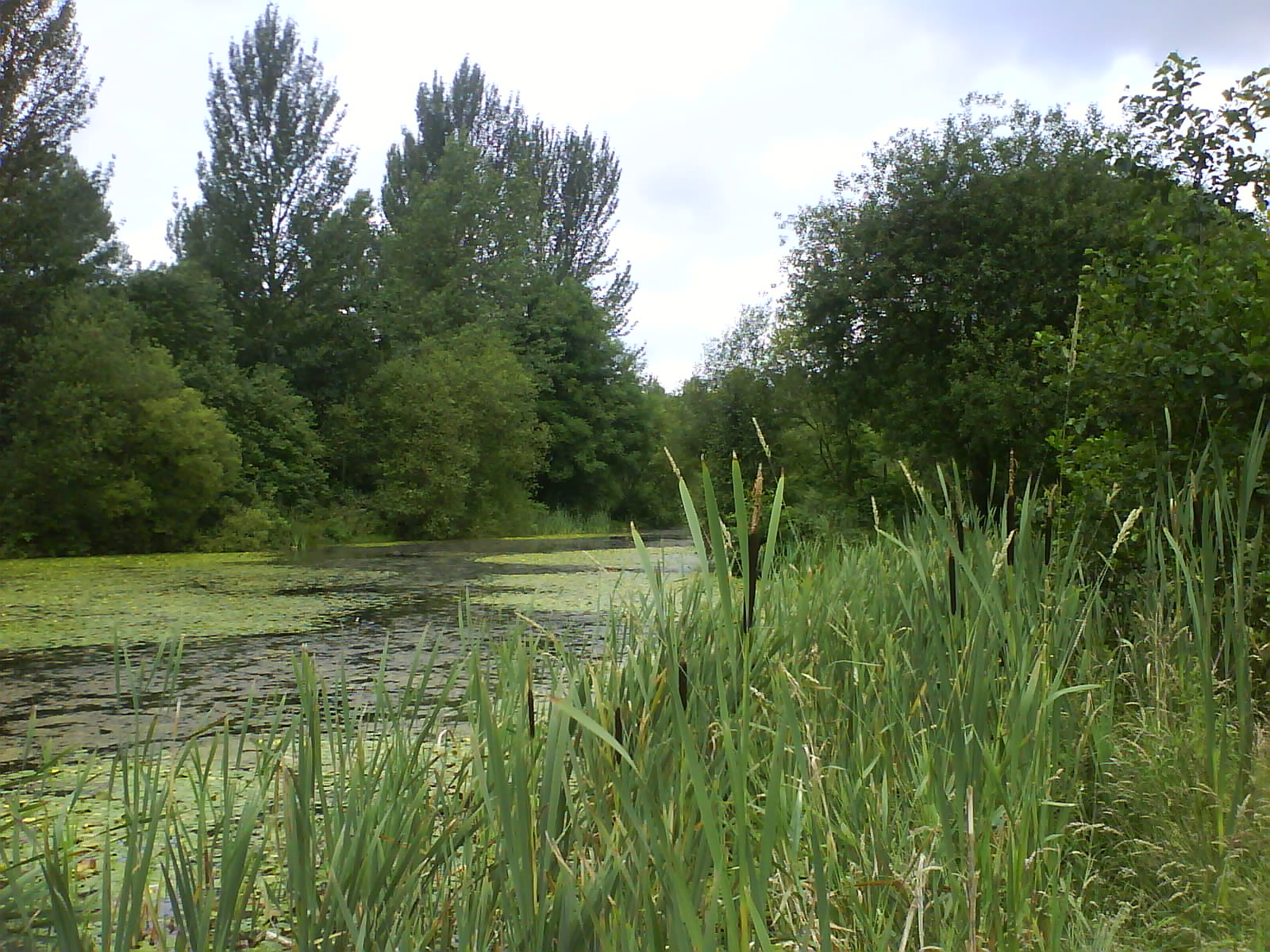
Drinkwater Park in August

The Croal Irwell Regional Park Project Proposal to create a green artery from the centre of Manchester to the West Pennine Moors was announced in June 2003 supported by Salford, Bury and Bolton councils and the Red Rose Forest. This project, which includes Drinkwater Park, aims to:

create a regional "First Impressions" gateway to Manchester providing a high quality, dynamic and exciting exemplar of mutifunctional rural/urban fringe regeneration.

and

To develop a strategic multifunctional sustainable approach to the long term land management, planning and development of this important area of land running from the heart of Manchester to the West Pennine Moors
