= Omar Ahmad =

American activist; co-founder of CAIR (born 1959)

- Born: 1959 (age 66–67); Amman, Jordan
- Education: Santa Clara University
- Occupations: Businessman, founder of Council on American-Islamic Relations

Omar Ahmad (Arabic: عمر أحمد; born 1959) is the founder of the Council on American-Islamic Relations (CAIR), a Washington D.C.–based Muslim civil rights organization. He also worked for the Islamic Association of Palestine, a precursor to CAIR.

== Biography ==
He was born in Amman, Jordan. He holds a master's degree in computer science from Santa Clara University as well as a master's degree in political science.

He had been the chairman of CAIR's board of directors since its founding in 1994, but stepped down from that position in May 2005. At the time that he resigned, CAIR claimed to be the largest Muslim civil liberties organization in the United States, with over 30 regional offices and chapters.
