= Prestwich Clough =

Site in Prestwich

Prestwich Clough (referred to locally as "The Clough") is a 24.12 acre Site of Biological Importance situated in Prestwich in Bury, Greater Manchester, in England. It is bounded by Church Lane to the north, Bury New Road to the east, St. Ann's Road to the south and Buckley Lane to the west. It is administered by Bury Metropolitan Borough Council and is part of Prestwich Forest Park, which also incorporates Drinkwater Park, Philips Park, Mere Clough, Forest Bank Park in Pendlebury and Waterdale Meadow.

== History ==
The Clough, opened as a park in 1906, after nine acres were donated to Prestwich Urban District Council by William Gardner and a further 13 acres purchased for £2,000. In 1981, the area was designated as a Site of Biological Importance. The Clough was once home to a bandstand, tea rooms and a bleach and dye works, however they are all no longer present.

== Prestwich Clough Day ==
In 2006, an event was held in the St Mary's Flower Park area of the Clough to celebrate 100 years of its opening. Although this was initially planned as a one-off event, it has been held every year since. The event is usually held during the month of May, however in 2020, due to the COVID-19 pandemic, the event was postponed.
