= Red Rose Forest =

Forest in Greater Manchester, England

Coordinates: 53°30′N 2°30′W

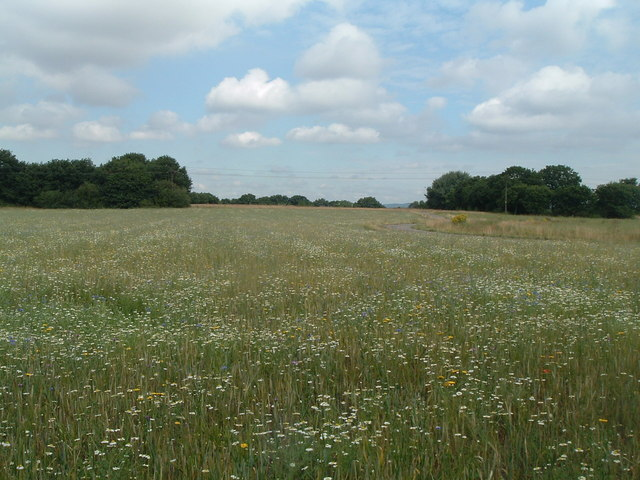
Wild flowers at Byrom Wood. This is farmland in Lowton taken over by the Forestry Commission near to Pennington Flash part of the Red Rose Forest.

Red Rose Forest is the previous name for the charity City of Trees, the charity underwent a rebranding in 2016. City of Trees is the community forest for Greater Manchester, part of a national network of community forests across England - www.communityforest-trust.org

Red Rose Forest was founded as a community forest in western and central Greater Manchester, England. It was established in 1991, as the Greater Manchester Community Forest – one of 12 community forests across England. In 1994 the Red Rose Forest Plan was approved by Government and launched to the public. It aimed to be a mechanism for the economic, social, and environmental regeneration of the countryside around our towns and cities. Achieving this by involving communities in creating and preserving a woodland flora for the future. The population within the forest boundary amounted to 2.5 million, at the time the community was founded, making it the largest urban community forest in the United Kingdom.

The main aim of Red Rose Forest was to get greenery where people can appreciate it every day. This included street trees, green roofs and green spaces. Red Rose Forest's Green Streets team worked with local communities on unique and innovative greening projects to improve the quality of life for urban communities. The value of greening as a means of tackling a range of social, health and economic issues is huge. Red Rose Forest offered many ways for the people to get involved in their environment including the general public through their Friends of the Forest scheme, businesses through sponsorship and communities through the Green Streets project.

== Area covered ==
The forest area under Red Rose Forest covered 292 square miles (760 km^{2}) and took in the districts of Manchester, Salford, Bolton, Bury, Trafford and Wigan.

The population within the forest boundary amounts to 1.5 million, making it the largest urban community forest in the UK.

== Cost ==
Over the 40-year projected lifespan of the project it was planned to plant 25 million trees. For new woodland the costs of planting is between £7 - £10 for each tree as compared to £300 in an urban area. Since the scheme started, as of 2007, 1,183 hectares of woodland had been planted in the forest area.

== Partnership bodies ==
Main Partners	Wider Partnerships
Countryside Agency	Businesses
Forestry Commission	Landowners
Bolton Council	Environmental and voluntary bodies (RSPB, Woodland Trust, BTCV)
Bury Council	Countryside Services
Trafford Council	Schools
Wigan Council	Individuals
Manchester City Council	Local communities
Salford City Council	

== See also ==
- Community Forests in England
