= 2015 Pendle Borough Council election =

Local election in England

Results of the 2015 Pendle Borough Council election

The 2015 Pendle Borough Council election took place on 7 May 2015 to elect members of the Pendle Borough Council in England. It was held on the same day as other local elections.
