= World Leaders =

Public domain directory published by the CIA

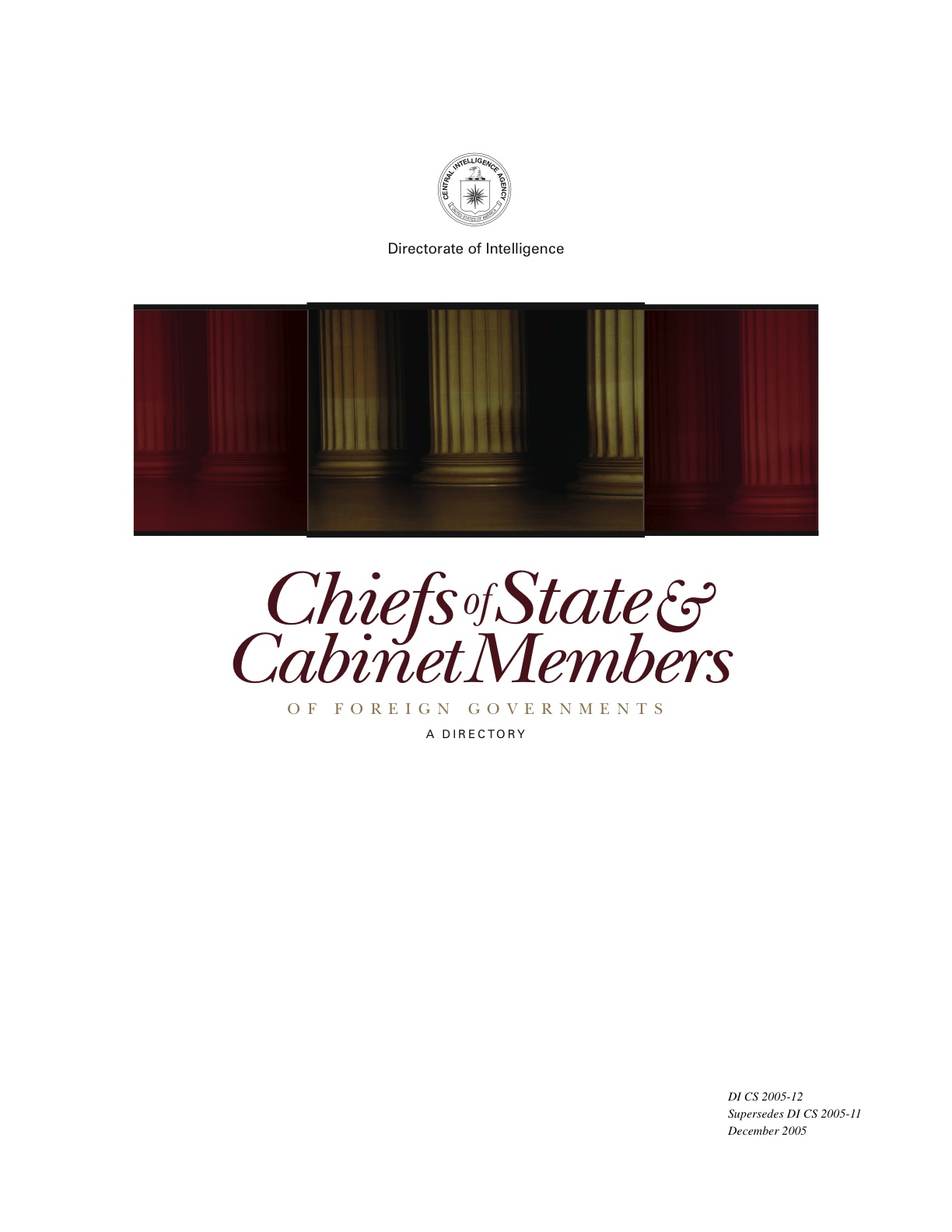
Cover of World Leaders

World Leaders, also known as Chiefs of State and Cabinet Members of Foreign Governments, is a public domain directory published weekly by the United States Central Intelligence Agency. It lists different state officials for each country of the world: the head of state and/or head of government and other cabinet ministers, the chief of the central bank, and the ambassadors to the United Nations and the United States.

== See also ==
- The International Who's Who
- List of current heads of state and government
- National Security Agency academic publications
- World-Check
