= Christian Wakeford =

British politician (born 1984)

Christian Wakeford MP
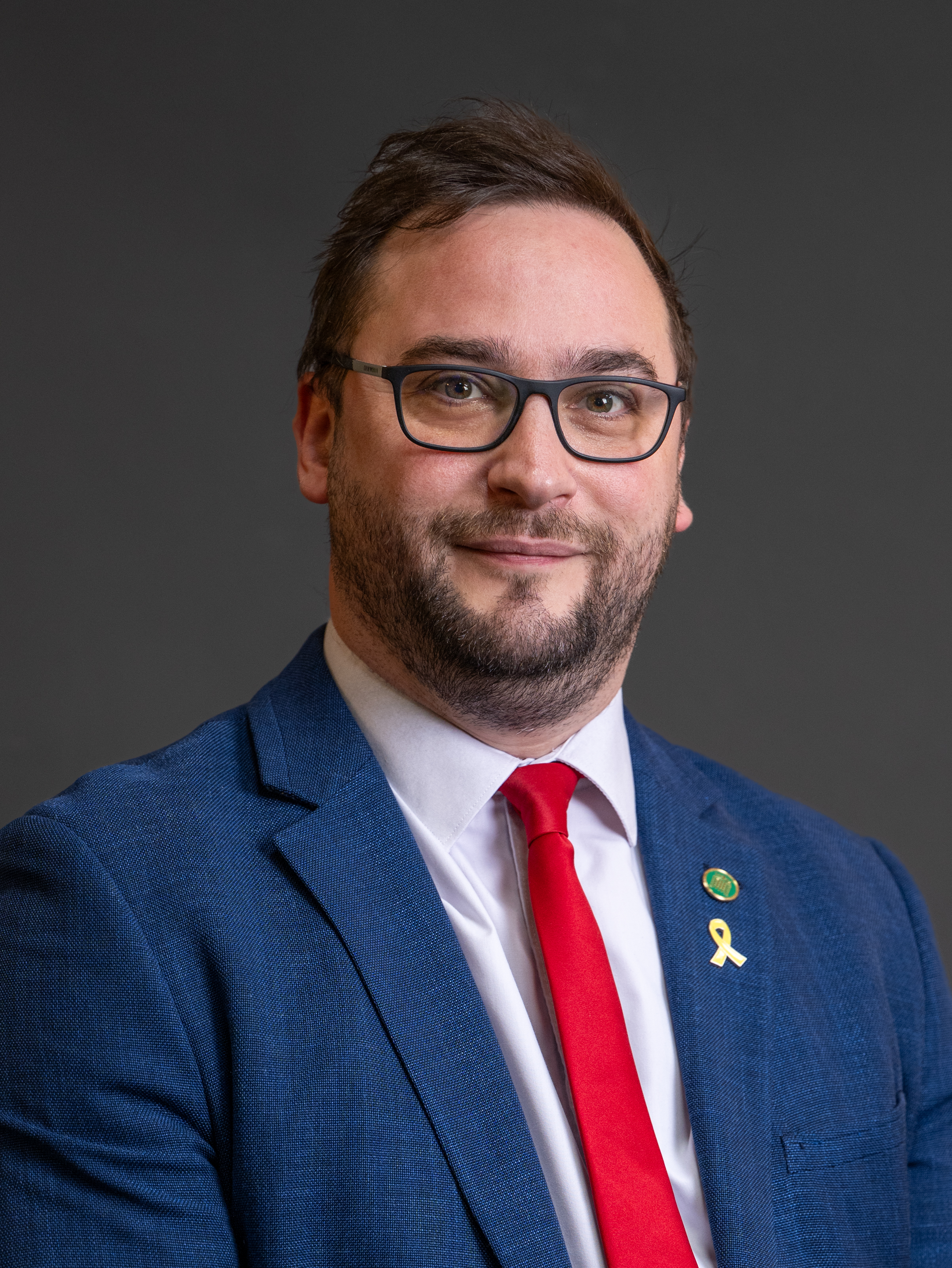
- Official portrait, 2025

Lord Commissioner of the Treasury
- Incumbent
- Assumed office 7 September 2025
- Prime Minister: Keir Starmer; Andy Burnham

Assistant Government Whip
- In office 10 July 2024 – 7 September 2025
- Prime Minister: Keir Starmer

Opposition Whip
- In office 1 November 2022 – 5 July 2024
- Leader: Keir Starmer

Member of Parliament for Bury South
- Incumbent
- Assumed office 12 December 2019
- Preceded by: Ivan Lewis
- Majority: 9,361 (22.2%)

Member of Pendle Borough Council for Barrowford
- In office 7 May 2015 – 24 April 2020
- Preceded by: Christopher Jowett
- Succeeded by: Linda Crossley

Member of Lancashire County Council for Pendle West
- In office 2 May 2013 – 6 May 2021
- Preceded by: Shelagh Derwent
- Succeeded by: Christopher Hartley (Pendle Hill)

Personal details
- Born: 9 November 1984 (age 41) Burnley, Lancashire, England
- Party: Labour (since 2022)
- Other political affiliations: Conservative (2013–2022)
- Spouse: Alexandra Wakeford
- Education: Lancaster University; Open University

Christian Wakeford (born 9 November 1984) is a British politician serving as a Lord Commissioner of the Treasury since 2025. He has been the Member of Parliament (MP) for Bury South since the 2019 general election. Elected in 2019 as a Conservative, he crossed the floor to Labour in 2022. He was re-elected for Labour in the 2024 general election.

== Early life and career ==
Wakeford has described himself as having Ukrainian heritage; his maternal grandfather was Ukrainian. After graduating with a third class degree in politics at Lancaster University, Wakeford was employed as an indirect account manager at a telecoms company for four years, from October 2009 to October 2013. Concurrently, Wakeford undertook an undergraduate degree in chemistry through the Open University from 2010 to 2014.

In an interview with Insurance Age in March 2020, which described him as an "[i]nsurance broker turned Conservative MP", Wakeford said "his time in the insurance industry" gave him "experience of the real world" and "the communication skills needed to speak to businesses".

== Political career ==
=== Local government ===
Before becoming an MP, Wakeford held several public office roles. From 2009 to 2017, he was a local education authority governor for Colne Park High School. In 2013, he was elected for the Pendle Hill division on Lancashire County Council. From 2015 to 2016, he was a House of Commons case worker for Conservative MP Andrew Stephenson. In 2018, he became co-chair of Lancashire County Council's Education Scrutiny Committee. In 2015, he became a borough councillor for Barrowford ward on Pendle Borough Council, and from 2019 to 2020 was leader of its Conservative Group.

After his election as an MP in December 2019, Wakeford continued claiming public allowances for at least three roles outside the House of Commons – as a Lancashire county councillor, as chair of that council's education scrutiny committee and as a Pendle borough councillor – despite having announced his resignation in February 2020. Wakeford received a total allowance equating to £22,041 on top of his salary of £81,932 as an MP.

In June 2020, Wakeford stated that he had not resigned his Lancashire County Council seat as a block on elections during the COVID-19 pandemic would leave residents without representation for a year. Wakeford attributed his change of mind over his resignation to a desire to ensure the two areas where he was a councillor were not without representation during the COVID-19 pandemic. Fellow councillor Mark Perks was critical of this justification, citing a comparable case in Chorley Council where the incumbent had stepped down and no by-election was held and other colleagues had stood in. Perks said: "[Wakeford] is not even an MP for part of Lancashire and it just grates with me that somebody can be elected to Parliament and get all their expenses, but then stay on at a local authority and claim expenses for that, too – it's not doing a service to the residents in his area, nor the council taxpayers of Lancashire."

Between the general election in December 2019 and July 2020, there were reportedly only two full meetings of Lancashire County Council, of which Wakeford had attended one. Over the same time, Lancashire County Council's Education Scrutiny Committee reportedly held three meetings, of which Wakeford – as committee chair – had attended one. Wakeford's office had stated in June 2020 that he would relinquish his chairmanship of the Education Scrutiny Committee, which attracted an allowance of £7,620 per annum.

In July 2020, Private Eye reported that after the general election, Wakeford had applied to Pendle Borough Council for leave of absence "while he sorted himself out in Westminster". His request was declined and in April 2020 Wakeford automatically lost his seat, as he had not attended a borough council meeting for six months. Wakeford had been receiving an annual allowance as a councillor of Lancashire County Council and Pendle Borough Council until 6 May 2021 and 24 April 2020 respectively.

=== In Parliament ===
In December 2019, Wakeford was elected as the Conservative MP for Bury South, winning the seat by 402 votes (a 0.8% majority) from long-term Labour MP, Ivan Lewis, who had held the seat since Labour's landslide victory in 1997. Lewis had resigned from the Labour Party in December 2018 and stood as an independent candidate at the 2019 election, but polled in fifth place with 1,366 votes. On 14 March 2020, Wakeford was appointed as a member of the House of Commons Education Committee. The committee has since been involved in inquiries such as the impact of COVID-19 on education and children's services, adult skills and lifelong learning, and "left behind" white pupils from disadvantaged backgrounds.

In July 2020, Wakeford was elected as co-chair of the All-Party Parliamentary Group (APPG) on British Jews, whose stated purpose is to promote understanding of the aspirations and challenges of the UK's Jewish community, with topics including religious freedom, faith-based education, welfare and social justice, in addition to celebrating the culture, contribution and achievements of the UK's Jewish community. Residential areas within Bury South, particularly Prestwich and Whitefield, are home to some of Britain's largest Jewish communities outside London.

On 20 July 2021 in the second reading of the Nationality and Borders Bill Wakeford said asylum seekers travelling through several safe countries before reaching the UK "are very often travelling through many safe countries. Essentially they have a shopping trolley as to what they want in this economic migration". Wakeford is one of 22 UK MPs who are members of the International Parliamentary Network for Education (IPNEd), an initiative of Results UK, a dual-registered company and charity. It states its priorities are to achieve higher total and better quality financing for education, ensure policy makers prioritise helping the furthest behind first and secure a focus on the quality of education and improved learning.

It was reported in The Times on 5 November 2021 that Wakeford approached Owen Paterson and called him "a cunt" during the Owen Paterson affair, after the government, under the instruction of Prime Minister Boris Johnson, whipped its MPs to vote to change rules on the way MPs' conduct is policed in order to avoid Paterson being suspended from parliament.

==== Move to Labour ====
On 19 January 2022, Wakeford publicly confirmed that he had submitted a letter of no confidence in Johnson following the Partygate scandal. Later that day, it was announced that Wakeford had joined the Labour Party. He was the first sitting Conservative MP to defect to Labour since Quentin Davies in 2007. His defection surprised many Conservatives; however, Wakeford had approached the Labour Party about a possible defection several months before. He cited the Dominic Cummings scandal, removal of the £20 Universal Credit uplift, the cost of living crisis, the Owen Paterson affair, and "partygate" as factors in his decision. It was also reported that Labour MP Barry Gardiner had encouraged Wakeford to move to Labour, following their work together in support of Gardiner's anti "fire and rehire" bill. Wakeford was the only Conservative MP to support the bill. It has been suggested that concerns about re-election as an MP may have been his underlying motivation, with Labour leading in the polls at the time.

On the day of his defection, Wakeford wrote to Johnson, "You and the Conservative Party as a whole have shown themselves incapable of offering the leadership and government this country deserves." The changes Wakeford maintains are needed by his constituents "can only be delivered by a Labour government with Keir Starmer". Wakeford wrote to Johnson that Labour was "ready to provide an alternative government that this country can be proud of, and not embarrassed by". Wakeford also wrote, "the policies of the Conservative government that you [Johnson] lead are doing nothing to help the people of my constituency and indeed are only making the struggles they face on a daily basis worse." He wrote that the UK needed "a government that upholds the highest standards of integrity and probity in public life." He wrote that he had "no doubt" his constituents would best benefit from his "joining a party that genuinely has their interests at heart", and confessed he had "wrestled with my conscience for many months". Wakeford wrote that Starmer had "shown that integrity in the way he has led his party".

Starmer welcomed Wakeford to Labour at Prime Minister's Questions on the day of his defection. Some Labour members were critical of the acceptance of Wakeford. In January 2021, Wakeford allegedly sent WhatsApp messages in which he referred to Labour as a "bunch of cunts". The left-wing campaign group Momentum stated that Wakeford "should be nowhere near the Labour Party", and that a by-election should be immediately called in the constituency. Conservative MP and former Northern Powerhouse Minister Jake Berry told the BBC's Politics Live, "I think it was a terrible mistake by Christian. I think he's misjudged the mood of his constituents." The views of his constituents were reportedly mixed, with some calling for a by-election, noting that Wakeford himself lent his support to the unsuccessful Recall of MPs (Change of Party Affiliation) Bill in 2020, which would have made it mandatory for MPs who change party allegiance to face a recall petition in their constituency. Labour Shadow Chancellor Rachel Reeves responded to these calls in an interview on Good Morning Britain, arguing that having a by-election now in Bury South is "just not the way our democracy works", and called instead for a general election.

==== Alleged blackmail by Conservatives ====
Shortly after his defection, allegations were made of blackmail and bullying by Conservative Party whips. Wakeford said in an interview that he had experienced this behaviour when he was previously threatened with the loss of funding for a local school if he did not vote with Government on a motion regarding free school meals. He said: "I was threatened that I would not get a school for Radcliffe if I did not vote in one particular way. This is a town that has not had a high school for the best part of 10 years. How would you feel when they hold back the regeneration of a town for a vote. It didn't sit comfortably. That was the start of me questioning my place, where I was and ultimately to where I am now." Later that week, Wakeford accused Gavin Williamson, the then education secretary, of being the person behind this.

==== After defection ====
On 26 May 2022, Wakeford was appointed Parliamentary Private Secretary to Bridget Phillipson, the shadow secretary of state for education. He was appointed an Opposition Whip on 1 November 2022. On 8 November 2022, Wakeford was confirmed as the Labour candidate for Bury South at the 2024 general election. Wakeford is a vice-chair of Labour Friends of Israel and was part of a delegation to the country in February 2023. In May 2023, Wakeford called for Roger Waters to be banned from performing in Manchester following controversy over the alleged use of anti-Semitic imagery at his shows.

During 2022 and 2024, Wakeford employed former Labour aide Mathew Torbitt on his staff. In July 2026, Torbitt pleaded guilty to two counts of fraud, that related to more than £6,000 in parliamentary travel and accommodation expenses, "funded by the taxpayer" between 22 August 2022, and 29 September 2024, at Thames Magistrates' Court. Torbitt will be sentenced at Snaresbrook Crown Court, in late 2026. The CPS prosecution followed an investigation by the Metropolitan Police that commenced in April 2025, resulting in Torbitt being charged in June 2026 with two counts of fraud, by false misrepresentation.

== Personal life ==
Wakeford is married to Alexandra Wakeford. He had an older brother, Mark Jones, who died at the age of 44 in a car accident in 2015.

Parliament of the United Kingdom
Preceded by Ivan Lewis	Member of Parliament for Bury South; 2019–present	Incumbent
