= World-Check =

Background check database

World-Check is a database of politically exposed persons (PEPs) and 'heightened risk' individuals and organizations. World Check formed part of the Thomson Reuters Risk Management Solutions suite before being transferred to Refinitiv after a merger deal with The Blackstone Group in October 2018.

== History ==
World-Check was founded in 2000 by David Leppan and registered in London. Its database was powered by Uptime ITechnology, founded by Nikolaus Kimla. In 2008, World-Check launched Country-Check, an index which ranks over 240 countries and territories worldwide in terms of risk.

In 2009, World-Check acquired IntegraScreen. In 2011, World-Check received independent assurance under the International Standard on Assurance Engagements ISAE 3000. Also in 2011, Thomson Reuters acquired World-Check for their governance, risk management, and compliance unit. In October 2018, Thomson Reuters closed a deal with The Blackstone Group and, as a result of this merger, World-Check is owned by Refinitiv, which, at the end of August 2023 changed its name to LSEG.

== Partnerships ==
World-Check is used by several financial firms, such as Lloyd's of London since 2008, Maecenas, and SAI Global as a risk management partner.

== Controversies ==
=== False claims ===
In 2017, World-Check admitted that the Palestine Solidarity Campaign should never have been placed on their database at all, and specifically, should not have been associated with terrorism. World-Check agreed to pay compensation and apologize to Finsbury Park Mosque.

In 2017, Quilliam founder Maajid Nawaz was found to have been listed as a terrorist in World-Check following an investigation by Vice. Thomson Reuters subsequently removed his name from the list, apologized, and paid an undisclosed amount in damages as part of the settlement following the threat of a lawsuit by Nawaz.

== See also ==
- Suisse secrets
- World Leaders
