= Boyes (retailer) =

Chain of department stores in the United Kingdom

W Boyes & Co., Limited
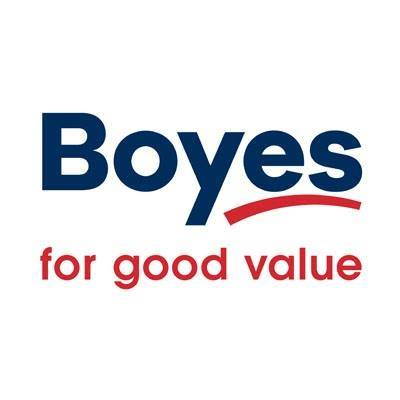

- Boyes, Queen Street, Scarborough
- Trade name: Boyes
- Type: Private
- Industry: Retail
- Founded: 1881; 145 years ago Scarborough, North Yorkshire, England
- Founder: William Boyes
- Headquarters: Eastfield, North Yorkshire, England
- Number of locations: 88 (October 2026)
- Key people: Andrew Boyes (chairman, Joint Managing Director); Richard Boyes (Joint Managing Director)
- Products: Variety
- Revenue: ▲£105,447,222 (2025); ▲£101,775,615 (2024); ▲£93,810,644 (2023)
- Website: https://boyes.co.uk

W.Boyes & Co.,Limited, trading as Boyes, is a British variety retailer, founded by William Boyes in 1881 in Scarborough, North Yorkshire. It has been run by generations of the Boyes family ever since.

The company's slogan is "for good value" and the stores specialise in the discount retail sector, stocking a mixture of regular lines, one-off special purchases and clearance items. Boyes stores stock over 30,000 products over a large range including household products, fashion and footwear. The stores serve around 250,000 customers a week.

Its full trading name is W Boyes and Co. Ltd, however the stores trade as "Boyes", but is commonly referred to as "Boyes's" (as in a shop run by the Boyes family). It is still owned and family run with Andrew Boyes and his son Richard as joint managing directors. Richard represents the fifth generation of the family.

The company is based at its head office at Havers Hill in Eastfield. It expanded this site with the purchase of the former Polestar Greaves factory in 2011. It also has a warehouse site at nearby Hopper Hill. In 2024 the company purchased a further site in Eastfield at the former Pindar site at Thornburgh Road.

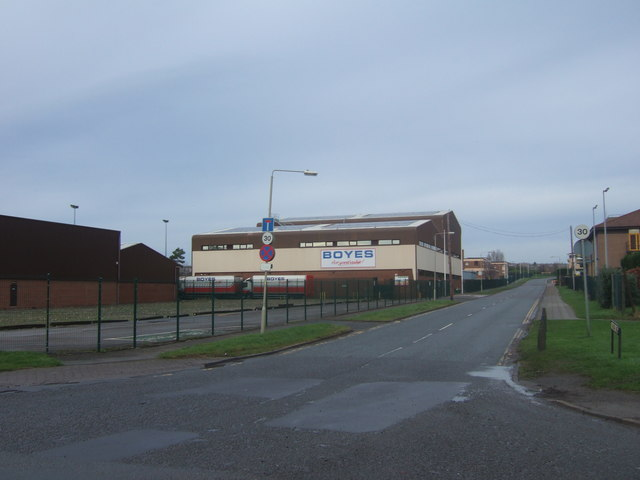
Boyes warehouse, Eastfield

== Business operations ==
The stores are organised in different departments and have a large range of different products including toys, stationery, toiletries, housewares, electrical appliances, DIY items, fishing tackle, model making, soft furnishings, confectionery and pet products. They stock a large range of clothing and footwear with ranges for men, ladies, babies and children. The stores also have a comprehensive range of dress fabrics, knitting yarn, haberdashery, crafts and cardmaking products.

The company has achieved ‘zero waste to landfill’ by ensuring that all cardboard and polythene generated by the stores are recycled, which generates revenue and reduces Boyes’ carbon footprint.

It has a presence on social media, with accounts on Facebook, Twitter and Instagram. The company supports a number of local causes and is a sponsor of Scarborough Cricket Club. In February 2012 company directors Andrew Boyes and Timothy Boyes were given Freedom of the Borough of Scarborough.

The Scarborough store is part of a long-standing tradition in the town each year. Father Christmas arrives on a boat in the harbour and after a parade through the town, is resident in a grotto in the store until Christmas Eve. The grotto and window displays have a different theme each year.

== History ==
=== Scarborough ===
Founder William Boyes was born in 1859 and started his career as an apprentice draper with a firm called George and Collings. At the end of his apprenticeship, saving £10 from his wages he opened his first store at the corner of Eastborough and Globe Street in Scarborough, selling remnants from merchants. The area was full of poverty, and the store was therefore popular with housewives.

Trade increased and William needed bigger premises to operate. Two corner units on Market Street and Queen Street were purchased in 1886. Further buildings were acquired and within ten years almost all of one side of Market Street was owned by Boyes. The store was named "The Remnant Warehouse" and is still known as the Rem by older residents of Scarborough. In 1900 Boyes became a limited company when William and three friends, James Pirie, Henry Merrie Cross and JH Harrison invested in the business.

Over the years William added more products to the range and the store went from a warehouse to a department store. The company began to expand to York, Hull and Grimsby in the following years. Stores in Newcastle upon Tyne and North Shields were also opened, but closed in the Great Depression.

On 26 February 1915, the store was destroyed by a huge fire, which is believed to be the biggest in Scarborough's history. It caused around £70,000 of damage. The store was insured and it was rebuilt.

The Scarborough store was home to a number of animals in the past, including monkeys, chipmunks and budgies. The animals were used as way of encouraging customers to visit the store and purchase something whilst they visited. Two of the monkeys, Jacko and Dinah, are famous to a generation of Scarborough shoppers.

The Scarborough store served as Boyes head office until the site at Eastfield opened in 1971.

Boyes ran a twice yearly sale for many years across their stores. Particularly in Scarborough, the store was famous for long queues of customers waiting for the doors to open on the first day.

=== Hull ===
Boyes history in Kingston upon Hull dates back to the nineteenth century. In 1898 they began trading with a shop in Prospect Street, but it was closed in 1901 when the lease was sold to Taylor's Drug Store, a business owned by another Boyes director, William Taylor Mason.

Hessle Road

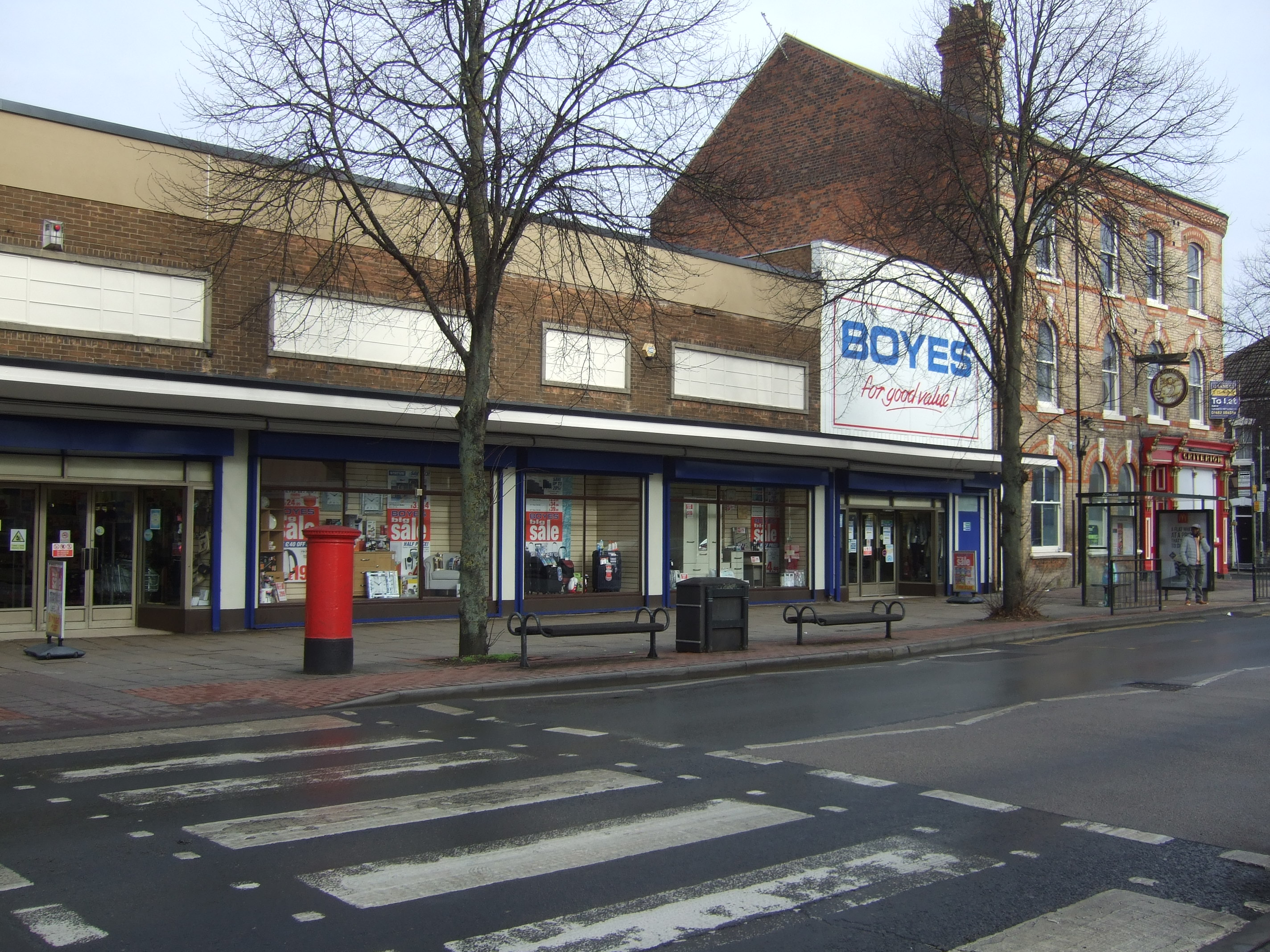
Boyes, Hessle Road, Hull

In 1920 they returned to Hull, this time on Hessle Road. The company leased a building owned by Johnny Wardell, later buying the lease. In 1927 Boyes bought a neighbouring property to extend the store and further extended the store in the 1950s.

Holderness Road

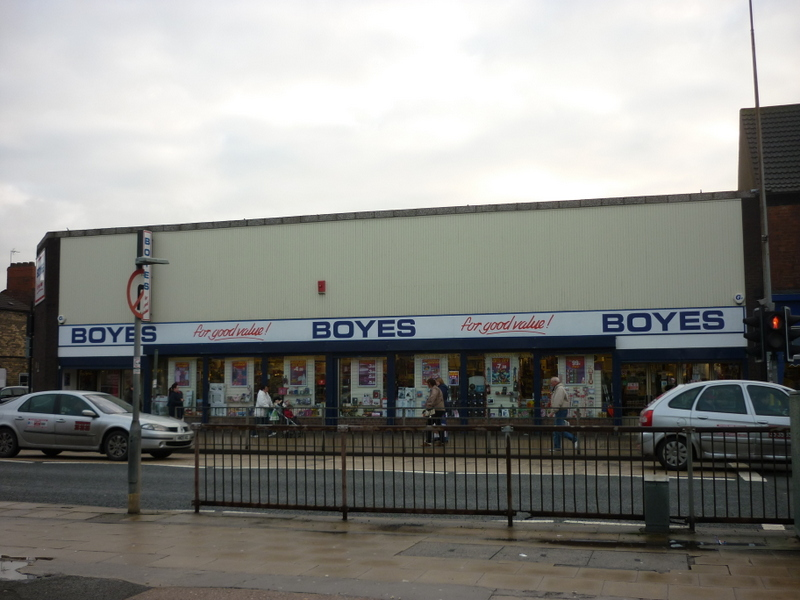
Boyes, Holderness Road, Hull

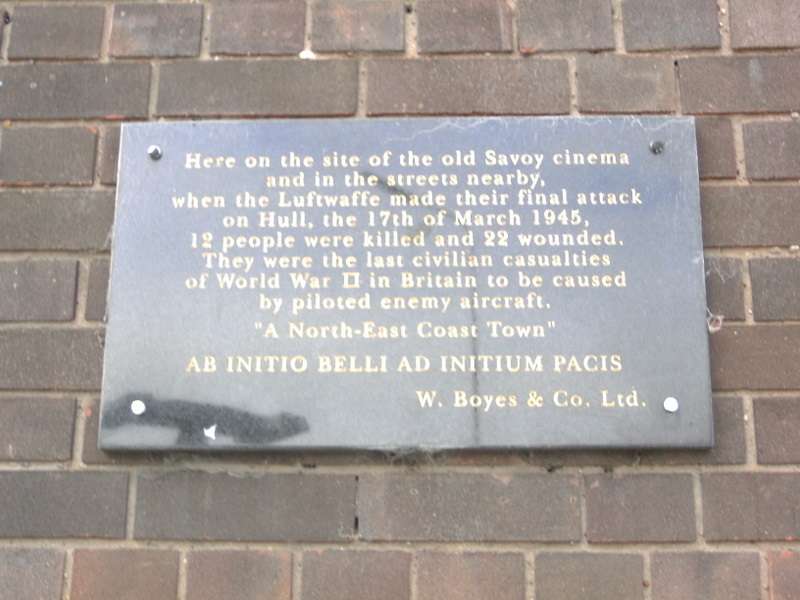
Plaque outside Boyes, Holderness Road, Hull

The next store in Hull opened on Holderness Road in 1965. The store was built on the site of the former Savoy cinema. The cinema was bombed in the last Luftwaffe attack of World War II to cause civilian casualties in the UK. Thirteen people were killed and 22 injured and they are commemorated on a plaque on the outside of the store.

Bransholme

A store in the Bransholme (now North Point) centre followed in 1973. Boyes were the first company to sign up to open a store in the centre. The Bransholme store was under threat of closure in 2014 when terms on a new lease could not be agreed and the company began looking for new premises in Hull. After negotiations, a new lease was agreed, but Boyes still pushed on with plans for a new store.

Whitefriargate

The company's fourth store in Hull, on Whitefriargate opened on 19 September 2014. The unit was previously occupied by Peacocks, and before this it was one of the first Woolworths stores in the UK.

Prospect Centre

On 8 May 2026 a branch of Boyes opened in the Prospect Centre on Brook Street. It occupies the space left vacant since the collapse of Wilko in October 2023.

=== York ===
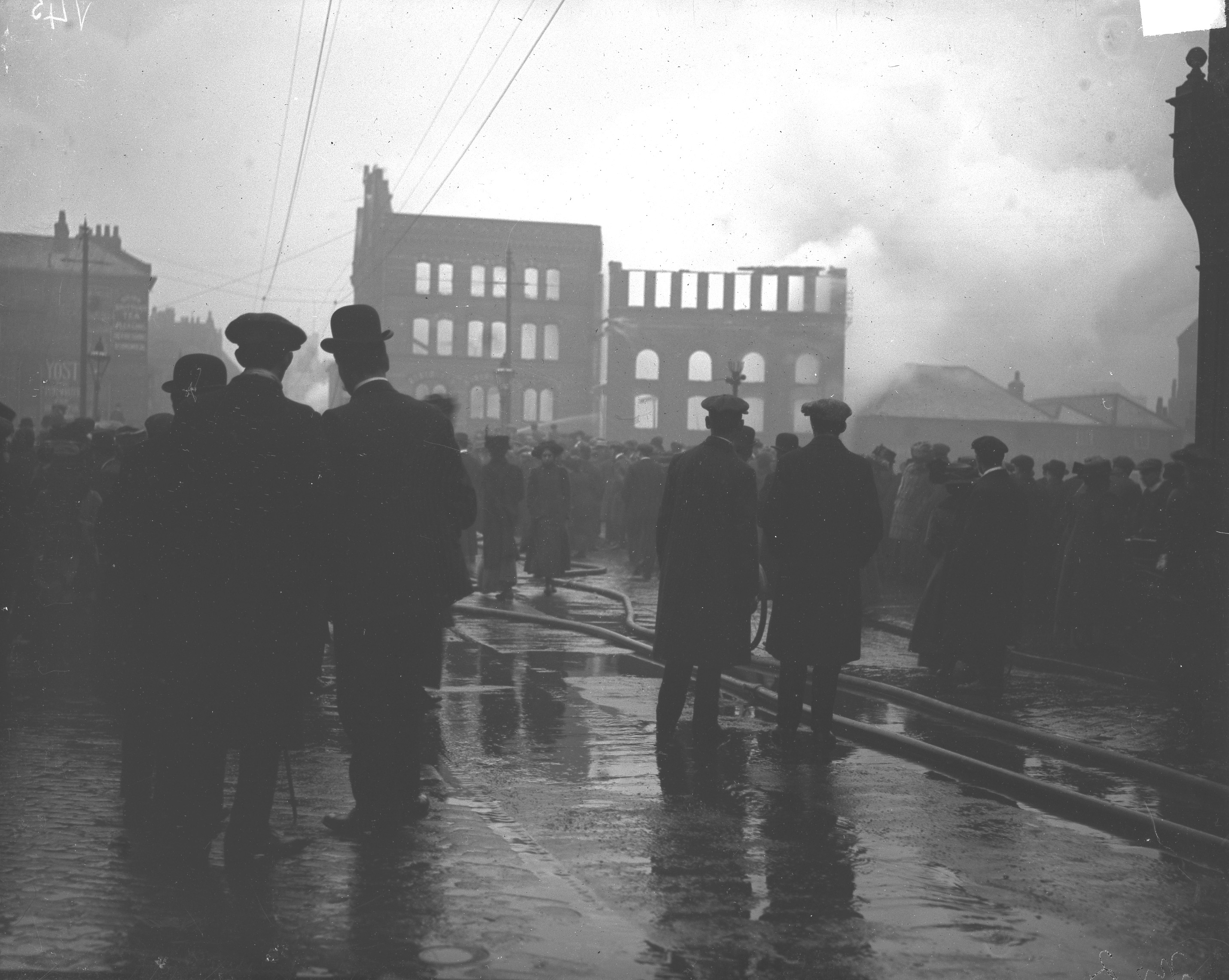
Fire at Boyes, Ouse Bridge, York

Fire engine on Bridge Street, York

Boyes opened in York in 1906, on Bridge Street near the River Ouse in a former paint warehouse. The store was destroyed by fire on 8 December 1910. The fire was thought to have begun in the toy department when gas lamps came into contact with Christmas decorations. The fire took six hours to put out, but all staff and customers were safely evacuated. Boyes moved temporarily to Clifford Street whilst their premises were being rebuilt. The fire is estimated to have caused £20,000 of damage.

There was a delay to the rebuilding of the store in a tragic accident in February 1912. A workman was killed and seven others injured when a clock tower being built collapsed. The store reopened without a clock tower in December 1912.

The store was renowned in York for elaborate Christmas displays and a Santa's Grotto each year. The building was extended in 1966, and plans were made for it to be modernised in 1978. However, these plans were not viable and the store closed on 26 February 1983. Boyes returned to York on 15 May 1987 with a smaller store on Goodramgate.

The company opened another store within the York city area in Acomb, in April 2015. Three retail units in Front Street, which were previously Superdrug, Bonmarché and Jonathan James, were purchased and combined to form one new store.

=== Grimsby ===
The firm established a presence in Grimsby in 1926 when the Hewlands store on Freeman Street was purchased by Boyes after the owner, Ernest Hewland got into financial difficulties. The store continued to trade under the Hewlands name until August 1956 when Mr Hewland retired. The building was replaced with a new property on the same site and went by the Boyes name.

The store traded well and 1958 Boyes purchased five old properties further down Freeman Street and built a second store in their place. This store opened in May 1961. Boyes traded from both sites until the newer site was extended and reopened in October 1974 and the original Hewlands site was sold. A store in neighbouring Cleethorpes was opened in June 2010 in a former Woolworths branch.

=== Further expansion ===
Boyes opened stores in Billingham in 1967, Darlington in 1970 and Louth in 1976. The tenth store in Northallerton opened in 1977.

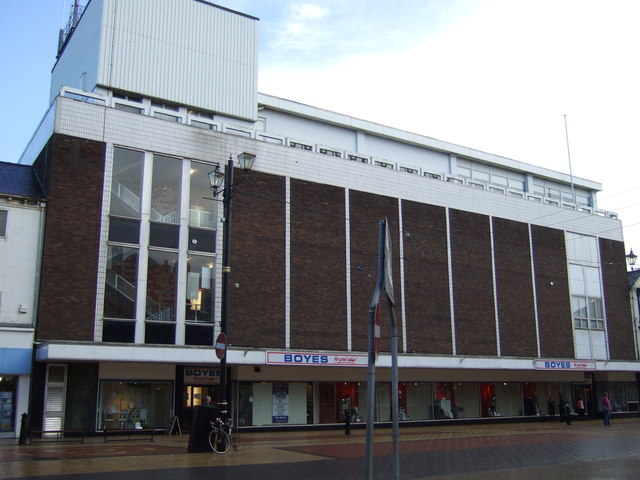
Boyes, King Street, Bridlington

The company then developed a chain of stores throughout Northern England in the following decades.

In March 1998 Boyes opened a store in a large four-storey building in Bridlington. This building had previously been the home of Carltons department store until 1969, until Hammonds of Hull purchased the store and demolished and rebuilt the store, opening as Hammonds in 1970. Hammonds were purchased by House of Fraser in 1972 and the store traded under the Binns name until it was closed in 1995.

The Bridlington store's top floor also has a museum of the firm's history. It consists of a reconstruction of a store front from the early twentieth century, a recreation of a till point from the era and automation of a life sized draper, complete with desk and bolts of fabric. There are also numerous artefacts in the way of photographs, objects and advertisements.

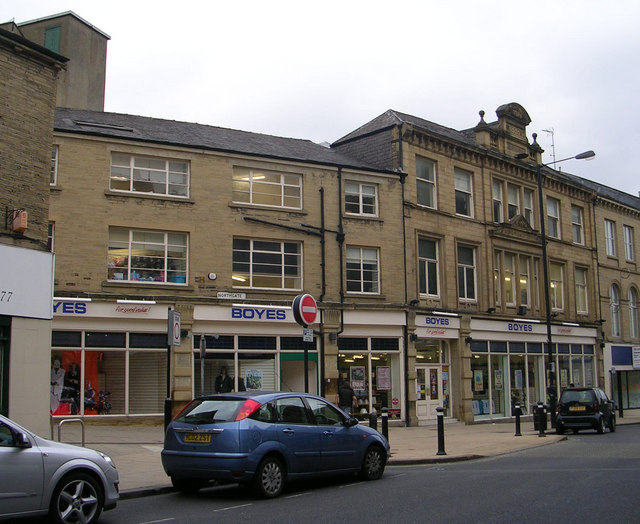
Boyes, North Parade, Bradford (closed 2019)

The company's first store in West Yorkshire, in Bradford, opened in 2003. Boyes took over the former Christopher Pratts store in North Parade after Pratts relocated to Leeds. At the time the company invested more than £500,000 to refurbish the store before opening and the store was one of the biggest in the chain. The company opened a small section of the store earlier in 2003 before a full opening in September. In May 2019 the store relocated from North Parade to the Kirkgate Centre. The North Parade site had become unviable with the company citing factors including the closure of the city centre Morrisons store and the planned relocation of the market in the area. Boyes took over the former Argos unit in the centre. The upcoming demolition of the Kirkgate Centre forced Boyes to close permanently in Bradford in June 2026.

Boyes has expanded its reach further by opening several stores in the East Midlands and as far south as Cambridgeshire. The company reached its landmark 50th store with the opening of the Coalville store in July 2014.

The company has increased store numbers in many cases by moving into units vacated by other retailers. They have taken over ex-Woolworths stores in Cleethorpes, Bishop Auckland and Coalville. Former Co-op department stores in Arnold, Brighouse, Eastwood, Ilkley, March and Ripley have been taken over, and a couple of vacated Marks and Spencer stores in Grantham and South Shields.

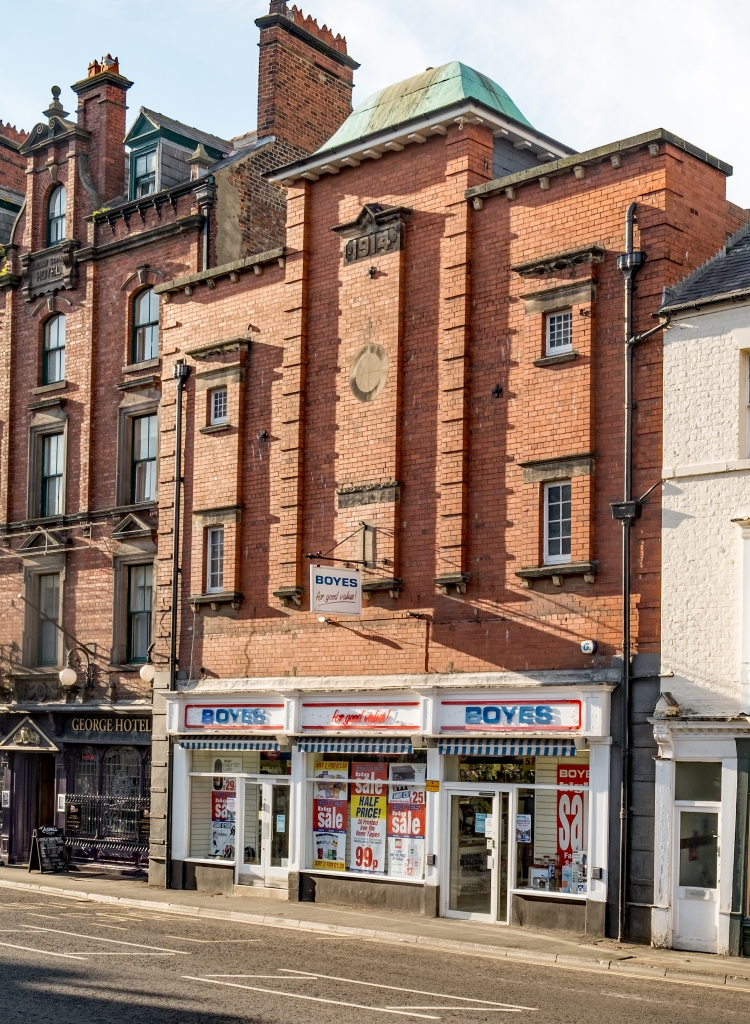
Boyes, Station Square, Whitby

There are examples of the company converting various non-retail premises into stores. In June 1984, a store was opened in what was previously the Empire Cinema in Whitby. In the same year, the former Bower's restaurant in Malton was converted to a Boyes store. A store in Brigg opened in what was the Brown & Co auction rooms in October 2012. In July 2014, a building in Chesterfield was converted to retail use by Boyes. It was built as the Regal Cinema in 1936 before becoming a nightclub called Zanzibar in the 1990s.

In recent years the company has relocated some of its branches to new locations in the same town. As well as the Bradford relocation, in 2017 the Gainsborough store was relocated due to the original one being demolished for the building of a new Lidl supermarket. Boyes now trade from a newly built unit on the site of the former Crown House. In 2018 the Middlesbrough store moved from the Dundas Centre to the Hill Street Centre, moving into a former Argos outlet. The Doncaster store moved from its original Duke Street location to the Frenchgate shopping centre in 2024. The Doncaster store was the first store to be located in a former Wilko store in 2024, with further stores following in Blyth, Beeston, Market Drayton, King's Lynn, Kettering, Dunstable, Nottingham, Market Harborough, Burton upon Trent and further relocations in Newark and Driffield.

In September 2019 with the opening of a store in Barton-upon-Humber, a new company logo was used for the first time.

Boyes opened a concession in a newly refurbished Co-op store in Mablethorpe in December 2021 as part of a new partnership between the two companies. Boyes operates a 3,600 square foot concession within the supermarket. Further Co-op concessions were opened in 2023 in Thornton-Cleveleys, Blackpool and Swindon.

In 2024 the company branched out beyond its traditional trading areas with the first store in Scotland opening in June (part of the Co-op store) in Inverness, however this store didn't trade for long and closed in August 2026.

The company established itself in South Wales with the opening in December 2024 of a store in Llanelli, followed by a former Wilko store in Swansea one year later.

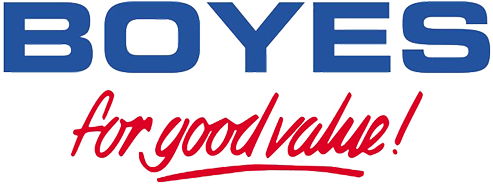
Previous company logo until 2020

== Gallery ==
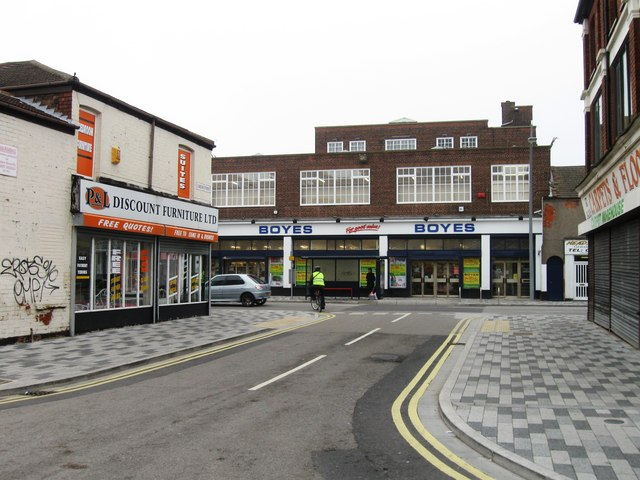
Freeman Street, Grimsby

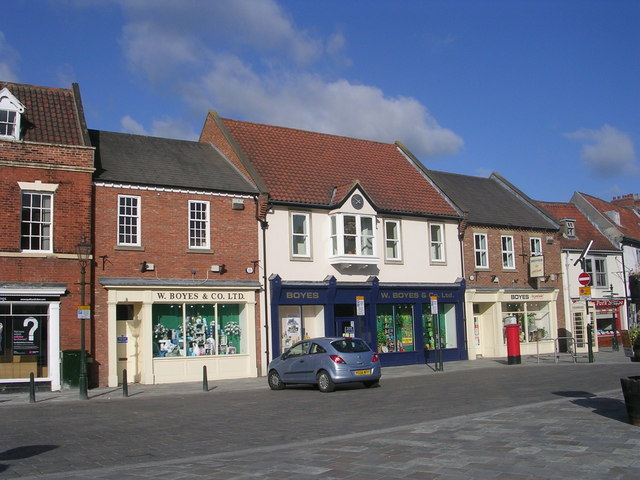
Boyes, Wednesday Market, Beverley

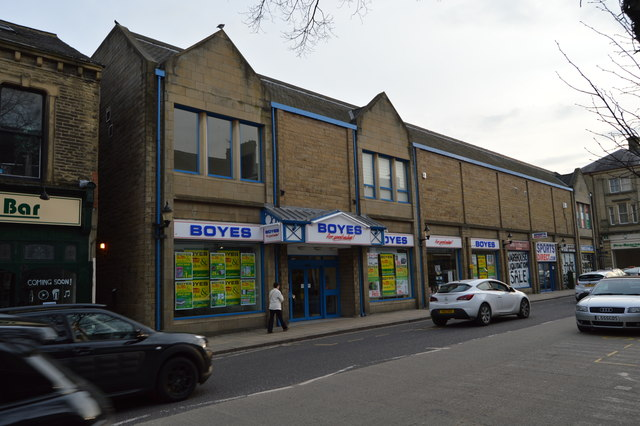
Boyes, Swadford Street, Skipton

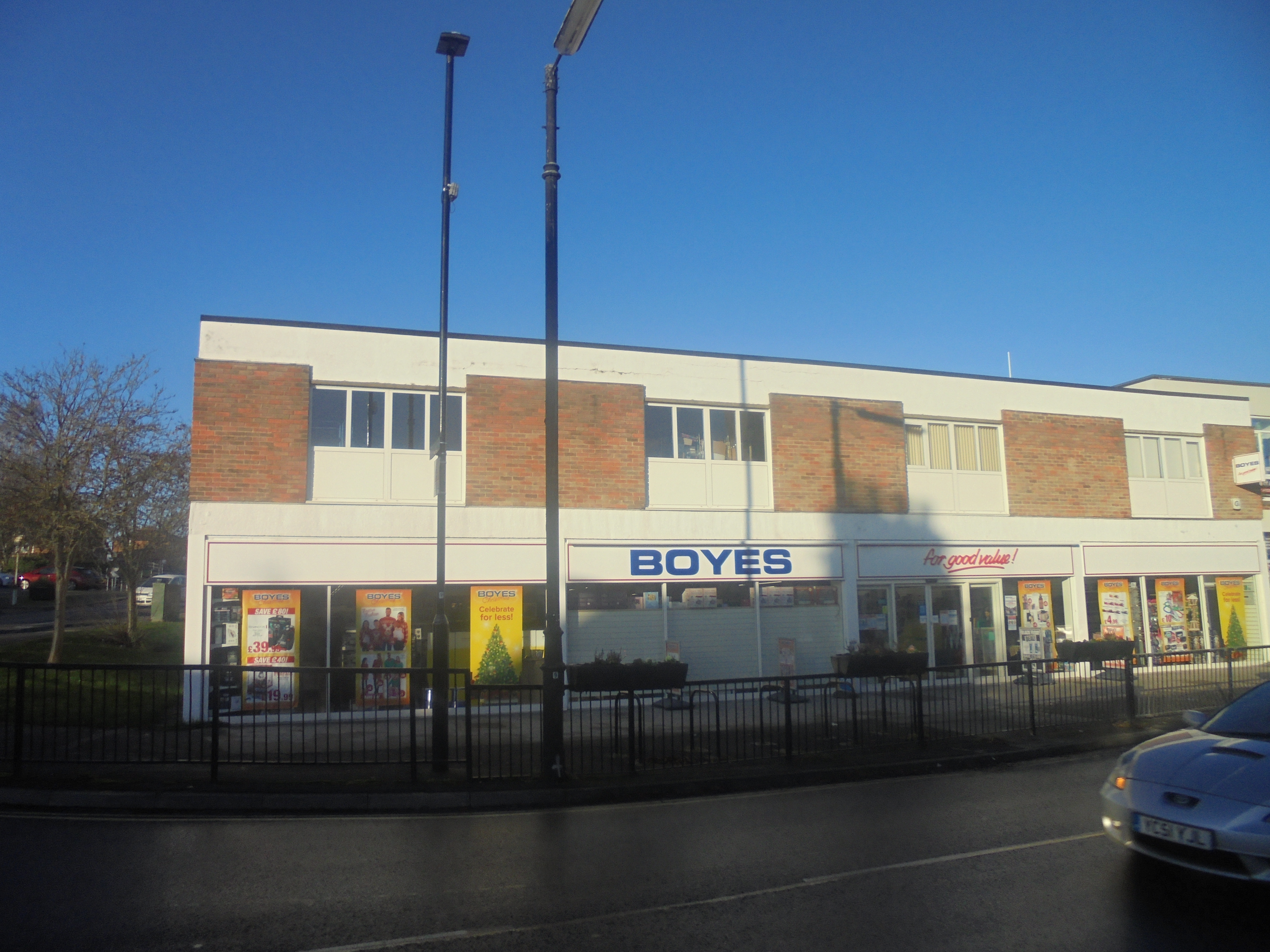
Boyes, Front Street, Acomb, York

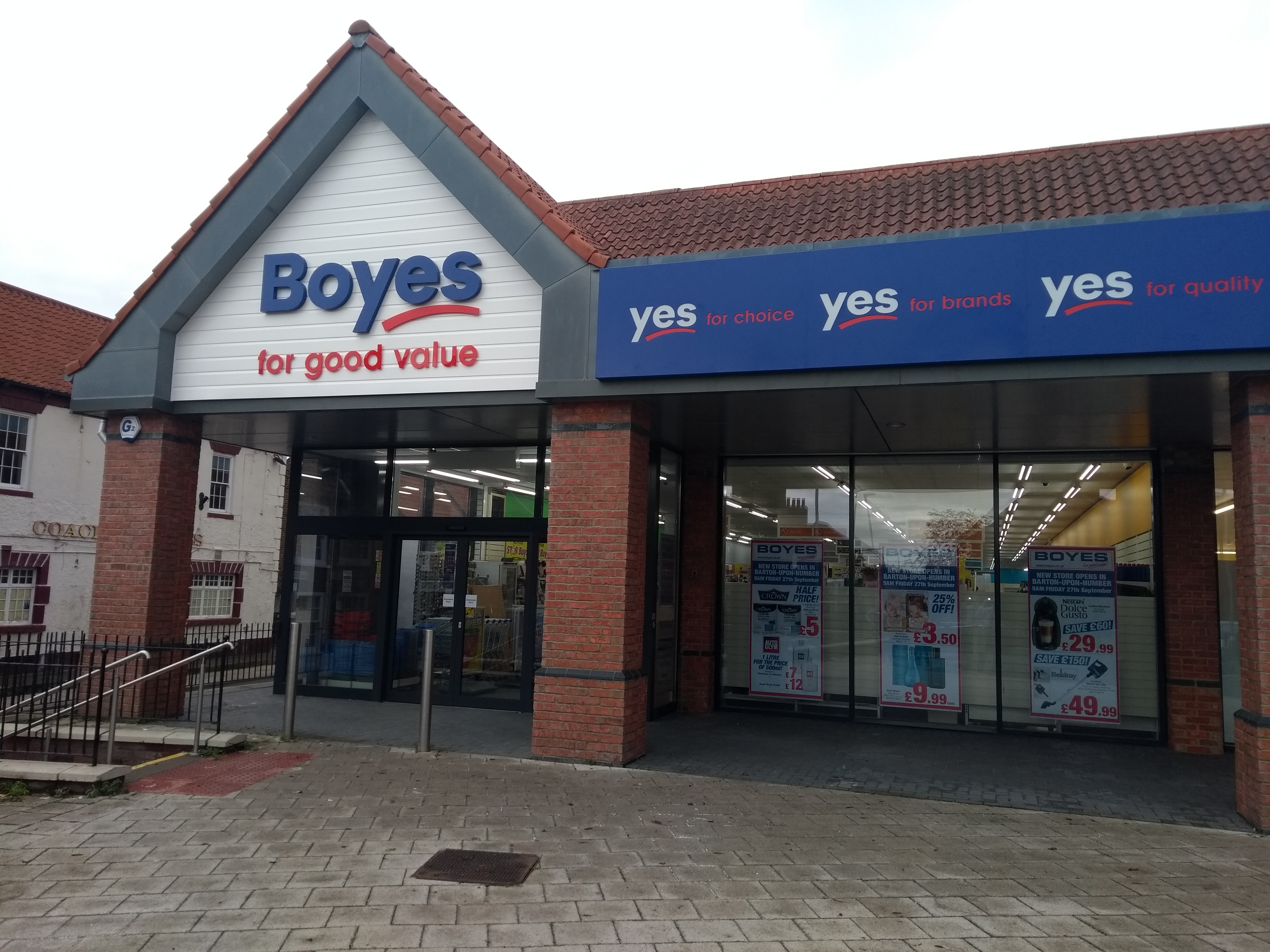
Boyes, High Street, Barton-upon-Humber, September 2019

== Store locations ==
Location	County	Opened	Notes
Acomb	North Yorkshire	2015	
Arnison Centre, Durham	County Durham	2022	
Arnold	Nottinghamshire	2009	
Barnard Castle	County Durham	1983	
Barton-upon-Humber	Lincolnshire	2019	
Beeston	Nottinghamshire	2024	
Beverley	East Riding of Yorkshire	1993	
Billingham	County Durham	1967	
Bingham	Nottinghamshire	2013	
Bishop Auckland	County Durham	2010	
Blackpool	Lancashire	2023	within Co-op store
Blaydon	Tyne and Wear	2016	
Blyth	Northumberland	2024	
Bradford	West Yorkshire	2003	2003 North Parade, relocated 2019 Kirkgate Centre, closed 2026
Bridlington	East Riding of Yorkshire	1998	
Brigg	Lincolnshire	2012	
Brighouse	West Yorkshire	2010	
Burton upon Trent	Staffordshire	2026	
Chester-le-Street	County Durham	1991	
Chesterfield	Derbyshire	2014	
Cleethorpes	Lincolnshire	2010	
Coalville	Leicestershire	2014	
Consett	County Durham	2006	
Coulby Newham	North Yorkshire	2017	
Cramlington	Northumberland	2022	
Darlington	County Durham	1970	
Doncaster	South Yorkshire	2011	2011 Duke Street, relocated 2024 Frenchgate Centre
Driffield	East Riding of Yorkshire	1993	Relocated 2025
Dunstable	Bedfordshire	2025	
Eastwood	Nottinghamshire	2014	
Firth Park, Sheffield	South Yorkshire	2016	
Gainsborough	Lincolnshire	2006	Relocated 2017
Goole	East Riding of Yorkshire	1997	
Grantham	Lincolnshire	2012	
Grimsby	Lincolnshire	1956	Relocated May 1961
Guisborough	North Yorkshire	1981	
Hartlepool	County Durham	2025	
Heanor	Derbyshire	2014	
Holbeach	Lincolnshire	2005	
Hornsea	East Riding of Yorkshire	2020	
Hoyland	South Yorkshire	2017	
Hull, Bransholme, North Point Centre	East Riding of Yorkshire	1973	
Hull, Hessle Road	East Riding of Yorkshire	1920	
Hull, Holderness Road	East Riding of Yorkshire	1965	
Hull, Prospect Centre	East Riding of Yorkshire	2026	
Hull, Whitefriargate	East Riding of Yorkshire	2014	
Inverness	Inverness-shire	2024	within Co-op store, closed 2026
Ilkley	West Yorkshire	2010	
Kendal	Cumbria	2006	
Kettering	Northamptonshire	2025	
King's Lynn	Norfolk	2025	
Kirkby-in-Ashfield	Nottinghamshire	2006	
Lincoln	Lincolnshire	2003	2003 Sincil Street, relocated 2021 St Marks Shopping Centre
Llanelli	Carmarthenshire	2024	
Longton	Staffordshire	2026	
Louth	Lincolnshire	1976	
Mablethorpe	Lincolnshire	2021	within Co-op store
Malton	North Yorkshire	1984	
March	Cambridgeshire	2011	
Market Drayton	Shropshire	2025	
Market Harborough	Leicestershire	2026	
Market Warsop	Nottinghamshire	2015	
Matlock	Derbyshire	2018	
Melton Mowbray	Leicestershire	2008	
Middlesbrough	North Yorkshire	2008	2008 Dundas Centre, relocated 2018 Hill Street
Middleton	Greater Manchester	2026	
Newark	Nottinghamshire	2004	2004 Appletongate, relocated 2025 St Mark's Place
Newton Aycliffe	County Durham	1993	
Nottingham	Nottinghamshire	2026	
Northallerton	North Yorkshire	1977	
Ollerton	Nottinghamshire	2013	
Padiham	Lancashire	2016	
Redcar	North Yorkshire	1981	
Retford	Nottinghamshire	2018	
Ripley	Derbyshire	2013	
Royton	Greater Manchester	2016	
Scarborough	North Yorkshire	1881	relocated 1886
Skipton	North Yorkshire	2013	opened 2013, expanded 2023
Sleaford	Lincolnshire	2003	
South Shields	Tyne and Wear	2018	
Stockton-on-Tees	County Durham	1993	
Stokesley	North Yorkshire	1983	
Sutton-in-Ashfield	Nottinghamshire	2023	
Swansea	Swansea	2025	
Swindon	Wiltshire	2023	within Co-op store, closed 2026
Thornaby	North Yorkshire	2016	
Upton Retail Park, Wirral	Merseyside	2025	
Whitby	North Yorkshire	1984	
Worksop	Nottinghamshire	2018	
Yarm	North Yorkshire	1986	
York	North Yorkshire	1906	1906–1983 Ouse Bridge, reopened 1987 Goodramgate
