= Binns =

Binns may refer to:

- Binns (surname), English surname
- Binns (department store), British retailer
- Binns Hall, Virginia, United States
- House of the Binns, historic estate near Linlithgow, Scotland
