= Binns (surname) =

Binns is an English surname.

Notable people with this surname include:

- Alfred Binns (1929–2017), West Indian cricketer
- Archie Binns (1899–1971), American author
- Armon Binns (born 1989), American football player
- Bartholomew Binns (1839–1911), English executioner
- Charles Fergus Binns (1857–1935), American ceramic artist
- Cuthbert Binns, character in the Harry Potter series
- Edward Binns, (1916–1990), American actor
- Eric Binns (1924–2007), English footballer
- George Binns (1815–1847), New Zealand chartist
- Graham Binns, British general
- Henry Binns (1837–1899), Prime Minister of Natal
- Jack R. Binns (born 1933), American diplomat
- James Jepson Binns (c. 1855–1928), English pipe organ builder
- John Binns (disambiguation)
- Joseph Binns (1900–1975), British politician
- Kathryn Binns (born 1958), English long-distance runner
- Ken Binns (born 1935), Canadian squash player
- Malcolm Binns (born 1936), British pianist
- Michael Binns (born 1988), Jamaican footballer
- Pat Binns (born 1948), 30th Premier of Prince Edward Island, Canada
- Ricardo C. Binns (1945–2018), American marine
- Steve Binns (born 1960), British runner
- Stewart Binns (born 1950), British author and filmmaker
- Tom Binns (born 1970), British writer, comedian and presenter
- Tony Binns (born 1948), English-New Zealand geographer
- Vicky Binns (born 1981), English actor
- Vivienne Binns (1940–2026), Australian painter
