= Kiss of Fire (disambiguation) =

Kiss of Fire may refer to:

- "El Choclo", a 1903 song by Ángel Villoldo, also known by the English name "Kiss of Fire"
- “El Choclo”, a 1958 hit by Billy Vaughn and His Orchestra from La Paloma album
- "Kiss of Fire", a 2015 song from the album Underworld by Symphony X
- Kiss of Fire (film), a 1955 American movie directed by Joseph M. Newman and starring Jack Palance and Barbara Rush
- Goubbiah, mon amour, a 1956 French movie, known in the UK by the name Kiss of Fire
- Claudine's Return, a 1998 movie starring Christina Applegate which was released on DVD as Kiss of Fire
