= Kenneth Tigar =

American actor

- Born: Kenneth Leslie Tigar; September 24, 1942 (age 84); Chelsea, Massachusetts
- Occupations: Actor, translator
- Years active: 1975–present

Kenneth Tigar (born September 24, 1942) is an American actor, primarily on American television, and translator.

== Life ==
Kenneth Leslie Tigar was born into a Jewish family in Chelsea, Massachusetts, and raised in the Greater Boston Area.

He received his BA and Ph.D. in German literature from Harvard University. As an undergraduate, he was active in theater as both an actor and a director. He spent a year at the University of Göttingen and performed in Vienna and other European cities.

== Career ==
Tigar made his film debut in The Happy Hooker (1975). He went on to play Mr. Raymaker in Just One of the Guys (1985) and Professor Swivet in 18 Again! (1988). Tigar's later film roles include playing a bomb squad leader in Lethal Weapon 2 (1989) and Lethal Weapon 3 (1992), Weil in Primal Fear (1996), a lawyer in Conspiracy Theory (1997), and a brief but pivotal part as a German resister to Loki in The Avengers (2012).

He has appeared in numerous television shows, including starring as the short-tempered Captain Jensen in L.A. Heat from 1997 to 1999, appearing in a total of 47 episodes. He guest-starred in two episodes of Cheers, playing different characters – "The Boys in the Bar" in Season 1 as a gay character called Fred, and later in Season 4's "Don Juan Is Hell", as a professor of Diane's. He also played Dr. Gordon on Dallas, Sid Sidlevich (Maggie's boss) on Growing Pains, Fritz Heath on Dynasty, Dr. Keinholz on ER, and Walter Doyle on House of Cards, among many other roles.

== Filmography ==
=== Film ===
Year	Title	Role	Notes
1975	The Happy Hooker	Steve	Screen debut
1978	The Gypsy Warriors	SS Captain Schullman	
1981	Gangster Wars	Thomas E. Dewey	
1985	Just One of the Guys	Mr. Raymaker	
1985	Creator	Pavlo	
1987	Jake's M.O.	Sol Godlman	
1988	18 Again!	Professor Swivet	
1988	Phantasm II	Father Meyers	
1989	Lethal Weapon 2	Becker (bomb squad leader)	
1989	The Runnin' Kind	Stan Shank	
1992	Lethal Weapon 3	Becker (bomb squad leader)	
1993	My Life	Dr. Califano	
1993	Snapdragon	Captain	
1995	Jade	Corporate Man	
1995	Rage	Harry	
1996	Cadillac Ranch	Clown	(as Ken Tigar)
1996	Primal Fear	Weil	
1996	Riot	Harry Johansen	
1997	Little Bigfoot	Largo	
1997	Conspiracy Theory	Lawyer	
1997	Hollywood Safari	Sheriff Todd	
1997	A Thousand Acres	Doctor	
1997	The Underground	Tim Scully	
2000	Blessed Art Thou	Robert	
2005	Time of Fear	Coroner	
2012	The Avengers	Old German Man	
2014	The Union	Earl	
2015	Hell's Heart	Father Francis	
2017	The Post	Solicitor General Griswold	
2022	Pinball: The Man Who Saved the Game	Irving Holzman	
2023	You Hurt My Feelings	Ed	
2026	Disclosure Day	Very Old Man	

=== Television ===
Year	Production	Role	Notes
1976	The Adams Chronicles	Secretary	Miniseries
1976–81	Barney Miller	Various	6 episodes
1977	Man from Atlantis	Dr. Miller Simon	3 episodes
1977	The Waltons	Clem Beal	
1978	Actor	The Farmer	Made-for-TV movie
1978	Charlie's Angels	Danner	Episode: "Antique Angels"
1978	Kaz	Verdict in Department 12	
1978	The Rock Rainbow	Jim	Made-for-TV movie
1978	The Rockford Files	Jerry Simpson	Episode: "Local Man Eaten by Newspaper"
1979	Project U.F.O.	Ron Denby	Episode: "Sighting 4024: The Scoutmaster Incident"
1979	Barnaby Jones	Gavin Brewster	Episode: "Fatal Overture"
1979	The Golden Gate Murders	Father O'Brien	Made-for-TV movie
1980	Love, Natalie	The Guest	Made-for-TV movie
1980	Eight Is Enough	Mr. Whitney	Episode: "Jeremy"
1980	The Babysitter	Tom Montgomery	Made-for-TV movie
1981	CHiPs	Webb	Episode: "Finders Keepers"
1981	The Gangster Chronicles	Thomas E. Dewey	13 episodes
1981	Nero Wolfe	Morty Barbage	Episode: "The Blue Ribbon Hostage"
1981	Park Place	Hammond	Episode: "Crazy Judge"
1981	The Big Black Pill	Trotter	Made-for-TV movie
1981	WKRP in Cincinnati	Dr. Hunnisett	Episode: "Frog Story"
1982	Pray TV	Parker	Made-for-TV movie
1982	Bosom Buddies	Spinkus	Episode: "Hildy's Dirt Nap"
1982	The Facts of Life	Mr. Garfield	Episode: "Daddy's Girl"
1983	Knight Rider	Dr. Kempler	Episode: "Give Me Liberty... or Give Me Death"
1983	Missing Pieces	Alan Rosenus	Made-for-TV movie
1983	Special Bulletin	Dr. Abraham Sczrsma	Made-for-TV movie
1983	Thursday's Child	Bill Richardson	Made-for-TV movie
1983	Hart to Hart	Baldwin / Harold Ashby	2 episodes
1983–85	Cheers	Fred / Dr. Lowell Greenspon	2 episodes
1983–86	Hill Street Blues	Randolph Scripps	2 episodes
1984	Fatal Vision	Pathologist	Made-for-TV movie
1985	Simon & Simon	Larry Trowbridge	2 episodes
1985	Night Court	Mr. Slotkin	Episode: "The Hostage"
1986	Magnum, P.I.	Milton Collins	Episode: "Death and Taxes"
1986	Hunter	Judge Calvin Tyler	Episode: "True Confessions"
1986	Webster	Mr. Terry	Episode: "A Test of Character"
1986–93	L.A. Law	Clarence O'Malley	
1987	The Betty Ford Story	Dr. Lukash	Made-for-TV movie
1987	Dallas	Dr. Gordon	4 episodes
1987	Night Court	Gus Melman	Episode: "Her Honor, Part 4"
1987	Highway To Heaven	Mr. Meyers	Episode: "Normal People"
1987–89	Growing Pains	Sid Sidlevich	6 episodes
1988	Star Trek: The Next Generation	Margan (uncredited)	Episode: "Symbiosis"
1988–89	Dynasty	Fritz Heath	5 episodes
1989	Who's the Boss?	Mr. Timmons	Episode: "In Sam We Trust"
1990	Newhart	Game store owner	Episode: "Mom"
1992	Quantum Leap	Ben Steiner	
1993	Lois & Clark: The New Adventures of Superman	Dr. Samuel Platt	Episode: "Pilot"
1995	Beverly Hills, 90210	Mr. Warren	
1996	Murder, She Wrote	Dave Pittman	
1997	Star Trek: Voyager	Dammar	Episode: "Displaced"
1997	Sunset Beach	Dr. Anthony Moulton	2 episodes
1998	ER	Dr. Keinholz	2 episodes
1998	Route 9	Bank Manager	Made-for-TV movie
1999	The X-Files	Dr. Plant	Episode: "S.R. 819"
1999	The West Wing	Congressman Gladman	
1999	L.A. Heat	Captain Jensen	
2007	Law & Order: Criminal Intent	Terrence Winthrop	Episode: "Privilege"
2008–09	Fringe	Johan Lennox	Speaking German
2010	Boardwalk Empire	Doctor Lissenger (Dentist)	
2011	Nurse Jackie	Dentist	
2012	Elementary	Philip Armistead	
2013–18	House of Cards	Walter Doyle	4 episodes
2013–14	Alpha House	Senator Paul Mower	4 episodes
2016	Madam Secretary	Scientist	Episode: "On the Clock"
2016–19	The Man In The High Castle	Reichsführer-SS Heinrich Himmler	13 episodes
2017	Blindspot	Sean Clark	
2018–22	Bull	Judge Javonovich	2 episodes
2020–23	Hunters	Heinz Richter	2 episodes
2021	Evil	Winston	Episode: "S Is for Silence"
2021	Dopesick	Arthur Sackler	2 episodes
2023	The Marvelous Mrs. Maisel	Arthur	Episode: "The Princess and the Plea"
2024	Law & Order: Special Victims Unit	Detective (ret.) Ed McCluskey	Episode: "Marauder"
