= Bury College =

Location
- Market Street; Bury, Greater Manchester, BL9 0BG; England; 53.590214°N 2.296164°W

Information
- Type: Further Education College
- Established: 1987
- Local authority: Bury
- Department for Education URN: 130498 Tables
- Ofsted: Reports
- Principal: Charlie Deane
- Gender: Coeducational
- Age: 14 (due to GCSE courses offered)+
- Enrolment: 5,948 (2017)
- Website: www.burycollege.ac.uk

Bury College is a further education college located within the Borough of Bury, in Greater Manchester, England. The college offers A-Levels, BTECs and diplomas.

== Overview ==
Bury College is a further education college providing qualifications for school leavers pursuing A Levels, vocational qualifications and apprenticeships. It also provides courses for adults, including university qualifications run in partnership with the University of Greater Manchester.

== History ==
Bury College began as Bury Technical College. From May 1940 to May 1946, Bury Technical College was occupied by the Royal Military College of Science (Fire Control Wing) to provide specialist courses in the use of fire control instruments during the war. Following Local Government reorganisation in 1974, the college merged with Radcliffe Technical College to form the Bury Metropolitan College of Further Education.

Bury College became a tertiary college on 1 September 1987, as a result of Bury Council's decision to develop a tertiary provision system for Bury. The college was formed by the merger of the then Bury College of Further Education premises in Bury and Radcliffe with Peel Sixth Form College, Stand Sixth Form College, and a number of Youth Training Scheme units located in various parts of the borough.

== Facilities ==
- Millennium Centre - studios, laboratories, IT suites, Learning Resource Centres and classrooms.
- Beacon Centre - facilities for Performance Arts, Humanities, Languages, Health and Social Care, Childcare and Uniformed Services. A theatre, dance and rehearsal studios, together with a recording studio, language laboratory and coffee bar are situated here.
- Woodbury Centre - facilities for hair, beauty and complementary therapy salons, catering facilities and art studios.
- Venture Centre - In 2012 a development on the Woodbury site opened providing a learning resource centre, courtyard, IT facilities and classrooms.
- Prospects Centre - this is the electrical engineering centre of the college. It has specialist laboratories, workshops and IT suites for technology-based subjects.
- The Innovation Centre - for students studying Engineering and Technology courses, including the Diploma in Engineering. The building has an Engineering Workshop, IT suites, Computer-Aided Design Studio and Classrooms with information and communications technologies.
- The Aspire Centre - sports facilities for students, including exercise and fitness studios with sprung floors. In addition, the building houses the college's assessment centre for examinations and on-line testing.
- The Construction Skills Centre - is equipped with tools, equipment and machinery. It supports the college's existing applied engineering and technology centres.
- Enterprise Centre - classrooms and IT facilities.
- Bury College Nursery - a fifty-place nursery which opened in September 2004 and provides places for students with young children, and the public.

== Notable former pupils ==
=== Stand Grammar School ===
- Tony Binns, Ron Lister Professor of Geography
- Lol Creme, musician
- Lawrence Demmy, 1950s ice-dancer
- John Heilpern, drama critic
- Jack Howlett, computer scientist and director from 1961 to 1975 of the Atlas Computer Laboratory (produced many computer software innovations) (1923–30)
- Howard Jacobson, author (1953–60)
- Martin Kelner, radio broadcaster (1960–67)
- Henry Livings, playwright (1941–48)
- Philip Lowrie, plays Dennis Tanner in Coronation Street
- Norman McVicker, Leicestershire and Warwickshire cricketer
- Al Read, radio comedian
- Mark E. Smith, singer
- John Spencer, snooker player
- Julie Stevens, actress (1948–53)
- Leslie Turnberg, Baron Turnberg, Professor of Medicine from 1973 to 1997 at the University of Manchester (1945–52)

=== Stand Sixth-Form College ===
- Ivan Lewis, Labour, later Independent, MP from 1997 to 2019 for Bury South and Cabinet Minister during the Blair and Brown administrations.
- Jonathan Ashworth, Labour MP and Shadow Secretary of State for Work and Pensions, 2021–present
- Warren Hegg, former Lancashire and England cricketer
- Guy Garvey, lead singer of rock band Elbow
