= Derek and Simon: The Show =

2007 American web based series

- Genre: Comedy
- Created by: Derek Waters; Simon Helberg; Bob Odenkirk
- Developed by: Bob Odenkirk
- Written by: Derek Waters; Simon Helberg; Bob Odenkirk
- Directed by: Bob Odenkirk
- Starring: Derek Waters; Simon Helberg; Eric Edelstein; Eric Filipkowski; Jake Johnson; Ashley Johnson; Bob Odenkirk
- Composers: Davin Wood; Tim Heidecker
- Country of origin: United States
- Original language: English
- No. of seasons: 1
- No. of episodes: 13

Production
- Executive producer: Bob Odenkirk
- Producers: Eric Binns; Neil Mahoney; Naomi Odenkirk; Jason Pardo; Simon Helberg; Derek Waters
- Cinematography: Benjamin Pluimer
- Editor: Neil Mahoney
- Production company: Type-O Productions

Original release
- Network: Super Deluxe (web); Turner Broadcasting System (TV)
- Release: May 16 – August 8, 2007

Related
- Tim and Eric Awesome Show, Great Job! Tom Goes to the Mayor; Mr. Show with Bob and David

Derek and Simon: The Show is a 2007 web series created by Derek Waters, Simon Helberg, and Bob Odenkirk, which aired on the website Super Deluxe. It went through several iterations and names, starting in 2005, before the 13 episode series came to fruition.

== History ==
Derek Waters, Simon Helberg, and Bob Odenkirk first created Derek and Simon in 2005; after meeting with Waters and Helberg, Odenkirk suggested they capitalize on stories from their own lives. The project went through several different stages. First it was a pilot presentation. Then it was developed into two 15-minute segments, "Derek & Simon: A Bee and a Cigarette" and "Derek & Simon: The Pity Card", together in a half-hour pilot for HBO as The Derek & Simon Show. When it did not air, the two segments were sent to film festivals, including the Sundance Film Festival and South by Southwest Film Festival, as well as being part of Timothy McSweeney's Wholphin DVD Magazine. Matt Tobey of Comedy Central Insider called The Pity Card "hilariously irreverent". The series Derek and Simon: The Show was then developed in 2007 for Super Deluxe.

On May 7, 2008, Super Deluxe merged with adultswim.com, moving some series over to the merged site, but most of the content has now become unavailable, including this series. However, the festival version short films can still be seen.

== Series storyline ==
The show follows the exaggerated exploits of 'Simon' and 'Derek', exploring the tragic missteps that the pair encounter as 'outside' forces constantly work against them as they wander through Los Angeles, spending most of their time in bars and chasing women.

=== Supporting Characters and Guest Appearances ===
Derek Waters and Simon Helberg incorporated guest appearances from many of their comedy friends, including Bob Odenkirk, Richard Dunn, Bill Hader, Sue Foley, Samm Levine, Joe Nunez, June Diane Raphael, Casey Wilson, Marianna Palka, Busy Philipps, Michael Cera, Zach Galifianakis, Jake Johnson, Steve Agee, and Perry Caravello.

== Awards and nominations ==
- 2008, winner, 'Best web video series', Hollywood NetAwards
- 2007, nominated, 'Best Original Web Comedy Series', TV Guide Online Video Awards
