= Lisa Gottlieb =

American film director

- Born: United States
- Occupations: Director, professor
- Years active: Directing (1984–1998), Teaching (?–present)

Lisa Gottlieb is an American film, television director and college professor. She is best known for directing the 1985 film Just One of the Guys. She went on to direct the films Across the Moon (1995) starring Christina Applegate and Elizabeth Peña and Cadillac Ranch (1996) starring Christopher Lloyd and Suzy Amis.

Gottlieb is a former associate professor at the Ringling College of Art and Design. She taught filmmaking and directing at the University of Miami School of Communication, University of Southern California School of Cinema, and Columbia College Chicago. She holds a Master of Fine Arts degree in Creative Writing from Antioch University.

== Credits ==
- Just One of the Guys (1985)
- Freddy's Nightmares (1988, 1 episode)
- Dream On (1990, 1 episode)
- Across the Moon (1995)
- Cadillac Ranch (1996)
- Boy Meets World (1998, 1 episode)
