= Nancy Priddy =

American actress and singer-songwriter (born 1941)

- Born: January 22, 1941 (age 85); South Bend, Indiana
- Occupations: Actress, singer-songwriter
- Years active: 1961–2016
- Spouse: Robert Applegate (div. 1972)
- Children: Christina Applegate

Nancy Priddy (born January 22, 1941) is an American retired actress, singer and singer-songwriter. As an actress, she has appeared on many television series, including Bewitched, The Waltons and Matlock. She is the mother of actress Christina Applegate.

== Early life ==
Priddy was born on January 22, 1941, in South Bend, Indiana. She worked as a disc jockey at age 12, and majored in drama at Oberlin College and Northwestern University.

== Career ==
In the summers of 1961 and 1962, Priddy performed in musical revues as part of the Party-Liners group at the Peninsula Players theater near Fish Creek, Wisconsin. She was a member of The Bitter End Singers in 1964, a short-lived folksinging group along with Lefty Baker, Tina Bohlmann, Bob Hider, Norris O'Neill, and Vilma Vaccaro. In 1968, she released the album You've Come This Way Before, described by Billboard as "a minor classic of psychedelic folk" and by an Allmusic reviewer as "an off-the-wall singer/songwriter album drawing from both folk-rock and psychedelia". That same year she contributed backup vocals to Leonard Cohen's debut album Songs of Leonard Cohen. At one point she dated Stephen Stills and was the inspiration for his Buffalo Springfield song "Pretty Girl Why".

=== Discography ===
Under her name

- You've Come This Way Before (Dot Records, 1968)
- Christina's Carousel (Monte's Moolah, 2008)
- Mama's Jam (Monte's Moolah, n.d.)
- Can We Talk About It Now? (CD Baby, n.d.)

As member of The Bitter End Singers

- Discover the Bitter End Singers (Mercury Records, 1964)
- Through Our Eyes (Mercury Records, 1965)

As backup singer for Leonard Cohen

- Songs of Leonard Cohen (Columbia Records, 1967)

=== Television and film work ===
In the 1970s and 1980s she had several appearances in comedy and drama television series and TV movies. She appeared in Mayberry R.F.D., Police Woman, The Waltons and Divorce Court, among other shows. She made multiple appearances as different characters in Bewitched, Cannon, Medical Center and Barnaby Jones.

In 2016 she appeared in the feature-length comedy Bad Moms as Christina Applegate's mother.

== Family ==
Priddy is the mother of actress Christina Applegate, and has appeared with her in several projects, including the television series Married... with Children and the film The Sweetest Thing. Like her daughter, Priddy is a breast cancer survivor.
