= Mawer & Collingham =

Former department store in Lincoln

Mawer & Collingham was a department store located in Lincoln, England until being purchased by House of Fraser in 1980.

== History ==
William Mawer is listed as trading as a linen draper at 229 High Street in Lincoln in 1810, however it is not known when the business actually started up. William's daughter Elizabeth married Joseph Collingham, and along with William's son, also called William signed a partnership agreement in 1822 which saw the business become Mawer, Son & Co before changing to Mawer & Collingham. The business expanded and in 1826 they purchased 228 High Street to expand the premises.

By 1829 Joseph Collingham was the sole proprietor of the business, but by 1873 his son Joseph Mawer Collingham had not only joined the firm but had taken over as sole proprietor. In 1900 the business was incorporated as a private limited company, and was listed as a wholesale and retail drapers, silk mercers, haberdashers, milliners, dressmakers, tailors, hatters, furriers, lacemen, clothiers, hosiers, glovers and general outfitters, carpet warehousemen, upholsterers and house furnishers and decorators.

By the 1930s the business had grown by purchasing neighbouring stores and now formed an island surrounded by St Peter's Passage (north), High St (east), Mint St (south) and Mint Lane (west), with the store being updated in 1960/61, 1970 and again in 1973. The updates included restaurant, car parking, offices and new departments selling electrical goods. Also in the 1930s the business acquired a drapers called Berrills, based in Spalding, which they run under the Berrills name until they closed the business in 1971.

The business continued to operate as an independent company, with several members of the Collingham family on the board, until 1980 when the business was purchased by House of Fraser. The store was immediately re-branded under the Binns name and traded as such until 2003 when the store was renamed House of Fraser.
