= Across the Moon =

1995 romantic comedy film

Across the Moon is a 1995 romantic comedy directed by Lisa Gottlieb and written by Stephen Schneck.

== Synopsis ==
Carmen, a single mother from the Los Angeles barrio, and Kathy, a valley girl from Beverly Hills, agree to go on a road trip into the Mojave Desert together so that they can be near their recently incarcerated boyfriends.

== Cast ==
- Christina Applegate as Kathy
- Elizabeth Peña as Carmen
- Michael Aniel Mundra as Paco, Carmen's son
- Tony Fields as Ritchie, Carmen's ex
- Peter Berg as Lyle, Kathy's boyfriend
- James Remar as Rattlesnake Jim, Carmen's boyfriend
- Michael McKean as Frank, an animal wrangler who befriends Paco
- Burgess Meredith as Barney
- Jack Nance as Old Cowboy
- Perry Caravello as Prison Extra

== Reception ==
The film received mixed reviews from critics, with praise for its cast and cinematography but criticism for its script. Ken Eisner of Variety wrote that Elizabeth Pena's performance was a highlight of the film, which was otherwise "mildly engaging."
