= John Binns =

John Binns may refer to:

- John Binns (Irish politician) (died 1804), Irish politician
- John Binns (journalist) (1772–1860), Irish journalist
- John Binns (cricketer) (1870–1934), English cricketer
- John Binns (British politician) (1914–1986), British politician

== See also ==
- Jack Binns (disambiguation)
