= Jack Binns =

Jack Binns may refer to:

- Jack Binns (wireless operator) (1884–1959), British sailor and wireless telegraph operator
- Jack R. Binns (born 1933), American diplomat

== See also ==
- John Binns (disambiguation)
