= Cadillac Ranch (film) =

- Directed by: Lisa Gottlieb
- Written by: Jennifer Cecil
- Produced by: J. Todd Harris; Harvey Kahn
- Starring: Christopher Lloyd; Suzy Amis
- Cinematography: Bruce Douglas Johnson
- Edited by: Dan Loewenthal
- Music by: Christopher Tyng
- Release date: January 13, 1996 (Palm Springs)
- Running time: 95 minutes 104 minutes
- Country: United States
- Language: English

Cadillac Ranch is a 1996 American comedy drama film written by Jennifer Cecil, directed by Lisa Gottlieb and starring Christopher Lloyd and Suzy Amis.

== Cast ==
- Suzy Amis as CJ Crowley
- Renee Humphrey as Mary Catherine Crowley
- Caroleen Feeney as Frances Crowley
- Linden Ashby as Beau
- Jim Metzler as Travis Crowley
- Christopher Lloyd as Wood Grimes

== Release ==
The film premiered at the Palm Springs International Film Festival on January 13, 1996.

== Reception ==
Leonard Maltin awarded the film two and a half stars. Russell Smith of The Austin Chronicle awarded the film two stars out of five.

TV Guide gave the film a mixed to positive review: "On the other hand, Cadillac Ranch is rather more successful in its shallower goal to be a pure action comedy, benefiting from jaunty direction and appealing performances by the lead actresses."

Todd McCarthy of Variety gave the film a positive review and wrote, "Lisa Gottlieb’s nimble, unflashy direction certainly represents an improvement on her 1985 debut feature, Just One of the Guys."
