= Christina Applegate =

American actress (born 1971)

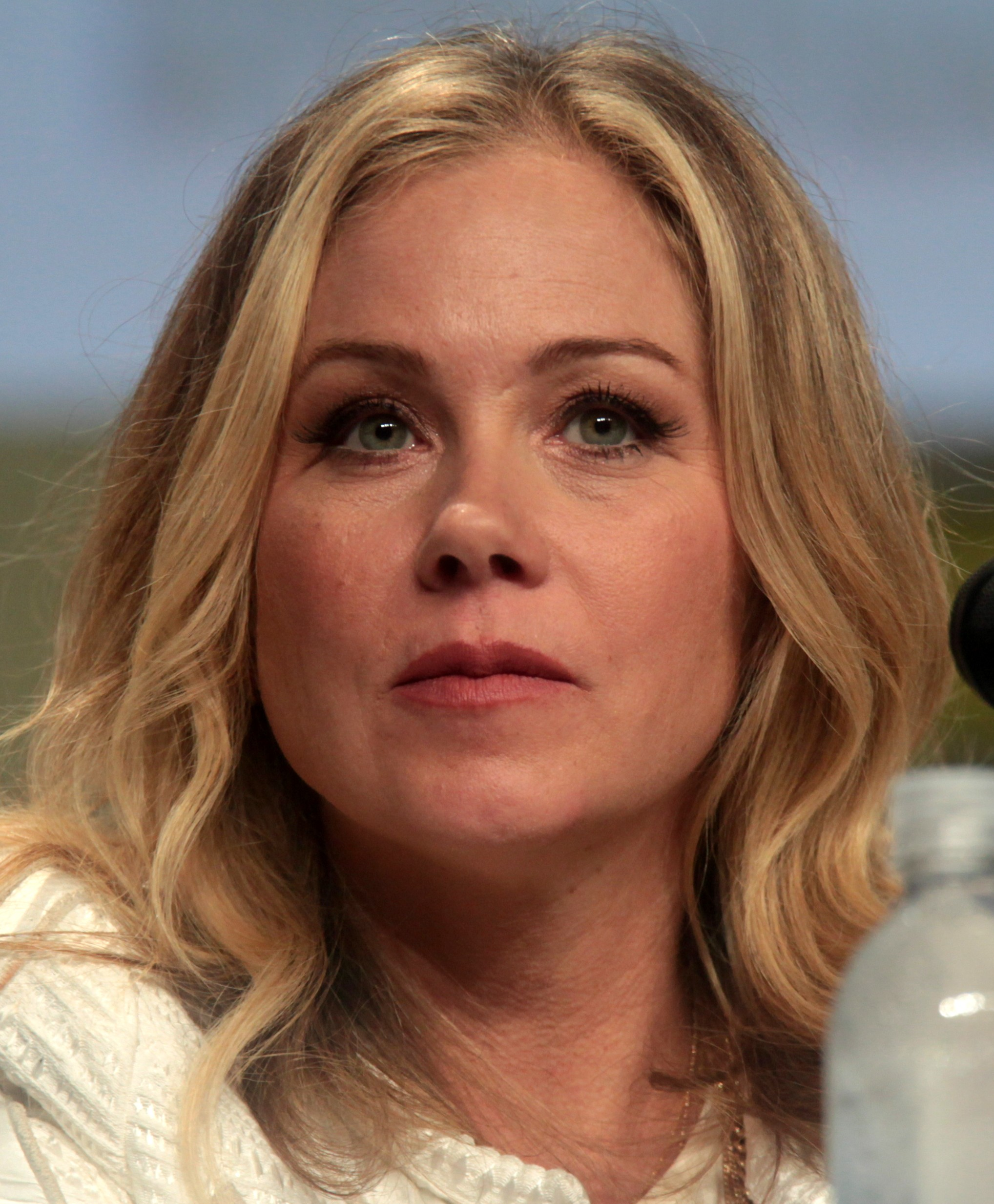
- Applegate in 2014
- Born: November 25, 1971 (age 54); Los Angeles, California, U.S.
- Occupation: Actress
- Years active: 1972–2022
- Known for: Married... with Children
- Spouses: Johnathon Schaech (m. 2001; div. 2007); Martyn LeNoble (m. 2013)
- Children: 1
- Mother: Nancy Priddy
- Awards: Primetime Emmy Award for Outstanding Guest Actress in a Comedy Series

Christina Applegate (born November 25, 1971) is a retired American actress. She gained recognition in the late 1980s for playing Kelly Bundy in the Fox sitcom Married... with Children (1987–1997). Her titular role in the sitcom Jesse (1998–2000), earned her first nomination for the Golden Globe Award for Best Actress – Television Series Musical or Comedy. For her guest role in the NBC sitcom Friends (2002–2003), she won the Primetime Emmy Award for Outstanding Guest Actress in a Comedy Series. She received additional Emmy and Golden Globe nominations for her roles in the television sitcom Samantha Who? (2007–2009), starred in a short-lived sitcom Up All Night (2011–2012), and the dark tragicomedy series Dead to Me (2019–2022). Applegate served as a producer of all three aforementioned projects.

Applegate has achieved success in films of varying genres, particularly in comedies such as Don't Tell Mom the Babysitter's Dead (1991), The Big Hit (1998), The Sweetest Thing (2002), Anchorman: The Legend of Ron Burgundy (2004) and Anchorman 2: The Legend Continues (2013), Hall Pass (2011), Vacation (2015), Bad Moms (2016), and Crash Pad (2017). On stage, Applegate received a nomination for the Tony Award for Best Actress in a Musical for her debut performance as the title character in the Broadway musical revival Sweet Charity (2005).

After being diagnosed with multiple sclerosis in August 2021, Applegate announced she would step away from appearing on-screen, but would continue doing voice work. In October 2026, she reported that she had been misdiagnosed and instead has an as-yet-unidentified illness with symptoms that mirror MS.

Applegate published a memoir in 2026, You with the Sad Eyes, which became a New York Times Best Seller, in which she focused on resilience and self-acceptance.

== Early and family life ==
Applegate was born on November 25, 1971, in Hollywood, Los Angeles, California. Her father, Robert William "Bobby" Applegate (1942–2025), was a staff producer at Dot Records; her mother, Nancy Priddy, is a singer and actress. She was named after the Andrew Wyeth painting Christina's World, for which her mother also named a song on her album You've Come This Way Before. Her parents separated shortly after her birth and Christina was raised by her mother. She has two half-siblings, Alisa and Kyle, from her father's second marriage. As a child, Applegate trained as a dancer in various styles, including jazz and ballet.

== Career ==
=== 1972–1986: Early projects ===
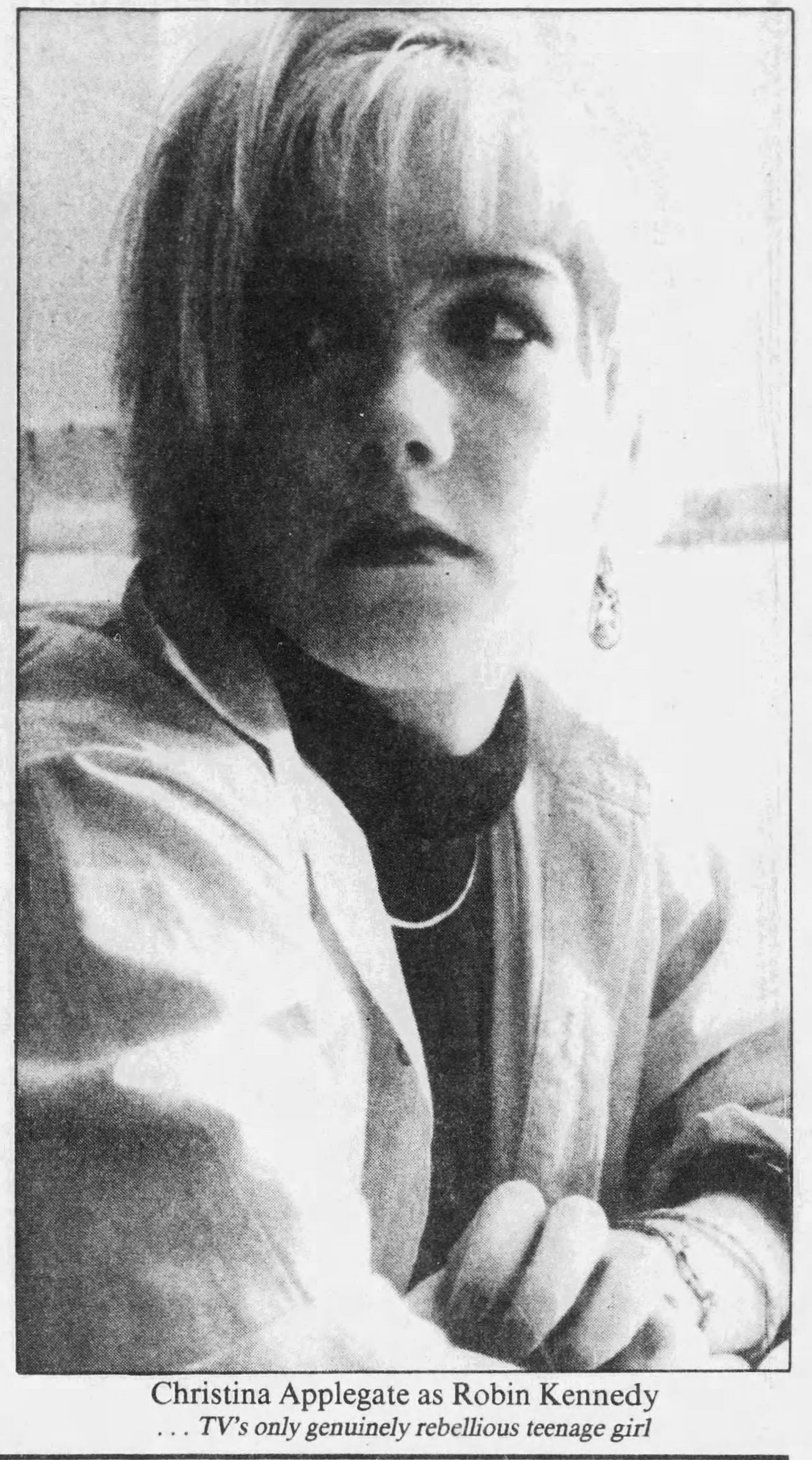
Newspaper clipping, November 2, 1986

Applegate made her television debut in 1972 alongside her mother in the soap opera Days of Our Lives and starred in a commercial for Playtex baby bottles at 3 months old. She made her film debut in the 1981 horror film Jaws of Satan (or King Cobra) and appeared in the 1981 movie Beatlemania. She debuted as a young Grace Kelly in the television biopic Grace Kelly (1983) and appeared in her first television series in Showtime's political comedy Washingtoon (1985), in which she played a congressman's daughter.

Applegate was a guest in the series Father Murphy (1981), Charles in Charge (1984–1985), and Silver Spoons (1986). In 1986, she won the role of Robin Kennedy, a policeman's daughter, in the police drama series Heart of the City (1986–1987). For her performance, she received a Young Artist Award. She guest-starred in several television series, including All Is Forgiven, Still the Beaver, Amazing Stories, and Family Ties.

=== 1987–2001: Breakthrough and Married... with Children ===
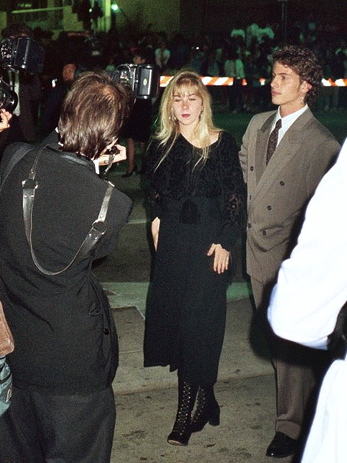
Applegate at the Governor's Ball following the 41st Primetime Emmy Awards, September 1989

From 1987 to 1997, Applegate played the ditzy, sexually promiscuous daughter, Kelly Bundy, on Fox's first sitcom, Married... with Children. While working on the series, Applegate was seen in Dance 'til Dawn (1988) and Streets (1990), in which a teenage drug addict is stalked by a psychotic police officer. She guest-starred in 21 Jump Street (1988) and Top of the Heap (1991) and hosted Saturday Night Live (1993) and MADtv (1996). The character of Sue Ellen Crandell in the black comedy feature Don't Tell Mom the Babysitter's Dead (1991) was Applegate's first starring role in a mainstream film, playing a rebellious teenager who is forced to take care of siblings after their summer babysitter dies. She had roles in films such as Vibrations (1995), Across the Moon (1995), Wild Bill (1995), Tim Burton's Mars Attacks! (1996), and Gregg Araki's Nowhere (1997). Contrary to reports, she did not audition for Titanic, as she told Vanity Fair in their May 2023 edition: "No. Who said that?…That would not have come across my desk, if I had a desk." [Shaw, Vanity Fair, May 4, 2023.] When Married... with Children was cancelled in 1997, producers pitched a spinoff centered on Kelly Bundy, but Applegate declined.

In 1998, Applegate starred as Claudine Van Doozen in the independent feature Claudine's Return (or Kiss of Fire), appeared in the action-comedy The Big Hit and played the fiancée of a mob boss in the Mafia satire Jane Austen's Mafia.

Applegate was one of the founding members of The Pussycat Dolls that debuted at Johnny Depp's Viper Room on the Sunset Strip in 1995. She emceed for the group when they moved to The Roxy Theatre in 2002.

=== 2002–2009: Anchorman, stage, and television ===
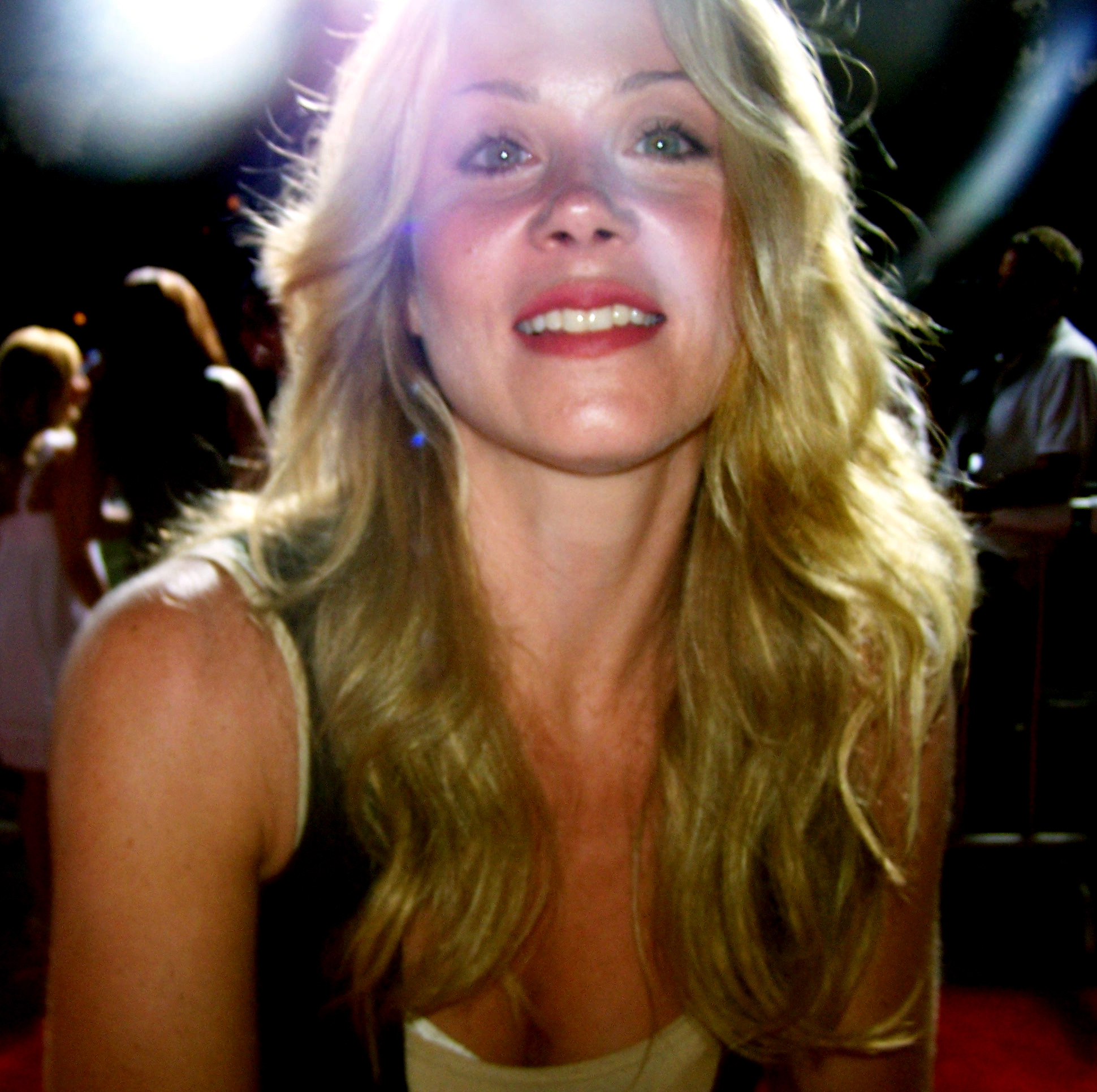
Applegate in 2004

Applegate played the dual role of a 12th-century noblewoman, Princess Rosalind, and her 21st-century descendant, Julia Malfete, in the time-travel comedy Just Visiting (2001). She was Princess Gwendolyn and Kate in the movie Prince Charming (2001). After playing Cameron Diaz's level-headed best friend, Courtney Rockcliffe, in The Sweetest Thing (2002), she appeared in Heroes (2002), the romantic airplane comedy View from the Top (2003), the true-crime film Wonderland (2003) based on the Wonderland murders, and the Gram Parsons biopic Grand Theft Parsons (2003). In 2004, she starred with Ben Affleck in the holiday comedy Surviving Christmas and with Matt Dillon in Employee of the Month. She was the executive producer of Comforters, Miserable (2001).

Applegate guest-starred on Friends in the ninth (2002) and tenth (2003) seasons in episodes titled "The One with Rachel's Other Sister" and "The One Where Rachel's Sister Babysits" as Amy Green, Rachel Green's (Jennifer Aniston) sister. She won the Primetime Emmy Award from two nominations for Outstanding Guest Actress in a Comedy Series for her performance in "The One with Rachel's Other Sister."

Applegate received recognition for her portrayal of anchorwoman Veronica Corningstone in the 2004 comedy films Anchorman: The Legend of Ron Burgundy and Wake Up, Ron Burgundy: The Lost Movie, an alternative film comprising alternate takes and deleted scenes and story elements.

Applegate has performed on stage in The Axeman's Jazz, Nobody Leaves Empty Handed, The Runthrough, and John Cassavetes' The Third Day (co-starring Gena Rowlands). In 2004, she debuted on Broadway as Charity Hope Valentine in a revival of the 1966 musical Sweet Charity. In late April 2005, she took part in the annual Broadway Cares' Easter Bonnet Competition, being sawed in half by a magician in their Clearly Impossible sawing illusion. Sweet Charity ended its Broadway run on December 31, 2005. Applegate won the 2005 Theatre World Award and was nominated for a 2005 Tony Award for Best Actress in a Musical for her role in the musical.

While appearing in Sweet Charity, Applegate broke her foot and it was announced that the musical would close during previews. She persuaded the producers to change their minds. Because of her injury, she had to wear special shoes to prevent another accident. In a 2013 interview, she said that because of what happened, she "actually can't dance anymore. And that is sad for me because I always wanted to go back. But I probably won't be able to." She does dance whenever the opportunity presents, but cannot perform in strenuous roles.

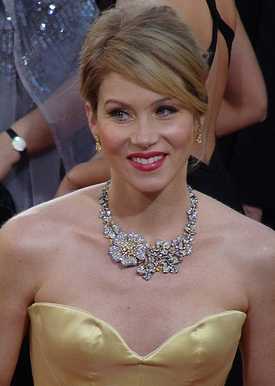
Applegate at the 66th Golden Globe Awards in January 2009

In 2006, Applegate appeared in Jessica Simpson's music video for "A Public Affair" with Eva Longoria, Ryan Seacrest, and Christina Milian. She starred in the ABC comedy Samantha Who? from October 15, 2007, until it was cancelled on May 18, 2009; the finale aired on July 23, 2009. The series co-starred Jean Smart, Jennifer Esposito, and Melissa McCarthy and focused on a 30-year-old who, after a hit-and-run accident, develops amnesia and has to rediscover her life, her relationships, and herself. She received two nominations for the Primetime Emmy Award for Outstanding Lead Actress in a Comedy Series and two nominations for the Golden Globe Award for Best Actress – Television Series Musical or Comedy. Shortly after the cancellation was announced, she began a campaign to get the show back into production, which failed. She topped the list of People's Most Beautiful People in 2009. She appeared with her Married... with Children co-star David Faustino in an episode of Faustino's comedy series Star-ving.

=== 2010–present: Dead to Me and further acclaim ===
Applegate voiced Catherine the Cat in the three-dimensional talking animal sequel Cats & Dogs: The Revenge of Kitty Galore (2010). She said her mother wanted her to be involved in the film. Prior to Cats & Dogs 2, she voiced Brittany, one of the Chipettes, in Alvin and the Chipmunks: The Squeakquel (2009), Alvin and the Chipmunks: Chipwrecked (2011), and Alvin and the Chipmunks: The Road Chip (2015).

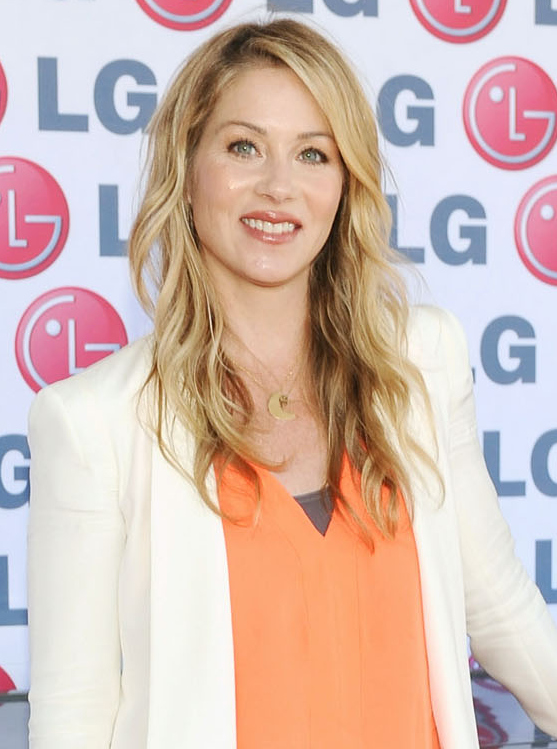
Applegate in June 2012

In 2011, Applegate starred in the Farrelly brothers comedy Hall Pass. Applegate also starred in the NBC sitcom Up All Night with Maya Rudolph and Will Arnett, which debuted on September 14, 2011. On February 8, 2013, she left the series after its second-season hiatus, which was leading into a planned format change. The series was ultimately cancelled.

On July 31, 2013, Applegate was featured on the second episode of the fourth season of the revived American version of the TLC series Who Do You Think You Are?. The episode centered on Applegate trying to find information about her paternal grandmother, Lavina Applegate Walton, who was absent for most of Applegate's father's life and died when he was young. Applegate learned that Walton died in 1955 from tuberculosis and alcohol-related cirrhosis.

In 2013, Applegate reprised her role as Veronica Corningstone in the comedy sequel film Anchorman 2: The Legend Continues. The film received positive reviews from critics and was a box office success. In 2014, she had a starring voice role as Mary Beth in the animated musical fantasy film The Book of Life. In 2015, she starred with Ed Helms in the National Lampoon sequel Vacation, the fifth full-length movie episode of the road-trip comedies. They played Rusty Griswold and his wife, Debbie, who with their two sons take a trip to Walley World, just as Rusty did with his parents in the 1983 original film, National Lampoon's Vacation. The film was poorly reviewed, but was a box office success. In 2016, she starred as Gwendolyn James in the comedy film Bad Moms with Mila Kunis, Kristen Bell, and Kathryn Hahn. The film earned mixed reviews from critics and was a box office success.

In July 2018, Applegate co-starred with Linda Cardellini in the Netflix dark comedy series Dead to Me and executive produced the series with Will Ferrell, Adam McKay, and Jessica Elbaum. The series received critical acclaim. Applegate received two nominations for the Primetime Emmy Award for Outstanding Lead Actress in a Comedy Series for her performance in seasons one and two.

On November 14, 2022, she received a star on Hollywood Walk of Fame. She was accompanied by her Married... with Children co-stars Katey Sagal and David Faustino. Her star was placed adjacent to Sagal and Ed O'Neill's stars.

In 2024, Applegate began a podcast with fellow actress with multiple sclerosis Jamie-Lynn Sigler called MeSsy about their friendship based on the condition. In January 2026, Sigler credited Applegate with inspiring her to be more public about her own MS condition.

Applegate released her memoir, You with the Sad Eyes, in March 2026, topping The New York Times Best Seller list in its first week of sales.

== Personal life ==
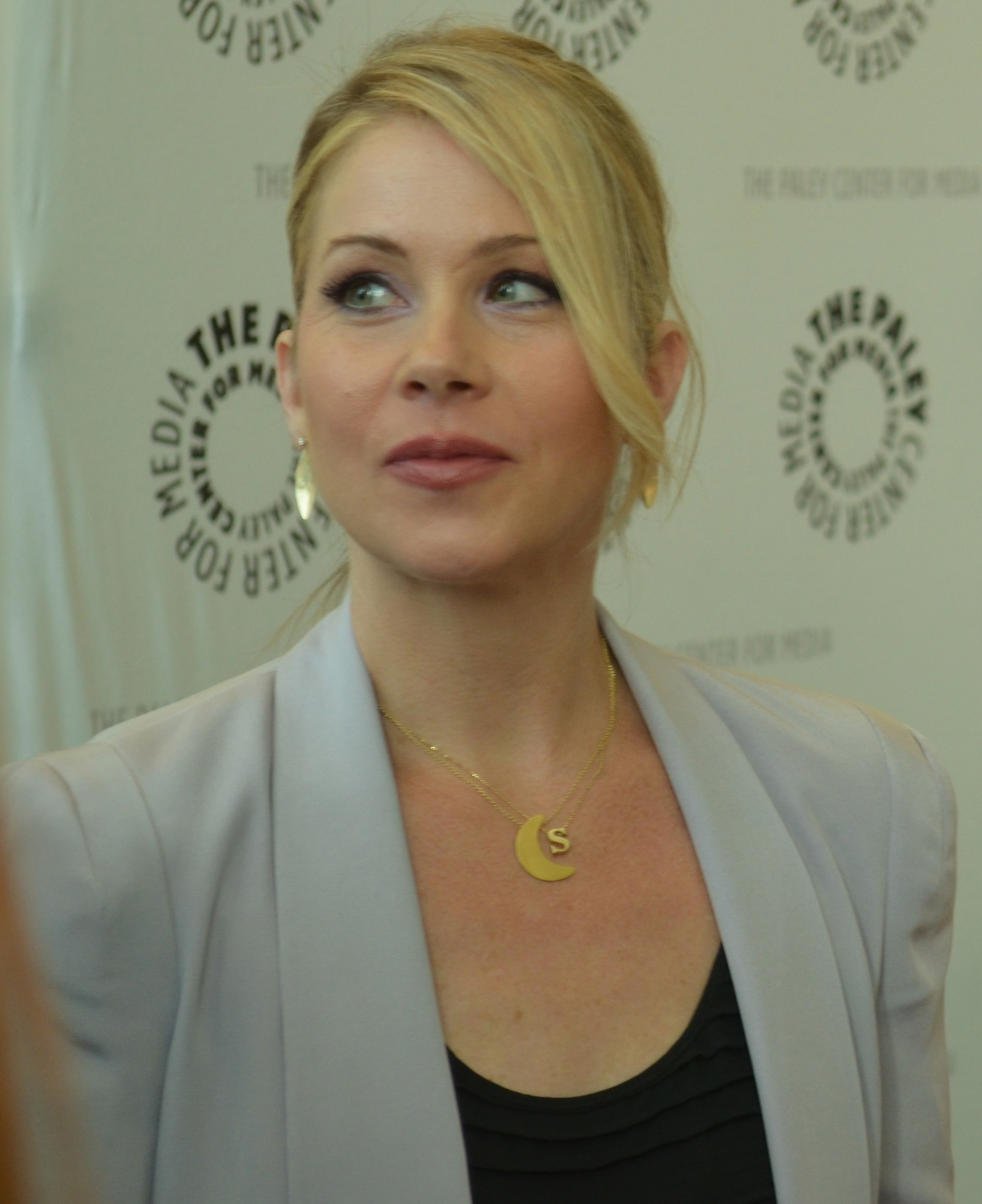
Applegate attending the Up All Night cast panel at PaleyFest in 2012

Applegate married actor Johnathon Schaech in Palm Springs, on October 20, 2001. Schaech filed for divorce in December 2005, citing irreconcilable differences, and the divorce was finalized in August 2007. She began dating Dutch musician Martyn LeNoble in 2009. The couple became engaged on Valentine's Day 2010 and married on February 23, 2013, at their Los Angeles home. It was the second marriage for both. They have one daughter, Sadie, born in January 2011.

=== Health ===
People reported on August 3, 2008 that Applegate had been diagnosed with breast cancer. A representative stated, "Christina Applegate was diagnosed with an early stage of breast cancer. Detected early through doctor-ordered MRI, the cancer was not life-threatening. Christina is following the recommended treatment of her doctors and will have a full recovery." It was announced that she was cancer-free after a double mastectomy, although cancer had been found in only one breast. She inherited a genetic trait, BRCA1, which can trigger breast and ovarian cancer. Her mother is also a breast cancer survivor. Applegate said when she was diagnosed, "I was just shaking and then also immediately, I had to go into 'take care of business mode'."

Applegate announced on August 10, 2021 that she had received a diagnosis of multiple sclerosis a few months before. The disease significantly affected her ability to perform in the final season of Dead to Me, for whose success she credits her co-star Linda Cardellini and showrunner Liz Feldman's support and openness in making reasonable adjustments to her filming schedule.

Applegate said in February 2023 that, because of her illness, she would probably no longer act on camera, but would be open to voice-over work, such as a planned animated revival of Married... with Children, as well as working behind the scenes.

During an appearance on GMA in March 2024, Applegate acknowledged now having "a tremor" from her MS condition.

In March 2026, The New York Times reported that Applegate had retired. On an episode of Wild Card with Rachel Martin the same month, Applegate informed NPR journalist Rachel Martin that her death was "looming" and that she had bought a burial plot.

In October 2026, Applegate reported that she was misdiagnosed with MS, leaving her "at square one" seeking a diagnosis.

== Philanthropy ==
Applegate has supported EIF, Adopt-A-Classroom, MPTF, WSPA, and the Trevor Project. In 2003, she was the spokesman for the Lee National Denim Day, which raises millions of dollars for breast cancer education and research. Following her breast cancer diagnosis, she appeared on a TV special, Stand Up to Cancer, designed to raise funds for breast cancer research. The one-hour special was broadcast on CBS, NBC, and ABC on September 5, 2008.

In 2009, Applegate announced plans to return as the ambassador for Lee National Denim Day. Also in 2009, she founded Right Action for Women, a charitable foundation dedicated to breast-cancer screening for women and focused on the type of MRI scan that saved her life. In February 2015, she was awarded the Saint Vintage Love Cures Award at the 2nd annual unite4:humanity event hosted by Variety magazine for her dedication to and work with Right Action for Women.

== Filmography ==
=== Film ===
Year	Title	Role	Notes
1981	Jaws of Satan	Kim Perry	
1981	Beatlemania	Dancer	
1990	Streets	Dawn	
1991	Don't Tell Mom the Babysitter's Dead	Sue Ellen Crandell	
1995	Across the Moon	Kathy	
1995	Vibrations	Anamika	
1995	Wild Bill	Lurline Newcomb	
1996	Mars Attacks!	Sharona	
1997	Nowhere	Dingbat	
1998	Jane Austen's Mafia!	Diane Steen	
1998	The Big Hit	Pam Schulman	
1998	Claudine's Return	Claudine Van Doozen	
1999	Out in Fifty	Lilah	
2000	The Brutal Truth	Emily	
2001	Just Visiting	Princess Rosaline / Julia Malfete	
2001	Sol Goode	Girl at the Bar	Uncredited
2002	The Sweetest Thing	Courtney Rockcliffe	
2002	Heroes	Wife	Short film
2003	Grand Theft Parsons	Barbara	
2003	Wonderland	Susan Launius	
2003	View from the Top	Christine Montgomery	
2004	Surviving Christmas	Alicia Valco	
2004	Anchorman: The Legend of Ron Burgundy	Veronica Corningstone	
2004	Wake Up, Ron Burgundy: The Lost Movie	Veronica Corningstone	
2004	Employee of the Month	Sara Goodwin	
2005	Tilt-A-Whirl	Customer #1	Short film
2007	Farce of the Penguins	Melissa	Voice role
2008	The Rocker	Kim Powell	
2009	Alvin and the Chipmunks: The Squeakquel	Brittany Miller	Voice role
2010	Going the Distance	Corinne	
2010	Cats & Dogs: The Revenge of Kitty Galore	Catherine	Voice role
2011	Hall Pass	Grace	
2011	Alvin and the Chipmunks: Chipwrecked	Brittany Miller	Voice role
2013	Anchorman 2: The Legend Continues	Veronica Corningstone-Burgundy	
2014	The Book of Life	Mary Beth	Voice role
2015	Vacation	Debbie Fletcher Griswold	
2015	Alvin and the Chipmunks: The Road Chip	Brittany Miller	Voice role
2016	Youth in Oregon	Kate Gleason	
2016	Bad Moms	Gwendolyn James	
2017	Crash Pad	Morgan Dott	
2017	A Bad Moms Christmas	Gwendolyn James	Cameo

=== Television ===
Year	Title	Role	Notes
1972	Days of Our Lives	Baby Burt Grizzell	3 months old
1981	Father Murphy	Ada	Episode: "A Horse from Heaven"
1983	Grace Kelly	Young Grace Kelly	Television film
1984–1985	Charles in Charge	Stacy	2 episodes
1985	Washingtoon	Sally Forehead	10 episodes
1986	Silver Spoons	Jeannie Bolens	Episode: "A Family Affair"
1986	All Is Forgiven	Simone	Episode: "Mother's Day"
1986	Still the Beaver	Mandy / Wendy	2 episodes
1986	Amazing Stories	Holly	Episode: "Welcome to My Nightmare"
1986–1987	Heart of the City	Robin Kennedy	13 episodes
1987	Family Ties	Kitten	Episode: "Band on the Run"
1987–1997	Married... with Children	Kelly Bundy	Main role; 256 episodes
1988	Dance 'til Dawn	Patrice Johnson	Television film
1988	21 Jump Street	Tina	Episode: "I'm Okay, You Need Work"
1990	The Earth Day Special	Kelly Bundy	Television special
1991	Top of the Heap	Kelly Bundy	2 episodes
1993	Saturday Night Live	Herself / Host	Episode: "Christina Applegate/Midnight Oil"
1996	Mad TV	Herself /Host	Episode: "#201"
1997	Pauly	Mariah	Episode: "Through the Ringers"
1998–2000	Jesse	Jesse Warner	42 episodes; also co-producer
2001	Prince Charming	Kate / Princess Gwendolyn	Television film
2002–2003	Friends	Amy Green	2 episodes
2004	King of the Hill	Colette / Attorney (voice)	Episode: "My Hair Lady"
2004	Father of the Pride	Candy (voice)	Episode: "One Man's Meat Is Another Man's Girlfriend"
2005	Suzanne's Diary for Nicholas	Dr. Suzanne Bedford	Television film
2007–2009	Samantha Who?	Samantha "Sam" Newly	35 episodes; also producer
2008	Reno 911!	Seemji	Episode: "Did Garcia Steal Dangle's Husband?"
2009	Star-ving	Herself	Episode: "Married with Children...The Movie"
2011–2012	Up All Night	Reagan Brinkley	35 episodes; also producer
2011–2014	So You Think You Can Dance	Herself / Guest Judge	8 episodes
2012	Saturday Night Live	Herself / Host	Episode: "Christina Applegate/Passion Pit"
2015	Web Therapy	Jenny Bologna	2 episodes
2015	The Muppets	Herself	Episode: "Bear Left Then Bear Write"
2015	The Grinder	Gail Budnick	Episode: "A Bittersweet Grind (Une Mouture Amer)"
2018	Ask the Storybots	The Baker	Episode: "Why Can't I Eat Dessert All the Time?"
2019–2022	Dead to Me	Jen Harding	30 episodes; also executive producer

=== Theatre ===
Year	Title	Role	Venue
2005	Sweet Charity	Charity Hope Valentine	Al Hirschfeld Theatre

=== Music videos ===
Year	Title	Role	Artist
1990	"Rattlesnake Kisses"	Girl	Electric Angels
2006	"A Public Affair"	Herself	Jessica Simpson

== Awards and nominations ==
Year	Association	Category	Nominated work	Result	Ref.
1987	Young Artist Awards	Exceptional Performance By a Young Actress in a New Television Series	Heart of the City	Won	
1988	Young Artist Awards	Best Young Actress Starring in a New Television Comedy Series	Married... with Children	Nominated	
1989	Young Artist Awards	Best Young Actress Starring in a Television Comedy Series	Married... with Children	Won	
1992	Nickelodeon Kids' Choice Awards	Favorite TV Actress	Married... with Children	Nominated	
1992	MTV Movie Awards	Most Desirable Female	Don't Tell Mom the Babysitter's Dead	Nominated	
1992	Young Artist Awards	Outstanding Young Ensemble Cast in a Motion Picture	Don't Tell Mom the Babysitter's Dead	Nominated	
1999	Golden Globe Awards	Best Actress - Television Series Musical or Comedy	Jesse	Nominated	
1999	People's Choice Awards	Favorite Female Performer in a New Television Series	Jesse	Won	
1999	TV Guide Awards	Favorite Star in a New Series	Jesse	Won	
2003	Teen Choice Awards	Choice Movie Villain	View from the Top	Nominated	
2003	Primetime Emmy Awards	Outstanding Guest Actress in a Comedy Series	Friends	Won	
2004	Primetime Emmy Awards	Outstanding Guest Actress in a Comedy Series	Friends	Nominated	
2005	Tony Awards	Best Actress in a Musical	Sweet Charity	Nominated	
2005	Drama Desk Awards	Outstanding Actress in a Musical	Sweet Charity	Nominated	
2005	Theatre World Awards	Theatre World Award	Sweet Charity	Won	
2008	Golden Globe Awards	Best Actress – Television Series Musical or Comedy	Samantha Who?	Nominated	
2008	Screen Actors Guild Awards	Outstanding Performance by a Female Actor in a Comedy Series	Samantha Who?	Nominated	
2008	Teen Choice Awards	Choice Comedy TV Actress	Samantha Who?	Nominated	
2008	Television Critics Association Awards	Individual Achievement in Comedy	Samantha Who?	Nominated	
2008	Satellite Awards	Best Actress – Television Series Musical or Comedy	Samantha Who?	Nominated	
2008	Primetime Emmy Awards	Outstanding Lead Actress in a Comedy Series	Samantha Who?	Nominated	
2009	Golden Globe Awards	Best Actress – Television Series Musical or Comedy	Samantha Who?	Nominated	
2009	Primetime Emmy Awards	Outstanding Lead Actress in a Comedy Series	Samantha Who?	Nominated	
2009	Screen Actors Guild Awards	Outstanding Performance by a Female Actor in a Comedy Series	Samantha Who?	Nominated	
2009	TV Land Awards	Innovator Award	Married... with Children	Won	
2009	People's Choice Awards	Favorite Female TV Star	Samantha Who?	Won	
2010	Screen Actors Guild Awards	Outstanding Performance by a Female Actor in a Comedy Series	Samantha Who?	Nominated	
2012	Satellite Awards	Best Actress — Television Series Musical or Comedy	Up All Night	Nominated	
2014	Teen Choice Awards	Choice Movie Actress – Comedy	Anchorman 2: The Legend Continues	Nominated	
2019	Primetime Emmy Awards	Outstanding Lead Actress in a Comedy Series	Dead to Me	Nominated	
2020	Golden Globe Awards	Best Actress – Television Series Musical or Comedy	Dead to Me	Nominated	
2020	Critics' Choice Television Awards	Best Actress in a Comedy Series	Dead to Me	Nominated	
2020	Screen Actors Guild Awards	Outstanding Performance by a Female Actor in a Comedy Series	Dead to Me	Nominated	
2020	Satellite Awards	Best Actress in a Musical or Comedy Series	Dead to Me	Nominated	
2020	Television Critics Association Awards	Individual Achievement in Comedy	Dead to Me	Nominated	
2020	Primetime Emmy Awards	Outstanding Comedy Series	Dead to Me	Nominated	
2020	Primetime Emmy Awards	Outstanding Lead Actress in a Comedy Series	Dead to Me	Nominated	
2021	Critics' Choice Television Awards	Best Actress in a Comedy Series	Dead to Me	Nominated	
2021	Satellite Awards	Best Actress in a Musical or Comedy Series	Dead to Me	Nominated	
2021	Screen Actors Guild Awards	Outstanding Performance by a Female Actor in a Comedy Series	Dead to Me	Nominated	
2021	Screen Actors Guild Awards	Outstanding Performance by an Ensemble in a Comedy Series	Dead to Me	Nominated	
2023	Critics’ Choice Television Awards	Best Actress in a Comedy Series	Dead to Me	Nominated	
2023	AARP Movies for Grownups Awards	Best Actress (TV)	Dead to Me	Nominated	
2023	Screen Actors Guild Awards	Outstanding Performance by a Female Actor in a Comedy Series	Dead to Me	Nominated	
2023	Primetime Emmy Awards	Outstanding Lead Actress in a Comedy Series	Dead to Me	Nominated	
