= Paige Jansen-Nichols =

American jewelry designer

- Born: Providence, Rhode Island
- Occupation: Jewelry designer

Paige Jansen-Nichols is an American Jewelry designer of the brand Saint Vintage. She is chief executive officer of Jansen Advertising. She is chief executive officer and head dreamer of the brand Dream Pets.

== Early life ==
Jansen-Nichols was born in Providence, Rhode Island, and now resides in Atlanta, Georgia, since the late 1970s. Her grandparents also worked in the jewelry business. After school, she attended Brenau University.

== Career ==
Nichols is known for her hand-crafted designs with vintage and antique embellishments. She uses semiprecious stones, Swarovski crystals, vintage beads, antique glass and antique pearls.

She launched her own company, Jansen Advertising. in 1993. She has been acknowledged by various business groups for her contribution to the advertising field, including the Atlanta Business Chronicle and Coca-Cola.

In March 2007, Paige Jansen-Nichols created the jewelry line, Saint Vintage after being diagnosed with two unrelated types of cancer. She donates fifty percent of all Saint Vintage profits to cancer research organizations, including Stand Up 2 Cancer. A number of celebrities are following and contributing her work, such as Bryce Dallas Howard, Lacey Chabert, Rachel Bilson, and Jaime King.

As a cancer survivor, she has dedicated her mission to fund cancer research, which is Saint Vintage's primary goal. The Saint Vintage jewelry collections are historically inspired.

In February 2015, Jansen-Nichols presented actress and cancer survivor advocate Christina Applegate, with the first annual “Saint Vintage Love Cures Award” at the 2nd Annual unite4:humanity Event hosted by Variety Magazine. Paige Jansen-Nichols works with nonprofit organizations such as CURE Childhood Cancer and Stand Up to Cancer each year to donate to cancer research.

Jansen-Nichols was covered on Extra in January 2014 for her design aesthetic and dedication to giving back to cancer research.

In 2014 Nichols was speaker at Variety´s Power of Women luncheon.

=== Dream Pets ===
In 2005, Paige Jansen-Nichols began anticipating ownership of her favorite childhood collectible – the Dream Pets. She watched and waited after Big Lots purchased and made the decision to liquidate the remaining inventory. Paige knew her dream could become a reality if she could just be patient and attentive. By 2014, the waiting was finally over and she immediately moved forward to acquire the brand. Paige as a child had been inspired to create her Dream Pets larger, softer and more durable – so they could better withstand the love and imagination of children. But her Dream Pets continue the whimsy and uniqueness of R. Dakin’s original designs and handmade feel.
