= Guy & Smith =

Former department store in Grimsby

Guy & Smith was a department store located in Grimsby and is now part of House of Fraser.

== History ==
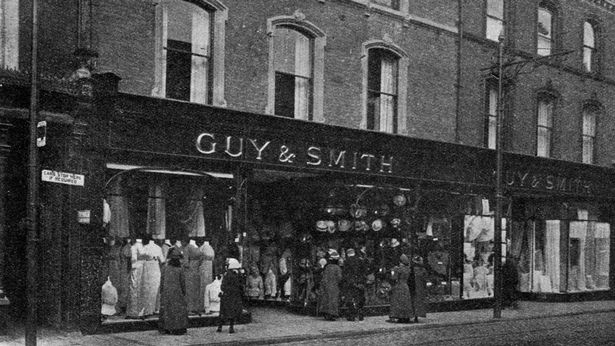
Guy & Smith on Victoria Street, Grimsby in 1913

Joseph Guy opened a drapery store in October 1850 on North St Mary's Gate, which had been home to Mr Snow's drapery business since 1801. By 1871 he had taken on a partner, Joseph Smith and new premises trading as Guy & Smith at 19 Victoria Street, Grimsby. By 1913 the store had been rebuilt and its departments were costume and dress goods, millinery, silks, children's outfitters and furnishings. The business was incorporated in 1920, and continued to expand purchasing neighbouring shops including the business of Lister's China shop and Holder Brothers piano store.

The business continued to be an independent company until 1969 when House of Fraser bought the store. The following year the business was renamed Binns (Grimsby) and by 1971 the store was completely rebuilt with 100,000 square foot of floor area. As of June 2018 the store was House of Fraser Grimsby. It was originally earmarked for closure under initial CVA, but was later rescued after the Mike Ashley takeover, before closing in March 2020.
