= John Binns (cricketer) =

English cricketer

John Binns (31 March 1870 – 8 December 1934) was an English cricketer, who played one first-class match for Yorkshire in 1898.

== Biography ==
Born in Woodhouse Carr, Leeds, Yorkshire, England, Binns was a lower-order right-handed batsman and a wicket-keeper and was called up for the match against Leicestershire at Grace Road, Leicester, after the regular Yorkshire wicket-keeper, David Hunter, was injured in the previous match against Nottinghamshire at Headingley.

Binns made four runs in his only innings and stumped three Leicestershire batsmen. But Hunter's more regular deputy, Arthur Bairstow, was called in for the following game, and Binns did not play first-class cricket again.

He died in Leeds in December 1934.
