= Christopher Pratts =

British furniture store

Christopher Pratt's
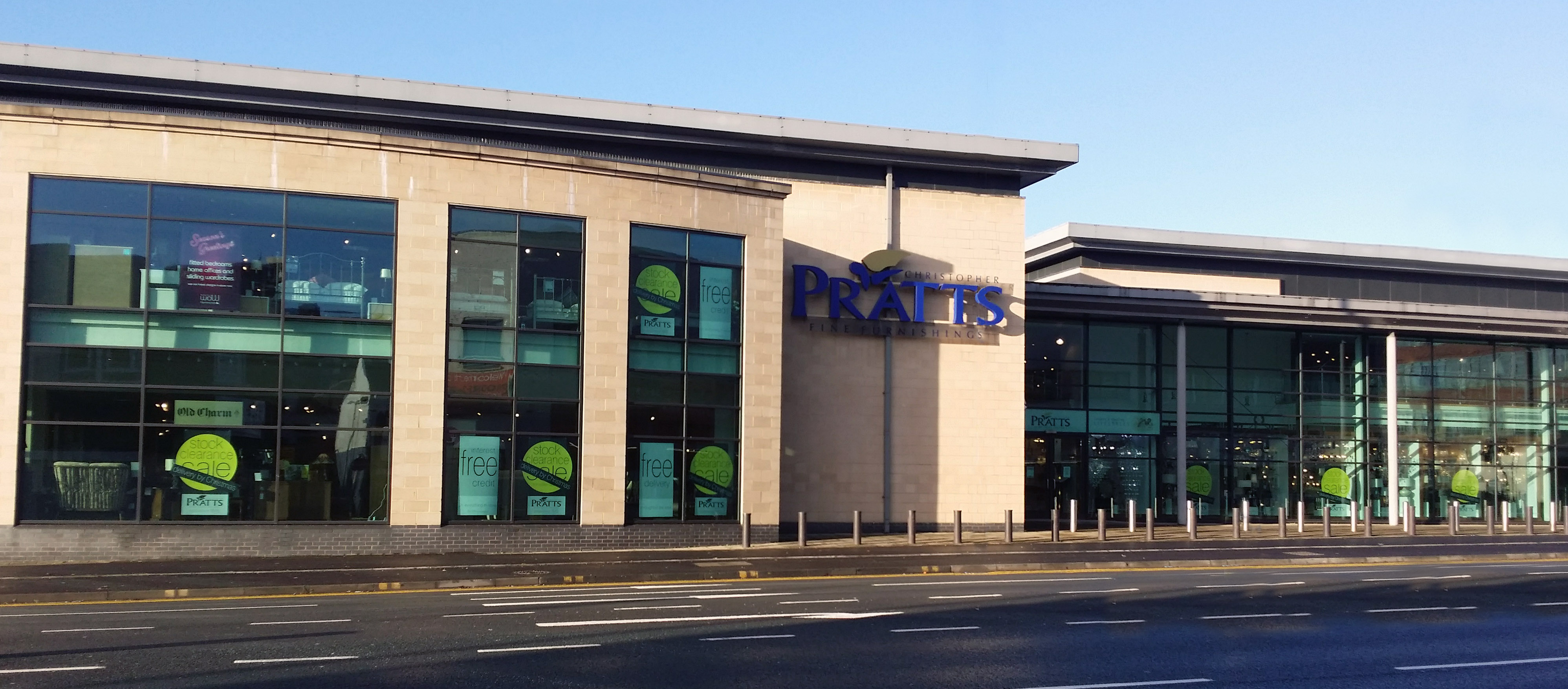
- Industry: Furniture Retail
- Founded: 1845
- Headquarters: Leeds, West Yorkshire, UK
- Products: Furniture
- Website: CPratts.co.uk

Christopher Pratts is a large furniture and home accessories retailer in Leeds, England. The business was established in Bradford in 1845. Since 2003, the store has been at its current location on Regent Street in Leeds. Christopher Pratts has become the largest purpose-built furniture store in the country. The company is family-owned and operated. It is well known for selling a wide range of quality furniture by leading brands such as G Plan, Duresta, Ercol and Stressless.

The shop is owned by Stokers Holdings.

== History ==
Christopher Pratt was 11 years old when his father died working in lead mines. One of 13 children, Christopher and his family left their cottage in Gunnerside, Swaledale and moved to Bradford, where he became an apprentice cabinet maker. After finishing his apprenticeship, Christopher Pratt set up his business in 1845, designing and making quality furniture for Bradford homes, businesses and buildings.

By 1900 the store had 14 departments and sold furniture from other craftsmen.

During the First World War, Christopher Pratts contributed to the war effort by producing and assembling aircraft parts.

Christopher Pratts became one of the first stores in the country to sell wirelesses and gramophones by 1925.

Christopher Pratts moved to its current site in Regent Street, Leeds in 2003, reportedly the largest purpose-built furniture store in the country.

== Awards ==
In 2004, Christopher Pratts was awarded Retailer of the Year by the Furniture Awards.
