= Just One of the Guys =

1985 film by Lisa Gottlieb

- Theatrical release poster
- Directed by: Lisa Gottlieb
- Screenplay by: Dennis Feldman; Jeff Franklin
- Story by: Dennis Feldman
- Produced by: Andrew Fogelson
- Starring: Joyce Hyser; Clayton Rohner; Billy Jacoby; Toni Hudson; William Zabka
- Cinematography: John McPherson
- Edited by: Lou Lombardo
- Music by: Tom Scott
- Production companies: Summa Entertainment Group; Triton
- Distributed by: Columbia Pictures
- Release date: April 26, 1985
- Running time: 100 minutes
- Country: United States
- Language: English
- Budget: < $5 million
- Box office: $11.5 million

Just One of the Guys is a 1985 American teen-comedy film directed by Lisa Gottlieb and co-written by Dennis Feldman and Jeff Franklin. It is a loose adaptation of William Shakespeare's Twelfth Night. The film stars Joyce Hyser, Clayton Rohner, Billy Jacoby, Toni Hudson, and William Zabka.

In 2015, the film was ranked number 48 on Entertainment Weekly's list of the "50 Best High School Movies".

== Plot ==
Terri Griffith is a high school student and aspiring journalist in Phoenix, Arizona, who feels that her teachers do not take her articles seriously because of her good looks. After failing to obtain her dream job as a newspaper intern, Terri concludes that it is because she is a girl.

Terri decides to remedy the situation while her parents are out of town on a two-week Caribbean vacation. She enrolls as a boy named "Terry" at a rival high school, her real identity known only to her sex-obsessed younger brother, Buddy, and her best friend, Denise. On her first day, Terri meets Rick Morehouse, a socially awkward transfer student whom she finds attractive. Trying to stay close to Rick, Terri helps him through an image makeover and encourages him to start talking to girls.

After many episodes in and out of school, including fending off a group of bullies led by bodybuilder Greg Tolan, dealing with her real college boyfriend Kevin, and being set up on a blind date with a potential new girlfriend named Sandy, Terri manages to be accepted as "one of the guys".

At the senior prom, a jealous Greg picks a fight with Rick, who ultimately trounces the bully in front of the entire class. When Terri's boyfriend shows up unexpectedly and discovers the ruse, Rick assumes that Terri's big secret is that "Terry" is gay. To prove otherwise, Terri opens her shirt and reveals her breasts to Rick. Although she admits to loving Rick, he rejects Terri, prompting a desperate Terri to kiss him in front of everyone. To placate the awestruck students, Rick derisively announces that Terri "has tits" before leaving the prom and Terri behind.

Heartbroken and humiliated, Terri retreats to her room and writes a lengthy article on what it is like to be a girl in boys' clothing, detailing all of her positive and negative experiences. Terri then returns to her school. When her article is printed in the newspaper, Terri receives high praise and finally earns her dream job there. Nevertheless, Terri still yearns for Rick, who has not spoken to her since the prom.

One day during the summer, Rick suddenly turns up after reading her article. Realizing their true feelings for each other, they reconcile and plan another date. They decide to go for a drive in Terri's car, but before Buddy can join them, an attractive blonde on a motorcycle rides up and beckons to him with a smile. Buddy then climbs onto the back of her motorcycle, and both couples happily part ways.

== Cast ==
- Joyce Hyser as Terri/Terry Griffith
- Clayton Rohner as Rick Morehouse
- Billy Jacoby as Buddy Griffith
- William Zabka as Greg Tolan
- Toni Hudson as Denise
- Leigh McCloskey as Kevin
- Sherilyn Fenn as Sandy
- Deborah Goodrich as Deborah
- Kenneth Tigar as Mr. Raymaker
- Arye Gross as Willie
- Stuart Charno as Reptile

== Production ==
Prior to directing the film, director Lisa Gottlieb's only other directing credit was a short film titled Murder in the Mist. She was offered the job partly due to an ongoing class action lawsuit filed by the Directors Guild of America against Columbia Pictures for having never produced a feature film directed by a woman.

Principal photography began on October 22, 1984, in Phoenix, Arizona, under the working title I Was a Teenage Boy. The original script was titled Ladies Man. Phoenix was chosen as the location of the film due to the lack of available high schools for filming in Los Angeles. Scenes set at the two schools were filmed at Coronado High School and Scottsdale High School. James Brown briefly worked on the film as a dance choreographer, his work is uncredited but he received a special thanks in the end credits.

According to Lisa Gottlieb, Terry's look while disguised as a boy was intentionally designed to resemble Ralph Macchio in The Karate Kid. She co-wrote six drafts of the screenplay with her writing partner Mitch Giannunzio, but they were denied writing credit by the producers. Gottlieb's additions to the script included scenes of Terry objecting to discrimination and the scene where Terry reveals her true identity to her crush by exposing her breasts. Actress Joyce Hyser originally did not want to do this scene but changed her mind after a conversation with Rosanna Arquette. Producers attempted to have Sherilyn Fenn expose her breasts as well during the bedroom seduction scene. Gottlieb shot the idea down, but producers suggested it to Fenn anyway, causing her to get upset and cry. The idea was immediately scrapped.

== Soundtrack ==
Just One of the Guys

Soundtrack album by various artists
- Released: 1985
- Genres: Rock, pop, R&B
- Label: Elektra

Professional ratings
Review scores
Source	Rating
Allmusic	3/5 stars

1. "Just One of the Guys" by Shalamar – 3:55
2. "Girls Got Something Boys Ain't Got" by Midnight Star – 3:56
3. "Tonight You're Mine, Baby" by Ronnie Spector – 4:57
4. "Prove It to You" by Dwight Twilley – 3:20
5. "Jealous" by Berlin – 4:23
6. "Way Down" by Billy Burnette – 3:34
7. "Burning" by Brock/Davis – 4:20
8. "Thrills" by Greg French – 3:15
9. "Hard Way" by Brock/Davis – 4:48
10. "Guy Talk" by Tom Scott – 2:29

The songs and music that were played in the film, not on the soundtrack.

1. "Trouble" by Lindsey Buckingham
2. "Down on the Street" by the Stooges
3. "Turn Out Right" by Private Domain
4. "Comb My Hair" by Johnny Lyon
5. "Buns" by Bonedaddys
6. "Gone Too Far" by Neurotica

== Release ==
Just One of the Guys was released on April 26, 1985, opening in about 1,500 theaters. Although the film was only a modest success initially, it was in heavy rotation on HBO and Comedy Central for years, especially after Sherilyn Fenn gained stardom on Twin Peaks in 1990. According to Joyce Hyser, HBO executive producer Michael J. Fuchs remarked that the film was at one time the most requested film on HBO.

=== Home media ===
The film was released on Blu-ray Disc under Sony Pictures on April 28, 2020. Special features include filmmaker and cast commentary and theatrical trailer.

== Reception ==
On the review aggregator website Rotten Tomatoes, 57% of 14 critics' reviews are positive, with an average rating of 4.8/10. Metacritic, which uses a weighted average, assigned the film a score of 57 out of 100 based on 6 critics, indicating "mixed or average" reviews.

The film developed a cult following in later years, largely thanks to it airing frequently on TV. On the 35th anniversary of the film's release director Lisa Gottlieb remarked “This was a couple of decades after the movie came out, but I was doing a live chat with Jezebel.com. They were doing a series on the film, which they had chosen as one of their favorite female-directed movies... That was when I learned that the movie had been a very important film for trans men and trans women. They’d seen it as kids and said, ‘That’s me. That’s exactly it. I get it.’ It’s a very heterosexual film, that’s how I wrote it, but this is what people saw in it. That’s an honor and, for me, another really interesting aspect of making the film.“

== See also ==
- She's the Man, 2006 teen comedy with a similar premise.
- Cross-dressing in film and television
- Anything for Love
