= Claudine's Return =

1998 film

- Directed by: Antonio Tibaldi
- Written by: Heidi Hall; Antonio Tibaldi
- Produced by: Patricia Foulkrod; Tami Lynn; Amedeo Ursini
- Starring: Christina Applegate
- Music by: Michel Colombier
- Distributed by: Jazz Pictures Inc; Miramax Home Entertainment; Showcase Entertainment, Inc; Buena Vista Home Entertainment (DVD)
- Release date: April 17, 1998
- Running time: 90 minutes
- Country: United States
- Language: English
- Budget: $2,000,000

Claudine's Return is a 1998 American drama film starring Christina Applegate.

== Production ==
The film had a budget of $2 million and was announced on June 17, 1997, being shot shortly afterwards. It was filmed almost entirely on the American island of Tybee Island, Georgia with a few shots from the surrounding areas. It was Christina Applegate's first role after her long-running Fox sitcom Married... with Children ended in June 1997.

== Release ==
The film premiered at the Los Angeles Independent Film Festival in April 1998.

The film's rights were acquired by Miramax, an indie-focused subsidiary of The Walt Disney Company. It was released as Kiss of Fire on VHS and DVD by Disney's Buena Vista Home Entertainment (under the Miramax Home Entertainment banner). In the Czech Republic, it was released under the title Nástrahy lásky (meaning Pitfalls of Love), while in Finland it was released under the title Menneisyyden kahle (meaning The Shackles of the Past). The film's Australian DVD release was licensed out to Warner Vision Australia, who issued it in that country in late 2003.

In 2010, Disney sold off Miramax, which they had owned since 1993, with Qatari company beIN Media Group subsequently taking the studio over. In April 2020, ViacomCBS (now known as Paramount Skydance) bought a 49% stake in the studio from beIN, with this deal giving Paramount the rights to Miramax's film library, including Claudine's Return, which has been distributed digitally by Paramount Pictures since April 2020. The film was made available on Amazon Prime and other digital platforms.
