= You've Come This Way Before =

Studio album by Nancy Priddy
- Released: 1968
- Genre: Psychedelic folk, acid folk
- Length: 30:39
- Label: Dot
- Producer: Phil Ramone

You've Come This Way Before is a 1968 album by American singer-songwriter Nancy Priddy. The album was produced by Phil Ramone.

== Release ==
The album was originally released by Dot Records in 1968, and reissued on CD in 2005 by Rev-Ola Records.

== Style ==
Plan B's Alistair Fitchett said the album had a "definite folk edge" mixed with "orchestrated pop" and "a sweet soulful country edge". He also called it "beautifully psychedelic" in a way reminiscent of Buffalo Springfield, also noting that the title track is about Buffalo Springfield cofounder Stephen Stills. AllMusic's Jason Ankeny called it a "minor classic of psychedelic folk". The album has also been called acid folk. Richie Unterberger called the album "the kind of idiosyncratically weird effort that could have only been made in the late '60s", with "trippy", "Through the Looking-Glass-like dreamy jottings" for lyrics.

== Reception ==
Professional ratings
Review scores
Source	Rating
AllMusic	3.5/5 stars

Fitchett called the album a "gem that demands your attention." Unterberger, on the other hand, felt Priddy and her team "couldn't quite decide whether they were aiming for the pop market or the freaks", ending up with an album that could sometimes be "haunting and enticing" but mostly "doesn't cohere, the songwriting not being quite up to the apparent far-out ambitions of the project."

In his book Music: Over 100 Top 10 Lists, critic Barney Harsent called "Christina's World" his sixth-favorite song inspired by art, with its inspiration coming from the painting of the same name by Andrew Wyeth. Harsent called the song "beautiful" and the album "sublime". A writer for Cash Box said the title track "displays a strong set of lyrics, well read by the lark and a vocal chorus."

== Track listing ==
All tracks written by Nancy Priddy, with additional writers noted in parentheses.

1. "You've Come This Way Before" – 2:52 (Everett Gordon)
2. "Ebony Glass" – 2:21 (Bobby Whiteside)
3. "Mystic Lady" – 6:32 (John Simon)
4. "Christina's World" – 2:45 (Gordon)
5. "We Could Have It All" – 2:41 (Manny Albam)
6. "My Friend Frank" – 3:03 (Albam)
7. "O' Little Child" – 3:17 (Albam)
8. "And Who Will You Be Then" – 3:13 (Gordon)
9. "On the Other Side of the River" – 2:34 (Albam)
10. "Epitaph" – 1:21 (Simon)

== Personnel ==
- Nancy Priddy – vocals, liner notes
- Phil Ramone – producer
- Manny Albam – arranger, conductor
- John Simon – arranger, conductor
- Everett Gordon – arranger, conductor ("Christina's World")
- Don Peterson – cover photography
- Christopher Whorf – art direction
