= Tony Binns =

New Zealand geographer

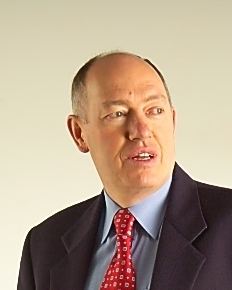
Binns in 2007

James Anthony (Tony) Binns (born 1948 in Greater Manchester) is an Emeritus Ron Lister Professor of Geography at the University of Otago in New Zealand.

== Background ==
Tony Binns was born in Prestwich and grew up in Bury, Greater Manchester, UK. He attended Stand Grammar School, Whitefield. He graduated from Sheffield University (Geography, 1970; Dip.Ed., 1971) and taught geography in schools while attending the University of Birmingham (MA African Studies 1973; PhD African Studies and Geography, 1981). He taught geography at University of Sussex from 1975 to 2004, before moving to the University of Otago as Professor and latterly Head of Department.

Binns has two children, and holds British and New Zealand citizenship.

== Scholarly contributions ==
Binns' prime interest is African community development and the livelihoods and wellbeing of Africans. His early work was in Sierra Leone, working from Kayima in the north east of the country on links between diamond mining and the farming sector, the two main occupations of local residents. He has continued to follow these trends since 1974, and in 2014 he was elected an honorary chief of Kayima for his continued support to the community.

Since then he has worked in

- South Africa (local economic development initiatives, community-based institutions and empowerment in South Africa, exporting ‘alternative’ foods and fair trade, livelihoods of the West Coast region including wildflower harvesting, and the ‘Working for Water’ programme)
- Sierra Leone (agricultural development and change in the Eastern Province; reconstruction and development in the post-conflict period; integrated rural development; urban and peri-urban farming in Freetown)
- Nigeria (urban and peri-urban agricultural production in Kano, pressures facing pastoral livelihoods in northern Nigeria, pastoral-farmer conflict, and degradation in the Kano close-settled zone)
- Morocco (small-scale irrigation development in the High Atlas mountains)
- The Gambia (export-orientated horticultural production)
- Zambia (urban and peri-urban agricultural production in Lusaka, urban agriculture in the Zambian Copper Belt)
- Kenya (relationships between farming and fishing in the Kenyan sector of Lake Victoria).

He has also worked in

- Samoa (the role of the church in development)
- Vietnam (urban and peri-urban agricultural production in Hanoi)
- and New Zealand.

== Recognition ==
- President of the Geographical Association 1994–1995
- Leverhulme Study Abroad Fellowship 2000–2001 (at Rhodes University), South Africa
- Director and Council member of Worldaware (UK-based development education organisation) 1995–2004
- President of the Commonwealth Geographical Bureau (2009–2016).
- President of the New Zealand Geographical Society (2010–2011).
- Distinguished New Zealand Geographer Medal 2012.
- Chief Manjawah of Sandor (master farmer), and Sahr Kayima (first son of Kayima), Sierra Leone, 2014

== Key publications ==
- Binns J.A., K. Lynch and E. Nel (eds.) 2018. The Routledge Handbook of African Development. London: Routledge
- Potter, R. Binns J.A., J.A. Elliott, E. Nel, D.W. Smith . 2017. Geographies of Development: An Introduction to Development Studies. Routledge. 4th Edition.
- Binns, T., A. Dixon and E. Nel. 2012. Africa: Diversity and Development. London: Routledge.
- Leimgruber W., E.Nel, Y. Matsuo, T. Binns, R. Chand, B. Cullen, D. Lynch, and P.K. Pradhan (eds.) 2010. Geographical marginality as a global issue. International Geographical Union 5 volumes. ISBN 978-0-473-17042-4.
- Potter R.B., T. Binns, J. Elliott and D. Smith. 2008. Geographies of development: an Introduction to Development Studies. Third Edition. London: Pearson. ISBN 978-0-13-222823-7.
- Binns T., A. Dixon and G. Spellman. 2007. Sustainable Development. Oxford: Philip Allan Publishers. ISBN 978-1-84489-301-0
- Binns T. (ed) 1995. People and Environment in Africa. Chichester: John Wiley. ISBN 0-471-95530-2.
- Potter R.B., T. Binns, J. Elliott and D. Smith. 2004. Geographies of development. London: Prentice Hall, Pearson. ISBN 0-130-60569-7
- Bowden R. and T. Binns 2001. The changing face of South Africa. London: Hodder Wayland. ISBN 0-7502-3498-9.
- Lester, E. Nel and T. Binns. 2000. South Africa, past, present and future: gold at the end of the rainbow?. London: Longman.
- Binns T., D. Clark and H. Matthews. 2000. Regional development and change. Oxford: Philip Allan Publishers. ISBN 0-86003-245-0.
- Fisher C. and T. Binns (eds.) 2000. Issues in geography teaching. London: Routledge. ISBN 0-415-23077-2.
- Potter R.B., T. Binns, J. Elliott and D. Smith. 1999. Geographies of Development. London: Longman. ISBN 0-582-29825-3.
- Clark D., H. Matthews and T. Binns. 1998. Urban Development and Change. Oxford: Philip Allan Publishers. ISBN 0-86003-208-6.
- Bowden R. and T. Binns. 1998. Journey through Africa. Oxford: Horus Editions. ISBN 1-899762-31-0
- Binns T. and R. Bowden. 1998. West Africa. World Fact Files, London: MacDonald Young Books. ISBN 0-7500-2433-X
- Bowden R. and T. Binns. 1998. East Africa World Fact Files. London: MacDonald Young Books. ISBN 0-7500-2435-6.
- Binns T. 1994. Tropical Africa. London: Routledge. ISBN 0-415-04801-X.
- Binns M. and T. Binns. 1992. Sierra Leone. World Bibliographical Series. Oxford: Clio Press . ISBN 1-85109-101-7.
- Bailey P. and T. Binns (eds) 1987. A Case for Geography. Sheffield: The Geographical Association. ISBN 0-948512-07-5.
