= Binns (department store) =

Former department store chain

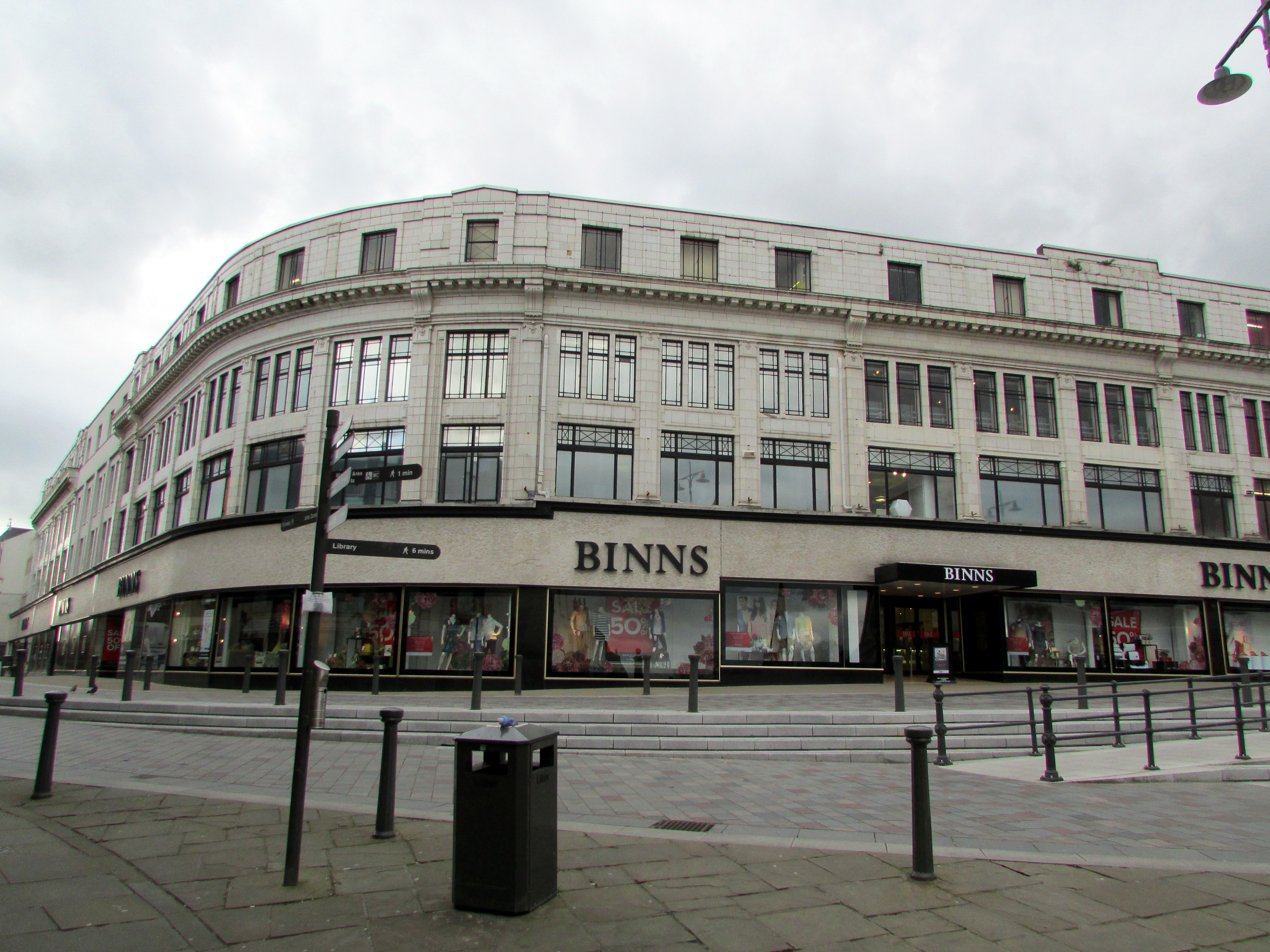
Binns in Darlington, 2014.

H. Binns, Son & Co. was a chain of department stores based in Sunderland, later purchased and absorbed by House of Fraser.

== Early history ==
George Binns moved to Sunderland from Yorkshire in 1804, establishing a small drapery business in 1807 before taking over a larger wool and linen drapery store owned by Thomas Ellerby. Binns was assisted by his son Henry in the store at 176 High Street, Bishopwearmouth, Sunderland. In 1836 Henry inherited the store on the death of his father and began trading under the name Henry Binns. He was a member of the anti-slavery movement and sold only cotton grown by free labour. By 1844 the shop had moved from 176 to 173 High Street.

In 1865 Henry retired and his son Joseph John Binns took control of the business changing its name to H. Binns, Son & Co. By 1884 the business had moved again, renting two houses at 38-39 Fawcett Street where the house frontages were replaced with a new shop front and the interior remodelled.

During 1897 the business was incorporated as H. Binns, Son & Co. Ltd. and the buildings at 38-39 Fawcett Street were purchased shortly afterwards. The company was chaired by Joseph Binns and employed thirty staff.

== History as a limited company ==
The business grew quickly and within seventeen years became Sunderland's biggest department store. It had acquired or leased 32 to 37, 40 and 42 Fawcett Street and was trading on both sides of the street. The capital of the business at the start of the First World War stood at £65,000 (approx. £20 million 2013).

In 1922, the company expanded with the purchase of Arthur Sanders Ltd., a drapery business based in High Row, Darlington. It was renamed Binns and developed to become a department store. This was followed in 1923 by the purchase of Thomas Jones of Middlesbrough, which was again remodelled and renamed Binns. By 1924 every tram in Sunderland had the advertisement Shop at Binns on its front. In 1925 the Darlington store was destroyed by fire but was swiftly rebuilt and re-opened the following year.

The company continued to expand by acquisition of stores in other towns:

- 1926 - Gray Peverell & Co. (West Hartlepool)
- 1927 - Fowler & Brock (South Shields)
- 1929 - James Coxon & Co. (Newcastle upon Tyne)
- 1933 - Robinson Brothers (Carlisle and Dumfries)
- 1934 - Robert Maule & Son (Edinburgh)

The stores were all remodelled and renamed Binns. In addition to purchasing companies, further property was purchased from W. J. Reed in Fawcett Street, Sunderland and new premises were built on Borough Road. In 1934 the company changed its name to simply Binns Ltd., and in 1935 reported capital of over £1 million and a staff of 5,000.

World War II proved difficult for Binns as a number of stores were damaged in air raids: Dumfries in March 1941, most of the Fawcett Street store a few weeks later, plus a disastrous fire at the Middlesbrough store occurred in March 1942. Construction of a replacement store in Sunderland began in November 1949 but it took until 1953 for the store to be re-opened.

In early 1953, House of Fraser made an approach to purchase Binns Ltd., which initially met with opposition from the board of directors. After a bitter takeover process, however, Hugh Fraser was appointed Chairman of the company in April 1953.

== House of Fraser ==
After the takeover, Binns continued to operate as a separate business within the House of Fraser empire.

The Middlesbrough store was reopened in 1957 and rebuilding at Sunderland culminated in the opening of an additional new building in 1962.

Expansion of the Binns group was resumed in 1969 with the purchase of Guy & Smith, the leading department store in Grimsby. The store was refurbished and renamed Binns. Further acquisitions into the 1970s strengthened the group's presence in the east of England. These included the old-established and well-regarded department store of Hammonds of Hull in 1972. A new Binns store opened at Scunthorpe in 1974.

During the 1970s, House of Fraser re-organised its department stores into a number of regional trading divisions of which Binns became one, with management remaining at Sunderland. An enlarged Binns group had emerged by the end of the decade with the addition of a number of stores in the north of England which had been taken over by House of Fraser through various acquisitions since the Second World War. Edward J Clarke in Harrogate (House of Fraser's first store in England), Alexanders in Southport and R. H. O. Hills in Blackpool joined Binns from this reorganisation. In 1975 William Henderson & Sons of Liverpool was transferred from the Harrods division to Binns. Further stores were added in Doncaster (formerly an Owen Owen store) and Lincoln (formerly Mawer & Collingham).

The decline of heavy industry and subsequent challenges in the economy of the north-east of England during the 1980s were reflected in the fortunes of parts of the Binns business.

The large Sunderland store, straddling both sides of Fawcett Street, was contracted to a single building and many departments were closed.

Branches further south, however, continued to trade relatively strongly. The stores in Hull, Darlington and Grimsby were refurbished between 1984 and 1986.

The 1990s heralded a period of review and rationalisation across the House of Fraser business. Binns saw many of its branches close during the decade. The Sunderland store closed entirely in 1993.

House of Fraser was acquired by Highland Group Holdings, a consortium of investors, in 2006. After the takeover all of the remaining Binns stores, save for the Darlington branch, were renamed House of Fraser.

Following a 20 year period as the only Binns branded store, the Darlington branch closed on Sunday 8th March 2026.
