= Eric Binns =

English footballer

Personal information
- Full name: Eric Binns
- Date of birth: 13 August 1924
- Place of birth: Halifax, England
- Date of death: 20 September 2007 (aged 83)
- Place of death: Burnley, England
- Height: 6 ft 0 in (1.83 m)
- Position: Defender

Youth career
- Huddersfield Town

Senior career*
Years	Team	Apps	(Gls)
1946–1947	Halifax Town	6	(1)
1947–1949	Goole Town	?	(?)
1949–1955	Burnley	15	(0)
1955–1957	Blackburn Rovers	23	(0)
1957–1958	Runcorn	?	(?)
- * Club domestic league appearances and goals

Eric Binns (13 August 1924 – 20 September 2007) was an English professional footballer who played as a defender. During his career he played for Halifax Town, Burnley and Blackburn Rovers in the Football League and also had spells in non-league football.

== Career ==
Born in Halifax, West Yorkshire, Binns started his footballing career as an amateur with Huddersfield Town before joining his home-town club Halifax Town in May 1946. He scored one goal in six league matches for the club but was released at the end of the 1946–47 campaign. Binns subsequently moved into non-league football with Goole Town but returned to the professional game two years later after being offered a contract by Football League First Division side Burnley following a successful trial period. He spent the first three years of his Burnley career playing solely in the club's reserve team, unable to displace first-team centre-half Tommy Cummings from his position.

Binns eventually made his first-team debut for the Lancashire club on 15 November 1952, deputising for the injured Jock Aird at right-back in the 1–0 home win over Aston Villa. He played twice more during the 1952–53 campaign, but remained primarily a reserve player during the remainder of his time with the club, appearing only when either Cummings or Aird were unavailable. In total, Binns played 15 matches in the Football League for Burnley in six seasons before transferring to local rivals Blackburn Rovers in May 1955. He spent two years with the Ewood Park club, playing 23 league matches during that time. Binns moved into non-league football with Runcorn in 1957 before retiring from the sport the following year.

After his retirement from football, Binns worked as a salesman and in 1977 he was appointed as the steward of Burnley Cricket Club.
