= List of schools in Bury =

This is a list of schools in the Metropolitan Borough of Bury in the English county of Greater Manchester.

== State-funded schools ==
=== Primary schools ===
- All Saints' CE Primary School, Whitefield
- Bury and Whitefield Jewish Primary School, Unsworth
- Butterstile Primary School, Prestwich
- Cams Lane Primary School, Radcliffe
- Chantlers Primary School, Bury
- Chapelfield Primary School, Radcliffe
- Chesham Primary School, Bury
- Christ Church Ainsworth CE Primary School, Ainsworth
- Christ Church CE Primary School, Walshaw
- East Ward Community Primary School, Bury
- Elton Community Primary School, Bury
- Emmanuel Holcombe CE Primary School, Holcombe
- Fairfield Community Primary School, Bury
- Gorsefield Primary School, Radcliffe
- Greenhill Primary School, Bury
- Greenmount Primary School, Greenmount
- Guardian Angels RC Primary School, Elton
- Hazlehurst Community Primary School, Ramsbottom
- Heaton Park Primary School, Whitefield
- Higher Lane Primary School, Whitefield
- Holcombe Brook Primary School, Holcombe Brook
- Hollins Grundy Primary School, Hollins
- Holly Mount RC Primary School, Greenmount
- Holy Trinity Primary School, Bury
- Lowercroft Primary School, Bury
- Mersey Drive Community Primary School, Whitefield
- Old Hall Primary School, Brandlesholme
- Our Lady of Grace RC Primary School, Prestwich
- Our Lady of Lourdes RC Primary School, Bury
- Park View Primary School, Prestwich
- Peel Brow School, Ramsbottom
- Radcliffe Hall CE Primary School, Radcliffe
- Radcliffe Primary School, Radcliffe
- Ribble Drive Community Primary School, Whitefield
- St Andrew's CE Primary School, Radcliffe
- St Andrew's CE Primary School, Ramsbottom
- St Bernadette’s RC Primary School, Whitefield
- St Hilda's CE Primary School, Prestwich
- St John with St Mark CE Primary School, Bury
- St John's CE Primary School, Radcliffe
- St Joseph and St Bede RC Primary School, Bury
- St Joseph's RC Primary School, Ramsbottom
- St Luke CE Primary School, Bury
- St Margaret's CE Primary School, Prestwich
- St Marie's RC Primary School, Bury
- St Mary's CE Primary School, Hawkshaw
- St Mary's CE Primary School, Prestwich
- St Mary's RC Primary School, Radcliffe
- St Michael's RC Primary School, Whitefield
- St Paul's CE Primary School, Bury
- St Peter's CE Primary School, Bury
- St Stephen's CE Primary School, Bury
- St Thomas's CE Primary School, Bury
- Sedgley Park Community Primary School, Prestwich
- Springside Primary School, Bury
- Summerseat Methodist Primary School, Summerseat
- Sunny Bank Primary School, Bury
- Tottington Primary School, Tottington
- Unsworth Primary School, Unsworth
- Wesley Methodist Primary School, Radcliffe
- Whitefield Community Primary School, Whitefield
- Woodbank Primary School, Bury
- Yesoiday Hatorah Boys Academy, Prestwich
- Yesoiday Hatorah Girls Academy, Prestwich

=== Secondary schools ===
- Bury CE High School, Bury
- Derby High School, Bury
- Elton High School, Bury
- Hazel Wood High School, Bury
- The Heys School, Prestwich
- Manchester Mesivta School, Prestwich
- Parrenthorn High School, Prestwich
- Philips High School, Whitefield
- St Gabriel's RC High School, Bury
- St Monica's High School, Prestwich
- Tottington High School, Tottington
- Unsworth Academy, Unsworth
- Woodhey High School, Ramsbottom

=== Special and alternative schools ===
- Bury Secondary PRU Spring Lane School, Radcliffe
- Cloughside College, Prestwich
- Elms Bank, Whitefield
- Millwood Primary Special School, Radcliffe

=== Further education ===
- Bury College, Bury
- Holy Cross College, Bury

== Independent schools ==
=== Primary and preparatory schools ===
- Prestwich Preparatory School, Prestwich

=== Senior and all-through schools ===
- Bury Grammar School (Boys), Bury
- Bury Grammar School (Girls), Bury
- Darul Uloom Al-Arabiyyah Al-Islamiyyah, Holcombe

=== Special and alternative schools ===
- Cambian Chesham House School, Bury
- Craig Ormerod Associates, Radcliffe
- Excel and Exceed Centre, Bury
- Mill School, Bury
- Pennine House School, Bury
- Woodlands, Edenfield
