= Church Inn =

Listed pub in Prestwich, Greater Manchester, England

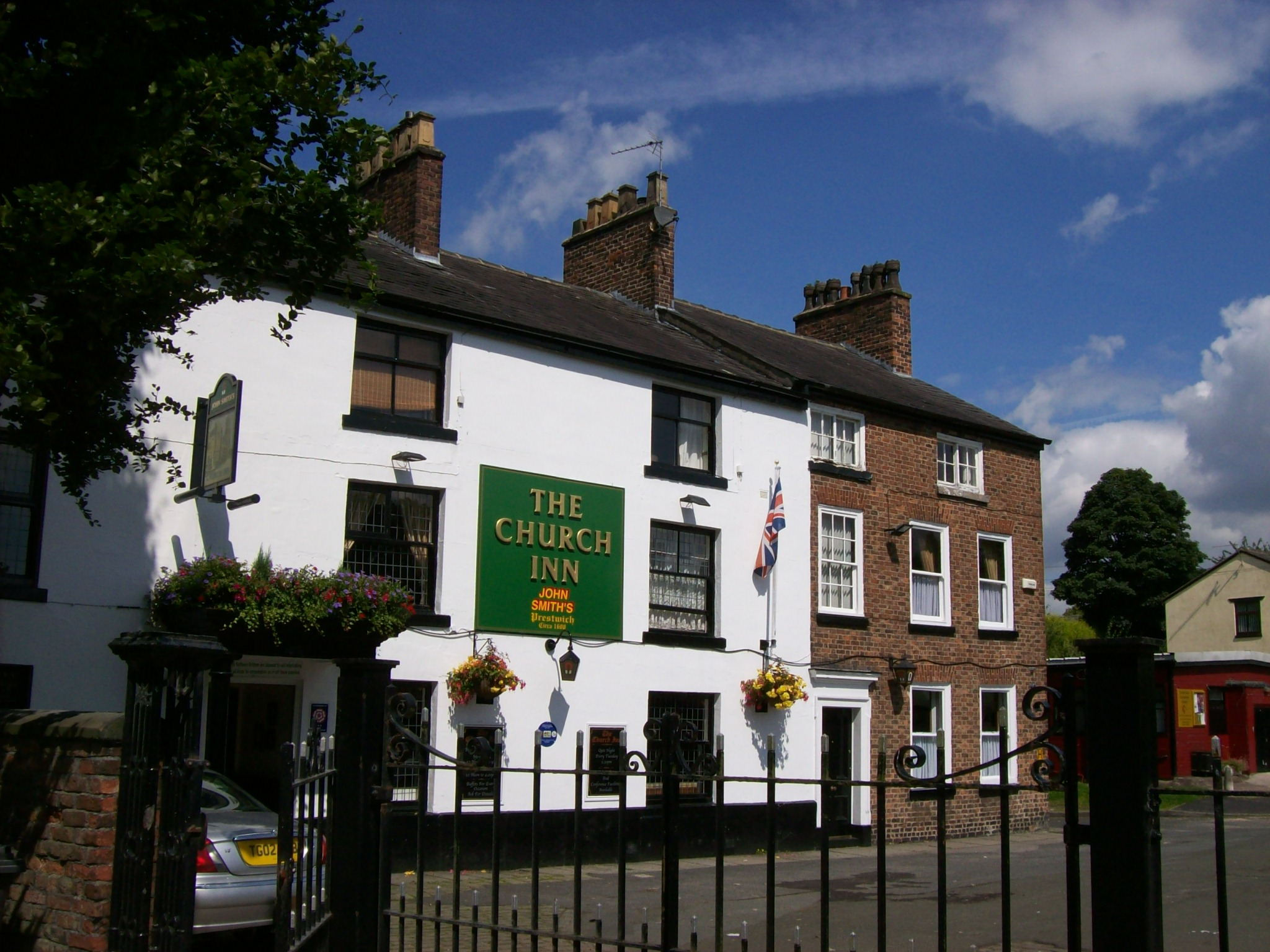
- The pub in 2012

- Location within Greater Manchester
- Former names: The Ostrich

General information
- Type: Public house
- Location: 40 Church Lane, Prestwich, Greater Manchester, England
- Coordinates: 53.5298°N 2.2862°W
- Year built: 18th century

Design and construction
- Designations

Listed Building – Grade II
- Official name: Church Inn
- Designated: 30 June 1966
- Reference no.: 1067251

The Church Inn is a Grade II listed public house on Church Lane in Prestwich, a town within the Metropolitan Borough of Bury, Greater Manchester, England. Historic England describes it as an 18th‑century building, while the Campaign for Real Ale (CAMRA) notes earlier origins and gives 1629 as the earliest known date.

== History ==
Although the official listing dates the building to the 18th century, The Campaign for Real Ale (CAMRA) records an earlier origin and cites 1629 as the earliest known date. A local history feature also repeats traditions of 17th‑century or earlier activity on the site, but these accounts are anecdotal and not supported by the listing. The pub was known as the Ostrich until 1823. The 1893 Ordnance Survey map marks the building as the Church Inn.

On 30 June 1966, the Church Inn was designated a Grade II listed building. As of 2025, the pub's freehold was held by Stonegate. It stands in close proximity to the Church of St Mary the Virgin, which is Grade I listed.

== Architecture ==
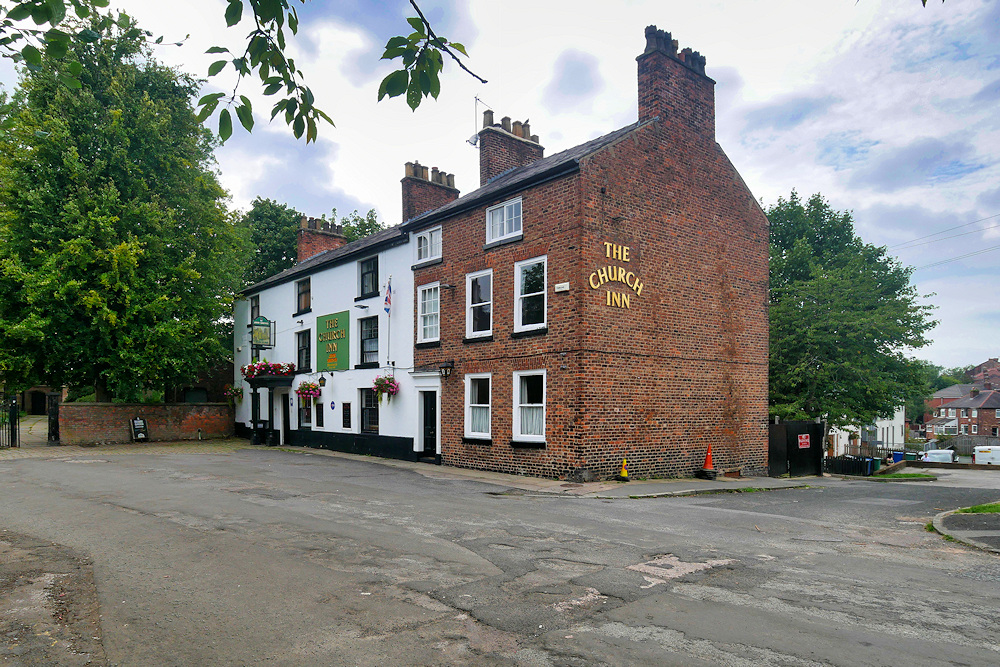
No. 38 Church Lane, showing the pub sign on its side elevation

The building is constructed in brown brick, with the front finished in render marked to resemble stone. The main elevation has three wide windows fitted with sash frames in a style typical of the Victorian period. Inside, the structure includes rounded‑edge ceiling beams and traditional six‑panel doors. The pub adjoins No. 38 Church Lane, which is separately Grade II-listed and built in exposed brick rather than render, and the side elevation carries signage for the pub.

== See also ==
- Listed buildings in Prestwich
- Listed pubs in Greater Manchester
