= William Peake (disambiguation) =

William Peake may refer to:

- William Peake (c. 1580–1639), English painter and printseller
- Billy Peake (1888–1960), English footballer

== See also ==
- Billy Peek (born 1940), American musician
