= Heaton Park Congregational Church =

Church in Prestwich, Greater Manchester, England

Coordinates: 53°31′53″N 2°16′08″W

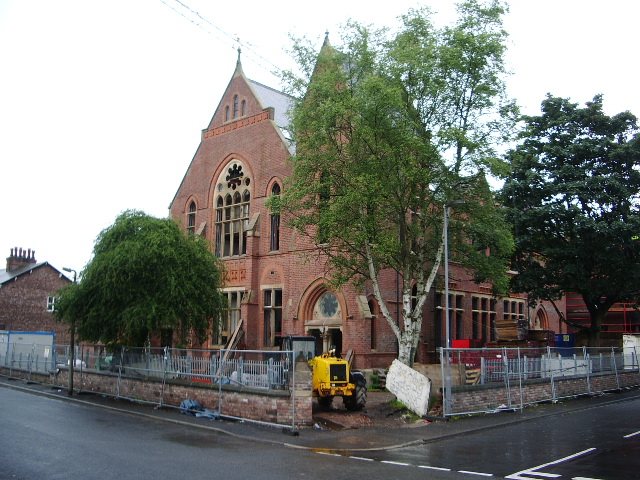

Heaton Park Congregational Church is a former church in Prestwich in Greater Manchester. It has been listed Grade II on the National Heritage List for England (NHLE) since April 1986.

It was designed by Alfred Waterhouse in the Gothic Revival style and completed in 1881. Built of red brick with stone dressings it has steep slate roofs. The NHLE listing describes the church as a "good and complete example of the work of Waterhouse, economically planned and sensitively detailed". Original staircases, doors and interior fittings intact. Unusually the ground floor is occupied by a school room with the church on the first floor. It is believed to be the only church in the United Kingdom designed in this manner.

The church was converted into a residential building in 2006. 23 one and two bedroom apartments were formed in the main church building, the congregation moved to a purpose built church building nearby that had an additional three apartments. The congregation decided to convert the building due to a dwindling attendance for worship and increasing vandalism that was expensive to repair. The architect Zoran Baros of FuZED Architecture and Design initially approached the church in 2000 and the works were eventually completed in 2006.
