= Prestwich Cricket, Tennis & Bowling Club =

Sports club in Prestwich, England

Coordinates: 53.532°N 2.278°W

- Company type: Multisports club
- Founded: 1840
- Headquarters: The Heys, Heys Road, Prestwich. M25 1BZ, Bury Greater Manchester, United Kingdom
- Website: www.prestwichsport.com

Prestwich Cricket, Tennis & Bowling Club, commonly known as PCTBC or Prestwich Cricket Club, is an English multi-sports club from the town of Prestwich, in the Metropolitan Borough of Bury, England.

With over 500 members, the club has four official sporting sections fielding amateur teams in cricket, tennis, crown green bowling and association football. Boasting a large social membership section, the club also has teams playing a variety of other sports including cribbage, darts, dominoes, five-a-side football and netball.

The club was the first multi-sports club in the UK to achieve Clubmark or equivalent accreditation's in all its official sporting sections. Then in 2010, the club underwent a major redevelopment which included the addition of a new changing facility, the refurbishment of the existing clubhouse and new floodlit tennis courts. As a result, PCTBC was then chosen as the showcase club for the inaugural NatWest ECB CricketForce Fundraiser weekend.

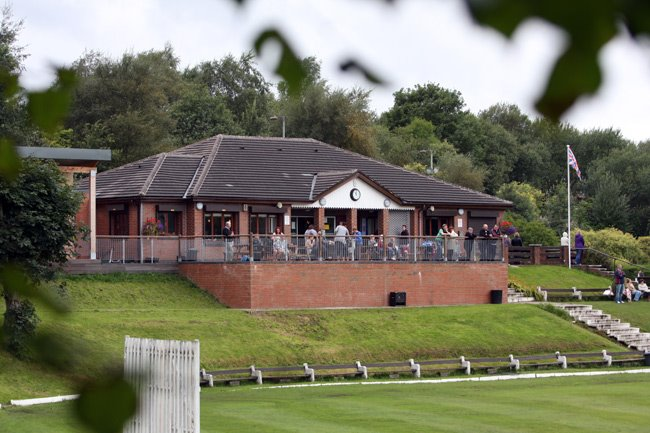
PCTBC Clubhouse August 2011

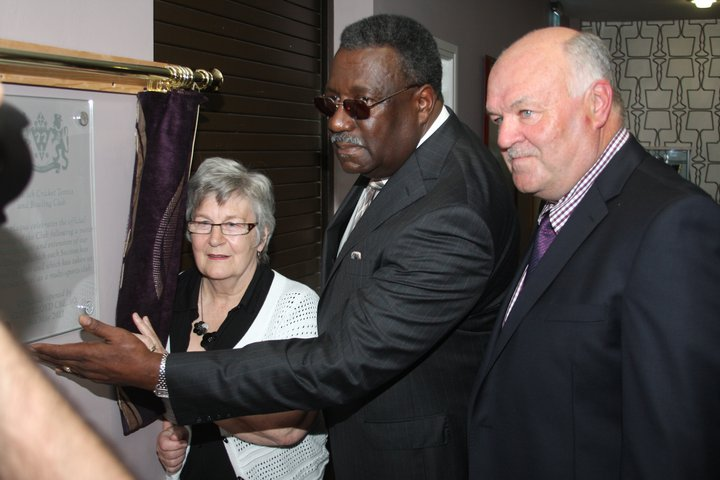
Clive Lloyd (centre) re-opens the clubhouse flanked by President Mrs Anne Orrell and Chairman Mr Brian Lorenzini. May 2011

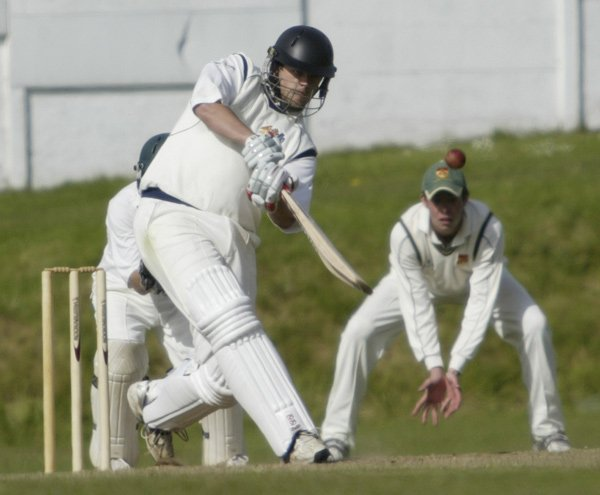
Prestwich Cricket Club Professional Daniel Jones batting against Chorley CC in 2010

== History ==
=== Locations ===
Founded in 1840, the club ranks amongst the oldest in the Manchester area and had its first ground at Thatch Leach Lane in Whitefield. In 1850 the club moved the short distance to Diggle Hills until 1862 when Manchester Corporation acquired the cricket pitch so that a new reservoir could be built. Next in the order was Stack Meadow (where Highfield Road is now located) which was to remain the club's home until notice was served to leave the ground in 1903. A year later, Prestwich Cricket and Tennis Club as it was then called, moved to its current location at Heys Road.

=== Sections ===
The club started as solely a cricket club up until tennis was introduced in 1891 (competitive fixtures commencing in 1893). Crown green bowls was included in 1914 with the most recent addition of an official sporting section being that of football in 2009.

== Prestwich Cricket Club ==
Responsible for over 170 years of cricket in the town, Prestwich has played in numerous leagues and competitions right up to the formation of the Lancashire County League after the demise of the Lancashire and Cheshire League in 1994. The last decade has brought the club's most successful period in their entire history with three First Division Championship titles, three Walkden cups, three Division Two Championships, six Hulme Trophy cups and four T. Saville Whittle successes. This haul included an unprecedented Lancashire County League 'quadruple' in 2007 where the first and second teams both won their league and cup competitions. The current first team, captained by Steven Lorenzini, are reigning First Division champions.

The club has a third team competing in the North Manchester Cricket League as well as a junior competitive section for a variety of ages.

== Prestwich Tennis Club ==
With six floodlit all-weather tennis courts, Prestwich Tennis club attracts players of all ages all year round for competitive and social tennis. Summer and winter leagues and competitions cater for both doubles and singles players while the club's resident LTA coach hosts numerous events and training camps for both junior members and children from around the local area. The tennis section was also the first traditional tennis club to achieve their Clubmark accreditation.

== Prestwich Bowling Club ==
A popular destination around the local leagues, Prestwich Bowling Club members compete in numerous senior and veteran competitions throughout the summer months. Also well received are the various annual social events and tournaments held at the club. The Bowling section achieved its Clubmark accreditation in 2010 from Greater Sport.

== Prestwich Football Club ==
While a number of teams have played under the club's banner over the years, the current football section was started in 2005 by Alan Michaelovitz and Peter Lorenzini under the name Prestwich CC Football Club playing in the Bury & District Sunday League. In 2009, the club dropped the 'CC' from its name and expanded to include open age Saturday teams in the Lancashire Amateur League and as well as junior teams competing in numerous local leagues. The club gained Charter Standard status through the Lancashire FA in January 2010. As of the 2011/12 season, the First Team play in the Premier Division, the Reserve Team in Division Four and the A Team in Division Five. The Sunday Team are in their respective Premier Division also.

== Awards ==
- Lancashire Cricket Board Outstanding Service to Cricket Awards 2011 "Building Partnerships"
- Lancashire Cricket Board Outstanding Service to Cricket Awards 2010 "Leagues & Boards"
- Bury Sports Awards "Club of the Year" 2010
