= St Monica's High School =

St Monica's R.C. High School
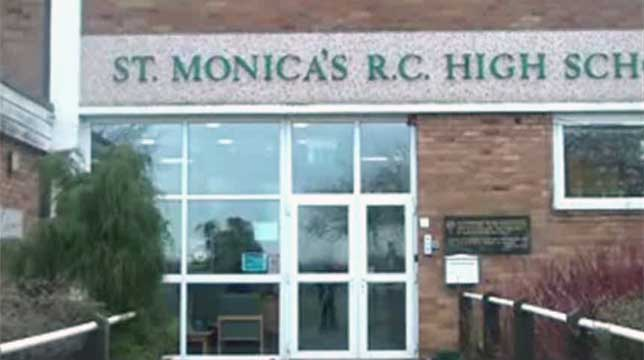

Location
- Bury Old Road; Prestwich, Greater Manchester, M25 1JH; England; 53.526°N 2.266°W

Information
- Type: Academy
- Motto: "Prayer & Service"
- Religious affiliation: Roman Catholic
- Established: 1987
- Local authority: Bury
- Trust: St Teresa Of Calcutta Catholic Academy Trust
- Department for Education URN: 148050 Tables
- Ofsted: Reports
- Chair of local governing body: John Costello
- Head teacher: Emma Keenan
- Gender: Coeducational
- Age: 11 to 16
- Website: https://www.stmonicas.stoccat.org.uk/

St Monica's R.C. High School is a coeducational secondary school on Bury Old Road in Prestwich, Greater Manchester, England, opposite Heaton Park.

It serves pupils mainly from the areas of Prestwich, Whitefield, Kersal, Cheetham Hill and Radcliffe, and all those in the parish communities of its associated primary schools.

== History ==
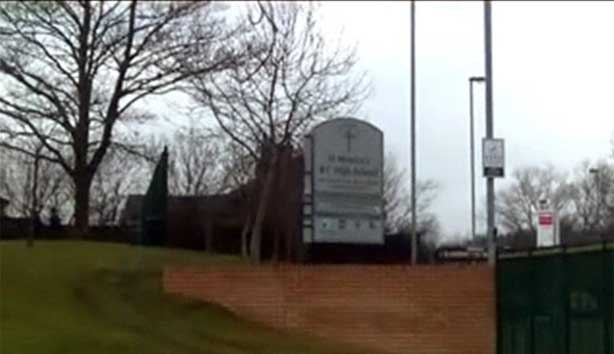
Sign at the front of St Monica's RC High School, next to Bury Old Road.

St Monica's RC High School was formed when two schools; St Joseph's RC High School, Whitefield and St Peter's RC High School, Prestwich, amalgamated and settled on the former St Peter's site on Bury Old Road. The school opened on 1 September 1987.

During Pope John Paul II's visit to the United Kingdom in 1982 the school (St Peter's RC High School at the time) was used as the base for local authorities and members of the Pope's entourage. The Pope made his appearance in nearby Heaton Park making the school an ideal place to run the operations from.

The school achieved Beacon status in 2001, gained its specialist status as a language college in 2003, and became an applied learning college in 2011, before the closing of its sixth form centre in 2017 due to poor intake.

Previously a voluntary aided school administered by Bury Metropolitan Borough Council, in August 2020 St Monica's High School converted to academy status. The school is now sponsored by the St Teresa Of Calcutta Catholic Academy Trust.

In 1998, a pupil was forced to move schools after being bullied with violence and verbal abuse, whilst the student's mother accused the school of failing to deal with the situation properly. Headteacher at the time, Mr. Austin Campbell denied these claims against the school, claiming "the situation was dealt with properly and professionally throughout".

In 1999, along with two other Bury Catholic high schools, St Monica's chose to ban an informational book for young people about sex and contraception. The school was accused of '"burying their heads in the sand"' by local youth workers.

In 2006, A St Monica's pupil; Carl Neill, was subject to an attack by a gang of up to 40 youths from Prestwich Community High School (now Prestwich Arts College) from which the pupil sustained multiple fractures to the face. The attack took place outside St Monica's and was believed to be an unprovoked assault as a result of a feud between the two schools. Due to the risk of revenge attacks, headteacher Frank McCarron was forced to hold assemblies urging students to refrain from retaliation. Two Prestwich Community High School students were arrested and later found guilty of the attack. The 17- and 15-year-old boys were each sentenced to six months in a young offenders institute.

In September 2008, the school banned female pupils from receiving the cervical cancer HPV vaccine on school premises. The school's governors believed that the school was the wrong place for the treatment to be administered and feared side effects. A school governor stated "We do not believe that school is the right place for the three injections to be administered". A spokesman for the Diocese of Salford said "the diocese and Catholic schools board do not have a moral objection, but it is up to individual schools to decide whether to allow the vaccinations to be carried out in school".

In 2011, teacher Arnold Solomon was arrested following allegations he suggested a child have sex with him. The 55-year-old electronics teacher was alleged to have suggested that the under-16-year-old girl should "go all the way" with him. Solomon, who denied the offense, was suspended from the school and released on bail pending further inquiries.

In 2012 a police investigation was launched in the school against a pupil after a suspected poisoning of a teacher with a cleaning chemical. The 30 year old Male teacher was taken to hospital with throat pain and breathing difficulties after sipping the drink that was on his desk. Detectives confirmed that there were traces of a whiteboard cleaning chemical in his drink and investigated whether it was contaminated by a pupil or by accident. Headteacher, at the time, Frank McCarron stated: “We are aware of an incident which took place on Wednesday and it is currently being investigated.” The teacher was released from hospital after having his stomach pumped and no formal charges were brought against the pupil.

In 2013; Mark Harrison, a former maths teacher, was accused and convicted of six child sex offences involving a 14-year-old schoolgirl. Harrison admitted traveling to meet the girl on at least two occasions between 1 March and 20 May this year, with the intention of committing a sexual offence. These included five counts of sexual activity with a child and one count of child grooming. Harrison stood before Bolton Crown Court on 25 October 2013 and plead guilty to four counts of sexual activity however denied the fifth. On 6 December 2013 the 49-year-old was jailed for 30 months for his offences.

In November 2015, a Freedom of Information Act request to the Taxpayers' Alliance revealed that a member of staff was receiving somewhere between £100,000 and £149,999 in remuneration. Allegations were launched against the school regarding unfairly high pay of individual members of staff, leading to accusations of inappropriately dispensing public money not in line with financial regulations. Despite these accusations, the school claimed that this information was false, claiming "No one at St Monica's was paid a salary over £100,000 in the 2013/14 tax year and this remains the case." However, a spokesman from the Taxpayers' Alliance insisted the data was correct, and they had correctly responded to the Freedom of Information Act request.

In 2016, reports from a parent claimed that male pupils were being punished for gathering in groups of three or more within the school premises. The post claimed that while boys were not allowed to gather, the same rules did not apply to girls and criticised the headteacher's policy on the matter. Headteacher Andrea Letcher denied these claims however, stating that such a thing was not school policy.

After receiving poor admission rates, the school's new sixth form centre was forced to close. The board made the case to Bury Council's education cabinet, who approved the closure in April 2017. In the aftermath of the decision, parents said that the children should not have been accepted for admission in the academic year, when the school was aware that the numbers were too low to receive the Department for Education funding needed to keep the centre running. The decision was criticised by the press and members of the public as being part of a 'vanity project' on behalf of the school. The college had had a poor intake since its opening in 2011.

=== Ofsted inspections ===
An inspection of the school's involvement with parents and carers was carried out by Ofsted on 9 November 2009, in which the school was given 'outstanding' status in overall effectiveness. The inspection judgements included parental involvement on outcomes, impact of the involvement of parents on the quality of provision and inclusion and impact of leadership and management on the involvement of parents.

In February 2018, an inspection stated the school was inadequate in 'overall effectiveness', 'effectiveness of leadership and management', 'quality of teaching' and 'outcomes for pupils', and required improvement in 'personal development, behaviour and welfare'. The report claims that "leaders do not give governors accurate information about the quality of teaching or outcomes for pupils", "the majority of pupils underachieve in mathematics", and that "although reducing, leaders temporarily exclude too many pupils from school and from lessons." The school was subsequently placed in special measures by Ofsted. A followup visit by Ofsted in October 2018 found the school's leaders and managers were "not taking effective action towards the removal of special measures."

A full school inspection was last carried out by Ofsted in December 2019, which found that the school had "improved significantly", but in which the school was given 'Requires improvement' status in overall effectiveness. The inspection judgements included achievement of pupils, quality of teaching, behaviour and safety of pupils and leadership and management, all of which were also given 'Requires improvement' status.

== Grounds ==
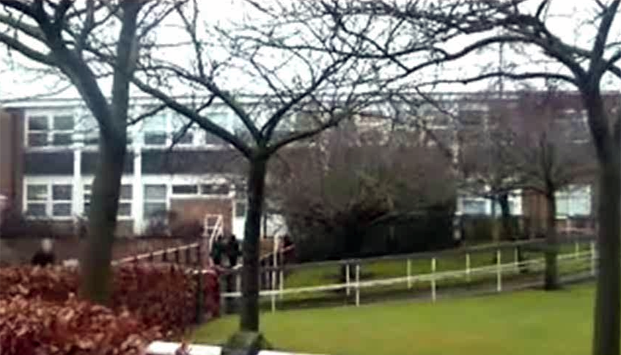
Grounds and disabled ramp at the front of St Monica's RC High School leading to the top playground.

In 2010 a new building at the south end of the school was constructed, comprising 6 new classrooms for the purposes of teaching English. After a £6.6 million grant, a sixth form applied learning centre was completed in September 2011. The building contains a library, computer suite, theatre performance area and sports facilities. The sixth form centre shut down in 2017 due to poor admission numbers, however the space continues to be used by Elms Bank College.

== Headteachers ==
- 1987–1998; Austin Campbell
- 1998–2012; Frank McCarron
- 2012–2017; Andrea Letcher
- 2017–2019; Mrs. A. Hainsworth
- 2019–2021; Mr C. Foley
- 2021–present; Mrs. E Keenan

== Notable former pupils ==
- Paul Arthurs, member of Oasis
- Jenny Frost, member of Atomic Kitten
- Guy Garvey, lead singer of Elbow
- Cynthia Murphy, author
- Marc Tierney, retired footballer who played for Norwich City, Oldham Athletic and Bolton Wanderers
- Rebecca Ryan, actress known for Shameless and Casualty
- Aaron Morley, footballer currently playing for Bolton Wanderers
