= Robert Bardsley =

English cricketer and colonial administrator (1890–1952)

Personal information
- Full name: Robert Vickers Bardsley
- Born: 28 June 1890; Prestwich, England
- Died: 26 July 1952 (aged 62); Pulborough, England
- Batting: Right-handed
- Bowling: Leg-break

Domestic team information
- Years: Team
- 1910–1913: Oxford University
- 1910–1913: Lancashire
- 1920: Lancashire
- 1920–1922: Free Foresters
- First-class debut: 30 May 1910 Oxford University v Worcestershire
- Last First-class: 10 June 1922 Free Foresters v Cambridge University

Career statistics
Competition	First-class
Matches	31
Runs scored	964
Batting average	18.53
100s/50s	0/5
Top score	72
Balls bowled	579
Wickets	12
Bowling average	28.66
5 wickets in innings	0
10 wickets in match	0
Best bowling	3–15
Catches/stumpings	19/–
- Source: CricketArchive, 30 November 2009

Robert Vickers Bardsley CMG OBE (28 June 1890 – 26 July 1952) was an English cricketer and colonial administrator.

== Biography ==
Born in Prestwich, Lancashire, Bardsley was educated at Shrewsbury School and Merton College, Oxford. He played a total of 31 first-class matches for Oxford University, Lancashire County Cricket Club and Free Foresters between 1910 and 1922. He was awarded a Blue for cricket and played in the University Match against Cambridge in three seasons between 1911 and 1913.

Bardsley went on to be Private Secretary to the Governor-General of Sudan from 1924 to 1925 and then Governor of the Blue Nile Province from 1928 to 1932.
