= Betty Tebbs =

English activist for women's rights and peace campaigner

Betty Tebbs (10 April 1918 – 23 January 2017) was an English activist for women's rights and a peace campaigner. She was described by the People's History Museum in Manchester as "a radical hero who worked tirelessly and with great humility to campaign for equal rights, workers' rights and peace her whole life".

== Personal life ==
Tebbs was the youngest child of a joiner and a maid. She was born in Bury, Lancashire, on 10 April 1918 and the rheumatic fever suffered during her childhood meant that she had a patchy education. She was married to Ernest Whewell until 1944, when he died during active service in the Second World War.

Tebbs, who lived latterly in Prestwich, married for a second time in 1947. Her second husband, Leonard Tebbs, a former soldier and university lecturer who died in 1979, aged 61, had encouraged her in campaigning for peace and also to further her education at college when in her 50s. The couple had met in 1945 and had a son, Glyn. She also had a daughter, Patricia, from her first marriage. Encouragement from her grandchildren led to publication of an autobiography titled A Time to Remember in 2007.

== Activism ==
Tebbs became involved in activism around the age of 14 when she realised that a boy with whom she worked at the East Lancashire Paper Mill (ELPM) was earning two shillings per week more than she was for doing the same job. Tebbs was a lifelong member of a trades union – initially, the National Union of Printing, Bookbinding and Paper Workers – from the time that she discovered the pay discrepancy at ELPM. She was involved in union activities there for 17 years until the death of Whewell in 1944. In 1968 she played a role in the Society of Graphical and Allied Trades adopting a motion that the National Economic Council establish a women's advisory committee, that would advise the council on issues affecting women workers. Tebbs had stated that the trade union movement had not been sufficiently successful in addressing women's issues.

After Whewell's death, she was dismayed with the unfairness of a tax and allowance system that she thought penalised war widows. At a union conference in 1960 she advocated for the withdrawal of U.S. troops from their bases in Britain. She also became prominent in peace activism and joined the Campaign for Nuclear Disarmament when it began in 1958. She became chair of the National Assembly of Women in 1978, having joined it in 1952, and met with world leaders in her attempts to bring about nuclear disarmament. (Note: Tebbs' role in the National Assembly of Women gave her a seat on the Women's International Democratic Federation and it was through this that she travelled the world to campaign.) Tebbs was banned from entering the United States due to her activism, and her protests against the Trident nuclear programme at Faslane led to her arrest at the age of 89.

Tebbs also continued working for women's rights as a member of trade unions, and led a successful strike for equal pay at ELPM in the early 1950s. She persuaded a number of women to join her union at the mill she worked at after leaving ELPM, and herself moved up the union hierarchy, representing it as district representative, district committee member, and as women's representative for the northwestern region. She attended union conferences in Scarborough in 1958 and 1960, and attended the International Women's Conference in Switzerland on behalf of the union. She also worked on campaigns for equality at numerous other industrial sites and established a refuge at Warrington for women who had suffered from domestic violence.

In 1963 she was elected to the Radcliffe Municipal Borough Council against stiff opposition, running as a Labour Party candidate. For some time she was the sole woman on the council. Tebbs had left the Communist Party of Great Britain (CPGB) in protest against the Hungarian Revolution of 1956. She later left Labour to rejoin the CPGB, and then the New Communist Party. Later still, she returned to the Labour Party fold to vote for Jeremy Corbyn in the 2015 party leadership election.

== Recognition ==
Tebbs was interviewed at the People's History Museum (PHM) by actor and activist Maxine Peake in June 2016. Shortly before her death on 23 January 2017 at the age of 98, she was recognised with the PHM's Radical Hero Award, which described her as "a radical hero who worked tirelessly and with great humility to campaign for equal rights, workers' rights and peace her whole life." In 2010, she had been given an award named after Elizabeth Gaskell by Manchester City Council. A fellow activist stated that Tebbs' work had provided the foundation for legislation protecting all women.
