= Prestwich Town Hall =

Municipal building in Greater Manchester, England

Coordinates: 53.5258°N 2.2716°W

Prestwich Town Hall is a former municipal building on Scholes Lane, Prestwich, a town in Greater Manchester in England. The building, which served as the offices and meeting place of Prestwich Borough Council and has since been converted into apartments, is a Grade II listed building.

== History ==
The building was commissioned by a contractor and quarry owner from East Lothian, Robert Neill, as his own house. Neill made his money on a series of important construction projects including the Manchester Central Station. The site he selected was open land on the north side of Scholes Lane. The new house was designed in the Italianate style, built in ashlar stone and was completed in the 1850s. It was originally known as "Bent Hill". On the ground floor, it had a drawing room, billiard room, library and study, while upstairs were bedrooms and a bathroom, and the cellar included the servants' hall, scullery, laundry, butler's closet and pantry, and washing and brewing rooms. Among the outbuildings was a lodge at the corner of Ostrich Lane and Scholes Lane, which was a scaled-down version of the main house. From 1870 until the end of the century, the house was leased by a merchant, James Alexander Bannerman.

In 1919, the building and estate was purchased by Prestwich Urban District Council, for use as its offices. The council relocated from Chester Bank on Bury New Road, which it had previously used as its offices. The council constructed council housing on 16 acres of the 33 acres of grounds at Bent Hill. A captured German cannon was placed outside the house, which in 1926 crushed to death a child who was playing on it.

In 1939, Prestwich became a municipal borough, and the offices were renamed Prestwich Town Hall. During Warship Week in 1942, local people raised funds to pay for a British U-class submarine, HMS Utmost; a plaque was subsequently placed in the town hall to acknowledge the fund raising effort. A roll of honour, to commemorate the lives of local service personnel who had died during the Second World War was installed in the town hall after the war.

The building continued to serve as the offices of Prestwich Urban District Council for much of the 20th century, but ceased to be the local seat of government when Bury Metropolitan Borough Council was formed in 1974. The building subsequently became a nursing home known as "Manor House Rest Home". Following the closure of the nursing home in 1999, it stood empty until it was converted into a series of apartments, known as "The Residences".

== Architecture ==
The building was grade II listed in 1986. It is in the Italianate style, and is built of stone, with a slate roof. It has a tetrastyle portico, formed by Tuscan order columns supporting a prominent cornice in the middle of the three-bay frontage, with a single-bay addition to the left, and a three-storey service wing to the right. The other bays are fenestrated by sash windows flanked by brackets on the ground floor, and by a central Venetian window flanked by a pair of sash windows on the first floor. Inside, much original plasterwork and panelling survives, although they suffered vandalism while the building was unoccupied.

== See also ==
- Listed buildings in Prestwich
