= Fred Worthington (footballer) =

English footballer

Personal information
- Date of birth: 6 January 1924
- Place of birth: Prestwich, England
- Date of death: December 1995 (age 71)
- Place of death: Tameside, England
- Position: Inside forward

Senior career*
Years	Team	Apps	(Gls)
1947–1951	Bury	69	(14)
1951–1955	Leicester City	55	(9)
1955–1956	Exeter City	16	(1)
1956–1957	Oldham Athletic	10	(1)
1957–1958	Chorley		
Total		150	(25)
- * Club domestic league appearances and goals

Fred Worthington (6 January 1924 – December 1995) was an English footballer who played as an inside forward in the Football League.
