= Listed buildings in Prestwich =

Prestwich is a town in the Metropolitan Borough of Bury, Greater Manchester, England, and includes the village of Simister and the surrounding countryside. It is unparished, and contains 48 listed buildings that are recorded in the National Heritage List for England. Of these, one is listed at Grade I, the highest of the three grades, one is at Grade II*, the middle grade, and the others are at Grade II, the lowest grade. The town is largely residential, and its most important building is St Mary's Church. The church and numerous associated structures, particularly tombs and monuments in the churchyard, are listed. The other listed buildings include houses and associated structures, other churches, a public house, structures associated with the Thirlmere to Manchester water supply, a boundary stone, and two war memorials.

== Key ==
| Grade | Criteria |
|---|---|
| I | Buildings of exceptional interest, sometimes considered to be internationally important |
| II* | Particularly important buildings of more than special interest |
| II | Buildings of national importance and special interest |

== Buildings ==
| Name and location | Photograph | Date | Notes | Grade |
|---|---|---|---|---|
| St Mary's Church; 53.52944°N 2.28666°W | | 15th century | The oldest part of the church is the tower, the aisles date from the 16th century, the south porch was added in 1856, and two chapels in 1874–75. In 1888–89 Austin and Paley built the chancel, a chapel, a vestry and an organ chamber, and the north porch was added in 1895. The church is built in red sandstone with slate roofs, and consists of a nave with a clerestory flanked by aisles and chapels, a chancel with a clerestory and a north organ chamber and vestry, a south chapel, and a west tower. The tower has three stages and an embattled parapet, there is a stair turret with a polygonal cap between the chancel and the vestry, and the east window has seven lights with Perpendicular tracery. | I |
| Sundial, rectory 53.52981°N 2.28568°W | — | c. 1630 (probable) | The sundial is in the grounds of the rectory, and stands on a plinth. It has a square base with strapwork carvings, an octagonal shaft, and four faces; the gnomons are missing. | II |
| Tomb of children of Thomas Collier; 53.52930°N 2.28626°W | — | 1641 | The tomb is in the churchyard of St Mary's Church. It consists of a flat slab and has an inscription in capital letters. | II |
| Ashworth grave slab 53.52925°N 2.28634°W | — | c. 1668 | The grave slab is in the churchyard of St Mary's Church, and commemorates members of the Ashworth family. It consists of a rectangular sandstone slab with an incised scroll and a heart motif, and is inscribed with the names of those buried in the grave. | II |
| Scholefeild grave slab 53.52928°N 2.28670°W | — | c. 1670 | The grave slab is in the churchyard of St Mary's Church, and commemorates two members of the Scholefeild family. It consists of a rectangular sandstone slab incised with decorative motifs, and the names of those buried in the grave. Other names were added later. | II |
| Mason family grave slab 53.52933°N 2.28694°W | — | c. 1671 | The grave slab is in the churchyard of St Mary's Church, and commemorates James Mason and other members of the Mason family. It consists of a rectangular sandstone slab incised with decorative motifs, and the names of those buried in the grave. | II |
| Mary Lancashire grave slab 53.52933°N 2.28630°W | — | c. 1672 | The grave slab is in the churchyard of St Mary's Church, and commemorates Mary Lancashire and other members of the Lancashire family. It consists of a rectangular sandstone slab incised with decorative motifs, and the names of those buried in the grave. Other family names were added later. | II |
| Travis grave slab 53.52922°N 2.28627°W | — | c. 1675 | The grave slab is in the churchyard of St Mary's Church, and commemorates John Travis. It consists of a rectangular sandstone slab, deeply incised, with the names of those buried in the grave, including members of the Bowker family, who died later. | II |
| Barlowe grave slab 53.52926°N 2.28646°W | — | c. 1686 | The grave slab is in the churchyard of St Mary's Church, and commemorates members of the Barlowe family. It consists of a damaged rectangular sandstone slab with an incised decorative flower motif, and is inscribed with a long epitaph, and the names of those buried in the grave. | II |
| James Grimshaw grave slab 53.52931°N 2.28667°W | — | c. 1686 | The grave slab is in the churchyard of St Mary's Church, and commemorates James Grimshaw and other members of the Grimshaw family. It consists of a rectangular sandstone slab, deeply incised, with a large fleur-de-lis motif, inscriptions, including a verse, and the names of those buried in the grave. | II |
| Holland grave slab 53.52927°N 2.28658°W | — | c. 1687 | The grave slab is in the churchyard of St Mary's Church, and commemorates two female members of the Holland family. It consists of a rectangular sandstone slab deeply incised with a large fleur-de-lis motif and inscriptions relating to those buried in the grave. | II |
| Hardman grave slab 53.52928°N 2.28699°W | — | c. 1695 | The grave slab is in the churchyard of St Mary's Church, and commemorates Ralph Hardman, his daughter, and two other people. It is a rectangular slab incised with a Green Man style face in a scrolled motif, and carries inscriptions relating to those buried in the grave. | II |
| Ramsbotham grave slab 53.52956°N 2.28664°W | | c. 1697 | The grave slab is on the main footpath in the churchyard of St Mary's Church, and commemorates members of the Ramsbotham family. It consists of a sandstone slab with inscriptions and decoration. | II |
| James Lancashire grave slab 53.52935°N 2.28628°W | | c. 1737 | The grave slab is in the churchyard of St Mary's Church, and commemorates James Lancashire and his wife. It consists of a rectangular sandstone slab deeply incised, including a crenellated band, an angel's head with outstretched wings, and the names of those buried in the grave. Other names were added later. | II |
| 38 Church Lane; 53.52988°N 2.28608°W | | 18th century | A brick house with a wooden cornice on ogee brackets. There are three storeys and three bays. On the lower two floors the windows are sashes, and on the top floor they are sliding casements. | II |
| Church Inn; 53.52983°N 2.28620°W | | 18th century | The public house is in brick with a rendered front. There are three storeys and three bays, and the windows are sashes. | II |
| Courtyard block, Nazareth House; 53.52552°N 2.26875°W | — | 18th century | Originally a stable block, it forms four sides of a courtyard. The block is in brick with a hipped slate roof, and has two storeys. The front has seven bays, the middle three bays projecting under a pediment, and the windows are sashes. There are three arches, the central one leading into the courtyard, and the others in the end bays, one of which is blocked, and the other is blind. | II |
| Sundial, St Mary's Church; 53.52922°N 2.28667°W | — | 18th century (probable) | The sundial, in the churchyard, is in stone, and consists of a large baluster on two steps. The metalwork has been lost. | II |
| Nazareth House; 53.52576°N 2.26773°W | — | c. 1792 | The house is in Georgian style, in brick with a cornice, a parapet, and a hipped slate roof. There are two storeys, a symmetrical front of five bays, and a recessed two-bay wing on the left. The middle three bays project slightly under a pediment, and on the front is a porch with paired Ionic columns, an entablature, and a blocking course. | II |
| Mounting block 53.52960°N 2.28623°W | — | 18th or 19th century | The mounting block is adjacent to the pathway at the east entrance to the churchyard of St Mary's Church. It is a sandstone monolith and has three steps. | II |
| Philips Park Conservatory; 53.53195°N 2.30794°W | | Shortly after 1800 | The conservatory is in Philips Park. It is in ashlar stone, and has five large vertical windows on the front, the central window projecting under a pediment. The conservatory has a glazed roof and a circular lantern. | II |
| Hearse house 53.52962°N 2.28644°W | — | 1801 | The hearse house is in the churchyard of St Mary's Church. It is in brick with ashlar dressings and has a slate roof. At the left end is a doorway with a shallow arched head and a stone lintel. The interior is divided into two parts, and contains a stone crest dated 1668, and a late medieval stone tomb slab with an incised floriated cross and shears. | II |
| Diggles table tomb 53.52914°N 2.28633°W | | c. 1804 | The table tomb is in the churchyard of St Mary's Church, and commemorates Mary Diggles. It is in sandstone, and was produced by a female stonemason. The tomb consists of a rectangular table on six short legs with a recessed panel. The surface depicts in low relief an angel blowing a trumpet, hearts and urns, and an inscription including a poem by Mary's husband. Further names were added later. | II |
| Garden temple 53.53242°N 2.30869°W | — | Early 19th century | This is a small rectangular structure in ashlar stone in the form of a temple in Philips Park. It has an archway framed by modified Tuscan half-columns and a dentilled cornice, and contains the statue of a draped female figure. | II |
| Gate piers and walls, St Mary's Church; 53.52965°N 2.28610°W | | 1827 | The walls stretch along the north, east and south boundaries of the churchyard, and were extended on the south side in 1886. They are mainly in sandstone with curved copings, and there is a section in red brick. The gate piers are in openwork cast iron and have flat tops, colonettes to the corners and latticework in between. On the west face of the wall is a large oval stone inscribed with the date. | II |
| Marker stone 53.52937°N 2.28626°W | — | 1827 | The stone is adjacent to St Mary's Church. It is triangular, measuring 4 feet (1.2 m) by 4 feet (1.2 m) by 5 feet (1.5 m) and is inscribed with a message asking the public to keep off the grass. | II |
| Memorial to Lawrence Hollinshed; 53.52903°N 2.28685°W | | 1839 | The memorial is in the churchyard of St Mary's Church and is in Gothic style. It consists of a tall oblong chest tomb with decorated panels and a concave peaked roof. There are crockets on the ridges and on a finial. | II |
| St Margaret's Church; 53.53697°N 2.26955°W | | 1849–1852 | A Commissioners' church that was extended later in the 19th century, and restored following a fire in 1985. It is in stone and has a slate roof with stone coped gables. The church consists of a nave and chancel in one cell, north and south aisles under separate roofs, a north porch, a southeast vestry, and a southwest porch acting as a columbarium. There are crocketed pinnacles at both ends of the church, and at the east end of the north aisle is a bell turret with a spirelet. | II |
| Sturgeon family grave slab 53.52919°N 2.28729°W | | c. 1850 | The grave slab commemorates the electrical inventor William Sturgeon and members of his family. It is in the churchyard of St Mary's Church, and consists of a sandstone slab carrying an inscription and the names of those buried in the grave. | II |
| North Lodge, gate post and railings 53.52174°N 2.27477°W | — | Mid-19th century | The former lodge to Hilton Hall is in brick and is in cottage orné style, with one storey with an attic. There are gables on two fronts with decorative bargeboards and finials, and containing bay windows with mullioned and transomed windows. To the east is a turret with a coat of arms and a bellcote. The gatepost is in stone with an octagonal cap. | II |
| Prestwich Town Hall; 53.52592°N 2.27160°W | — | Mid-19th century | A stone house, later used for other purposes, with a dentilled eaves cornice, and a hipped slate roof. There are two storeys and a front of three bays, a single-bay extension to the left, and a three-storey service wing to the right. On the front is a band and a tetrastyle Tuscan portico. The windows are in moulded architraves, and those on the ground floor have bracketed hoods. In the left return the centre is pedimented with a Venetian window. | II |
| Monument to John Brooks; 53.52933°N 2.28742°W | | c. 1851 | The monument is in the churchyard of St Mary's Church, and is in Italianate style. It was designed by John Thomas, it is in Sicilian marble and granite, and consists of a square aedicule about 4.8 metres (16 ft) tall. There is a large stone plinth and a granite pedestal, and in niches on the sides of the aedicule are carved marble female figures. On the pedestal is an inscription. | II* |
| Boundary stone 53.51278°N 2.28943°W | — | 1853 | The boundary stone marks the boundary between Prestwich and Salford. It is in ashlar with a triangular plan and a chamfered top. The top is inscribed "BOUNDARY STONE", and on the sides are inscribed the names of the towns. | II |
| Greater Manchester Police Training School; 53.52062°N 2.27094°W | — | c. 1854 | Originally a private house, Sedgley House, it was extended between 1875 and 1900, and has since been used for other purposes. The building is in red brick with a Welsh slate roof. There are two storeys with an attic, and the main front has three bays, each gabled with bargeboards, the outer bays projecting to form wings with canted bay windows. On the front is a porch with an arched entrance, buttresses and a pierced parapet, and the windows are mullioned and transomed. There are three bays in the right return, and five at the rear. | II |
| Horsefield table tomb 53.52954°N 2.28747°W | | c. 1854 | The tomb commemorates the botanist John Horsefield and members of his family, and is in the churchyard of St Mary's Church. The tomb is in sandstone and has six short legs supporting a rectangular table. The surface has decorative relief carving, including a dove with an olive branch, vines, oak leaves and acorns, and a depiction of the daffodil hybridised by Horsefield. There is also an inscription and a poem by Charles Swain. | II |
| Charlton House and two lamp posts 53.52553°N 2.27573°W | — | 1866 | The house is in polychromatic brick with stone dressings and slate roofs, and is in Gothic Revival style. There are two storeys with attics, and a front of three bays. The first bay is gabled with bargeboards and contains a rectangular bay window. The middle bay contains an arched doorway, and has a pyramidal roof with a weathervane. There are two similar gables and a bay window in the right return. In front of the house are two cast iron standard lamps with globe lanterns. | II |
| Fairburn family memorial 53.52927°N 2.28738°W | — | c. 1874–75 | The memorial commemorates the engineer William Fairbairn and members of his family, and is in the churchyard of St Mary's Church. It consists of a tomb chest with a rectangular base and plinth in sandstone, and a shallow chest in grey polished granite, with moulded sides and a shallow hipped top. There are inscriptions on the north and south sides. | II |
| Slagg family memorial 53.52943°N 2.28739°W | | c. 1875–1880 | The memorial to members of the Slagg family consists of a tomb chest designed by Alfred Waterhouse, and is in the churchyard of St Mary's Church. It has a rectangular base, a chest in Gothic style with eight polished pink granite colonnettes, three yellow sandstone panels on each side, and one at the end, some with inscriptions, a foliated frieze, and a hipped canopy with a wreath and a cross. | II |
| Heaton Park Congregational Church; 53.53136°N 2.26889°W | | 1881 | The church is in brick with stone dressings and slate roofs, and is in Gothic Revival style. On the ground floor are schoolrooms, with the chapel above. Entry is through a corner tower that has paired doorways in an arch with a traceried tympanum and a hood mould. To the left is a gabled part which has flat-headed window on the ground floor and a four-light window above. Along the sides of the church are two tiers of windows. (Note: Street View in August 2014 shows that the church has been converted for residential use.) | II |
| Wrenwood and Rookwood; 53.52137°N 2.27956°W | — | 1881 | A pair of houses in Queen Anne style, built in red brick with wooden dressings and a steeply pitched tiled roof. There are two storeys and attics, and an asymmetrical front. On the ground floor are various projections, including a rectangular bay window with mullioned and transomed windows. There are varied windows on the upper floor, and on the roof are two dormers with pediments. To the left is a one-bay two-storey extension with an open arcade on the ground floor and a gabled oriel window above. | II |
| Thirlmere Aqueduct; 53.51472°N 2.29282°W | | 1892 | The aqueduct carries two pipes with water from Thirlmere to Manchester over the River Irwell. It has three cast iron arches with gritstone piers and abutments. There is much decorative ironwork. | II |
| St Hilda's Church; 53.52932°N 2.26859°W | | 1903–04 | The church is in red brick with terracotta dressings, a parapet and a slate roof with terracotta coped gables. It is in Perpendicular style, and consists of a nave, aisles, and chancel in one cell. At the west end are north and south porches, and a projecting canted baptistry. Above the north porch is a slim tower with a flèche. | II |
| St George's Church, Simister; 53.54918°N 2.25128°W | | 1914–15 | The church, which has Romanesque and Arts and Crafts features, is in stone and has a slate roof with stone coped gables and finials. It consists of a nave and chancel in one cell, a north porch, a north transept, a north vestry, and an apsidal baptistry at the west end. Extending from the gable end of the transept is a gabled bellcote. At the east end is a wheel window above blind arcading. | II |
| War memorial, St Mary's Road junction 53.52965°N 2.27802°W | | c. 1918 | Initially intended to be a temporary war memorial, it has survived and was removed to its present position in a garden at a road junction in about 1970. It consists of a timber cross with a square section, painted black, about 7 feet (2.1 m) tall. It stands in a socket in two square steps. On the steps are two inscribed granite plaques. | II |
| War memorial, St Mary's churchyard 53.52958°N 2.28624°W | | 1921 | The war memorial is in the churchyard of St Mary's Church, and its design is based on the Cross of Sacrifice by Reginald Blomfield. The memorial consists of a stepped octagonal plinth on which stands a cross in Portland stone with a stepped base, and with a bronze sword on the face. The base has inscriptions referring to both world wars. | II |
| Rectory; 53.52976°N 2.28548°W | | 1923 | The rectory is in brown brick with dressings in red brick and in stone, and has roofs partly of slate and partly of concrete. There are two storeys, and the building has a V-shaped plan. The main doorway is in the angle, and at the end of the ranges are octagonal projections. Some windows are sashes, and some are casements; the windows on the ground floor have flat heads and on the upper floor the heads are segmental. The doorways have round arches. | II |
| St Gabriel's Church; 53.52096°N 2.26526°W | | 1932–33 | The church is in brown brick with a chamfered plinth and Westmorland slate roofs. It consists of a squat tower at the liturgical west end with a hipped roof surmounted by a cross, and flanked by a chapel to the north and a porch to the south, a nave, and a short chancel with a north vestry and a south sacristy. At the west end is a doorway flanked by pilasters and moulded finials, and above it and on the sides of the tower are circular windows. Along the sides of the nave are square clerestory windows, and in the chancel the windows are round. | II |
| Heaton Park Reservoir Pumping Station; 53.54188°N 2.26893°W | | 1955–56 | The pumping station controls the supply of water from Haweswater to Manchester. It is a rectangular building in Yorkshire sandstone, without windows and with a flat roof. On the bare wall facing the road is a carved relief in Westmorland green slate by Mitzi Cunliffe, and below are five plaques telling the history of the pipeline. At the sides of the building are steps leading to the upper level. Inside the building is a wooden relief depicting the route of the pipeline. | II |

== Notes and references ==
=== Sources ===
- Historic England, "Church of St Mary, Prestwich (1067252)", National Heritage List for England
- Historic England, "Sundial in rectory grounds, Prestwich (1067293)", National Heritage List for England
- Historic England, "Tomb of children of Thomas Collier, close to south-east corner of Church of St Mary, Prestwich (1356817)", National Heritage List for England
- Historic England, "Ashworth grave slab in churchyard of church of St Mary, Prestwich (1406292)", National Heritage List for England
- Historic England, "Scholefeild grave slab in churchyard of church of St Mary, Prestwich (1406310)", National Heritage List for England
- Historic England, "Mason family grave slab in churchyard of church of St Mary, Prestwich (1406322)", National Heritage List for England
- Historic England, "Grave slab of Mary Lancashire in churchyard of church of St Mary, Prestwich (1406313)", National Heritage List for England
- Historic England, "Travis grave slab in churchyard of church of St Mary, Prestwich (1406307)", National Heritage List for England
- Historic England, "Barlowe grave slab in churchyard of church of St Mary, Prestwich (1406295)", National Heritage List for England
- Historic England, "James Grimshaw grave slab in churchyard of church of St Mary, Prestwich (1406337)", National Heritage List for England
- Historic England, "Holland grave slab in churchyard of church of St Mary, Prestwich (1406301)", National Heritage List for England
- Historic England, "Hardman grave slab in churchyard of church of St Mary, Prestwich (1406286)", National Heritage List for England
- Historic England, "Ramsbotham family grave slab in churchyard of church of St Mary, Prestwich (1406279)", National Heritage List for England
- Historic England, "Grave slab of James Lancashire in churchyard of church of St Mary, Prestwich (1406304)", National Heritage List for England
- Historic England, "No. 38 Church Lane, Prestwich (1356814)", National Heritage List for England
- Historic England, "Church Inn, Prestwich (1067251)", National Heritage List for England
- Historic England, "Courtyard block west of Nazareth House, Prestwich (1067211)", National Heritage List for England
- Historic England, "Sundial to south of Church of St Mary, Prestwich (1067255)", National Heritage List for England
- Historic England, "Middle part of main block of Nazareth House, Prestwich (1356833)", National Heritage List for England
- Historic England, "Mounting block by pathway from east entrance to churchyard of Church of St Mary, Prestwich (1067256)", National Heritage List for England
- Historic England, "Hearse house in churchyard of church of St Mary, Prestwich (1406340)", National Heritage List for England
- Historic England, "Philips Park Conservatory, Prestwich (1356812)", National Heritage List for England
- Historic England, "Diggles table tomb in churchyard of St Mary's Church, Prestwich (1406298)", National Heritage List for England
- Historic England, "Garden temple, Prestwich (1356811)", National Heritage List for England
- Historic England, "Gate piers and boundary walls to Churchyard of St Mary, Prestwich (1356815)", National Heritage List for England
- Historic England, "Stone to east of Church of St Mary, Prestwich (1250744)", National Heritage List for England
- Historic England, "Memorial to Lawrence Hollinshed to south of west end of Church of St Mary, close to south boundary of churchyard, Prestwich (1356816)", National Heritage List for England
- Historic England, "Church of St Margaret Holy Rood, Prestwich (1350343)", National Heritage List for England
- Historic England, "Manor Park Rest Home, Prestwich (1067228)", National Heritage List for England
- Historic England, "North Lodge and gate post and railing, Prestwich (1067289)", National Heritage List for England
- Historic England, "Sturgeon family grave slab in churchyard of church of St Mary, Prestwich (1406289)", National Heritage List for England
- Historic England, "Monument to John Brooks to west of Church of St Mary, Prestwich (1067254)", National Heritage List for England
- Historic England, "Boundary stone at SD8090601825 at the junction with Singleton Brook, Prestwich (1393874)", National Heritage List for England
- Historic England, "Greater Manchester Police Training School (Sedgley House), Prestwich (1067230)", National Heritage List for England
- Historic England, "Horsefield table tomb in St Mary's churchyard, Prestwich (1406283)", National Heritage List for England
- Historic England, "Charlton House, two lamp posts adjacent to southwest and southeast corners, Prestwich (1356795)", National Heritage List for England
- Historic England, "Memorial to Fairburn family to west of Church of St Mary (12 metres south-south-west of memorial to John Brooks), Prestwich (1263060)", National Heritage List for England
- Historic England, "Memorial to Slagg family to west of Church of St Mary (12 metres north-west of memorial to John Brooks), Prestwich (1250837)", National Heritage List for England
- Historic England, "Heaton Park Congregational Church, Prestwich (1356841)", National Heritage List for England
- Historic England, "Wrenwood and Rookwood, Prestwich (1356821)", National Heritage List for England
- Historic England, "Thirlmere Aqueduct over the River Irwell, Prestwich (1270372)", National Heritage List for England
- Historic England, "Church of St Hilda, Prestwich (1350345)", National Heritage List for England
- Historic England, "Church of St George, Simister (1350346)", National Heritage List for England
- Historic England, "Prestwich War memorial (1440259)", National Heritage List for England
- Historic England, "War memorial, St Mary's churchyard, Prestwich (1411837)", National Heritage List for England
- Historic England, "The Rectory, Prestwich (1405179)", National Heritage List for England
- Historic England, "Church of St Gabriel, Prestwich (1376148)", National Heritage List for England
- Historic England, "Heaton Park Reservoir Pumping Station, Prestwich (1376745)", National Heritage List for England
- Historic England, Listed Buildings
- Hartwell, Clare; Hyde, Matthew; Pevsner, Nikolaus (2004), Lancashire: Manchester and the South-East, The Buildings of England, New Haven and London: Yale University Press, ISBN 0-300-10583-5
