= Prestwich =

Town in Greater Manchester, England

Coordinates: 53.5333°N 2.2833°W

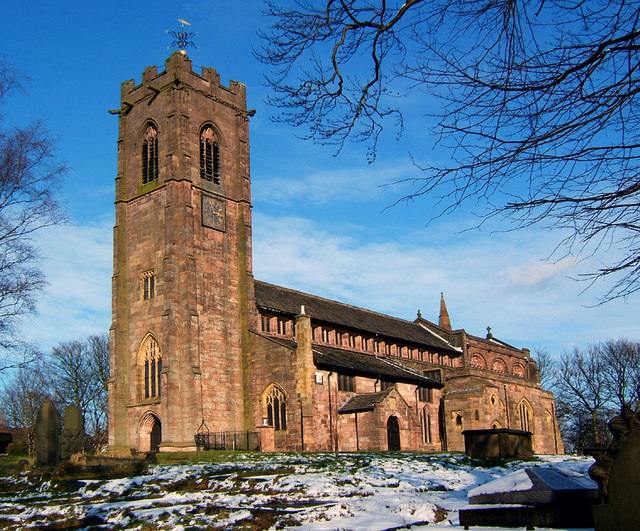
- Church of St Mary the Virgin, Prestwich, 2006

- Location within Greater Manchester
- Population: 31,500
- OS grid reference: SD814034
  - London: 166 mi (267 km) SE
- Metropolitan borough: Bury
- Metropolitan county: Greater Manchester
- Region: North West
- Country: England
- Sovereign state: United Kingdom
- Post town: MANCHESTER
- Postcode district: M25
- Dialling code: 0161
- Police: Greater Manchester
- Fire: Greater Manchester
- Ambulance: North West
- UK Parliament: Bury South

Prestwich (/ˈprɛstwɪtʃ/ PREST-witch) is a town in the Metropolitan Borough of Bury, Greater Manchester, England, three miles (five kilometres) north of Manchester, three miles (five kilometres) north of Salford and five miles (eight kilometres) south of Bury.

Within the boundaries of the historic county of Lancashire, Prestwich was the seat of the ancient parish of Prestwich-cum-Oldham, centred around the Grade I listed Church of St Mary the Virgin. In recent times, it has grown in popularity as a commuter town of Manchester, being consistently named one of the best places to live in the UK by The Sunday Times, and has been nicknamed the 'new Didsbury' in comparison with the affluent suburb in the south of the city.

The oldest part of Prestwich, around Bury New Road, is known as Prestwich Village. There is a large Jewish community in Prestwich which, together with neighbouring Whitefield, Broughton and Crumpsall, makes up the second largest Jewish community in the UK outside London.

== Toponymy ==
Prestwich is possibly of Old English origin, derived from preost and wic, which translates to the priest's farm. Another possible derivation is priest's retreat. Wic was a place-name element derived from the Latin vicus, place. Its most common meaning is dairy-farm. The township was variously recorded as Prestwich in 1194, Prestwic in 1202 and Prestewic in 1203.

== History ==
=== Early history ===
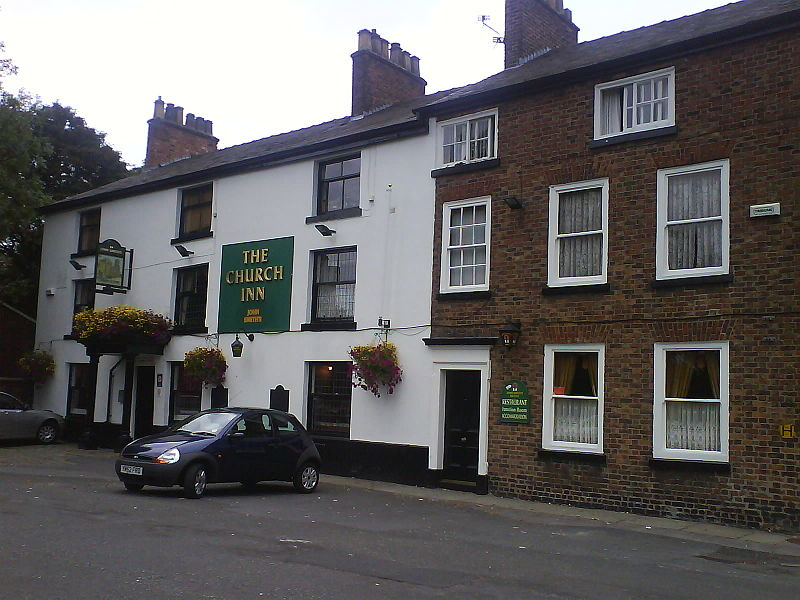
The Church Inn (formerly the Ostrich Inn) next to St Mary's Church, 2008

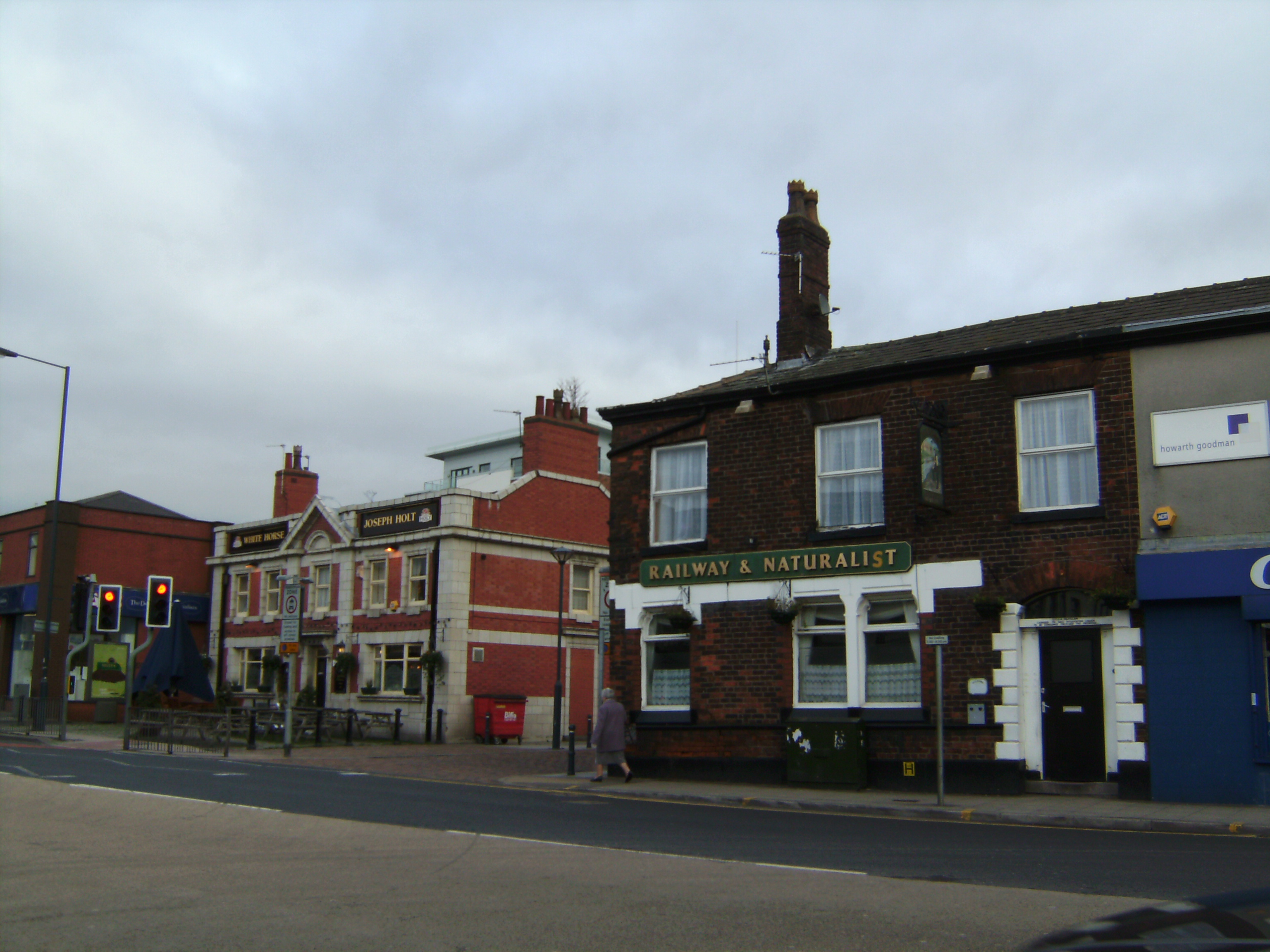
The White Horse (left) and the Railway and Naturalist (right) in Prestwich Village, 2008

Bury New Road roughly follows the line of a Roman road connecting forts at Mamucium (Manchester) and Bremetennacum (Ribchester). It is possible that a Roman fort or encampment was built at "Castle Hill", near the Salford border, mirroring an encampment on Rainsough Hill equidistant from the Roman road. John Booker B.A., 19th century author and curate of the parish church, considered these were agrarian camps built to protect cattle kept in the woods of Broughton and Kersal. The camp was "just to the right of the old road to Bury, immediately beyond Singleton Brook, on the first field in the Parish of Prestwich, which was formerly known as Lowcaster". Roman coins have been found off Bury New Road, near Prestwich Golf Course and some in Prestwich Clough.

A hoard of 65 silver coins from the reign of King Stephen was found in the Sedgley Park area in 1972. The Prestwich manor emerged in the Middle Ages and in 1212 was assessed as four oxgang of land held by Adam de Prestwich whose father, Robert held it in 1193. The lord of the manor held the advowson for the church. Another Adam de Prestwich settled the manors of Prestwich, Alkrington and Pendlebury on his son John in 1297 but remarried and in 1313 settled the same manors on Thomas de Prestwich, his son by second wife. Thomas de Prestwich had daughters, Margaret who became a nun at Seaton Priory in 1360, but left the convent to marry Robert de Holland, and Agnes who married John de Radcliffe but died childless in 1362. Thomas de Prestwich granted his manors to Richard de Radcliffe for life and after that the manor was held by Richard de Langley. In 1371 Robert de Holland claimed the manor as the right of his wife. Roger de Langley was a minor and ward of the Duke of Lancaster in 1372 when Robert de Holland and a troop of armed men took possession of the manor by force and retained it until 1389. The Langleys regained the manor after 1403.

After Sir Robert Langley's death in 1561 the manor passed to his daughter Margaret, who married John Reddish. Their granddaughter Sarah married Clement Coke and the manor descended in the Coke family, until 1777, when Thomas William Coke, Coke of Norfolk, a leader in the agricultural revolution sold the land in Prestwich to increase his Norfolk estates. The manor was acquired by Peter Drinkwater of Irwell House in 1794 and it descended to his son Thomas who died in 1861. Irwell House and Drinkwater Park was sold to Salford Corporation and Prestwich Council. In 1561 other lands went to Sir Robert's other daughters. Polefield, on higher ground to the north of Prestwich, became a separate estate, with Polefield Hall coming in the 19th century to the Earls of Wilton.

In the hearth tax of 1666 there were 97 hearths in the township, the rector's house was the largest with ten. In the 17th and 18th centuries local government was based on the parish structure. The lord of the manor administered land tenure and inheritance, but law and order was kept by parish constables assisted by the church wardens. The local justices sat in the "Star Chamber" in the Ostrich Inn, now the Church Inn, close to the parish church where the justices' seat can still be seen. The village had stocks which remained in use until 1800.

=== Development ===
The settlement grew to serve the parish church making Church Lane the historic centre. In the late 18th century the area was mainly rural with scattered farms and small settlements grew at Great and Little Heaton. The population was estimated at 670. Rooden Lane which became part of Bury Old Road was a centre for hand loom weaving and at Simister and neighbouring Bowlee, silk weaving was established. During the 19th century another settlement grew around the junction of Fairfax Road and Bury New Road along with another village centre on Bury Old Road. The area between these centres remained rural, however, the arrival of the railway in 1881 encouraged affluent merchants from Manchester to build villas and move to the town.

Prestwich Hospital was built as an asylum in 1851 and by 1900 it had grown into the largest asylum in Europe. Sedgley Park Teacher Training College was established in Prestwich after the Faithful Companions of Jesus bought a house to accommodate it in 1903. When Mike Leigh was a lecturer at the Catholic women teachers' training college Sedgley Park he devised and directed two big-cast projects for the Manchester Youth Theatre: Big Basil and Glum Victoria and the Lad with Specs. The National Archives holds records relating to the college.

By 1912 the population had increased to 12,800, and from the 1930s onwards the remaining fields were developed and by 1961 the population reached 31,000 and Prestwich had become a suburb of Manchester.

== Governance ==
=== Political representation ===
Prestwich, together with Whitefield and Radcliffe, is part of the marginal Bury South Parliamentary constituency, which has been represented by MP Christian Wakeford since 2019. Wakeford stood as a Conservative and gained the seat from the Labour Party by 402 votes, which at the time made it one of the most marginal seats in the country. However, he defected to Labour in January 2022.

On Bury Council, Prestwich is served by three wards, St Mary's, covering the western half of the town, Holyrood covering the north-east, and Sedgeley to the south. In previous years, they have been represented by all three major political parties, but since the 2023 local elections, all nine seats across the three wards are held by Labour.

=== Civic history ===
The coat of arms of the council of the former Municipal Borough of Prestwich

Historically, Prestwich was the ecclesiastical centre of Prestwich-cum-Oldham an ancient parish in the Salford Hundred of Lancashire. A Prestwich Poor Law Union was established in 1850, and later merged with the Manchester one in 1915 before being abolished in 1930.

In 1867 the Prestwich Local Board of Health was established which, as a result of the Local Government Act 1894, became Prestwich Urban District, to which parts of Great and Little Heaton townships were added. In 1903, Heaton Park was added to the City of Manchester, and in 1933, part of the urban district west of the Irwell was added to Swinton and Pendlebury Urban District. Prestwich became a municipal borough in 1939, with the council based at Prestwich Town Hall. Under the Local Government Act 1972 it became an unparished area in the Metropolitan Borough of Bury in Greater Manchester, taking effect on 1 April 1974.

== Geography ==
Prestwich lies to the east of the River Irwell and is bounded on the north by Whitefield, on the east by Heaton Park, to the west by the Prestwich Forest Park and the Irwell Valley (Agecroft and Clifton) and to the south by the City of Salford. The two main north–south roads passing from central Manchester to Bury, Bury New Road (A56) and Bury Old Road, traverse the district.

The geology of the area is characterised by carboniferous coal measures of the Manchester Coalfield and sandstone appertaining to the Carboniferous Westphalian C geological age. This is overlain with quaternary glacial drift comprising sand, gravel and boulder clay.

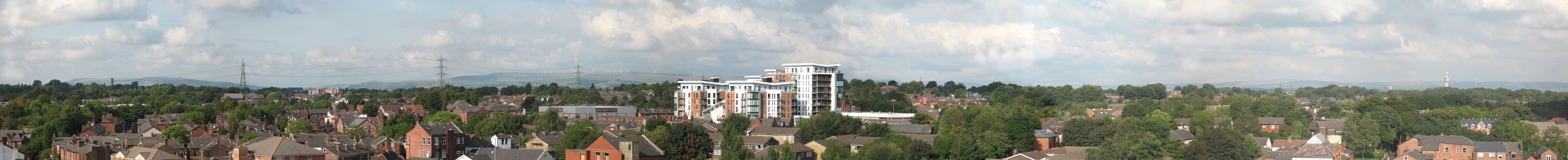
Prestwich Panorama taken from the tower of the Church of Saint Mary the Virgin, 2008

== Demography ==
The 2021 census estimated the population of Prestwich at 31,500.

=== Population change ===
Population growth in Prestwich 1881–1971
Year	1881	1891	1901	1911	1921	1931	1939	1951	1961	1971
Population	8,627	10,485	12,839	17,195	18,750	23,881	32,594	34,466	34,191	32,825
Prestwich CP/Tn

== Economy ==
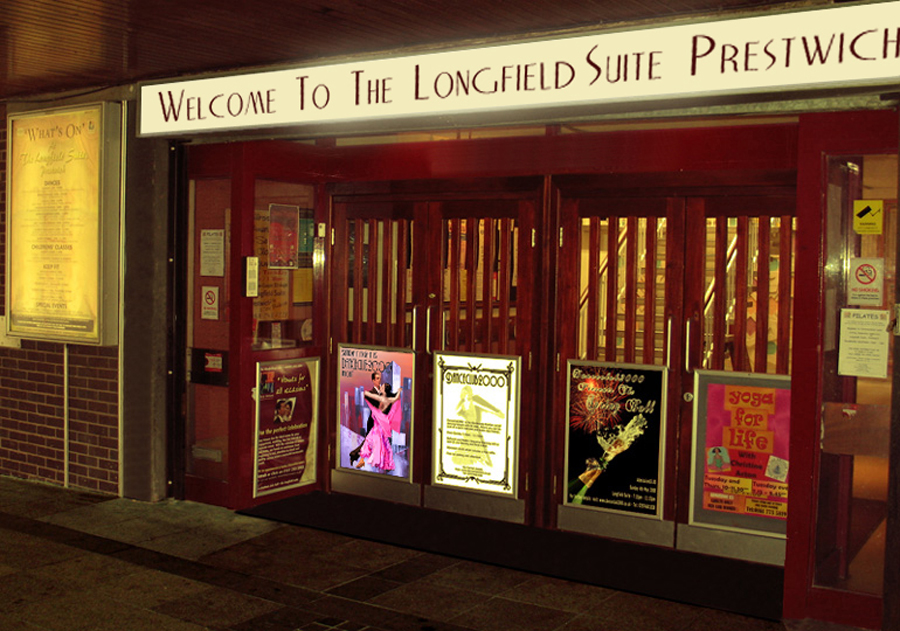
Longfield Suite main entrance, 2008

The high street of Prestwich is centred around the Longfield Centre. The centre, which includes the now-closed Longfield Suite, local library and NHS drop-in centre, is due to be "regenerated" with £100m worth of development work starting in 2024. According to the Sunday Times, the area is an "interesting mix of old and new", with various more upmarket bars and restaurants alongside traditional venues. Many of the local pubs are run by Joseph Holt, and the brewery's first cask ale festival was hosted in the Woodthorpe pub in 2023.

In the Sedgley Park area, there are a number of kosher restaurants and delis.

Prestwich is now considered to be an affluent area and has been called the "Didsbury of North Manchester".

== Transport ==
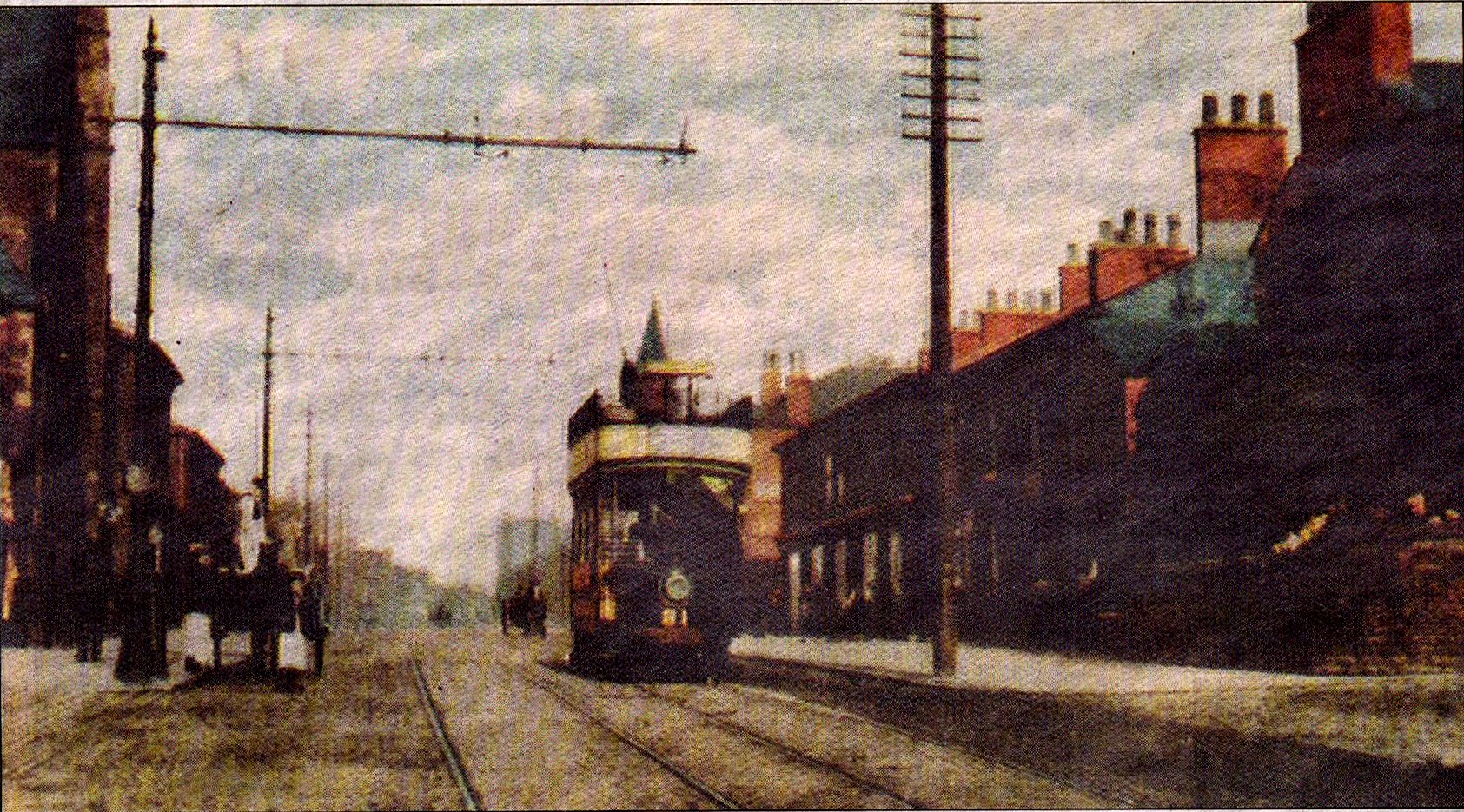
Tram to Manchester passing through Prestwich village in 1904

Public transport in Prestwich is coordinated by Transport for Greater Manchester. It has good transport links to Manchester city centre, Bury and other parts of Greater Manchester.

Prestwich is served by four tram stations on the Manchester Metrolink line from Manchester to Bury, at Besses o' th' Barn on the Whitefield border to the north, Prestwich in the centre of the village, Heaton Park in the centre-east and Bowker Vale on the Blackley border to the south-east. There are a number of parking spaces at the Besses and Prestwich, stops, however, the nearest dedicated park-and-ride station is at Whitefield with over 200 spaces. The metrolink line was originally a train line, with Prestwich station first built by Lancashire and Yorkshire Railway in 1879.

Bury New Road is the main road through the centre of the town. Buses on the road operate between Prestwich and central Manchester and Bury, with high frequency services operated by Go North West Local bus routes link the village to northern areas of Salford including Pendlebury, Swinton, Monton and Eccles. The Lancashire Way and The Witch Way express services link Prestwich to Manchester, Burnley and Pendle. The road was first constructed by a turnpike trust in 1826.

Bury New Road also intersects the M60 motorway at Junction 17, the Whitefield Interchange, a short distance north of the centre of Prestwich.

== Landmarks ==
=== Historic buildings ===
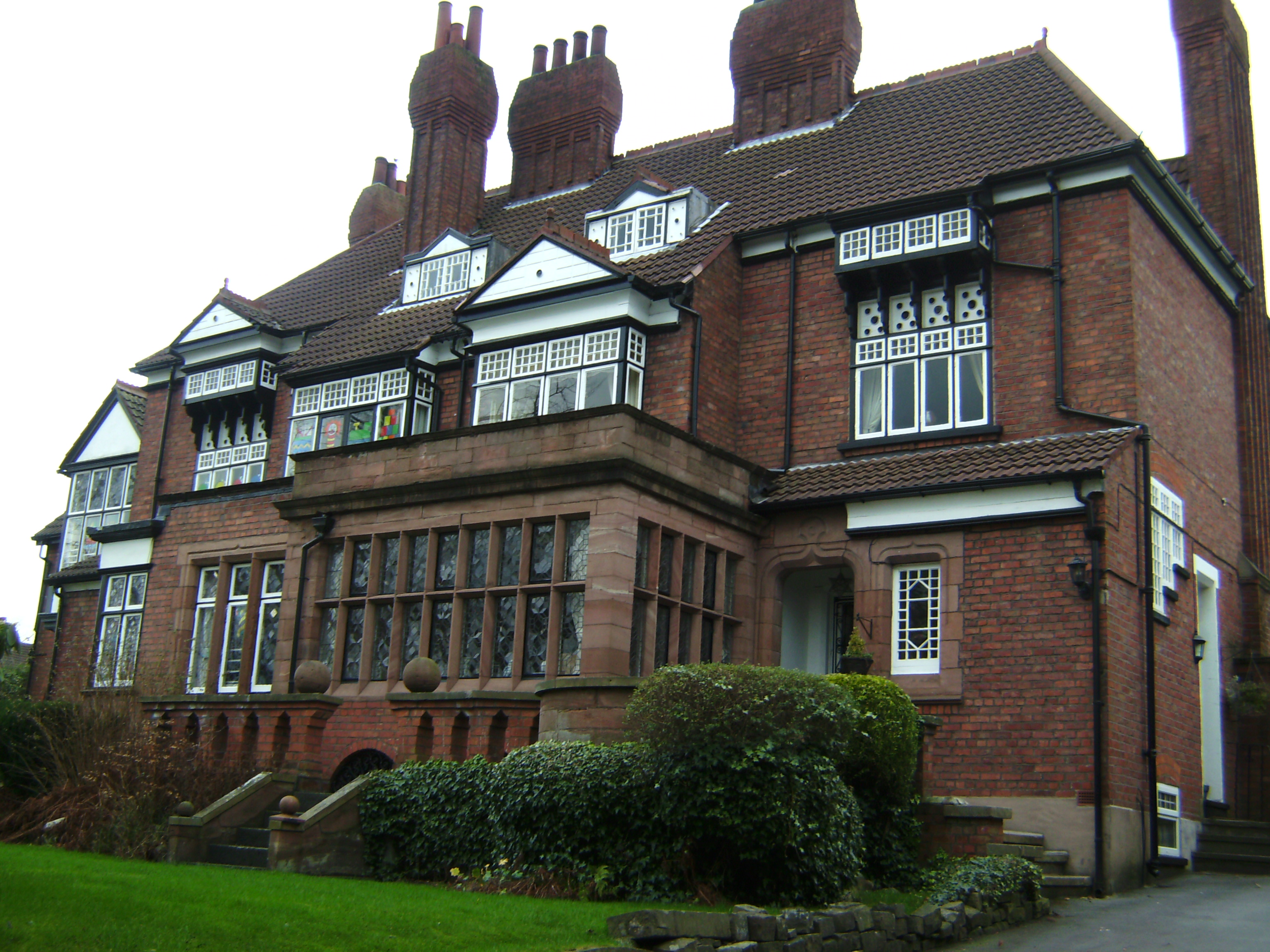
Arts and Crafts, grade II listed building on Hilton Lane, built c. 1880

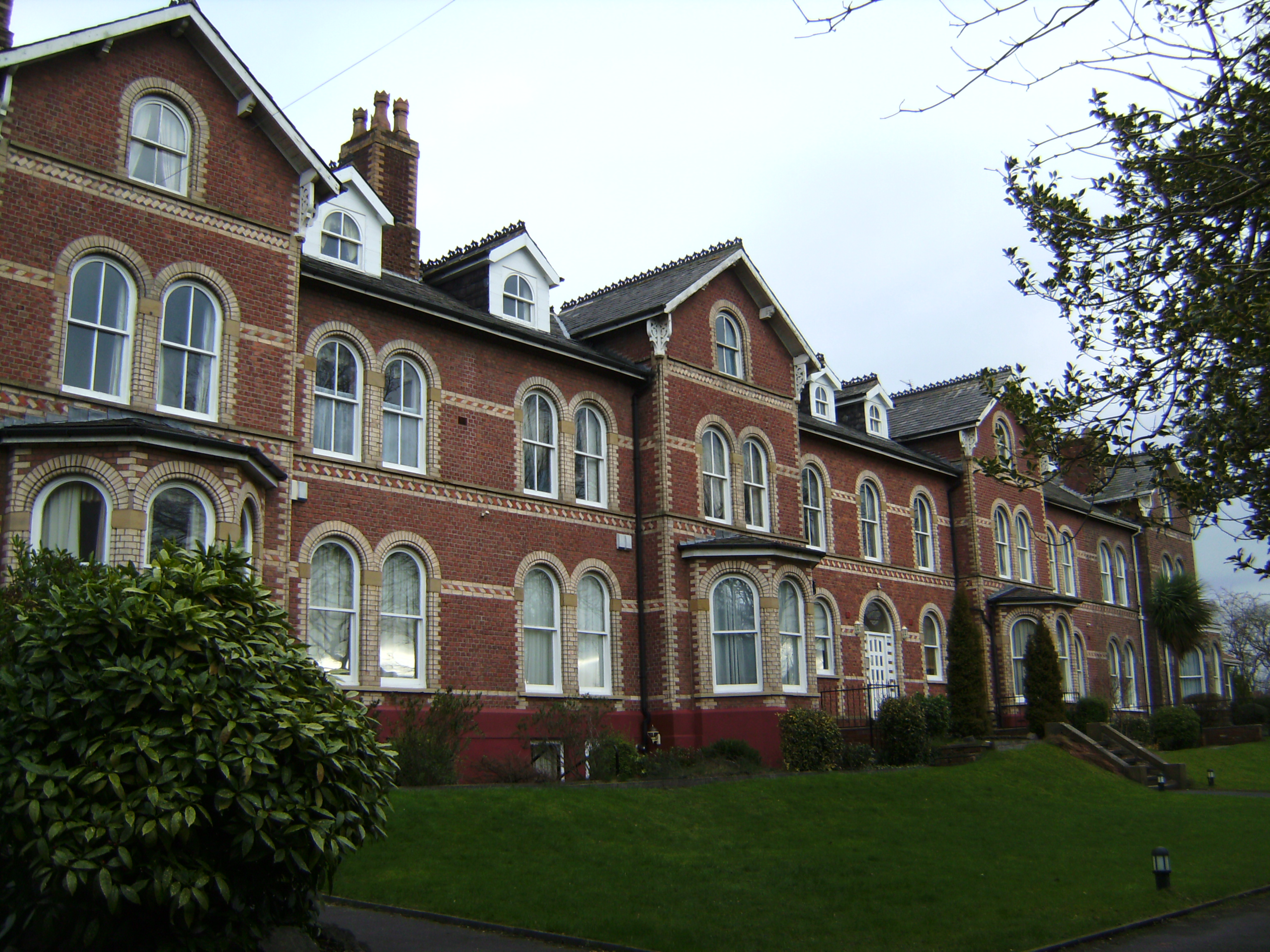
Beech Tree Bank, Rectory Lane. Renovated Victorian villas built 1881

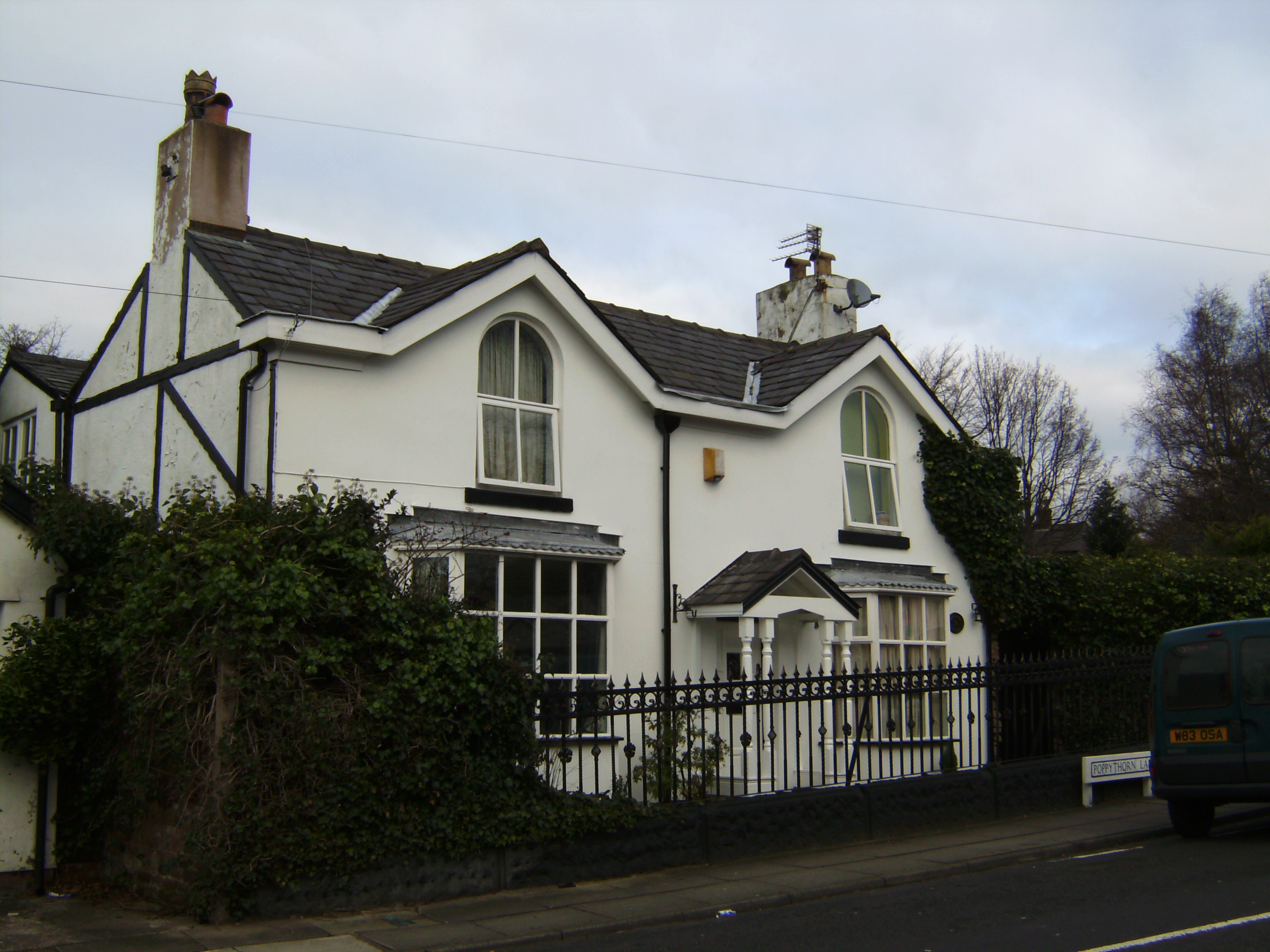
Poppythorn Cottage on Poppythorn Lane

=== Parks ===
Richard Buxton (1786–1865), a shoemaker born at Sedgley Hall Farm published a botanical guide to the plants found around the Manchester area in 1849. In the early 20th century James Cosmo Melvill wrote that Kersal Moor, Prestwich Clough, Mere Clough, the Park and Hurst Clough were the homes of most of the interesting plants. Many other noted local botanists had studied the area including Leo Grindon and Thomas Rogers.

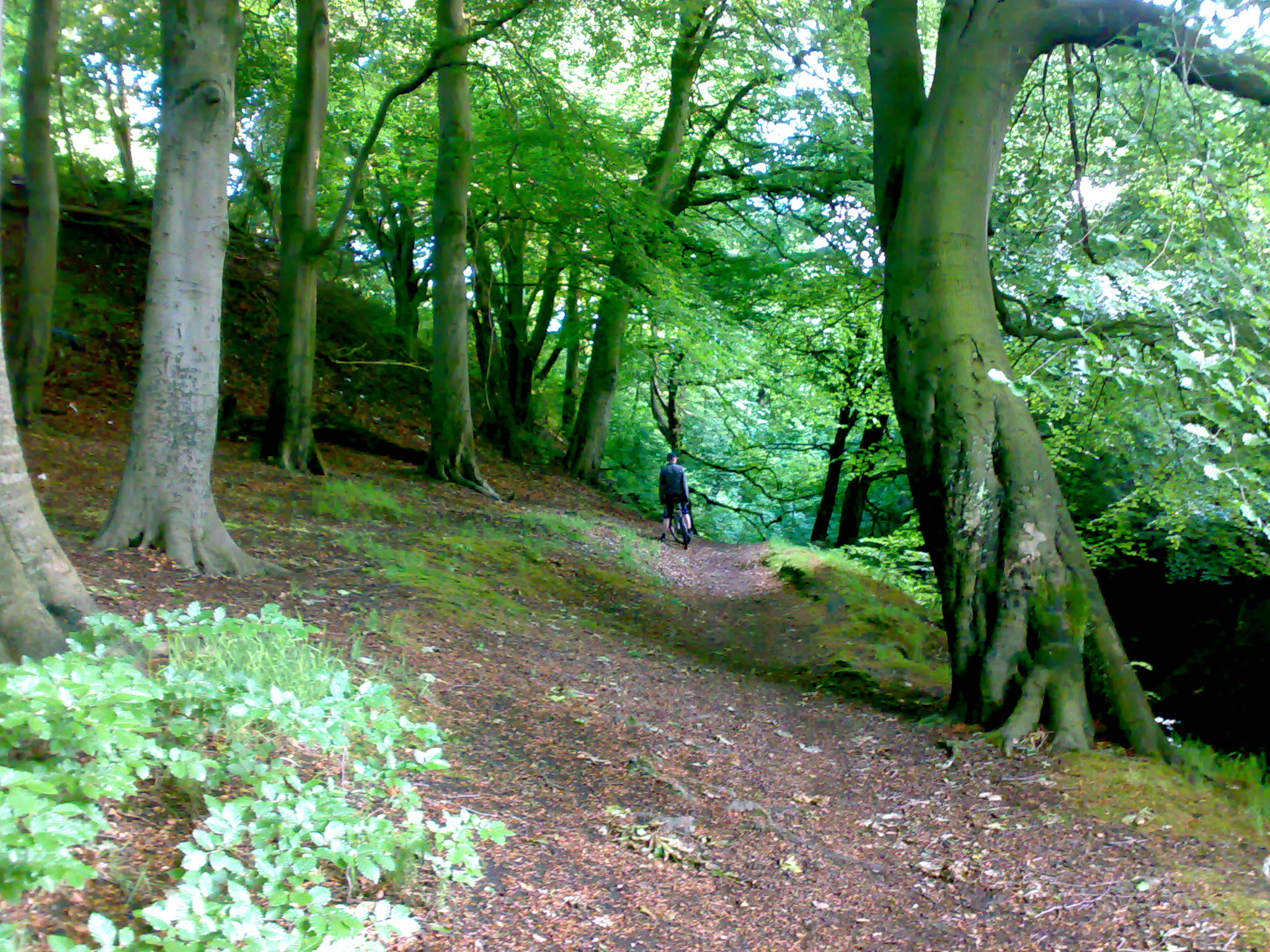
One of the trails to Mere Clough, 2008

In 1906 nine acres (3.6 hectares) of land were given to the Prestwich Urban District Council by William Gardner, a further thirteen acres (5.3 hectares) were purchased and the "sylvan and beautiful" Prestwich Clough was opened to the public as a place of recreation.

Prestwich Forest Park consists of 200 hectares (500 acres) of land on the western side of Prestwich incorporating, Philips Park, Prestwich Clough, Mere Clough, Waterdale Meadow and Drinkwater Park.

Much of the area of the park was industrialised during the 18th and 19th centuries but has been reclaimed with extensive woodlands, reservoirs and grasslands. While this area has become a haven for wildlife, there are still remnants of the area's industrial past. Philips Park has been designated as a Local Nature Reserve (LNR) and Prestwich Clough as a Site of Biological Importance (SBI) due to the important contribution they make to the wildlife heritage of Greater Manchester. The Irwell Sculpture Trail, the Irwell Valley Way and a National Cycle Route all pass through the park. The "Friends of Prestwich Forest Park" and the BTCV co-ordinate volunteer activities and events such as the Prestwich Clough Centenary Celebrations. The renovated Philips Park Barn which has become a major environmental education and countryside centre for the borough and is used by a number of local groups .

== Education ==
Prestwich has four secondary schools: The Heys School, St Monica's High School, Parrenthorn High School and Manchester Mesivta School. Two of these are faith schools, with St Monica's being Catholic and Mesivta Jewish. St Monica's featured a Sixth Form centre offering vocational courses from 2011 but the centre was closed down in 2017, so for both A-level and vocational studies the nearest tertiary education providers are both in Bury, Holy Cross College and Bury College.

== Religion ==
The Parish Church of St Mary the Virgin is a Grade I listed building and was at the centre of the ancient ecclesiastical parish of Prestwich-cum-Oldham that extended beyond the township boundaries. It is known that it had a rector by 1200. Parts of the present building date from around 1500, although extensions were made at the end of the 19th century. For a time in the 19th century, the church was referred to as St Bartholomew's. The church wakes were traditionally held around St Bartholomew's Day. The living of Prestwich was suspended by the Diocese of Manchester in 2002. A priest-in-charge, The Revd. Bryan Hackett, residing in the rectory, was appointed.

The foundation stone of St Margaret's Church was laid near Heaton Park in 1849. Founded as a chapel of ease to the parish church, it became a parish church in its own right in 1885. The church was built as a Commissioners' Church to a design by Travis & Mangnall at a cost of £2,000 and was extended in 1863, 1871, 1884, 1888 and 1899. A feature of the church is the Arts and Crafts Movement oak carved reredos, choir stalls, rood screen, panelling, pulpit, bishop's chair and altar rails by Arthur Simpson of Kendal, widely believed to be the finest collection of his ecclesiastical work. Other Anglican churches in the area include churches dedicated to St Gabriel (built 1933–4, St Hilda (1903–04) and St George (1915).

There are cemeteries at the parish church and St Margaret's.

The Roman Catholic Church had a resurgence in late Victorian times. Mass was celebrated in 1889 for the first time since the Reformation. The present Catholic church, dedicated to Our Lady of Grace, was opened in 1931 and consecrated in 1956.

There are two Methodist churches, Heaton Park Methodist Church and Prestwich Methodist Church. The Congregational Church on Bailey Street was originally based in a building designed by Alfred Waterhouse in 1864 and was joined by a school, also by Waterhouse, in 1865. In 2006, the Waterhouse church was redeveloped as flats and a new church (by Z Architecture and Design) was built on an adjacent site.

The migration of Jewish families, mainly from the nearby Cheetham area of Manchester and Broughton Park in Salford, and the later arrival of Muslims into this urban area, resulted in synagogues, such as Heaton Park Hebrew Congregation, and mosques being constructed alongside Christian places of worship. There are Jewish cemeteries at Philips Park Cemetery, Prestwich Village Cemetery was used from 1841 to 1951, and Rainsough Cemetery from 1923. According to Pevsner, the 1934 Holy Law Synagogue was the first "purpose-built" synagogue in Prestwich.

== Sport ==
The most successful Association football team representing Prestwich is Prestwich Heys A.F.C., who play in the North West Counties Football League, level nine in the English football league system. Other local teams include Prestwich F.C., Prestwich Marauders F.C., and Bury Amateurs.

Prestwich Cricket, Tennis & Bowling Club is located near Prestwich Metrolink station. It is one of the oldest clubs in the Manchester area, and was the first multi-sports club in the UK to achieve Clubmark or equivalent accreditations in all its official sporting sections. The club has cricket, crown green bowling, tennis and football facilities and a clubhouse.

Golf is played at Prestwich Golf Club, and crown green bowling in St. Mary's Park. Both are also found at the nearby Heaton Park, where the bowling greens were built for the 2002 Commonwealth Games.

== Culture and media ==
The Prestwich and Whitefield Guide and The Bury Times are sold in the locality. The Jewish Telegraph is produced and printed in Prestwich.

The Longfield Centre civic hall, which previously had one of the largest sprung floor ballrooms in the north-west of England, was permanently closed in 2021.

There are several private members' clubs in the town, including Prestwich Church Institute, the Carlton Club, and two political clubs – Prestwich Conservative Club and Prestwich Liberal Club.

== Notable people ==
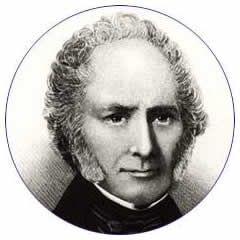
William Sturgeon, pre 1850

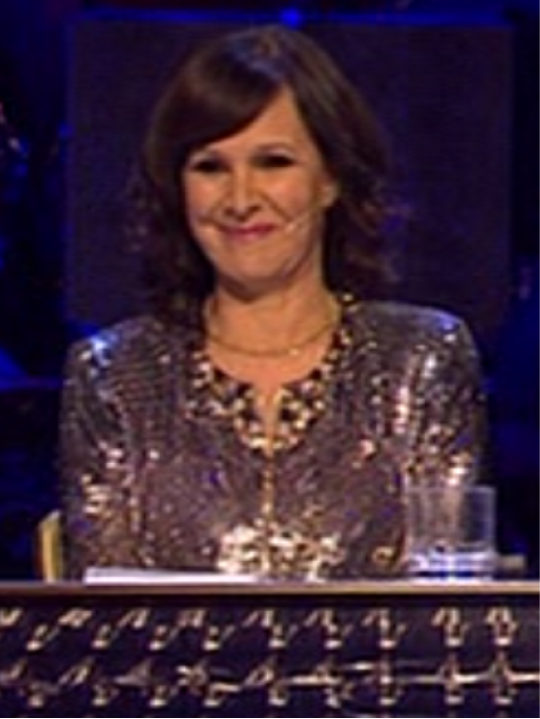
Arlene Phillips, 2009

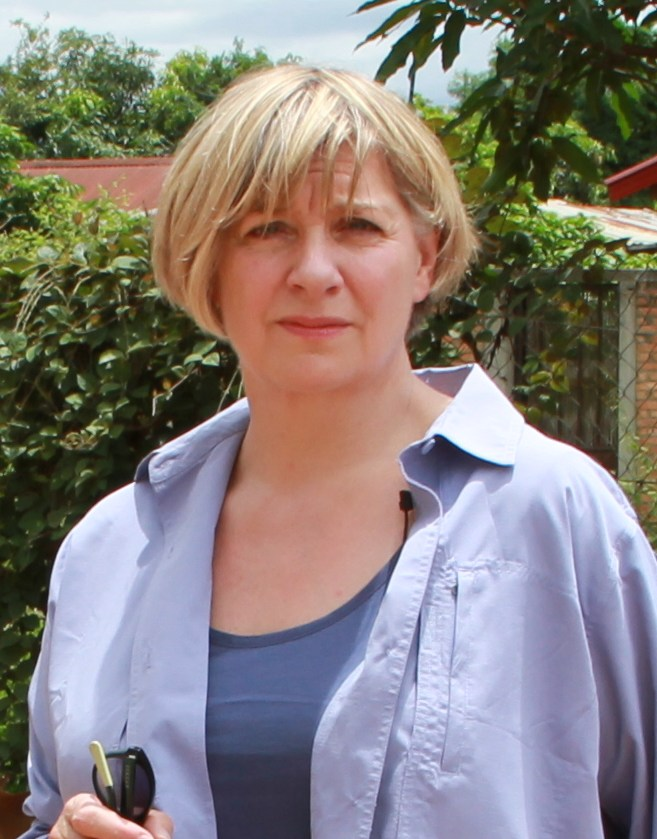
Victoria Wood, 2012

- William Sturgeon (1783–1850), electrical engineer who made the first electromagnet and the first practical electric motor, died locally.
- Richard Buxton (1785–1865), shoemaker and amateur botanist.
- Montagu Lomax (1860–1933), author of The Experiences of an Asylum Doctor, an exposé of conditions at the Prestwich Hospital between 1917 and 1919.
- Major Charles Allen (1861–1930), politician who represented Stroud from 1900 to 1918.
- Geoffrey Hutchinson, Baron Ilford (1893–1974), soldier, barrister, politician and MP for Ilford, 1937-1945
- Nancy Broadfield Parkinson (1904–1974), controller of the British Council (Home Division) during the WWII.
- Sir Robert Southern (1907–1999), general secretary of the Co-operative Union, 1950-1972.
- Dudley D. Watkins (1907–1969), cartoonist, created Oor Wullie & The Broons & drew for The Dandy comic.
- Hugh Delargy (1908–1976), politician, MP for Manchester Platting, 1945 to 1950 & Thurrock, 1950 to 1976.
- Betty Tebbs (1918–2017), campaigner for women's rights and peace, lived locally.
- Michael Mills (1919–1988), TV producer and director, BBC's Head of Comedy from 1967 until 1972.
- Henry Livings (1929–1998), playwright and actor
- Alan Haven (1935–2016), jazz organist.
- Julie Stevens (1936–2024), actress and TV presenter; appeared in episodes of TV series The Avengers, Playschool and Playaway.
- Celia Birtwell (born 1941), textile and fashion designer, muse of David Hockney, raised and schooled locally.
- Howard Jacobson (born 1942), novelist and journalist and Man Booker Prize winner, born and raised locally.
- Arlene Phillips (born 1943), choreographer, theatre director, talent scout, TV judge and dancer.
- Elkie Brooks (born 1945), rock, blues and jazz singer.
- Kevin Godley (born 1945) and Lol Creme (born 1947), from the band 10cc were both local.
- Vic Emerson (1949–2018), member of the rock band 10cc, from 1981 to 1983.
- Victoria Wood (1953–2016), comedian, actress, musician, screenwriter and director.
- Mark E. Smith (1957–2018), lyricist and vocalist with the post-punk group The Fall.
- Ivan Lewis (born 1967), politician, MP for Bury South from 1997 to 2019, as an independent from 2017.
- Guy Garvey (born 1974), lead singer of the band Elbow, lives locally.
- Jenny Frost (born 1978), TV presenter and singer with the band Atomic Kitten, grew up and schooled locally.
- Emma Jane Unsworth (born 1979), short story writer and novelist, grew up in locally.
- Liam Frost (born 1983), musician and singer, grew up in locally.

=== Sport ===
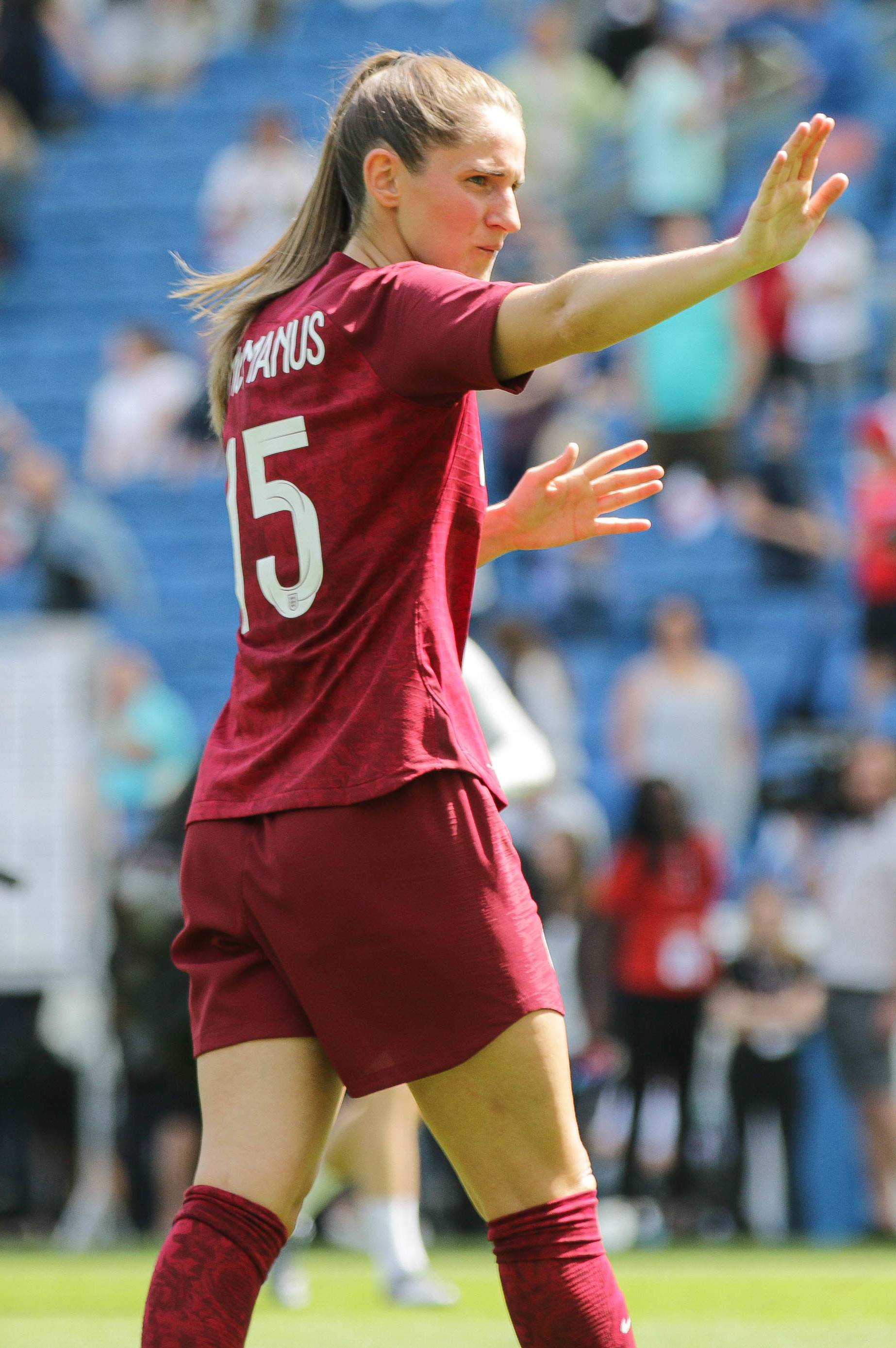
Abbie McManus, 2019

- Billy Peake (1888–1960), footballer who played 195 games including 168 for Bury
- Robert Bardsley (1890–1952), cricketer and colonial administrator; he played 31 First-class cricket matches
- Bert Leatherbarrow (1909–1983), rugby league player who played 212 games in New Zealand
- Colonel John Deighton (1920–1999), army officer and cricketer who played 35 First-class cricket matches
- Major Ralph Raffles (1920–2008), soldier, philanthropist and bobsledder, competed at the 1956 Winter Olympics
- John Aston Sr. (1921–2003), footballer who played 253 games for Manchester United & 17 for England.
- Fred Worthington (1924–1995), footballer who played 150 games including 69 for Bury
- Marc Tierney (born 1985), footballer who played 248 games.
- Scott McManus (born 1989), footballer who played 250 games for FC Halifax Town
- Abbie McManus (born 1993), footballer who played over 180 games and 18 for England women

== See also ==
- Listed buildings in Prestwich
