= Manchester Mesivta School =

Location
- Beechwood; Charlton Avenue; Prestwich; Greater Manchester, M25 0PH; England
- Coordinates: 53.52538°N 2.27684°W

Information
- Former name: Manchester Jewish Grammar School
- Type: Voluntary aided school
- Religious affiliation: Orthodox Judaism
- Local authority: Bury Council
- Department for Education URN: 134195 Tables
- Ofsted: Reports
- Chair of Governors: Avrom Topperman
- Head Teacher: Rabbi Zevi Katz
- Gender: Boys
- Age: 11 to 16
- Enrollment: 232 as of December 2022
- Website: mesivta.org.uk

Manchester Mesivta School is a Jewish secondary school for boys located in Prestwich in the English county of Greater Manchester.

It is a voluntary aided school administered by Bury Metropolitan Borough Council, but admits Orthodox Jewish boys aged 11 to 16 from all over Greater Manchester. Previously a private school, Manchester Mesivta School became voluntary-aided in 2004 and relocated to new buildings in 2005.

Manchester Mesivta School operates principally as a mesivta for pupils who wish to proceed eventually to a yeshiva, and therefore aims for pupils to achieve a high degree of proficiency in Torah studies. The school offers a Yeshiva-orientated Torah syllabus along with the National Curriculum. Secular studies lead to GCSE courses and examinations. There is also an independent sixth form provision attached to the school site.
