= Church of St Mary the Virgin, Prestwich =

Coordinates: 53.5294°N 2.2866°W

Parish Church of St Mary the Virgin, Prestwich
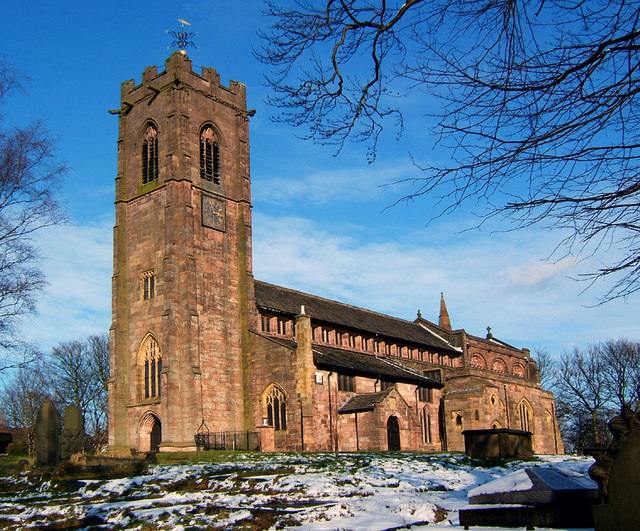
- St Mary's from the southwest

- Location in Greater Manchester
- OS grid reference: SD 811,037
- Location: Church Lane; Prestwich; Greater Manchester
- Country: England
- Denomination: Anglican
- Website: St Mary's Church Official Page

History
- Status: Parish church
- Dedication: Virgin Mary

Architecture
- Functional status: Active
- Heritage designation: Grade I
- Designated: 30 June 1966
- Architect(s): Paley, Austin and Paley (1888–89 alterations)
- Architectural type: Church
- Style: Gothic; Gothic Revival

Administration
- Province: York
- Diocese: Manchester
- Archdeaconry: Bolton
- Deanery: Radcliffe and Prestwich
- Parish: Prestwich

Clergy
- Rector: Revd David P. Cooper, BA, BTh.

The Church of St Mary the Virgin is on Church Lane, Prestwich, Greater Manchester, England. It is an active Anglican parish church in the deanery of Radcliffe and Prestwich, the archdeaconry of Bolton and the diocese of Manchester. The church is recorded in the National Heritage List for England as a designated Grade I listed building. Pevsner refers to it as "a major church".

== History ==
Prestwich is not mentioned in the Domesday Book, but there is evidence of a church on the site since at least 1200. The tower was built in about 1500 by the 1st Earl of Derby, and the body of the church was rebuilt during the early part of the 16th century. In 1756 the south porch was rebuilt and the walls of the aisles were raised. The east vestry was rebuilt in 1803 and in 1860 the chancel was extended. In 1872 a new chapel, the Birch Chapel, was added to the south of the chancel and to the east of the existing south (Lever) chapel; the Lever Chapel was rebuilt two years later. In 1888–89 the Lancaster architects Paley, Austin and Paley rebuilt the north (Wilton) chapel and the chancel, and added an organ chamber and a vestry on the north side of the chancel. The north porch dates from 1895. The north and south galleries were removed in 1959.

== Architecture ==
=== Exterior ===
The church is constructed in red sandstone with stone slate roofs. Its plan consists of a five-bay nave with a clerestory, a three-bay chancel with a clerestory rising higher than that of the nave, north and south aisles, north and south porches, and a west tower. The two eastern bays of the north aisle comprise the Wilton Chapel, the work of Paley and Austin in 1872. There is some doubt as to whether it is original Paley and Austin or a rebuild of something earlier. Of this chapel Pevsner writes "the uncusped tracery is almost convincing Henry VIII but not quite." Beyond the Wilton Chapel are the organ chamber and the choir vestry. On the south of the church the Lever Chapel occupies a corresponding position to the Wilton Chapel, and to the east of this is the Birch (or Lady) Chapel. The tower is in three stages and rises to a height of 86 feet (26 m). It has a buttress at each corner, and a stair turret in the northeast corner. In the bottom stage is a doorway above which is a three-light window. In the middle stage on the west side is a two-light square-headed window. At a higher level in this stage are clock faces on the north, south and east sides. A reference in the churchwarden's accounts notes that there was a clock in the tower in 1656. The top stage contains a three-light louvred bell opening on each side, and above them a string course with gargoyles. At the top of the tower is an embattled parapet, and it is surmounted by a pyramidal roof with a weathervane. Both aisles have two cusped, tracery-less, three-light windows and above them are three three-light square-headed, mullioned windows. At the west end of the north aisle is a Decorated two-light window, and at the west end of the south aisle the window has three lights. The clerestory has a range of two-light square-headed windows on each side. The Lever chapel has two four-light windows, and in the Wilton chapel are three three-light windows. The east window of the chancel has seven lights and contains Perpendicular tracery. The south porch is dated 1756.

=== Interior ===
The arcades are carried on tall octagonal piers mostly without capitals. The roof is coffered and contains carved bosses; although much restored, it still contains some 16th century timber. The chancel is floored in polychromatic marble. The stone reredos is a memorial to a child who died at the age of eight from scarlet fever in 1863. The altar rails, the stalls, the screen and the pulpit were designed by Paley, Austin and Paley. The organ screen is a memorial to the First World War and wings were added to it to commemorate the Second World War. Also in the church is a chandelier given to the church in 1701, incorporating an eagle and child, the symbol of the Earls of Derby. The stained glass in the east window is by Ward and Hughes, and dates from 1861. During the 1888–89 rebuilding of the chancel, the glass was altered and installed in the new window. There is stained glass by the same makers in the Lady Chapel, dated 1876, and in the tower, dating from 1884. In the Wilton Chapel is glass by Clayton and Bell dating from 1890 to 1892. In the chancel and in the organ chamber are windows by Shrigley and Hunt dated between 1904 and 1927. The finest monument in the church is one dated 1833 by Sievier to the memory of a rector, Rev'd James Lyon, who had been the incumbent for 50 years. Also in the church are memorials to two members of the Grey Egerton family, who died respectively in 1743 and 1756, and to Sir Ashton Lever of Alkrington Hall, who died in 1788. In the chancel is a brass dated 1634.

=== Organ and bells ===
The original two manual organ was built by Renn and Boston in 1825 but was moved to St Matthew's, Preston, in 1891. It was replaced in 1889 by a new organ built by the Belgian firm of Anneesens. This was given by the 4th Earl of Wilton and cost £1,000 (equivalent to £110,000 in 2025). By 1901, the organ had become unplayable and it was replaced by a three-manual organ by Abbott and Smith. This too was replaced in 1964 by an organ made by J. W. Walker, using some of the pipes from the previous organ. In 2006 this organ was restored and rebuilt by Principal Pipe Organs of York.

Originally there was a ring of four bells. These were recast into five bells in 1721 by Abraham Rudhall, who added a sixth bell at the same time. These were all replaced in the 20th century by a ring of eight bells, all cast by John Taylor, two of them in 1910 and the rest in 1919.

In 1999, to celebrate the Millennium, the bells were fitted with additional electromagnetic hammers so that they could be tolled automatically. This work was carried out by Gunning & Kavanagh, Co. Down and was designed to allow the bells to be pealed using the ropes.

== Churchyard ==
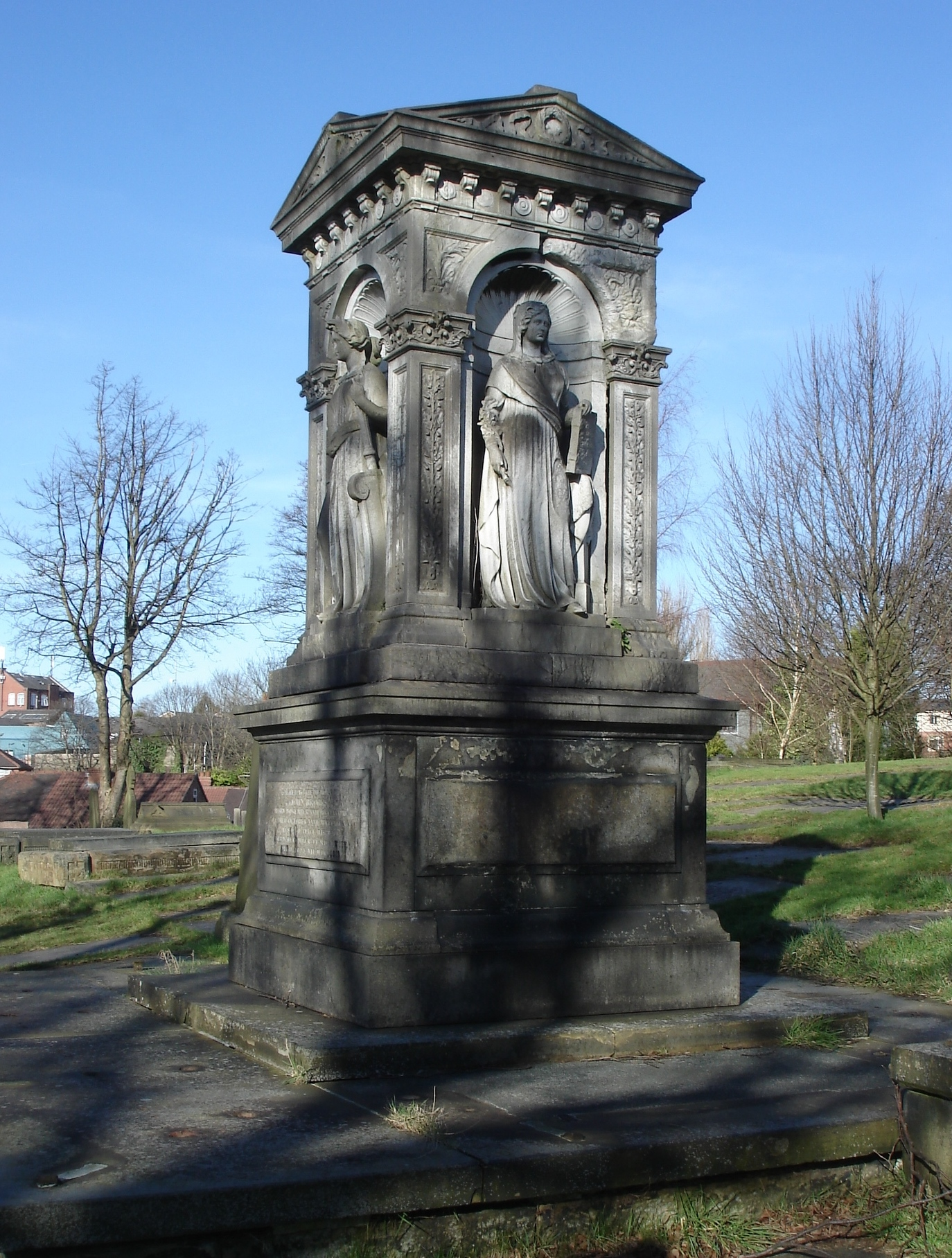
Monument to John Brooks

The churchyard dates to the 14th century but has been extended many times, including in 1827 (when the yard was enclosed), 1864, 1886, 1924 and 1950.

The western section of the churchyard contains the burial plots of more than 5,000 inmates of the Prestwich County Asylum (later Prestwich Hospital – at one time Europe's largest psychiatric hospital), dating from 1851 to 1968. Several graves for the asylum's attendants, and a small number for inmates, are marked by grave slabs, but the majority are unmarked communal graves. In 2006 a memorial was erected to mark these graves, funded by parishioners with assistance from the Prestwich Area Board and the Salford, Trafford and Bolton NHS Mental Health Trust. The memorial is made of ruby-grey Welsh slate and was consecrated by David Gillett, the Bishop of Bolton.

The churchyard contains the Grade II* listed funerary monument to John Brooks (1788–1849) of Crawshaw Hall, the son of cotton entrepreneur and banker William Brooks. The monument was sculpted by John Thomas and cost approximately £3,000. John Brooks was a partner in the calico-printing firm of Cunliffe & Brooks who had a mill near Blackburn. He was also Secretary of the Anti-Corn Law League and a philanthropist.

The monument comprises a panelled granite pedestal set upon a large square stone plinth and was originally enclosed by railings, which were removed as part of the war effort during the Second World War. Above it is a square aedicule of Sicilian marble with niches on each face framed by decorated piers, each containing a life-size carved female figure in classical dress. Each face is pedimented with a bracketed cornice beneath, interspersed with carved medallions.

The north face contains the figure "Industry", depicted with a wheel; the west face the figure "Commerce", depicted with bales of cotton or calico; the east face the figure "Charity", depicted with babes in arms; and the south face the figure "Integrity", depicted holding a book. Carved decorations to the piers and spandrels include depictions of cotton and flax plants, roses, poppies, and oak and laurel leaves. The figure of Charity was exhibited at the Great Exhibition of 1851.

In the churchyard are 48 war graves of service personnel: 29 from World War I and 19 from World War II. The graves include servicemen from:

- the Corps of Military Police
- the East Lancashire Regiment
- the King's Regiment (Liverpool)
- the Labour Corps
- the Lancashire Fusiliers
- the London Regiment
- the Loyal North Lancashire Regiment
- the Manchester Regiment
- the RAF
- the RAFVR
- the Royal Armoured Corps
- the Royal Army Service Corps
- the Royal Canadian Infantry Corps
- the Royal Corps of Signals
- the Royal Engineers
- the Royal Inniskilling Fusiliers
- the Royal Navy
- the RNVR
- the Royal Pioneer Corps
- the Royal Scots (1917)
- the Sherwood Foresters
- the South Wales Borderers

and one servicewoman from the Auxiliary Territorial Service.

The churchyard is the resting place of Sir William Fairbairn Bt, Sir William Mather and William Sturgeon. Three noted botanists, Richard Buxton, John Horsefield and James Percival are buried in one corner of the churchyard.

Other notable plots include:

Plot	Burial	Notes	Listing	Listed
Ashworth grave slab	Katherine Ashworth and her children	An increasingly rare survival of a 17th-century grave slab with an original inscription that remains fully legible.	II	2012
Barlowe grave slab	George Barlowe and family c.1686	An increasingly rare survival of a 17th-century grave slab with an original inscription that remains fully legible, and it has additional interest in incorporating an unusual epitaph. The grave slab was re-used by the same family in the 18th and 19th centuries, and its inscriptions demonstrate how the spelling of the family name changes over time; the original 17th-century surname of 'Barlowe' later becoming 'Barlow'.	II	2012
Collier grave slab	The children of Thomas Collier (died 1641)	A simple flat slab with an inscription in capitals; this is the oldest extant grave marker in the churchyard.	II	1985
Grimshaw grave slab	James Grimshaw and family c. 1686	An increasingly rare survival of a 17th-century grave slab with an original inscription that remains fully legible. The slab incorporates an original incised scrolled fleur-de-lys motif and a verse added in the 18th century following the grave's re-use by the same family.	II	2012
Hardman grave slab	Ralph Hardman and his daughter c. 1695, re-used in the early 20th century	An increasingly rare survival of a 17th-century grave slab with an original inscription that remains fully legible. The foot of the grave slab incorporates an unusual incised carving of a 'Green Man' style face set within a scrolled motif.	II	2012
Holland grave slab	Margaret Holland and her daughter c. 1687	An increasingly rare survival of a 17th-century grave slab with an original inscription that remains fully legible. It incorporates a large, stylised fleur-de-lys motif to the foot of the slab.	II	2012
Hollinshed memorial	Memorial to Lawrence Brock Hollinshed (d. 1839)	Gothic in style, it is a very tall oblong chest-tomb with decorated panels and a concave peaked roof with crockets on the ridges extending up to similar finial.	II	1985
Horsefield table tomb	John Horsefield and his family c. 1854	It commemorates the regionally significant botanist, John Horsefield, a gingham weaver who strove to enable working-men to develop their knowledge of botany, which was seen at the time as the preserve of the gentleman. The table tomb incorporates richly detailed carvings that directly reference Horsefield's life, including a striking epitaph by the poet Charles Swain, and a depiction of a 'Trigridia conchiflora var. Watkinsoni', one of the flowers that Horsefield hybridised.	II	2012
James Lancashire grave slab	James Lancashire and his family c. 1737	High quality decoration, including an italicised cursive inscription, a crenellated and arched band to the head of the slab, and an unusual carved depiction of an angel's head with outstretched wings.	II	2012
Mary Lancashire grave slab	Mary Lancashire and family c. 1672	An increasingly rare survival of a 17th-century grave slab with an original inscription that remains fully legible.	II	2012
Ramsbotham grave slab	Edmund Ramsbotham c. 1697, later inscriptions added in the 19th century.	An increasingly rare survival of a 17th-century grave slab with an original inscription that remains fully legible. The grave slab was re-used by the same family in the 19th century and its inscriptions demonstrate how family names change and develop over time; the original 17th-century surname of 'Romsbotham' becoming 'Ramsbotham' by the 19th century.	II	2012
Scholefeild grave slab	James Scholefeild and Thomas Scholes c. 1670, re-used by another family in the 18th century.	An increasingly rare survival of a 17th-century grave slab with an original inscription that remains fully legible and decorative incised carvings.	II	2012
Sturgeon grave slab	William Sturgeon and his family	It commemorates the electrical engineer, William Sturgeon, a highly significant figure who produced numerous internationally important inventions in the early-mid 19th century, including the world's first electro-magnet, the first practical electric motor, and the commutator. He also further developed the galvanometer and Alessandro Volta's voltaic battery. The slab's unusually modest design reflects the fact that despite his numerous inventions and scientific work, Sturgeon lived in poverty throughout his life. The slab's inscription makes unique reference to Sturgeon's work as an electrical engineer, calling him The Electrician.	II	2012
Travis grave slab	John Travis c. 1675, re-used in the 18th and 19th centuries by the Bowker family	An increasingly rare survival of a 17th-century grave slab with an original inscription that remains fully legible.	II	2012

The churchyard contains several other important structures. These include the gate piers of c. 1827 and the boundary walls of 1827 and 1886 enclosing the churchyard to north, east and south sides (Grade II, 1985), the 18th-century three-step monolithic sandstone mounting block (Grade II, 1985), and a section of boundary wall to the north of the churchyard with an oval inscription (Grade II, 1985) All are listed monuments, as is the sundial to the south of the church (Grade II, 1985).

The 1801 hearse house adjacent to the Church Inn was listed Grade II in 2012 as an important survival of a late Georgian hearse house with a design that rises above the purely functional. Despite some later alterations, it retains many original features, including its stone-sett floors and a timber ledger cupboard. A 1668 tomb crest and a medieval tomb slab with incised decoration are built into the interior walls.

Most unusual among the listed monuments in the churchyard is a triangular stone measuring about 4 by 4 feet (1.2 m × 1.2 m) and approximately 5 inches (13 cm) thick, inscribed:

The Proprietor of this Estate having been at a serious expence in altering and improving the Roads leading to this Church particularly desires the Publick to keep off the Grass 1827.

It was listed as a Grade II monument in 1985.

== See also ==
- List of churches in Greater Manchester
- Grade I listed churches in Greater Manchester
- Grade I listed buildings in Greater Manchester
- Listed buildings in Prestwich
- List of works by Paley, Austin and Paley
- List of ecclesiastical works by Paley and Austin
