= Parrenthorn High School =

Location
- Heywood Road; Prestwich; Greater Manchester, M25 2BW; England; 53.545074°N 2.262894°W

Information
- Type: Community school
- Established: 1974
- Local authority: Bury Council
- Department for Education URN: 105358 Tables
- Ofsted: Reports
- Chair of Governors: Christina Critchley
- Headteacher: Christopher Bell
- Gender: Coeducational
- Age: 11 to 16
- Enrolment: 898 (2019)
- Houses: Da Cocodia Turing Dalton Pankhurst
- Colour
- Website: http://www.parrenthorn.co.uk/

Parrenthorn High School is a comprehensive school located in Prestwich in the English county of Greater Manchester. The school was rated "Good" in all categories in its 2023 Ofsted inspection. The head teacher is Mr C. Bell, replacing Mr M. Fitzgerald who retired in 2016 after 12 years in post.

== The School ==
Parrenthorn is a coeducational community school with technology college status and is administered by Bury Metropolitan Borough Council. Established in 1974, the school underwent a major rebuild and refurbishment in 2009. An additional building extension was completed in 2013 and another one was completed in 2018.

School uniform comprises a black blazer with school crest, white shirt with black or grey trousers or skirt and black shoes.

== Curriculum ==
Parrenthorn High School offers GCSEs and OCR Nationals. Core subjects in Key Stage 3 are English Language and Literature, maths, science, RE and PE, with most pupils also studying a modern foreign language and either history or geography. Optional subjects include drama, DT, computer science and music.

== Sport ==
Set amid extensive playing fields, the school has a sports hall and gymnasium, as well as netball and basketball courts and an Astroturf pitch. Sports (both within the PE syllabus and as extracurricular activities) include athletics, badminton, basketball, cricket, cross country, hockey, netball, rounders, soccer and trampolining.
