= The Experiences of an Asylum Doctor =

1921 non-fiction book by Montagu Lomax

The Experiences of an Asylum Doctor, with suggestions for asylum and lunacy law reform
- Title page for The Experiences of an Asylum Doctor, with suggestions for asylum and lunacy law reform (1921)
- Author: Montagu Lomax
- Language: English
- Publisher: George Allen & Unwin
- Publication date: 1921
- Publication place: United Kingdom
- Pages: 255
- OCLC: 21918473

The Experiences of an Asylum Doctor, with suggestions for asylum and lunacy law reform is a 1921 book written by British general practitioner Montagu Lomax (1860–1933). The book was an exposé of conditions within two English lunatic asylums based on Lomax's experiences as an Asylum medical officer between 1917 and 1919.

The book became a cause célèbre. The national press was outraged by Lomax’s revelations, with The Times publishing an article entitled "Asylum Horrors - A Doctors Indictment". Within ten days of the book’s publication, questions were being asked in Parliament. Whilst many attempts at asylum reform had been made previously, it was Lomax’s book and the associated newspaper articles that alerted public opinion on a wide scale. The Ministry of Health decided to use Lomax’s book to start the process of lunacy reform, and to subsume the mental health services, previously managed by the Board of Control. The Lomax affair was a significant prelude to the 1926 Royal Commission on Lunacy and Mental Disorder. The recommendations of the Royal Commission were incorporated into the Mental Treatment Act 1930 which opened the way to many developments in mental health services over the next thirty years. Nonetheless, much of what Lomax described could still be seen in parts of Prestwich Hospital in the 1960s and 1970s.

The book ensured Lomax a place in the tradition of British social reportage. It was an important book because it directed public attention to the defects of the Asylum system which had hitherto been taken on trust. Lomax’s vivid descriptions of patients' behaviour and mental state in asylums and of the institutional process produced insights which were to be rediscovered 30 years later by researchers who themselves went on to influence mental health care from 1959 onwards.
