= Billy Peake =

English footballer (1888–1960)

Personal information
- Full name: William Edward Peake
- Date of birth: 1888
- Place of birth: Prestwich, England
- Date of death: 1960 (aged 71–72)
- Height: 5 ft 10 1/2 in (1.79 m)
- Position: Inside forward

Senior career*
Years	Team	Apps	(Gls)
1904–1905	St Thomas's (Lower Crumpsall)		
1905–1906	Alms Hill		
1906–1907	St John's College (Battersea)		
1907–1908	Northern Nomads		
1908–1909	Eccles Borough		
1909–1912	Sheffield United	27	(6)
1912–1922	Bury	168	(35)
1922	Newcross		
1922	Caerphilly		
1923	Macclesfield		
1924	Manchester North End		
Total		195	(41)
- * Club domestic league appearances and goals

William Edward Peake (1888–1960) was an English footballer who played in the Football League for Bury and Sheffield United.
