= The Heys School =

Location
- Heys Road; Prestwich, Greater Manchester, M25 1JZ; England; 53.5347°N 2.2776°W

Information
- Type: Academy
- Established: 1936
- Local authority: Bury
- Trust: The Rowan Learning Trust
- Department for Education URN: 147883 Tables
- Ofsted: Reports
- Chair of local governing body: Imelda McLaughlin
- Head Teacher: Paul McKendrick
- Gender: Coeducational
- Age: 11 to 16
- Enrolment: 858
- Website: https://theheys.school/

The Heys School is a coeducational secondary school located in Prestwich, Greater Manchester, England.

== History ==
The school opened as Heys Road School for Boys in 1936 and was used for treating wounded soldiers during the Second World War. It merged with Hope Park Girls' School, also in Prestwich, in 1979, becoming Prestwich High School. The new block was opened in 1981, and includes a sports hall, science rooms, and art and woodwork rooms. In 2002, a new humanities block was opened. The school later became Prestwich Community High School and, upon receiving specialist arts status in 2004, Prestwich Arts College.

Throughout 2006, along with several other schools in the Bury borough, it had been under a sustained threat of closure. It was believed that there would be 2,000 fewer high school pupils in Bury by 2015, so Bury Council wanted to close two high schools in the borough. On 18 July 2007, the threat of closure was thrown out by the School's Organisation Committee.

Since then the number of students at the school has grown, and in 2010 the school underwent a major refurbishment, including provision of a new dining hall, Apple Creative Media Suite and an auditorium known as 'The Paragon' to support its performing arts status and which can be hired by external organisations outside of school hours.

The school's close proximity to the Metrolink station means that it attracts many students from outside Prestwich/the Bury local authority, with sizeable numbers of pupils coming from Blackley, Crumpsall and Cheetham Hill in the Manchester Council area.

As a result Ofsted described the school in its October 2014 Inspection Report as:

Prestwich Arts College is a smaller than average sized secondary school. The proportions of students who are disadvantaged and therefore eligible for the pupil premium is higher than average. (The pupil premium funding is additional funding for those pupils eligible for free school meals and those children who are looked after by the local authority.) Most students are representative of minority ethnic groups and a much larger proportion than seen nationally speak English as an additional language. A broadly average proportion of disabled students and those with special educational needs are supported at school action. The proportion supported by school action plus or with a statement of educational needs is broadly average also. The school meets the government’s floor standards, which are the minimum levels expected for students' attainment and progress.

As of 2019, the Ofsted rated the school as Inadequate with a part of the report saying:

"This school has not provided pupils with a good quality of education for some time. A lack of urgency in tackling areas for improvement, coupled with weaknesses in governance, means that the school’s effectiveness has declined further since the previous inspection. Inadequate teaching has led to pupils’ weak achievement across a range of subjects. The standard of education at Prestwich is not acceptable."

Since 2018, the school has severely under-performed. Behaviour continues to be poor and attainment (especially in maths) is well below national average. The gap is particularly bad for students who are generally high achievers. This has resulted in the school being forced to turn into an academy by mid 2020, despite an opposition campaign against the academisation being mounted by former student Joshua Harcup.

Previously a community school administered by Bury Metropolitan Borough Council, on 1 June 2020 Prestwich Arts College was forced into academy status and was renamed The Heys School, despite an opposition campaign to the academisation calling for the academisation process to be delayed until the coronavirus pandemic had ended. The school is now sponsored by The Rowan Learning Trust.

== Notable former pupils ==
- Chris Makin (born 1973), retired Sunderland A.F.C defender
- Martin Bramah (born 1957), musician
- Ellie Paskell (born 1986), actress, Waterloo Road
