= Thomas Thorp (scientific instrument manufacturer) =

English manufacturer of scientific instruments (1850–1914)

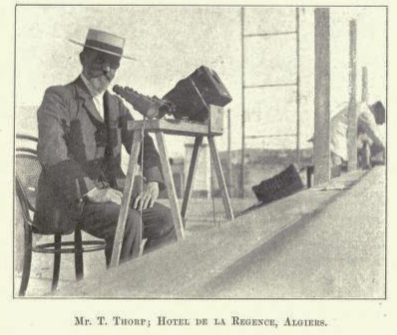
Thomas Thorp in Algiers, May 1900

Thomas Thorp (1850–1914) was an English manufacturer of scientific instruments credited with inventing the first practical coin-in-the-slot gas meter, with innovations in the field of photography, including that involving colour, and for producing an early example of what has since been developed into the modern spectrohelioscope. He began his working life as an apprentice to a firm of architects and ended it as a Fellow of the Royal Astronomical Society, having had a keen interest in astronomy since childhood.

== Early life ==
Thomas Thorp was born on 26 October 1850, the son of a farmer who worked land around Narrow Lane (now known as Victoria Avenue), Besses o' th' Barn, Whitefield, Lancashire. He was educated first at the local Park Lane School and subsequently at Manchester Grammar School, following which he was apprenticed to Maycock and Bell, a firm of architects and surveyors in Manchester. During his apprenticeship, he had a role in the town-planning of New Brighton, which was then rising as a Victorian resort town. He had an interest in the practical application of scientific knowledge, as did his inventive father, and a consequence of this trait was an inclination towards civil and mechanical engineering. Later in life Thorp was to be the appointed engineer for both the Local Board of Whitefield and also its District Council.

== Engineering ==
As early as 1872, while still working for Maycock and Bell, he was sole patentee of a mechanism for tap valves. In 1875, he was jointly named with A. P. Bell, architect, on a patent application regarding improvements to the automation of gas lighting, and continued to design items for the gas industry thereafter. In 1880 he established a business for the manufacture of his designs, originally known as Thomas Thorp & Co., with premises at Narrow Lane, Whitefield.

One significant innovation was the design, patented in 1889, for the first practical mechanism that allowed gas to be dispensed by insertion of a penny into a meter, an early point-of-use prepayment system. (Note: There had been previous successful patent applications for coin-in-the-slot metering by John Stewart Wallace and by Rowland William Brownhill (both in 1887) but neither mechanism proved to be practical.) Although frequently attributed as being his invention alone, the patent was jointly held with Thomas Gardiner Marsh. The device was a major advance and, for example, the Manchester Institution of the Association of Gas Engineers and Manufacturers reported in 1898 that

The consumption of gas has been greatly increased by the introduction of coin meters among the working class, who previously had rarely burned gas, and who but for the introduction of this class of meter, never would have done so. To people of this class, a supply of gas by coin meters is a great boon, and much appreciated. It is very much safer than lighting by oil, which it is rapidly superseding; and the cost in most cases is less. (Note: A paper presented to the Manchester Association of Engineers noted disincentives regarding the use of gas included that consumption was billed quarterly, and thus gave the appearance of being a large sum, and that gas suppliers required customers to lodge a deposit that was refunded only when consumption ceased. Prepayment meters resolved these issues.)

Despite its practicality, the meter design of Thorp and Marsh was rapidly superseded and by 1894 J. Nasmith was reporting that it was "practically out of the running". The Edinburgh-based William Cowan and the Manchester business of Sawyer and Purves were among those who had been granted patents for improvements to the mechanism by that time.

Around the same time, Thorp and Marsh were among the many people experimenting with the possibilities of using acetylene gas as an alternate to coal gas. Acetylene – produced by mixing calcium carbide and water – was thought to produce a better quality of light but there were practical difficulties to overcome. They discovered that adding the carbide to the water was less dangerous than adding the water to the carbide, and they surmounted problems related to gradual "choking" of the burners when in use by mixing air with the product. They also invented a safety valve that they claimed cut off the burner outlet in the not unusual event that the supply to it was interrupted, thus preventing unlit gas from being emitted when the supply was restored. This valve was capable of use in both acetylene and coal gas installations.

Thorp also invented the rotary gas meter in 1902, and, what his obituary describes as "a tiny device ... for economical regulation of gas delivery [that] has been very widely employed by manufacturers and public authorities." Other inventions included a push-tap for water and improvements to gas lamps and pneumatic tools.

Thorp retired from business at the age of 50 to devote more time to his scientific studies. An advertisement of 1906 shows Marsh as chairman of the Manchester-based Rotary Meter Company Ltd and director of a similarly named business in New York. The latter had bought the sole US and Canadian manufacturing rights for all products regarding which Thorp held or might in future hold US patents.

== Scientific instruments ==
Thorp was a "scientific and mechanical genius". In pursuit of his childhood interest in astronomy, he developed considerable skills in the manufacture of optical glass and both reflector and refractor telescopes. He also created celluloid diffraction grating replicas, polarising solar eyepieces and prominence spectroscopes that were widely used, as well as objective prisms. His high resolution diffracting grating replicas were significant advances of the ideas developed by Henry Rowland, whilst his multi-slit spectroscope was the first to enable the showing of both celestial and terrestrial objects and has formed the basis for the present day spectrohelioscope. Father Aloysius Cortie, of Stonyhurst College, Lancashire, was one whom achieved good results from an example of the objective prisms. Eventually owning houses in Whitefield (Note: Thorp's Whitefield house was called Moss Bank, on Knowsley Street; and that in Prestatyn was The Uplands.As of 2012 both still exist.) and also in Prestatyn, North Wales, he constructed observatories at each of these and favoured the 8 inches (200 mm) Cooke equatorial telescope for his own observations. This device was fitted with a photo-visual objective, a spectroscope and other attachments that enabled it to be used for photography.

Thorp's innovative design for celluloid diffraction grating replicas won him the Wilde Premium for Original Research in 1901, principally in recognition of his paper of 1899 entitled Grating Films and their application to Colour Photography. He was also recognised by awards from other bodies, including international exhibitions. His diffraction gratings were particularly noted in an obituary, which said that they made

... the study of spectroscopic astrophysics possible to so many lovers of the science. In addition to putting these on the market at a moderate price, he was most lavish in his generous distribution of them to professional and amateur workers throughout the world.

Prior to his developments, details of which he published but did not patent, interested people had to rely upon the photographic methods that had been proposed by Lord Rayleigh and Izarn. Thorp's "brilliant idea", announced in 1898 and improved thereafter through experimentation and the development of new materials, was to take "a cast of the ruled surface in a transparent medium [comprising] a thin solution of celluloid in amyl acetate." He described his method on numerous occasions, including in a letter published in the edition of 29 December 1905 of the British Journal of Photography (reproduced in Popular Astronomy, 1906), He emphasised the need for a dust-free environment and a uniform drying of the solution as well as asserting that his was the "first method of producing optically useful replicas of gratings and one which after all has not in my opinion been superseded." By 1900 he was able to apply his developments to colour photography and he went on to demonstrate to the British Astronomical Association a method for projecting natural colours that used "three replicas adjusted to diffract the proper colour sensations to the eye".

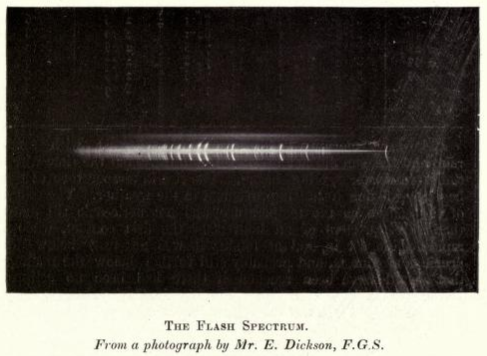
Flash spectrum of total solar eclipse, Burgos, August 1905

His work with celluloid was not limited to investigation of its uses in astronomy. He reported in 1902 that he had demonstrated the explosive nature of the substance by substituting it for the cordite in a bullet and then firing that bullet through a 1 inch (25 mm) thick piece of wood. Similarly, although he used partial vacuums in his development of his diffraction gratings, he also investigated their use elsewhere as, for example, in his paper of 1903 entitled On the Production of Polished Metallic Surfaces having the Properties of Japanese "Magic" Mirrors. These and numerous other contributions – including experiments in soldering aluminium and the use of optics for gunsights – were reported to the Manchester Literary and Philosophical Society, of which he had been elected a member on 21 January 1896. He served as member of the Society's Council for all but one year between 1902 and 1912, was a vice-president for three years and was offered, but refused, a nomination to be president.

Thorp was a member of expeditions to view the total solar eclipses of 1900 and 1905, which visited Algiers and Burgos, respectively. Examples of his inventions were used by various members of the parties.

Proposed by David G. Simpson, Thorp was elected a Fellow of the Royal Astronomical Society on 11 April 1902. He was also a vice-president of the Manchester Astronomical Society, of which he had been a member since 1892.

== Death ==
Thorp died at Prestatyn on 13 June 1914, leaving a widow and three sons, one of whom – Franklin – also had involvements in the gas industry. He was buried at All Saints' Church, Stand, a few days later. He also left a partially developed scheme for the manufacture of a ruling machine that obviated the need for a screw drive, being controlled instead by a mercury clepsydra and micrometre valve, and had been working on the design of a cinema screen. Thorp's Cooke telescope was given by the family to Stand Grammar School. One obituarist remarked on his "unassuming and genial manner to all with whom he came into contact, and his readiness to explain and to make suggestions on any subject in which his wide knowledge could be of any assistance."

The business that he founded, Thomas Thorp & Co. Ltd, was finally liquidated in 1976.

== Bibliography ==
- "Advertisement". American Gas Light Journal. LXXXIV (14). New York. 2 April 1906.
- "Contracts". The Sanitary Record. London. 15 August 1890. p. 102 – via Internet Archive.
- "Deaths". The Manchester Guardian. 16 June 1914. p. 20. ProQuest 475774552. (subscription required)
- Duckworth, M. (1975). "Manchester Astronomical Society 1903 – 1978". Manchester Astronomical Society.
- Gerhard, William Paul (1908). The American Practice of Gas Piping and Gas Lighting in Buildings (Republished by Forgotten Books ed.). New York: McGraw Hill. p. 152. ISBN 978-1-4400-5835-6 – via Internet Archive.
- Laxton's Price Book. 1877.
- Levander, Frederick William, ed. (1906). The total solar eclipse, 1905. London: British Astronomical Association – via Internet Archive.
- "Manchester Institution". Associations of Gas Engineers and Manufacturers – United Kingdom – Reports of Proceedings, 1898. London. 1899 – via Internet Archive.
- Maunder, Edward Walter, ed. (1901). The total solar eclipse, 1900. London: British Astronomical Association – via Internet Archive.
- Nasmith, J. (1895) [First published 1894]. "Prepayment Gas Meters". Transactions of the Manchester Association of Engineers – via Internet Archive.
- "Ordinary Meeting". Memoirs and Proceedings of the Manchester Literary & Philosophical Society. XLVII: ii. 1902–1903 – via Internet Archive.
- "Proceedings at the Meeting of the Royal Astronomical Society". The Observatory. 25 (316): 114. March 1902. Bibcode:1902Obs....25..114.
- "Report of the Council to the Ninety-fifth Annual General Meeting". Monthly Notices of the Royal Astronomical Society. LXXV (4): 250–251. February 1915. Bibcode:1915MNRAS..75..250.. doi:10.1093/mnras/75.4.250.
- "Thomas Thorp". Gas Age. XXXIV (2). New York. 15 July 1914.
- Thorp, Thomas (February 1906). "A Note on Diffraction Grating Replicas". Popular Astronomy. 14: 93. Bibcode:1906PA.....14...93T.
- "Thorp's replica of a Rowland diffraction grating". Australia: Powerhouse Museum.
- W.H.T. (1913–1914). "Obituary". Memoirs and Proceedings of the Manchester Literary & Philosophical Society. LVIII – via Internet Archive.
- Waller, Rhian (18 May 2011). "Is your face fit for a mural?". The Journal. Rhyl.
- Williams, Mari E. W. (1994). The precision makers: a history of the instruments industry in Britain and France, 1870–1939. Routledge. ISBN 978-0-415-03732-7.
- "No. 23932". The London Gazette. 27 December 1872. p. 6485.
- "No. 24257". The London Gazette. 22 October 1875. p. 4980.
- "No. 46950". The London Gazette. 1 July 1976. p. 9126.
