= William Rimmer (music) =

- Born: 1862; Southport, Lancashire, England
- Died: 9 February 1936 (age 73–74) Southport, Lancashire, England
- Occupations: Composer, conductor

William Rimmer (1862–1936) was a Lancashire composer and conductor of brass band music who was particularly well known for his marches.

Rimmer was born in Southport in 1862 into a musical family. His father was bandmaster of the Lancashire Volunteer Rifles and encouraged both Rimmer and his brother Robert in their musical studies. At the age of 15 Rimmer joined the Southport Rifle band as a side-drummer and then moved on to the cornet, eventually becoming the band's principal cornet soloist. As a young man he made himself into one of the finest cornet players in the country under the eye of Alexander Owen at Besses o' th' Barn Band. His prowess on the instrument became well known, and he was engaged as a soloist by many of the best bands of the day. He eventually gave up playing to concentrate on training and conducting bands. He started his conducting career with the Skelmersdale Old Band and the Skelmersdale Temperance Band where he saw excellent success at local contests from 1891 to 1895. Then like most of the top brass band conductors of his generation, he became associated with many different bands in the Lancashire area. At the height of his fame conducted every winning band at both the Crystal Palace and Belle Vue competitions between 1905 and 1909.

In 1999, a CD dedicated to his music, recorded by Fodens Courtois Band, was released on the Doyen label (DOY CD080).

On 29 July 2007, Phillip Hunt devoted his weekly "Sounds of Brass" radio programme on BBC Radio Devon to Rimmer and his works.

== Works ==
=== Marches ===
- The Arabian
- The Australasian
- The Avenger
- Black Fury
- The Black Knight
- Blencathra
- The Carnival King
- The Cavalier
- The Commonwealth
- The Cossack
- The Cross of Honour
- The Cycle Parade
- Farewell, My Comrades
- The Field Day
- Harlequin
- Honest Toil
- Honour the Brave
- Indomitable
- Irresistable
- Jack o' Lantern
- John Peel
- Jubilant
- Knight of the Road
- Marine Artillery
- The North Star
- The Northumbrian
- Old Comrades
- Orion
- The President (Under pseudonym William German)
- Punchinello
- Ravenswood
- Ready and Steady
- Red Gauntlet
- Slaidburn
- Sons of the Wild
- Strathcona
- Valorous
- The Victors Return
- The Virtuoso
- Viva Birkinshaw
