= Listed buildings in Whitefield, Greater Manchester =

Whitefield is a town in the Metropolitan Borough of Bury, Greater Manchester, England and contains the area of Stand. It is unparished, and contains 14 listed buildings that are recorded in the National Heritage List for England. Of these, one is listed at Grade I, the highest of the three grades, and the others are at Grade II, the lowest grade. The area is mainly residential, and the listed buildings include houses and associated structures, churches and related items, and two war memorials.

== Key ==
Grade	Criteria
I	Buildings of exceptional interest, sometimes considered to be internationally important
II	Buildings of national importance and special interest

== Buildings ==
Name and location	Photograph	Date	Notes	Grade
Broxups; 53.54418°N 2.29517°W	—	17th century	The house was altered later, including the front added in the 18th century. It is in brick, with two storeys, and it has a symmetrical front of four bays. On the front is a doorway with Tuscan half-columns, a fanlight with Gothick tracery, and an open pediment, and the windows are sashes.	II
Brick Farmhouse, Griffe Lane, Unsworth; 53.56388°N 2.26060°W		1681	The farmhouse is in brick with a rendered front, two storeys with an attic, and three bays. The windows have brick mullions, some blocked, and others converted into casements. On the front is a 20th-century porch. Also on the house is a relief band with various decorations, and there are similar decorations on the right gable end.	II
Stand House; 53.54714°N 2.30876°W	—	Late 18th century	A Georgian house in red brick with a modillioned cornice. There are two storeys, and seven bays on the front and on the left return. On the front the middle three bays project forward under a pediment. The central doorway has Tuscan pilasters, a pulvinated frieze, and a stone pediment.	II
All Saints' Church, Stand; 53.55017°N 2.29859°W		1821–1826	A Commissioners' church designed by Charles Barry, it is in stone. The church consists of a nave, north and south aisles, a chancel with a canted apsidal east end, and a west tower. The tower is slim, and contains an open porch, lancet windows, clock faces, and an embattled parapet with crocketed corner pinnacles. Along the sides of the nave are two tiers of windows, and all the parapets are embattled and have pinnacles.	I
Gate piers and walls, Philips Park Road Lodge; 53.53793°N 2.30428°W	—	Early 19th century	The gate piers and end piers are in stone, they are square and rusticated, and have ball finials. The piers are joined by curved walls.	II
Philips Park Road Lodge; 53.53779°N 2.30442°W	—	Early 19th century	A brick house in Tudor Revival style, with stone dressings. It has a band between the storeys and moulded copings. There are two storeys, an asymmetrical plan, three gables, and mullioned windows.	II
Gateway and piers, All Saints' Church, Stand; 53.55028°N 2.29905°W	—	c. 1826	The gate piers at the entrance to the churchyard are in stone, with panels, and are surmounted by moulded cast iron lamp standards. Between the piers are decorated cast iron gates.	II
Lamp post 53.55017°N 2.29886°W	—	c. 1826	The moulded lamp post is in cast iron, and is in the churchyard of All Saints' Church, Stand.	II
Stand Rectory; 53.54996°N 2.30070°W	—	c. 1830	The rectory was converted from a farmhouse by Charles Barry, and is in Regency style. It is roughcast with a symmetrical front of three bays, and there is a recessed lower one-bay extension on the right. The windows on the ground floor are mullioned and transomed, and on the upper floor they are mullioned. On the front is a polygonal porch with a lead roof, and above the door is a fanlight.	II
Monument to Joseph Leng and others 53.55011°N 2.29927°W	—	1856	The monument is in the churchyard of All Saints' Church, Stand. It is in Perpendicular style, and consists of a pinnacle on a square base.	II
Besses United Reformed Church and associated buildings 53.54283°N 2.29002°W		1864–65	The church, designed by Alfred Waterhouse in Gothic Revival style, is in red brick with detailing in yellow and blue brick, and it has steep slate roofs. The building has a T-shaped plan with transepts, and in the west end is a rose window. Further buildings were added at the rear in 1889, including a schoolroom.	II
Monument to John Munn and others 53.54981°N 2.29881°W	—	1877	The monument is in the churchyard of All Saints' Church, Stand, and is in Classical style. It has a square panelled base and a finial in the form of an urn.	II
Whitefield War Memorial; 53.54938°N 2.30022°W		c. 1920	The war memorial is in the churchyard of All Saints' Church, Stand. It consists of a tapered cruciform column on a stepped base in Portland stone. On the column is a bronze statue of The Winged Victory on a globe with a serpent, and at its base are wreathes and swags. On three sides of the column are bronze plaques with the names of those lost in the world wars, and on the fourth face is an inscription.	II
Unsworth War Memorial; 53.56047°N 2.27349°W		1923	The war memorial is in pale cream stone. It has an octagonal stepped base, a podium, and a moulded stepped plinth. On this is a cross with a chamfered foot, an octagonal tapering shaft, and a cross with tapering arms. On the front is a sword in relief and a wreath. On the base and the podium and inscriptions and the names of those lost in both world wars.	II
