= John Bevis =

English astronomer (1695–1771)

John Bevis FRS
- Born: 10 November 1695; Salisbury, Wiltshire, England
- Died: 6 November 1771 (aged 75)

John Bevis (10 November 1695 – 6 November 1771) FRS was an English medical doctor, electrical researcher and astronomer. He is best known for discovering the Crab Nebula in 1731. He was educated at Christ Church, Oxford, being awarded his B.A. in 1715 and his M.A. in 1718.

In 1757 Bevis published in London a volume on The History and Philosophy of Earthquakes in which he collected accounts of the 1755 Lisbon earthquake from diverse authentic sources. His survey, the first of its kind, was subsequently used by John Michell (1761).

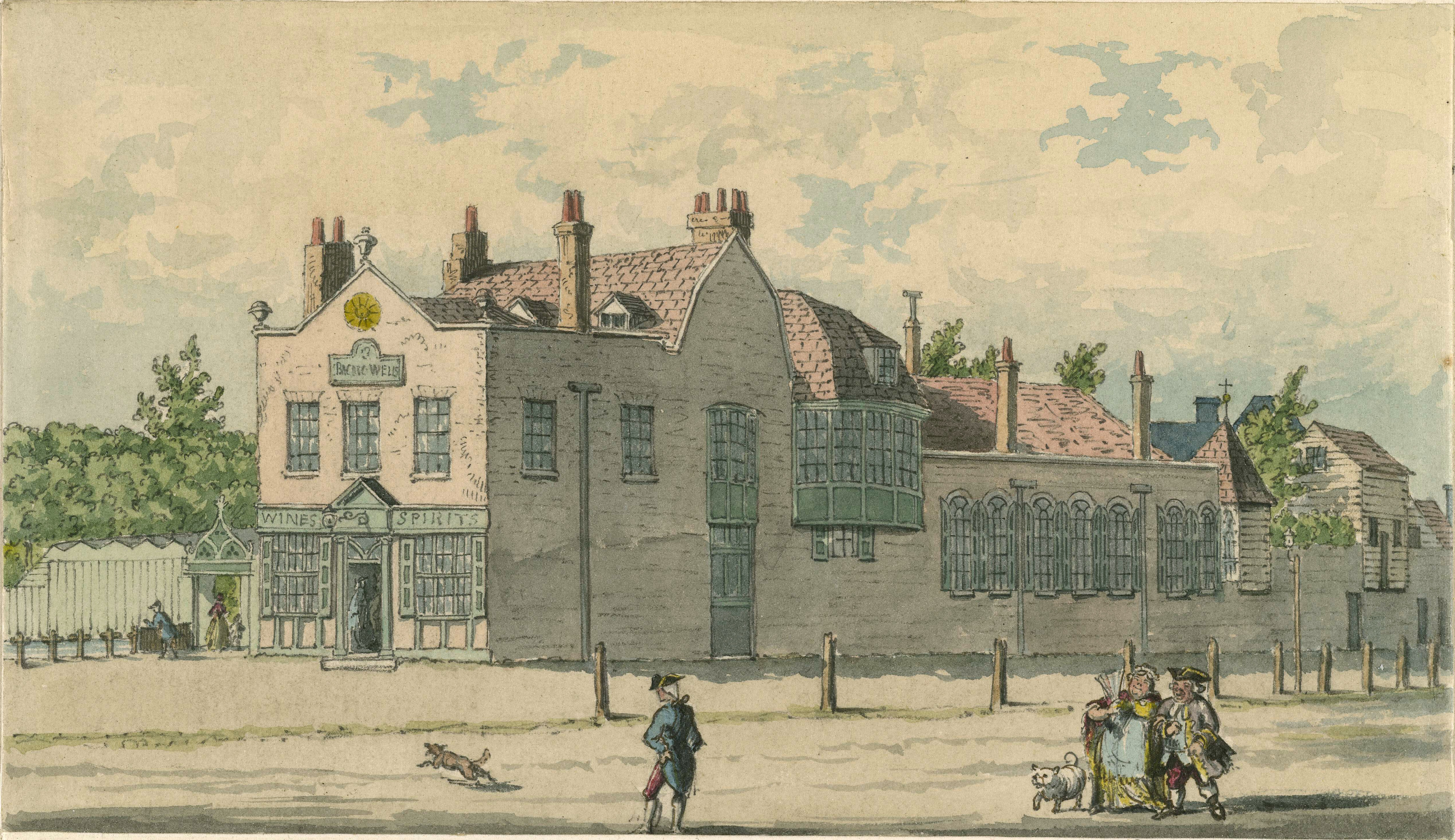
A watercolour of Bagnigge Wells by Samuel Hieronymus Grimm

In 1757 Bevis was asked by the tobacconist Thomas Hughes to discover why no flowers would grow in his garden at Bagnigge House, which stood in the vicinity of 61–63 King's Cross Road, London. He found the water from the well on the site to be full of iron. On this research, a second well was dug, the water from which was found to be a good purgative. This led to the establishment of one of the most popular 18th-century spas, Bagnigge Wells, the following year. He was elected a Fellow of the Royal Society in November, 1765.

== Electrical research ==
When the Leyden jar first arrived in the UK (1746), Bevis worked with William Watson in refining it. They removed the water and replaced it with lead shot, then later lined the inside and exterior of the glass with lead. They also experimented to determine the speed of electricity using nearly four kilometers of wire and observing the spark made on entering the wire, and that made on leaving it: they could not detect any time delay and concluded it must be almost instantaneous.

Watson and Bevis corresponded extensively with Benjamin Franklin and his group of Philadelphia experimenters and they jointly: refined the Leyden jar by coating the inside and outside with tin foil; joined Leyden jars together to create a "battery"; distinguished between the charge in Leyden jars linked in series from those linked in parallel; created a flat glass-plate and tin-foil version of the Jar battery (the first flat-plate condensor); developed the single-fluid theory of electricity which emphasised a superabundance of the fluid on one side, and a deficit on the other; introduced the concept of positive and negative charges.

== Astronomer ==
Besides discovering the Crab Nebula (M1, when it got listed decades later in Messier's catalogue), Bevis also observed an occultation by Venus of Mercury on 28 May 1737 NS, (17 May 1737 OS) and observed and found a prediction rule for eclipses of Jupiter's moons.

Besides discovering the Crab Nebula, Bevis is known for his proposal to compile a modern British star atlas, Uranographia Britannica. The first mention was in an advertisement in the Northampton Mercury of 11 April 1748 notifying that subscribers could obtain copies of the atlas when finished.

Uranographia was based on Flamsteed's star positions, published posthumously in 1725 as Historia Coelestis Britannica, a catalogue of 2,935 stars, together with additional stars from Bevis’s own observations made between 1738 and 1739 from Stoke Newington. In 1731, Bevis had been the first to notice what we now call the Crab Nebula (Messier 1). Uranographia Britannica was the first of the "classical" star atlases to include non-stellar objects.

In 1750, as the atlas was still in the process of being compiled, Bevis's publisher, John Neale was declared bankrupt, the copper plates sequestered by the London Courts of Chancery and the project terminated. Uranographia Britannica was never published. In 1785, long after the death of Neale and of Bevis, Bevis's library was auctioned by the widow of his executor, James Horsfall F.R.S. According to the auction catalogue, three near-complete atlases were sold together with an unknown number of star charts that were later compiled into an unknown number of atlases and offered for sale anonymously in 1786 as Atlas Celeste, essentially to use up the existing stock of pre-printed star charts. It is this atlas which forms the bulk of the currently identified Bevis atlases but unlike Uranographia Britannica that Bevis intended to have explanatory notes and catalogues, Atlas Celeste does not.

Of the three, nearly-finished, Uranographia Britannica, one was bought at the Sotheby & Wilkinson sale, London, 21 January 1856, by the American Philosophical Society, Philadelphia. This APS copy is the atlas on which Ashworth based his 1981 seminal description. Another is at St John's College, Cambridge. In poor condition and dirty, it is not as complete as the APS atlas. The third and last atlas sold at auction in 1785 was identified in November 2011 [by Kilburn] in the Duke of Devonshire's Collection at Chatsworth House, Derbyshire. In good condition it is second only to the APS atlas, having fewer descriptive notes to accompany the star charts.

All three copies of Bevis’s intended Uranographia have now been identified. We also know the whereabouts [2022] of twenty-seven of the twenty-nine described copies of Atlas Celeste; most are in the UK or USA. Two are missing, presumed to be in private collections. Examination of currently known Atlas Celestes that do not have the intended full set of 51 star charts suggests that the compiler was running out of them. Other than that at Lund University library, Sweden, none has yet been identified elsewhere in continental Europe. There are two copies in Australia.

The Manchester Astronomical Society (U.K.; an amateur society) has a website for the Bevis star charts at https://www.manastro.org/bevis.html. Member Kevin Kilburn keeps an updated list of bound and unbound Bevis plates and atlases at: https://www.manastro.org/bevis/IDENTIFIED_Uranographia_sets_SEPTEMBER_2020.pdf

== Personal life ==
Bevis died in 1771 as a result of falling off his telescope.

He was an acquaintance of Thomas Paine when living at the Temple.

== Sources ==
- Weinreb, B; Hibbert, C, eds. (1983). The London Encyclopaedia. Macmillan London Ltd. ISBN 0-333-45817-6.
