= Edward Hobson (botanist) =

British botanist (1782–1830)

Edward Hobson (1782–1830) was an English weaver and botanist who is associated with the Manchester School of Botany, as represented by such people at John Horsefield and Richard Buxton. His specialism was the study of bryology. One result of this was the publication of his two-volume collection of dried, pressed specimens, A collection of specimens of British mosses and Hepaticae, collected in the vicinity of Manchester, and systematically arranged with reference to the Muscologia Britanica, English Botany, &c, &c, &c, by Edward Hobson, between 1818 and 1822. This exsiccata work with 240 herbarium specimen units served as a companion to the 1818 book, Muscologia Britannica: Containing the Mosses of Great Britain and Ireland that was produced by William Jackson Hooker and Thomas Taylor, from whom Buxton received encouragement.
