= Thomas Thorpe (disambiguation) =

Thomas Thorpe (1569–1635) was an English publisher.

Thomas Thorpe or Thorp may also refer to:

- Thomas Thorpe (fl. 1404), MP for Rutland (UK Parliament constituency)
- Thomas Thorpe (speaker) (died 1461), Speaker of the House of Commons in England
- Thomas Bangs Thorpe (1815–1878), American antebellum humorist and artist
- Thomas Edward Thorpe (1845–1925), British chemist
- Tom Thorpe (born 1993), English footballer
- Thomas Thorp (judge) (1925–2018), New Zealand judge
- Thomas Thorp (scientific instrument manufacturer) (1850–1914), English manufacturer of scientific instruments
- Tom Thorp (died 1942), American football player and coach, sports writer, and football and horse racing official
- Thomas Thorp (priest) (1797–1877), Archdeacon of Bristol
- Tommy Thorpe (1881–1953), English footballer and cricketer
