= Richard Buxton =

Richard Buxton may refer to:

- Richard Buxton (botanist) (1786–1865), British botanist
- Richard Buxton (judge) (born 1938), former British judge
