= John Horsefield =

British botanist (1792–1854)

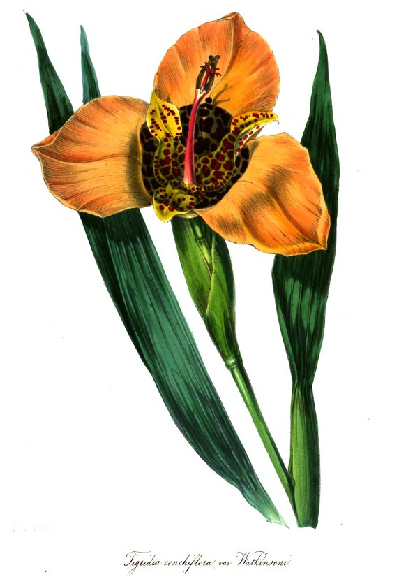
Tigridia conchiflora var. 'Watkinsoni', a lily first hybridised by John Horsefield

John Horsefield (18 July 1792 – 6 March 1854) was an English handloom weaver and amateur botanist after whom the daffodil Narcissus 'Horsfieldii' is named. Horsefield had little formal schooling, and acquired most of his botanical knowledge through self-study and involvement in local botanical groups, which provided a venue for working class people to share knowledge, in part by pooling money to purchase books.

Horsefield founded one such society, the Prestwich Botanical Society, and was later president of a larger botanical society covering a wide area around north Manchester. He made several botanical discoveries and cultivated two new plants. A number of his writings about the working class and also some poetry were published, but nothing concerning botany other than in connection with the subject of the working class. He lived most of his life near Whitefield in Lancashire, in dire poverty. At the time of his death he had been married for 42 years and had fathered eleven children.

== Early life ==
Born on 18 July 1792, John Horsefield was the eldest son of Charles Horsefield, a barely literate man from whom he received encouragement in his early botanical interests. He reminisced in later life that both his father and his grandfather had been interested in botany and in floriculture. His birthplace was probably Besses o' th' Barn in Whitefield close to Prestwich, which became his home. His mother claimed he was born "dead" and had to be revived; his childhood was dogged by poor health.

Horsefield learned to read during a single year's attendance at school when he was six, after which he went to work for a gingham weaver. His education continued with twice-weekly evening tuition in writing and arithmetic until he was around 15 years old. James Cash, a journalist, amateur botanist and the first chairman of the Manchester Cryptogamic Society, says Horsefield received some education for a short time when he started work: the weaver for whom he served charged two shillings (10p) per calendar quarter to instruct his young employees in reading. This instruction took the form of the employees reading out lessons to him while they worked at their handlooms. An avid reader, his interest in botany was piqued when he obtained a copy of Nicholas Culpeper's 1653 book, The Complete Herbal, of which he said, "The wonderful properties that are there ascribed to plants excited in me a strong desire to get acquainted with the plants themselves." Thereafter he attended working-men's botanical societies and meetings in public houses, (Note: The choice of pubs as the venue for such meetings in the Manchester area was explained by Leo Grindon in 1882: "... [they were] the only place where working men can assemble inexpensively; and though this may seem to some persons detrimental to good order and sobriety, no religious service was ever more decorously conducted." He noted that, "Twice only, during upwards of seventy years, have the meetings being interfered with by the authorities, and in neither case has it been from disapproval of them, or because of misconduct on the part of the members." Grindon's use of the phrase "religious service" is significant: there were influential temperance and Sabbatarian movements at the time which objected to such venues and meetings held on Sundays, and he sought to deflect criticism from those quarters. Another reason for the use of pubs was that they served as storage areas for the botanical libraries and herbariums.) thus meeting a broad church of people with interests not only in the science of botany but also in floriculture, herbalism and horticulture.

Horsefield and his father were members of an early 19th-century loose grouping of Mancunian amateur botanists, and of a short-lived botanical society for working men in Whitefield. Horsefield attended meetings of the former group in 1808, which was referred to as the "Manchester Society of Botanists" or the "Botanist Society". Anne Secord, a historian of 19th century popular science, quotes an attendee of the society, Thomas Heywood, who describes it as being "without any regular place of meeting, without funds, without books and without rules; a sort of members, but no body, having only one object in common – their love of plants".

The Whitefield society arranged for funds to be pooled to buy books for communal use, enabling the 16-year-old Horsefield to read James Lee's 1760 work, An Introduction to Botany. It provided information on Linnaean taxonomy as it applied to plants, and from it Horsefield copied details onto a piece of paper he pinned to his loom to commit them to memory while he was working. He earned the respect of other botanists for his abilities in the sphere of collection and identification of species and was the first to find the Entosthodon templetoni moss in England. (Note: The Entosthodon templetoni moss has also been known as Funaria templetoni and as Weissia templetoni.)

Horsfield met his future wife Esther Eccorsley (1793/94 – 1872) at a botanical meeting in 1812. The couple were married on 20 December 1812 at St Mary's Church, Oldham.

== Leadership ==
The meetings he attended in his early life were a part of a movement in the study of botany by artisans. This had been initiated by George Caley, James Crowther, John Dewhurst, John Mellor and Edward Hobson, the last of whom Horsefield met in 1809 at a meeting held at Radcliffe Bridge and whose knowledge he held in high regard. It was part of a broader working class movement involving the study of nature and natural history that developed in the late 18th century and continued into the next.

There is some evidence to suggest that in the period of social unrest that followed the end of the Napoleonic Wars, and which saw the introduction of the Seditious Meetings Act, gatherings of botanists may have been used as cover for the activities of politically radical reformers such as Samuel Bamford. Horsefield, who witnessed the Peterloo Massacre of 1819, had such sympathies and recounted that

With politics I had little to do practically; but in 1816, after the war was over – an event which I had been taught to look to for the restoration of good trade – finding ourselves disappointed, that year of dear provisions and no work turned all my neighbours, as well as myself, into a kind of politicians. "Parliamentary Reform" was the cry. I attended several reform meetings in 1816, and for a few years after. I attended one at Bury and one at Middleton, at each of which Samuel Bamford presided.

The Peterloo Massacre was the last political meeting Horsefield attended, although he retained a general interest in the subject of radical politics. He attended the Manchester Mechanics' Institute, supported the idea of self-education and, according to Harvey Taylor, a historian, "typified the Lancashire autodidactic seeker after self-culture." Having obtained his own garden in 1819, he promoted his interests by founding the Prestwich Botanical Society on 11 September 1820, presiding over meetings in a pub where plant specimens were brought together for identification and where those who could not read were taught the science of botany by those who could. He was president of the society for 32 years, during which time at least 131 books were purchased by the society for communal use. Writing in December 1829, Horsefield explained that the Prestwich Society met on the second Monday of each month and usually had between 12 and 20 members, who were charged a monthly 6d. (2½p) subscription. The subscription, which was common to such societies, was intended to pay for books and create a fund for the purchase of drink; the pub landlord provided the meeting and storage space at no charge as long as sufficient drink was consumed, a practice known as "wet rent".

In 1830 he succeeded Hobson as president of an organisation with a wider geographical base and which held Sunday meetings in pubs for the purpose of educating the amateur artisan botanists. The Manchester botanist Leo Grindon (1818–1904) described this body as "the united societies of the whole district", while another, Richard Buxton, who led an impoverished life like Horsefield, referred to it as the "General Botanical Meetings" whose gatherings took place at venues between Clayton, Eccles, Manchester, Middleton, Newton Heath and Radcliffe. Horsefield explained the didactic purpose of these societies as

[W]e instruct one another by continually meeting together; so that the knowledge of one becomes the knowledge of all, and we make up for the deficiency of education by constant application to the subject.

He noted how the procedure for imparting the knowledge had to be changed such that, certainly by the 1850s and possibly as early as 1830, the president's role was to select specimens from those brought to the meeting and identify them to the attendees, who sat in silence. Horsefield describes this change as being necessary because previously the president

taking a specimen off the table ... gave it to the man on his left hand, telling him at the same time its generic and specific name; he passed it on to another, and so on round the room; and all the other specimens followed in a similar manner. But, from the noise and confusion caused by each person telling his neighbour the name of the specimen, some being unable to pronounce it, some garbling it, and all talking at once, we have been constrained of late years to adopt another method.

He championed these working people in print, praising their self-taught skills, demanding they be accorded the respect of others working in the botanical field and using them as an example to counter generalised accusations such as those made by John Claudius Loudon that the textile workers of Lancashire were ignorant and degraded. He composed verses, including The Botanists' Song, which acknowledged the conviviality obtained from meeting in pubs with the words "science circles with the glass". But he did not produce any written works directly relating to botany, and in 1847 turned down the opportunity to write on the flora of Manchester with Buxton, whom he met in 1826 while they were independently studying plant life on Kersal Moor and whom he introduced to the Prestwich Botanical Society. Buxton was of the opinion that Horsefield was "not a mere country herbalist, but an excellent scientific botanist", and the 1826 meeting presented Buxton with opportunities to meet a like-minded circle of men where previously his had been a solitary pursuit.

Horsefield did not confine his scientific interests to botany, as he also studied algebra, mensuration and astronomy. Charles Horsefield had also encouraged his son in the last pursuit, taking him to meet Robert Ward, an astronomer in Blackley who had a telescope. John Horsefield developed an interest in the subject to the extent that he constructed an orrery, much to the bewilderment of his neighbours.

Cash notes that when constructing his orrery, Horsefield asked a local man to manufacture a golden ball to represent the sun and the man replied that "Aw'll mak' thee one an' charge thee now't for't; but, let me tell thee, fancy folk like thee 're a'lus poor". (Note: "I'll make you one and charge you nothing for it; but, let me tell you, fanciful folk like you are always poor.") Indeed, he was: all of his interests were indulged despite a background of dire poverty, and he remarked of his celebrity in botanical circles that "fame is not bread". He remained a gingham weaver and during his lifetime the sole financial benefit from his interests came when he raised a new hybrid lily – Tigridia conchiflora – in his garden and sold it to a Manchester nurseryman, Thomas Watkinson, for £10. (Note: Horsefield produced the hybrid by fertilising the seeds of a conchiflora with the pollen of a pavonia but the plant was named in honour of the nurseryman who produced the first botanical drawing of it.) His poverty caused him to be exempted from contributing to the book fund of the Prestwich Botanical Society from the mid-1820s, and he was later exempted from paying into the liquor funds of both that society and the wider-based group. These concessions demonstrate the extent to which his knowledge was appreciated and occurred despite the teetotal Hobson having to pay into a liquor fund of which by definition he took no advantage. Horsefield received £13 10s. from a subscription that was started in 1853 in another attempt to alleviate his penurious state. After his death on 6 March 1854, Esther, with whom he had six sons and five daughters, (Note: Among Horsefield's sons was William, who became secretary of the Prestwich Botanical Society in due course, and was Whitefield's first postman. Research of the Prestwich Parish records by the Prestwich & Whitefield Heritage Society has provided some detail about these eleven children, at least three of whom died in infancy and a further two on different days in May 1849) received £37 from this fund, and he left 37 bulbs of one of the earliest hybrid daffodils to be cultivated, Narcissus horsefieldii, that raised another £2 11s (£2.55). (Note: Narcissus Horsfieldii now given as Narcissus 'Horsfieldii'. More generally, Horsefield's name is spelled as Horsfield in some sources. Jo Whittingham describes the daffodil as having "elegantly flared yellow trumpets and milk-white perianth".) N. horsefieldii became one of the most popular and extensively grown varieties of daffodil.

== Death ==
John Horsefield died on 6 March 1854, aged 62, probably as a consequence of a strangulated hernia that had been masked by a tumour. (Note: A report in The New York Journal of Medicine describes a doctor being called to attend a 62-year-old John Horsfield in Whitefield on 6 March 1854, only to find that his patient had died before his arrival.) He was buried on 10 March 1854 at the St. Mary's Church, Prestwich, although at some point in his life it seems that he had upset the authorities of the established church for reasons unknown. His table tomb was listed as a Grade II monument by English Heritage in 2012.

The epitaph on his tomb was written by Charles Swain (1807–1874). It reads:

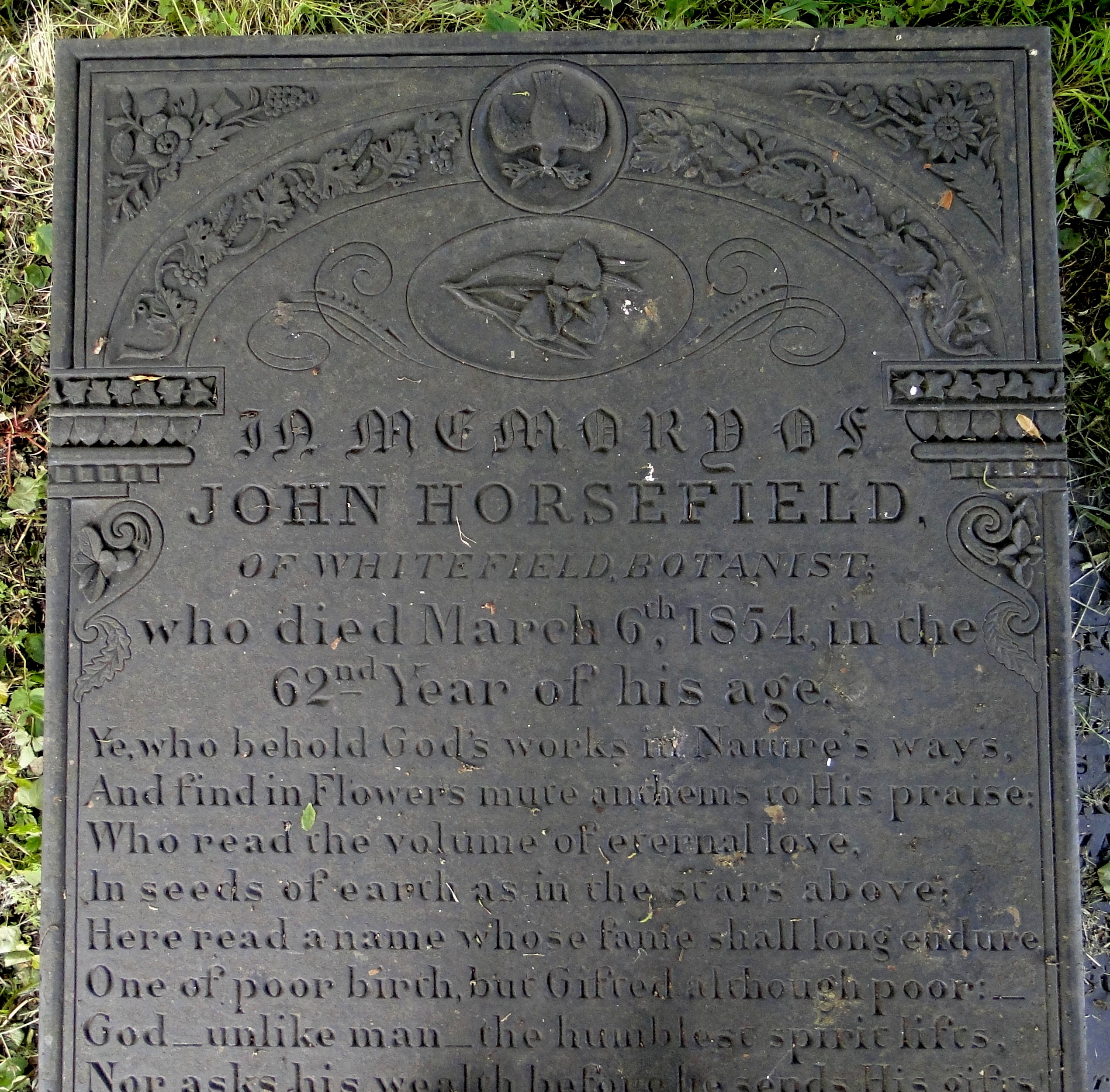
John Horsefield's gravestone

Ye who behold God's works in Nature's ways
And find in flowers mute anthems to His praise
Who read the volume of eternal love
In seeds of earth as in the stars above
Here read a name whose fame shall long endure.
One of poor birth, but Gifted although poor:
God – unlike man – the humblest spirit lifts
Nor asks his wealth before He sends His gifts!
Where'er Botanic science could be learn'd
New links disclosed – new species yet discerned
Where'er by wood or lane or heath or hill
God op'ed the book that taught Botanic skill
There HORSEFIELD's foot from dawn to eve was seen
to learn – to teach – to be what he has been,
An honour to the soil that gave him birth:
Oh, may that spirit for whose loss we grieve
Our God accept – our Saviour Lord receive.

Bamford commemorated him in a poem written in 1855, and Grindon wrote in 1882 that Horsefield was "one of the most celebrated of the old Lancashire operative botanists". Esther died on 17 June 1872. Their son, James, and his wife, Alice, are also commemorated on the headstone.

== See also ==
- John Duncan (botanist)
