= Besses o' th' Barn Band =

English brass band, based in Manchester

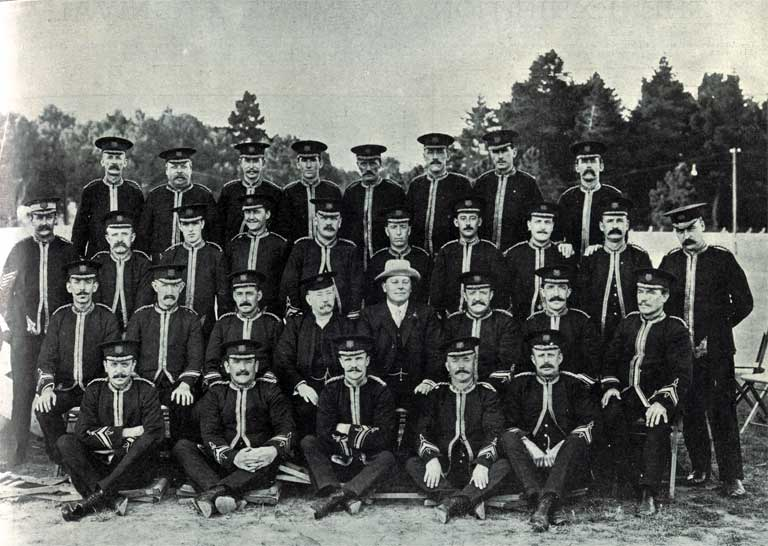
Besses o' th' Barn Band in New Zealand, 1907

Besses o' th' Barn Band is an English brass band that has been in existence in the Besses o' th' Barn area of Whitefield, Greater Manchester since at least 1818. A junior section, Besses Boys' Band, was established in 1943.

== Origins ==
Besses o' th' Barn Band was in existence by 1818 and probably originally called Clegg's Reed Band, after a local cotton manufacturer and keyed bugle player, John Clegg. It may have been called Stand Band for a period soon after that. Stand is an area of Whitefield close to Besses o' th' Barn.

The instruments used by the band in its early years were more varied than later became the case. Describing the Besses assemblage of 1818 as "extraordinarily haphazard", J. H. Elliot lists among its instruments the bass horn, clarinet, drums, French horn, keyed bugle, piccolo, trombone, and trumpet. In 1853, Besses became an all-brass band.

A census of 1896 indicated that there were 40,000 brass bands in the United Kingdom, and Trevor Herbert describes Besses as "The most remarkably forward-looking and entrepreneurial band of the nineteenth century". In the 1880s, the band bought a building at Moss Lane, Whitefield, from which to operate. Having enjoyed considerable success by 1887, it was decided to establish the band as a limited company called the Besses o' th' Barn Old Band Union Limited.

== Contests ==
The costs associated with operating a brass band in the 19th century included providing and maintaining instruments, uniforms and rehearsal facilities, as well as purchasing sheet music and paying conductors for their services. While a few bands were able to obtain patronage from wealthy sponsors, most relied on membership subscriptions, public appeals and concerts for their income. The latter was particularly significant but noteworthy institutions such as Besses and the Black Dyke Band earned large sums from participating in contests. Although there had been a few contests before 1850, they came to the fore after that time and owe much to the enterprise of Enderby Jackson, a man who promoted contests and liaised with railway companies to provide excursion arrangements for the contestants and spectators. Entrants to contests were expected not to be professional musicians, but participants for bands such as Besses supplemented their income with payments received for playing.

The two major contests were the British Open and the National Championships, but there were many other more local events. By the 1870s, the roster of instruments permitted for use in contests had been codified and the number of members in a competing band was generally set at 24.

== Recordings ==
Public interest in contests was in decline from the 1950s but Besses was among the bands that had diversified into recording its output. Sales of recordings continued to be significant for another decade. Among the band's earliest recordings was Edward German's Henry VIII Morris Dance in May 1904. Although instrumentation remains the same today as it was then, Arnold Myers notes that the instruments have "evolved" in the interim and that, "In general, the modern band is louder and thicker, the late Victorian band brighter, lighter, and crisper". The quality of the earliest recordings tends to obscure this.

A list of known Besses recordings since 1904 is as follows:

- 78 rpm records
  - Rock of Ages / Sovereignty
  - Nearer My God to Thee / Fierce Raged The Tempest
  - Jerusalem the Golden / Jesus Christ Has Risen Today
  - Rock of Ages / Sovereignty
  - The Church's One Foundation / Lead Kindly Light
  - Deep Harmony / Lascelles
  - Bradford / Rimmington
  - I passed By Your Window / Besses o' the Barn Duet
  - The Victors Return / Land of the Kangaroo
  - Barcarolle from Tales of Hoffmann / Pilgrims Chorus from Tanhouser
  - Distant Greeting / After Sunset (Intermezzo)
  - Dot and Carrie Polka / Hailstorm
  - Edwinstone / Harvey House
  - With Sword and lance
  - The Conqueror
  - Solferino
- LP records
  - Variety in Brass
  - Your Favourite Hymns
  - Alex Owen 60th Anniversary
  - Music from Vale Royal
  - Well done Lads
  - Pride of the North
  - Besses in Australia
  - Viva Vivaldi
  - Showcase for Brass
  - Heritage of the March – Volume LLL
  - Heritage of the March – Volume IIII
  - 20th Century Soloists
  - Well Done Lads
  - Hymns and Things
- Digital recordings
  - Capriccio Brilliant (Frank Bryce, 1973)
  - Hymns and Things (Roy Newsome, 1982)
  - Concertos for Brass (Roy Newsome, 1982)
  - Heritage of the March v. 3 (Roy Newsome, 1983)
  - Showcase for Brass (Roy Newsome, 1983)
  - British Bandsman (Roy Newsome, 1987)

4. Brass Band Recordings.com a. Disk 3 – 1 x track Willie Wood b. Disk 18 – 2 x tracks Willie Wood c. Disk 133 – 2 x tracks Ifor James d. Disk 177 – 8 tracks Roy Newsome e. Disk 196 – Besses Boys x 7 Barrie Chappel f. Disk 197 – 9 tracks Roy Newsome g. Disk 254 – 7 tracks Frank Bryce h. Disk 258 – 9 tracks Roy Newsome

== Tours ==
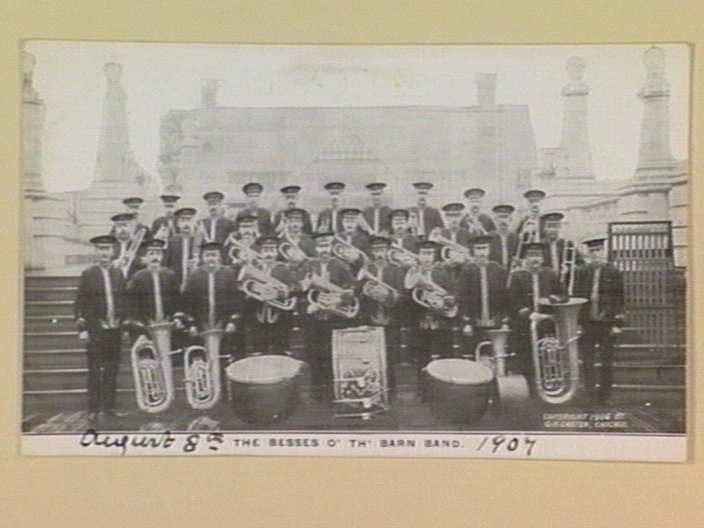
Besses Band c. 1906

The band made two "world tours" in the early 1900s, one between 1906 and 1908 and the other also lasting for more than a year. With Alexander Owen as its conductor, the band visited Australia, Canada, Fiji, Hawaii, New Zealand, South Africa and the US. A tour of Canada between August and October 1932 saw them play 112 concerts.

== Besses Boys' Band ==
Besses Boys' Band was formed in October 1943, having been preceded from 1940 by classes that taught musical theory and practice. There had been a trend for the creation of junior bands since around the early 1930s. J. C. Wright was the first bandmaster and senior members assisted in teaching the newcomers, who numbered around 60 boys within a year. Besses Band faced "massive problems" during the Second World War and the new section ensured its survival.

The Boys' Band won the National Youth Band Championships in five of the six years between inauguration of the competition in 1945 and its demise in 1950. It was ineligible to compete in 1948 because the rules stipulated that a band that had won on three consecutive occasions could not compete.

Peter Skellern was a notable member. He had success as a singer-pianist and entertainer, sometimes collaborating with the Grimethorpe Colliery Band in recordings, on television and on stage.

== See also ==
- Brass band sections in the United Kingdom
