= John Duncan (botanist) =

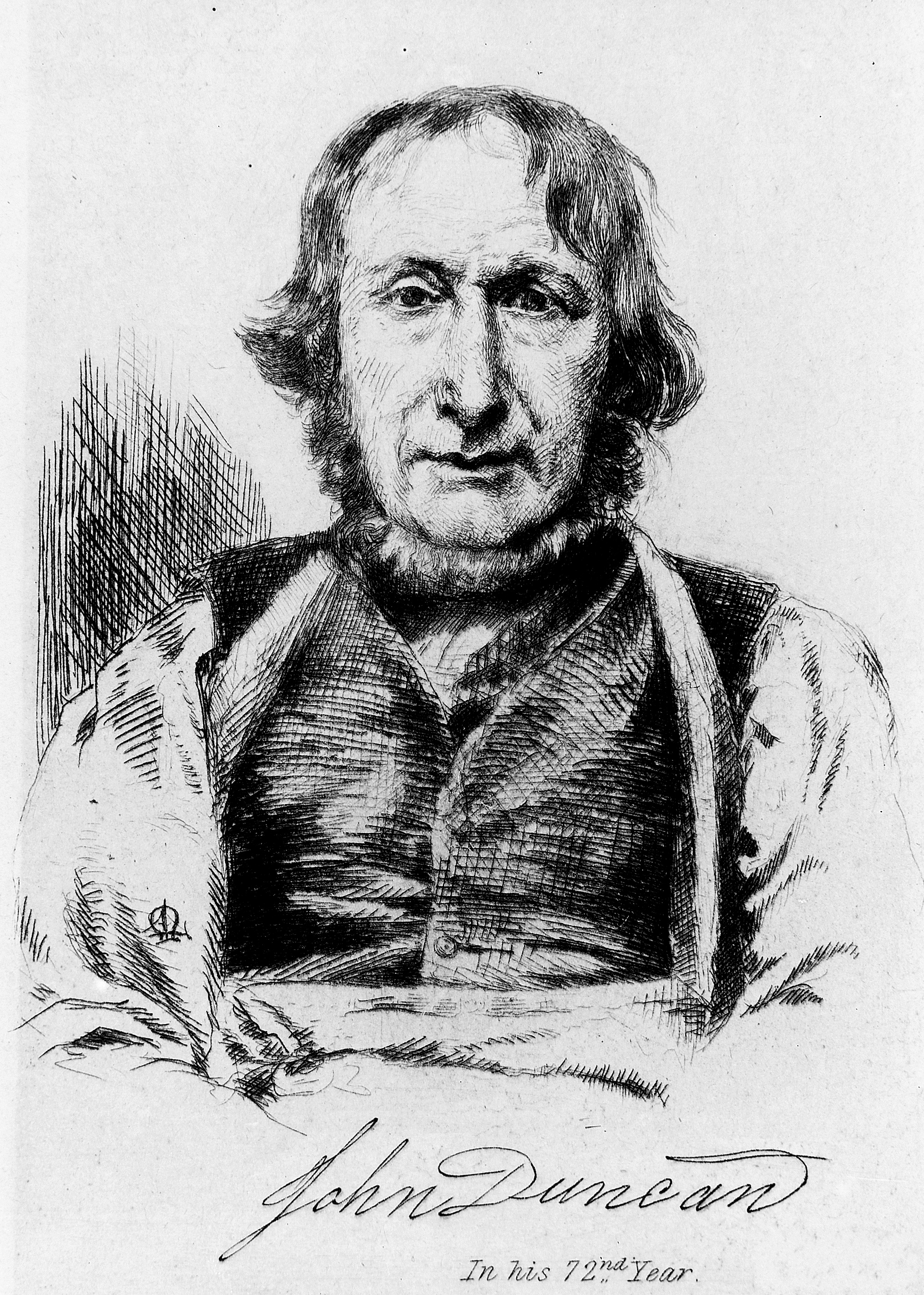
- John Duncan in 1866
- Born: 19 December 1794
- Died: 9 August 1881 (aged 86)

John Duncan (19 December 1794 – 9 August 1881) was a Scottish weaver and botanist.

== Early life ==
Duncan was born at Stonehaven, Kincardineshire, on 19 December 1794. His mother, Ann Caird, was not married to his father, John Duncan, a weaver of Drumlithie, eight miles from Stonehaven, and she supported herself and the boy by harvesting and by weaving stockings. He never went to school, but very early gathered rushes in the valleys, from which he made pith wicks for sale. During his boyhood he acquired a strong love for wild plants. From the age of fifteen he went as herd-boy to various farms, receiving cruel treatment.

In 1809, Duncan was apprenticed for five years to a weaver in Drumlithie, a village of country linen-weavers. His master, Charles Pirie, an ill-tempered man who had almost conquered the celebrated Captain Robert Barclay Allardice, carried on an illicit still and smuggled gin. He was cruel to his apprentice; but his wife helped him with reading. He did not learn to write till after he was thirty years of age. He obtained the loan of Nicholas Culpeper's British Herbal, then reputed among village herbalists.

In 1814, however, when his apprenticeship had still some months to run, Duncan ran away and returned to Stonehaven, where he lived with his mother for two years. He managed to buy a copy of Culpeper, and he practised herbalism all his life. From Culpeper, too, and the astrology it contained, he gained an introduction to astronomy.

== Move to Aberdeen ==
In 1816, Duncan and his mother moved to Aberdeen, where he learnt woollen-weaving. He married in 1818, but his wife proved unfaithful, and, after deserting him, demanded money. In 1824, Duncan became a travelling or household weaver, varying his work with harvesting, and taking a half-yearly spell of training as a militiaman at Aberdeen for nearly twenty years. He became a skilled weaver, studying the mechanics of the loom, and purchasing Essays on the Art of Weaving (Glasgow, 1808), by a namesake, the inventor of the patent tambouring machinery, Alexander Peddie's Weaver's Assistant, 1817, and Murphy on Weaving, 1831. He also devoted himself to advancing his general education by the aid of dictionaries and grammars, proceeding also to acquire some Latin and Greek. He gradually purchased Sir John Hill's edition of the Herbal, Joseph Pitton de Tournefort's Herbal, James Rennie's Medical Botany, and works on astrology and astronomy.

Duncan never possessed a watch after he left Aberdeen, but became an expert dialler, and made himself a pocket sun-dial on James Ferguson's model. From his outdoor habits of astronomical observation he was nicknamed Johnnie Meen, or Moon, and also 'the Nogman', from his queer pronunciation of the word gnomon, which he often used. For many years he lived in the Vale of Alford, under Benachie, and devoted himself chiefly to astronomy and botany. He was abstemious, his bed, board, washing, and dress not costing him more than four shillings a week.

== Botanist ==
In 1836, Duncan made the acquaintance of Charles Black, gardener at Whitehouse, near Netherton. They became friends, and helped each other in the study of botany; they formed large collections of every attainable plant for many miles round, preserving and naming them. Sir W. J. Hooker's British Flora they only managed to see at a local inn until 1852, when Duncan bought it. Duncan lived in poverty and obscurity, only emerging once as far as Edinburgh, where Black was working at the botanical gardens. His herbarium succumbed largely to dampness and insects, but in 1880, when he presented it to Aberdeen University, it still contained 75% of the British species of flowering plants, and nearly every species mentioned in George Dickie's Flora of Aberdeen, Banff, and Kincardine.

== Later life ==
After 1852 Duncan lived in the village of Droughsburn, performing every office for himself except the preparation of his meals. He was a regular church-goer, being a Free church man, but always took some wild flowers to church. He acquired considerable knowledge of animals, purchasing Charles Knight's Natural History, and in later years he studied phrenology. He was a liberal in politics.

In 1874, from failing health, Duncan was obliged to seek parish help. In 1878, Mr. W. Jolly of Inverness, who had visited him the preceding year, gave an account of Duncan in Good Words, which brought him some assistance; in 1880 a public appeal was made on his behalf. He died on 9 August 1881 in his eighty-seventh year, having left the balance of the fund raised for him to furnish prizes for the encouragement of natural science, especially botany, among the school children of the Vale of Alford.

== See also ==
- John Horsefield
