= Whitefield Town Hall =

Municipal building in Whitefield, Greater Manchester, England

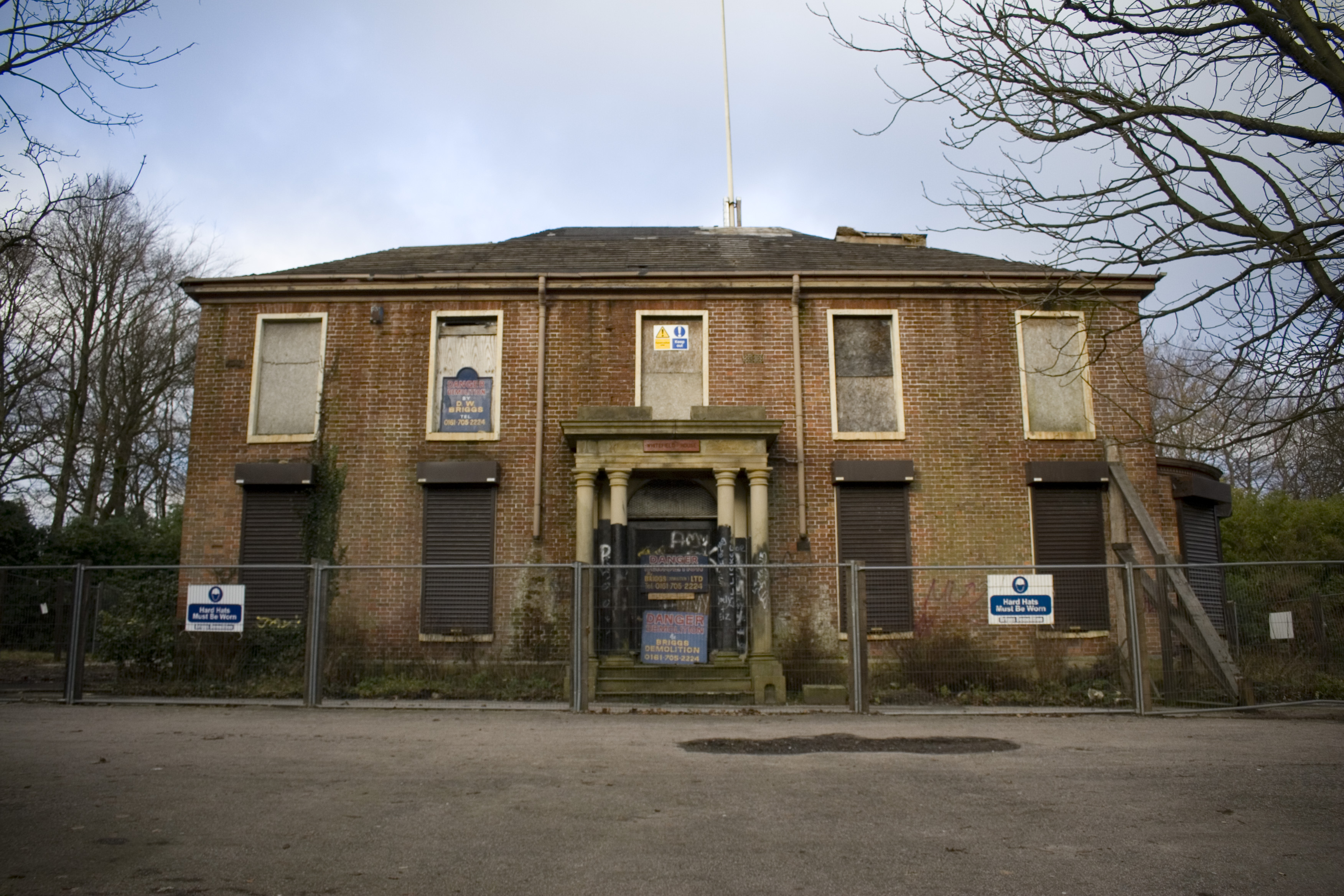
- The building in 2008

- Shown in Greater Manchester
- 53.5479°N 2.2954°W
- Location: Pinfold Lane, Whitefield

History
- Built: 1805

Site notes
- Architectural style: Neoclassical style

Whitefield Town Hall was a municipal building off Pinfold Lane, Whitefield, a town in Greater Manchester in England. The building, which served as the offices and meeting place of Whitefield Urban District Council, was demolished in 2021.

== History ==
The building was commissioned by the textile manufacturer, Edward Barlow. The site he selected was on the corner of Pinfold Lane and Bury New Road. It was designed in the neoclassical style, built in ashlar stone and was completed in 1805. The centre bay featured a porch formed by two pairs of Doric order columns supporting an entablature, a cornice and a parapet. The other bays on the ground floor and all the bays on the first floor were fenestrated by sash windows with architraves. He named the house Green Hill and lived there until 1857. It was then sold to Alfred Grundy, who renamed it Underley, before selling it to Samuel Walker, the chair of Radcliffe Urban District Council.

Whitefield local board of health was succeeded by Whitefield Urban District Council in 1894 and the new district council initially established its offices on Elms Street. As the responsibilities of the council expanded, council leaders decided to acquire new offices. The council acquired Underley for £2,450 in 1933. It then converted the house into its town hall, and removed the surrounding wall, converting the grounds into a public park.

The building continued to serve as the offices of Whitefield Urban District Council for much of the 20th century, but ceased to be the local seat of government when Bury Metropolitan Borough Council was formed in 1974. The council subsequently used the building to accommodate its engineering department. The engineering department moved out in 1985, and the building was left vacant. In 1994, metal grills were fitted to its windows, to discourage vandalism. Planning permission was granted for various proposals to convert it to housing, or into a nursing home. In 2004, developers were granted permission to demolish the building, but the council then designated a conservation area and ordered a stop to the demolition. Despite this, arson and vandalism led to a deterioration in the building's condition, and by 2011, little more than the facade remained standing.

Permission was granted to disassemble the facade and store it, but this did not take place. In 2021, developers declared that the facade was rotten and demolished it with the council's authorisation.
