= Besses o' th' Barn =

Suburb of Bury, Greater Manchester, England

Coordinates: 53.546019°N 2.278473°W

- Location within Greater Manchester
- Population: 10,664 (2011)
- OS grid reference: SD815055
- Metropolitan borough: Bury
- Metropolitan county: Greater Manchester
- Region: North West
- Country: England
- Sovereign state: United Kingdom
- Post town: MANCHESTER
- Postcode district: M45
- Dialling code: 0161
- Police: Greater Manchester
- Fire: Greater Manchester
- Ambulance: North West
- UK Parliament: Bury South

Besses o' th' Barn (/ˌbɛsɪz ət ˈbɑːrn/ BESS-iz ət BARN) is a suburb in the Metropolitan Borough of Bury, Greater Manchester, England. The population at the 2011 Census was 10,664. It lies between Radcliffe and Prestwich.

Besses o' th' Barn tram stop is on the electrified line from Manchester Victoria to Bury. The station closed for eight months for conversion to Metrolink use, re-opening on 6 April 1992.

A three-layer bridge enables Bury Old Road to run under the Manchester Metrolink line by the Metrolink station and over the M60 motorway near Junction 17. McDonald's and Aldi have stores on the retail park where Bury New Road and Bury Old Road cross, while Besses United Reformed Church, designed by Alfred Waterhouse, stands nearby. Near the McDonald's and Aldi used to stand a Co-op but it was knocked down in 2019 to make way for the larger Aldi.

The area is the home of Besses o' th' Barn Band, a brass band formed in 1818. Notable people who lived in the area include John Horsefield, Thomas Thorp and John Warburton. The area was also at one time the location of Whitefield Brewery.
