= All Saints' Church, Stand =

Coordinates: 53.5501°N 2.2986°W

All Saints' Church, Whitefield
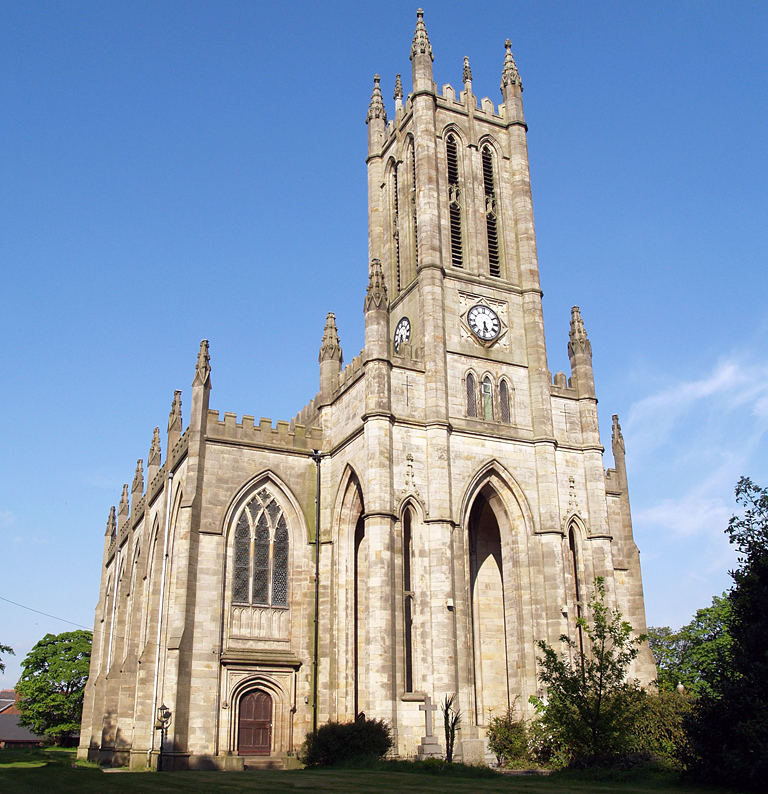
- West end

- Location in Greater Manchester
- OS grid reference: SD 803 060
- Location: Church Lane, Stand, Whitefield, Greater Manchester
- Country: England
- Denomination: Anglican
- Website: www.standchurch.com

History
- Status: Parish church

Architecture
- Functional status: Active
- Heritage designation: Grade I
- Designated: 15 August 1966
- Architect: Charles Barry
- Architectural type: Church
- Style: Gothic Revival
- Groundbreaking: 1821
- Completed: 1826
- Construction cost: £13,729

Specifications
- Materials: Millstone grit

Administration
- Province: York
- Diocese: Manchester
- Archdeaconry: Bolton
- Deanery: Radcliffe and Prestwich
- Parish: All Saints, Stand

Clergy
- Rector: Vacancy

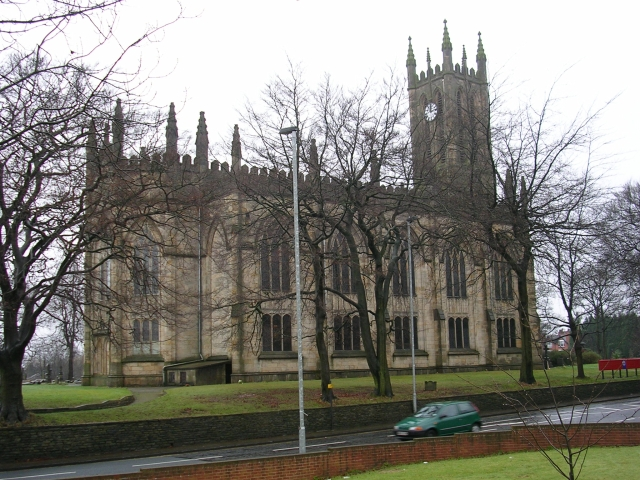
All Saints' Church from the northeast

All Saints' Church or Stand Church is an active Anglican parish church in Stand, Whitefield, Greater Manchester, England. It is in the deanery of Radcliffe and Prestwich, the archdeaconry of Bolton, and the diocese of Manchester. The church is recorded in the National Heritage List for England as a designated Grade I-listed building. It was a Commissioners' church, having received a grant towards its construction from the Church Building Commission. The church is a tall building, standing on high ground, and is constructed on a platform.

== History ==
Built between 1821 and 1826, All Saints' Church is one of the many Commissioners' churches built to celebrate the defeat of Napoleon at the Battle of Waterloo in 1815. The land on which the church and vicarage were built was given to the parish by the Earl of Derby. The architect Sir John Soane was invited to design the church to accommodate about 1,800 people, and to cost no more than £12,000. He declined and passed the commission to Charles Barry. This church was Barry's first commission. Its design was similar to his design for St Matthew, Campfield. Manchester (which has since been demolished); differing in being provided with a tower, rather than a spire. A grant of £13,812 (equivalent to £1,180,000 as of 2025) was given towards its construction by the Church Building Commission. (Note: In some cases, as in this one, the size of the grant was greater than the actual construction cost, because it included contributions towards the cost of the site, legal fees, etc.) The foundation stone was laid on 3 August 1821, and the church was consecrated by the Bishop of Chester on 8 September 1826.

== Architecture ==
=== Exterior ===
All Saints is constructed in millstone grit from the Pennines. The architectural style is described as "fanciful" Gothic. (Note: The term fanciful in this context means that although the design was loosely based on Gothic features, these were not accurate reproductions of Gothic features.) The plan of the church is rectangular in five bays, with a canted apse at the east end, and a west porch and tower. The lowest stage of the tower forms the porch, which is entered through tall narrow pointed arches. The bell openings are pairs of lancets. Along the sides of the church are two tiers of windows. The tower and the body of the church have embattled parapets and crocketed pinnacles.

=== Interior ===
Inside the church are galleries on three sides carried on slender Perpendicular piers. The plaster ceilings are vaulted. The altar, screen and pulpit date from 1921, the choir stalls and side screens date from 1937; all of these were designed by the Lancaster architects Austin and Paley. The stained glass in the east window dates from 1841 and is by D. Evans of Shrewsbury. Elsewhere are windows by Lavers, Barraud and Westlake, and by A. L. Moore, the latter dating from 1921. The monuments include one by Sievier dating from 1826 depicting a lady lying on a chaise longue.

The original organ was built by Samuel Renn in 1827 and situated in the west gallery. It was moved in 1880 to the north aisle. This organ was removed from the church in 1957. It was replaced by the present three manual organ made by Charles A. Smethurst. This organ was rebuilt in 1997 by Nicholson of Worcester. There is a ring of eight bells, all of which were cast in 1912 by Gillett and Johnston. During the 1930s there was a twenty-year programme of adornment and refurnishing of the sanctuary and chancel, culminating in the installation of a new choir stall, organ screen and clergy desks in 1937.

== See also ==
- List of churches in Greater Manchester
- Grade I listed churches in Greater Manchester
- Listed buildings in Whitefield, Greater Manchester
- List of Commissioners' churches in Northeast and Northwest England
