= Alexander Owen =

- Born: 29 April 1851; Manchester, England
- Died: 29 July 1920 (aged 69) Chorlton-on-Medlock, Lancashire, England
- Genres: Brass band
- Occupation: Conductor
- Instrument: Cornet
- Years active: 1871 census age 20 Music Master living at Grosvenor St Dukinfield with 'wife'Maria and child. Married at St Stephens Audenshaw Maria Holden June 6th 1874, his father Hugh Hairdresser, her father Publican. 1881 Census Inn Keeper at Bath Hotel Grosvenor St Dukinfield, Professor of Music. 1901 Census 530 Stretford Road Old Trafford Stretford, Bandmaster 1911 Census 530 Stretford Rd Old Trafford. Buried at Stretford Cemetery July 29th 1920 Stretford Cemetery wife deceased June 1916.

Alexander Owen (29 April 1851 – 29 July 1920) was an English brass band conductor, arranger and cornet player. It was said that he "bestrode the banding world for over 50 years."

Owen was born in Manchester, and grew up in an orphanage in Swinton. He learned to play the cornet, and by the age of 16 had become principal cornet player and conductor of the Stalybridge Old Band. By 1875 he was regarded as the best cornet player in the country, and joined the Meltham & Meltham Mills Band, leading them to three consecutive wins at the British Open brass band championships between 1876 and 1878. The following year, he joined the Black Dyke Mills Band as professional conductor, again winning the Open championships with the band in 1880 and 1881.

Although he remained involved with the Black Dyke Mills Band until 1888, he also became involved with the Besses o' th' Barn Band, working on new arrangements of works by Rossini and Beethoven that allowed them to win further national championships over the next decade. In 1903, Owen conducted 7 of the 21 bands at the national championships, gaining first prize with the Besses o' th' Barn Band and second place with the Rushden Temperance Band. In 1906, Owen led the Besses o' th' Barn Band on an international tour that took them to the U.S., Canada, Fiji, New Zealand, Australia and South Africa, touring with them again between 1909 and 1911. He continued to perform with various bands until 1919.

Owen died in Chorlton-on-Medlock, Manchester, Lancashire, in 1920.
