= Aloysius Cortie =

English Jesuit astronomer

Aloysius Laurence Cortie FRAS FRMetS
- Cortie at the Fourth Conference International Union for Cooperation in Solar Research at Mount Wilson Observatory, 1910
- Born: 22 April 1859; London, England
- Died: 16 May 1925 (aged 66)
- Education: Stonyhurst College, Lancashire St. Beuno's College, Tremeirchion
- Known for: Solar astronomy
- Scientific career
- Fields: Astronomy
- Workplaces: Stonyhurst College Observatory

Aloysius Laurence Cortie (1859 – 1925) was an English Jesuit astronomer. He served as director of the Stonyhurst College Observatory and contributed to the study of the Sun, including through observing solar eclipses.

== Life ==
Aloysius Cortie was born in London into a Catholic family. He was sent to study at the Catholic Stonyhurst College in Lancashire. He later taught mathematics and science at Stonyhurst, before training for the priesthood at St. Beuno's College in North Wales, leading to his ordination in 1892.

Cortie returned to Stonyhurst to teach, and spent the rest of his life serving the college. He had an interest in music and served as the college's director of music.

Cortie developed influenza in 1925, and his health deteriorated leading to his death some weeks later.

== Scientific work ==
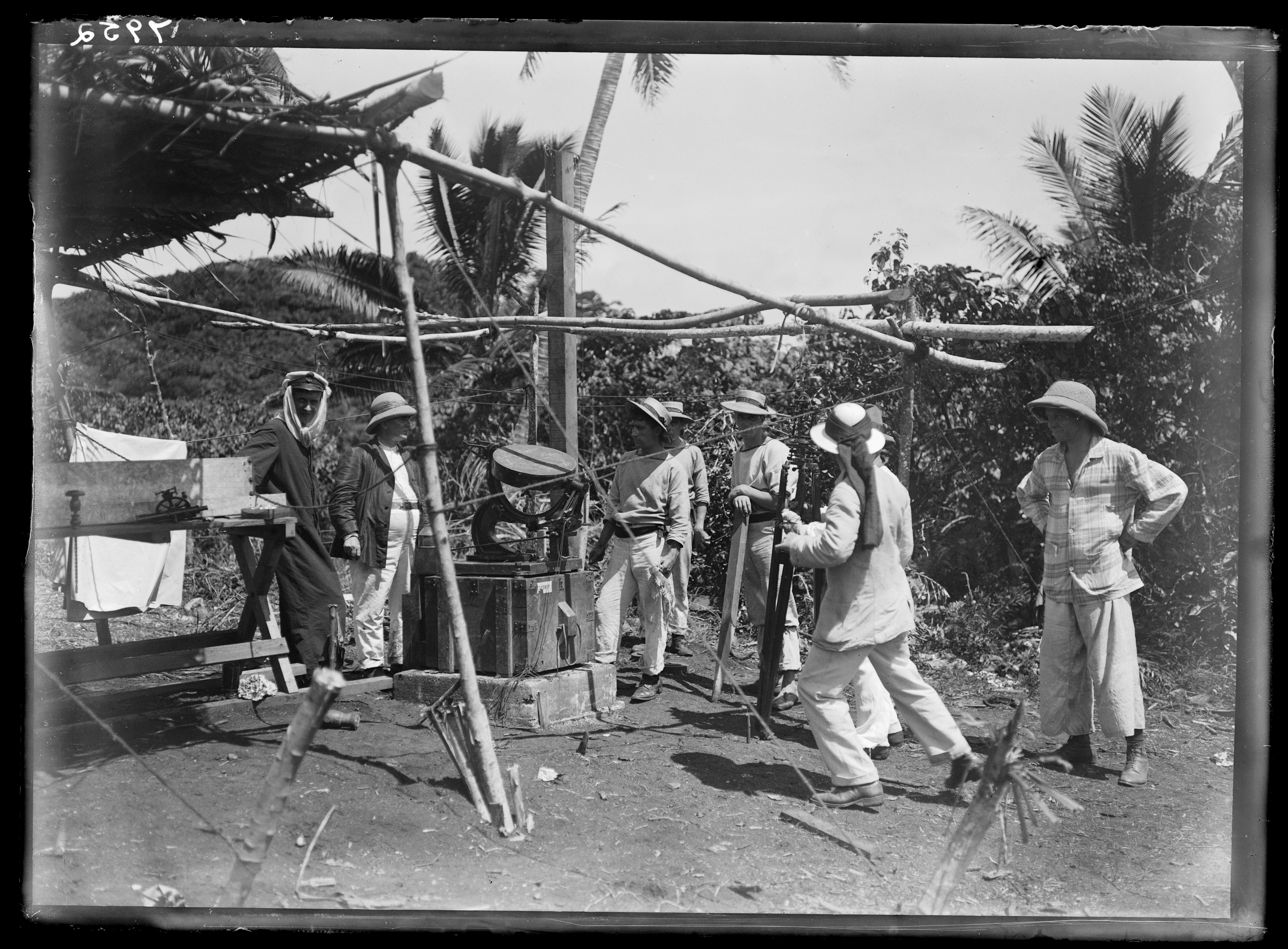
Cortie's coelostat during his visit to Vavaʻu, Tonga, to observe the Solar eclipse of April 28, 1911

Aloysius Cortie specialised in observing the Sun. He studied sunspots, making daily observations over many years from Stonyhurst whenever weather permitted. He studied the correlation between magnetic storms on the Earth and sunspots, eventually arguing that effects produced by the Sun, and associated with sunspots, extended outwards from the Sun in various directions and sometimes caused terrestrial magnetic storms.

Cortie also specialised in observing solar eclipses and took part in a number of eclipse expeditions. He travelled to Spain in 1905, to Tonga in 1911, and to Sweden in 1914. His main objective was to photograph the spectrum of the outer part of the Sun's atmosphere.

Cortie observed novae from the Stonyhurst College Observatory. He examined their spectra and measured the spectral lines that were visible.

Aloysius Cortie became a prominent member of the British astronomical community. He often gave popular lectures about science.

Cortie acted as director of the Stonyhurst College Observatory from the death of Walter Sidgreaves in 1919 until his own death in 1925.

He became director of the Solar Section of the British Astronomical Association following the death of Elizabeth Brown in 1899, and served until 1910. He was president of the Manchester Astronomical Society from 1911 to 1925. He was elected to the membership of Manchester Literary and Philosophical Society on 8 February 1921 and President in 1925. He was elected a fellow of the Royal Astronomical Society in 1891, and a fellow of the Royal Meteorological Society in 1924. He was appointed an associate of the Astronomical Society of Wales, a form of honorary membership.

Professional and academic associations
Preceded by Harold Baily Dixon	President of the Manchester Literary and Philosophical Society; 1925	Succeeded by Herbert Levinstein
Preceded by W. T. Hesketh	President of the Manchester Astronomical Society; 1911–25	Succeeded by A. A. Buss
