= Richard Buxton (botanist) =

British botanist (1785–1865)

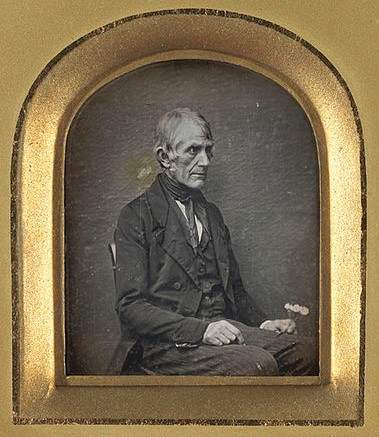
Richard Buxton aged 65, daguerreotype by John Benjamin Dancer (Note: Buxton was very reluctant to have his photograph taken but was "entrapped one morning after breakfast" by Edward Binney and John Benjamin Dancer. According to an article in the Manchester Guardian on 9 April 1877 the portrait was "not as good as might have been desired, but that arose from Buxton's repugnance to face the camera".)

Richard Buxton (15 January 1785 – 2 January 1865) (Note: Buxton wrote in his botanical guide that he was born on 15 January 1786 but his baptismal record at the Church of St Mary the virgin, Prestwich shows that he was baptised on 20 January 1785.) was a British shoemaker and amateur botanist. Born in Prestwich, Lancashire, to a family who lived in humble circumstances, he taught himself to read, and learned the basic principles of botany. Although living as a pauper for most of his life, in 1849 he published A Botanical Guide to the Flowering Plants, Ferns, Mosses and Algæ, Found Indigenous Within Sixteen Miles of Manchester, which became one of the standard texts on the flora then commonly found in the Manchester area. According to his obituary in the Journal of Botany, British and Foreign, Buxton was one of "nature's gentlemen" and "his true and correct pronunciation of scientific terms have caused many who heard him to believe he was an accomplished classical scholar". He was acknowledged by the geologist Edward William Binney as "the most profound thinker of his class".

== Early life ==
The second of seven children, Richard Buxton was born on 15 January 1785 at Sedgley Hall Farm in the parish of Prestwich, near Manchester, Lancashire. His parents were John and Anne Buxton (née Horton), both from Derbyshire. When he was two years old his family fell on hard times, left their farm and moved to Bond Street in Ancoats, Manchester. John Buxton worked as a labourer for the rest of his life.

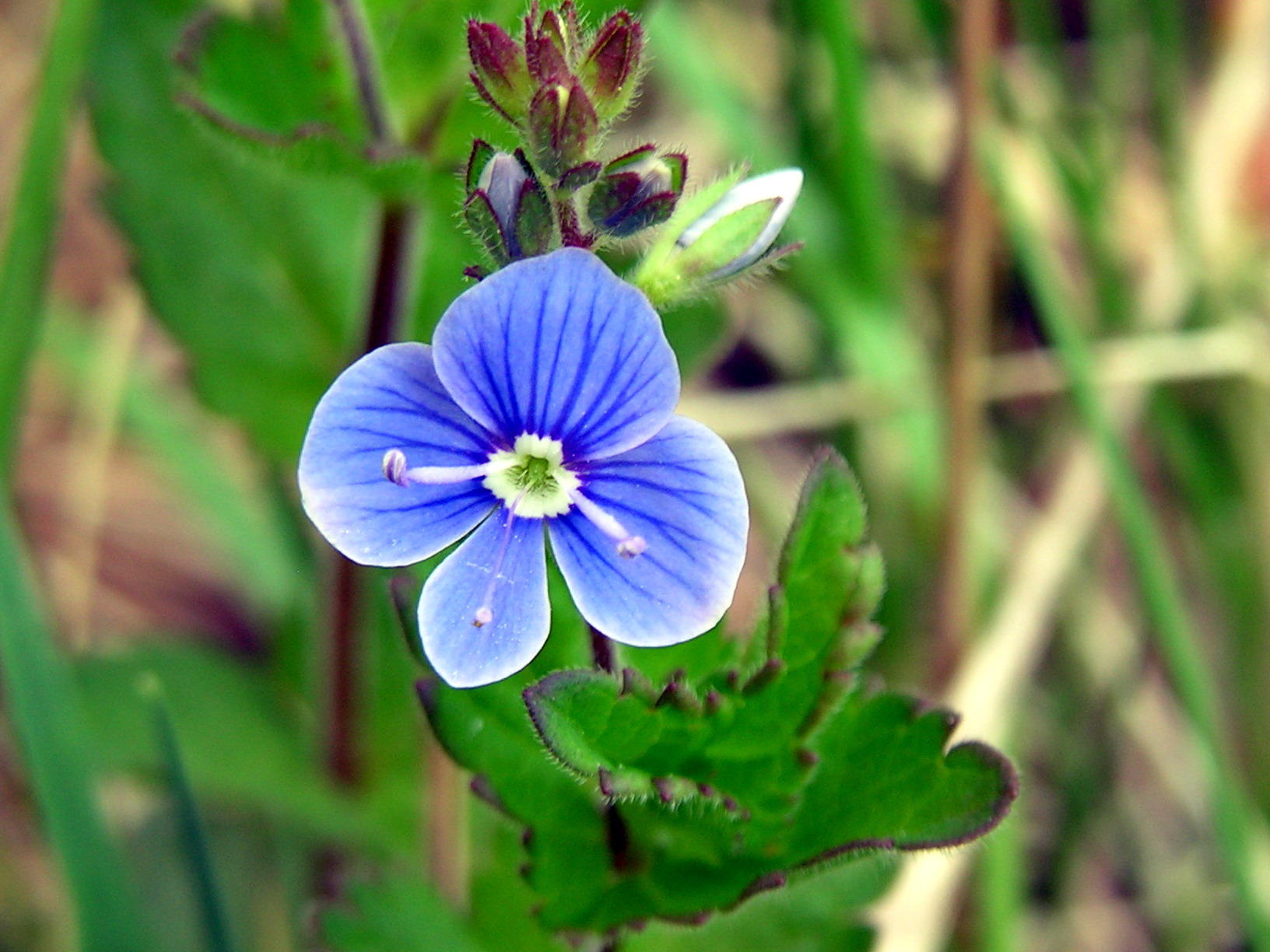
Veronica chamaedrys (Germander Speedwell)

Richard was a sickly child and his parents' reduced circumstances meant that his education was somewhat sporadic. In his early years he wandered through the fields and brick yards where he lived, picking wildflowers. His favourites were Germander Speedwell, Creeping Tormentil and Common Chickweed. At the age of twelve he was apprenticed to a bat maker (the maker of children's small leather shoes) named James Heap, in Port Street, Manchester. About 18 months later he went to work with James Hyde, with whom he stayed for a number of years.

== Later life ==
At the age of 16, Buxton was illiterate, but with the aid of The Common Spelling Book he taught himself to read. He was unable to understand or pronounce all words correctly and so procured a copy of Jones Pronouncing Dictionary. He read more books, such as A History of England and Goldsmith's History of Greece and Rome. Reading occupied all his spare time, although when trade was good he had to work from 6:00 am until 9:00 pm. He earned about 14 to 15 shillings (70p to 75p) a week, a good wage for the time, but as cloth was superseding leather in making the tops of children shoes, this did not last.

When he was 18, Buxton returned to work with his old master, James Heap, as a journeyman. Heap often took Buxton on country walks in his spare time. The two collected herbs for diet drinks, either for Heap's use or to share with his neighbours. They often found plants of whose names they were ignorant, and so Buxton bought a copy of Culpeper's Complete Herbal. However, as he found the supposedly medicinal properties of the plants fanciful and the descriptions inaccurate, he soon became dissatisfied with it. In 1808 he procured a copy of the superior Meyrick's Herbal, from which he learned the first principles of the Linnaean system. Buxton soon outgrew this book, and began to borrow or buy as many books on botany as he could. Botanical practice at the time was to collect and dry plants, but as he disliked dead plants and preferred not to remove specimens that could be enjoyed by others, his botanical studies were confined to making observations.

True, the pursuit of Botany has not yielded me much money — but what, in my opinion is far better, it has preserved my health, if not my life, and afforded me a fair share of happiness

— Richard Buxton

From 1821 to 1826 the pressures of work took him away from his botanical rambles, but in spring 1826 he made more frequent excursions. In June that year he was "botanising" on Kersal Moor when he met John Horsefield, a handloom weaver from Whitefield, who was president of the Prestwich Botanical Society and president of the general botanical meetings held at a number of different places in Lancashire. Buxton had long wished to meet a man such as Horsefield, who was not merely a country herbalist but an excellent scientific botanist. At that time in Lancashire many amateur, working class, naturalists pursued their interests in their spare time, and a number of local societies had been formed. Horsefield introduced him to other local botanists such as James Percival, Thomas Heywood and John Shaw with whom, during the summer of 1826, he made a number of excursions to Mere Clough in Prestwich, Clifton Moss and Baguley Moor.

For several years, for a variety of reasons, Buxton's study of botany fell by the wayside, but in 1833 he attended a botanical meeting in Prestwich, where he met his old acquaintances. He became a regular attendee at local botanical meetings, including one at Blackley, where he met James Crowther. They became firm friends and, in search of plants, explored Chorlton, Withington, Didsbury and many other regions of Lancashire, Cheshire, Derbyshire, Yorkshire and Wales.

In 1839 Buxton was invited to join the natural history class at the Manchester Mechanics' Institute where he helped compile the Flora Mancuniensis (1840) along with Leo Hartley Grindon, George Crozier and James Crowther under the editorship of John Bland Wood. He became an acknowledged expert on mosses, and William Hooker, director of the Royal Botanic Gardens, Kew was so impressed with his skills that he hoped to employ him as a herbarium assistant. Although this never came about, Hooker gave Buxton a number of botanical books and, at some point, Buxton accepted the position of President of the Manchester Working Men's Botanical Society.

In 1849, aged 62, he published a book: A Botanical Guide to the Flowering Plants, Ferns, Mosses and Algæ, Found Indigenous Within Sixteen Miles of Manchester, written with the help of other local botanists and geologist Edward William Binney. Peppered with snatches of poetry and including some autobiographical details, the book gives a complete description of all the plants then found in the area. It encourages other working-class people to explore the "many delightful walks by pleasant streams and through green woods in summertime" and requests landowners "at least to preserve the old footpaths which cross their fields and woods if they should decline to allow fresh ones to be made".

As Buxton's trade fell into decline he tried to survive by working as a botanical collector and delivering newspapers, but eventually had to rely on a fund set up by Binney for 'the relief and encouragement of scientific men in humble life'. This situation was compounded when the proceeds from the second edition of his book, published in 1859, were less than anticipated because of competition from Grindon's Manchester Flora published in the same year.

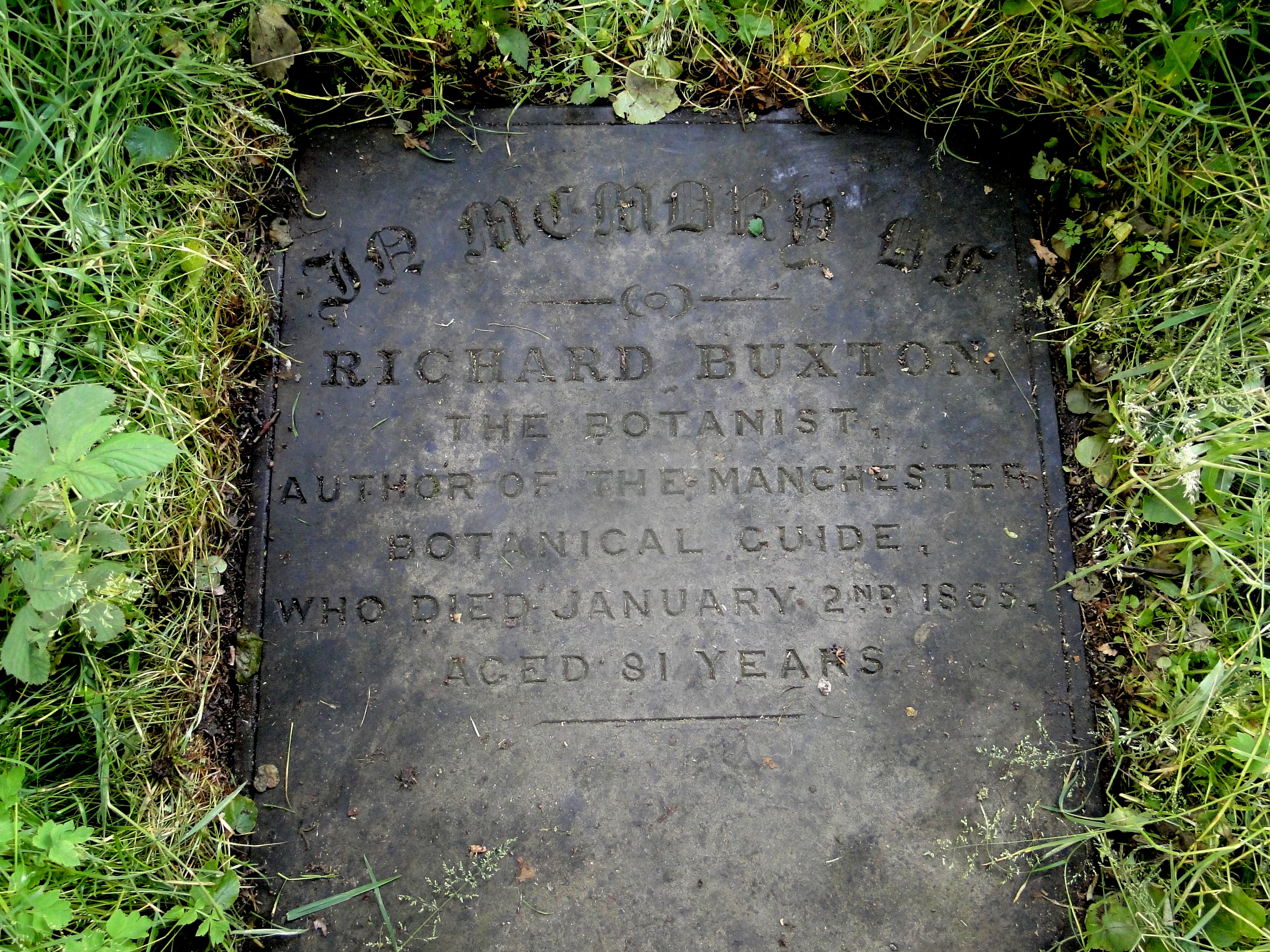
Richard Buxton's grave

== Death ==
Buxton died on 2 January 1865 at Limekiln Lane, Ardwick, aged 79 (Note: On his gravestone his age is given as 81 but he actually died diedshortly before his 80th birthday.) and was buried at the Church of St Mary the Virgin, Prestwich, on 5 January. In his obituary in the Manchester Courier, an unnamed "eminent man of science" described him as "probably one of the best British botanists, so far as flowering plants are concerned, that Lancashire has produced".
