= Besses United Reformed Church =

Church in Besses o' th' Barn, England

Coordinates: 53°32′56.92″N 2°17′38.18″W

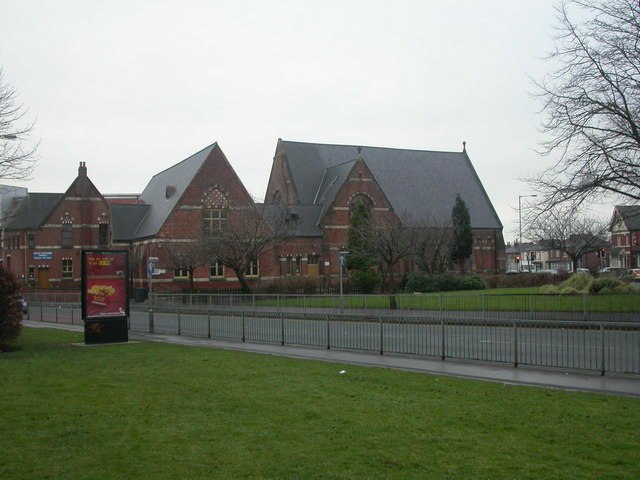
Besses United Reformed Church

Besses United Reformed Church is designated a Grade II building by Historic England. It is situated between Bury New Road and Bury Old Road at Besses o' th' Barn, an area of Whitefield, Greater Manchester, England.

As of May 2025, the building is owned by Manchester Chinese Christian Church, and the Eternal Grace Cantonese-speaking congregation which previously met at a Salvation Army building is based at the church.

== Origins ==
Besses United Reformed Church was built to serve the Congregational denomination of nonconformist Christians and was originally known as Besses Congregational Church. The United Kingdom Congregationalists and the Presbyterian Church of England merged in the 1970s to form the United Reformed Church.

The population of Besses o' th' Barn around the time of construction was approximately 8000 and, according to those involved with the church, "the means of spiritual instruction [of that population] was very scanty". The building is a bicentenary memorial erected to commemorate the secession from the established Church of England in 1662.

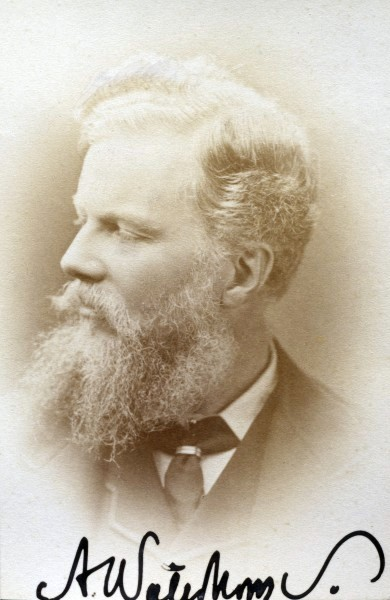
Alfred Waterhouse, architect

The structure was designed in the Gothic Revival style by Alfred Waterhouse. His design allowed for a chapel capable of holding 823 people, ancillary buildings such as the vestry, and a schoolroom on the upper storey. The latter measured 78 feet (24 m) by 33 feet (10 m) and was expected to accommodate between 500 and 600 children. The local school at that time had a roll of 200, of which 70-80 were adults.

The foundation stone was laid in 1863, when the projected cost of construction was £3700-£4000. Around three-quarters of that sum had been raised when construction began. £1000 was provided by the Lancashire Congregational Union, although it is uncertain whether that sum was included in the amount raised or was additional to it.

Construction was completed in 1865. Services had been held since 1863 and until 1866 the congregation was closely associated with Stand Independent Chapel, whose minister, Alexander Anderson, provided pastoral care. This arrangement ended when a separate church was formed, and within two or three years the church was able to support itself without recourse to the Union.

== Ministers ==
The early ministers were:

- Alexander Anderson, until 1866
- Osric Copland, 1866–1869
- Llewellyn Porter, 1871–1877 (Note: The arrangements for ministration between 1869, when Osric Copland left office, and 1871, when Llewellyn Porter succeeded him, are uncertain.)
- H. H. Richardson, 1877–1880

== Listed building ==
The church was first listed by English Heritage in January 1985. The short registry entry describes it as

Gothic revival. A low, spreading complex, conspicuously sited at fork between Old and New Bury Roads. Red brick with bands, window heads, tympana etc in other colours. Steep slate roofs. Dated 1865 in head of gable front, which has stone plate-tracery rose window under 2 centred arch. Short transepts have similar gables. Beyond east end the associated buildings present steep gables, one to north, two to south.
