= Stand, Greater Manchester =

Coordinates: 53.546°N 2.310°W

Stand
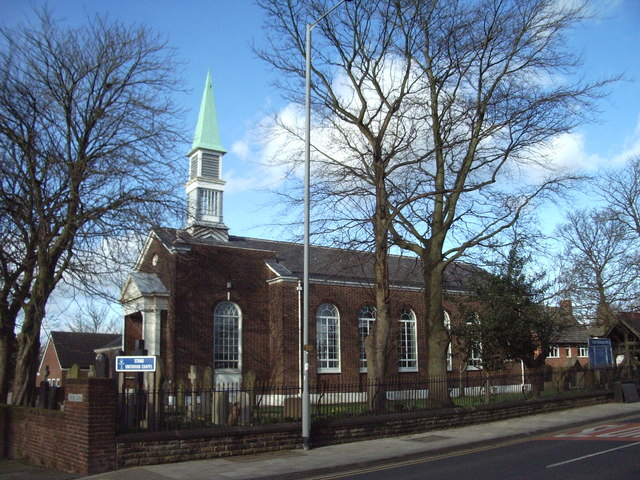
- Stand Unitarian Chapel

- Location within Greater Manchester
- OS grid reference: SD794055
- Metropolitan borough: Bury
- Metropolitan county: Greater Manchester
- Region: North West
- Country: England
- Sovereign state: United Kingdom
- Post town: MANCHESTER
- Postcode district: M45
- Dialling code: 0161
- Police: Greater Manchester
- Fire: Greater Manchester
- Ambulance: North West
- UK Parliament: Bury South

Stand is a residential area in Whitefield, Greater Manchester, England. The name is derived from a hunting stand, from which the surrounding countryside could be scanned for animals hunted as game.

Stand Old Hall, built on the highest point in Whitefield overlooking Pilkington Deer Park (now the junction of Stand Lane and Ringley Road) was the manor house of the Pilkington family, Lords of the Manor of Pilkington and Bury. Stand Old Hall was replaced by Stand Hall around 1515 after the Earl of Derby took control of Pilkington. The old hall was converted into a barn and in the 19th century it became a shippon (cowshed). The old hall fell into disrepair and was demolished in the early 1960s. The view from Stand Hall was described in 1806.

All Saints' Church on Church Lane is a Grade I Listed Anglican parish church designed by Charles Barry and built between 1821 and 1826.

Stand Grammar School was founded in 1688 under the will of Henry Siddall and had close connections with the Unitarian Chapel in Ringley Road. The school ran into financial difficulties in the early 20th century and was taken over by Lancashire Education Committee in 1908. A new school was built on Church Lane on seven acres of land bought from the Earl of Derby and opened on 6 September 1913. The school catered for both boys and girls until 1937 when a separate girls' school was opened on Higher Lane. The boys' school continued to develop with 700 pupils on roll and eventually became part of Bury College and was demolished in 2001.

Some believe Robert Clive had links with the school in his early years. Accounts suggest that the Old Standians’ Association began attempts to link Clive to the school some time around 1907. Sir Colvin Bayley (the grandson of Clive’s uncle) stated at a school event that he had been informed Clive had attended the school, prior to living in Hope Hall in Eccles. However, this link has been queried, as even as Bayley admitted, there is no mention of it in any records. Despite this, the Old Standians' Association erected a bronze plaque and named one of the school's houses in his honour in 1913.

Some of the alternative rock band Elbow met whilst studying at Stand College in the 1990s. Stand Grammar School for Girls on Higher lane was later renamed Philips High School and is now a comprehensive school and specialist maths and computing college.
