= Manchester Astronomical Society =

British organization

- Abbreviation: MAS
- Formation: 18 September 1903; 123 years ago
- Legal status: Society
- Purpose: To promote and encourage an educational and popular interest in the science of astronomy.
- Headquarters: Schuster Laboratory
- Location: Manchester, England
- Official language: English
- President (33rd): G. Hodson
- Affiliations: British Astronomical Association; Society for the History of Astronomy; Federation of Astronomical Societies; Northwest Group of Astronomical Societies
- Website: manastro.org

The Manchester Astronomical Society is an organisation that promotes popular and amateur astronomy in North West England. It is one of the oldest provincial astronomical societies in England. The society is based in the Blackett Lecture Theatre located in the Schuster Building, University of Manchester, in Manchester city centre. Membership is open to anyone with an interest in astronomy.

== History ==
The society's origins lay in the North Western Branch of the British Astronomical Association, which was established in 1892 (soon after the association's formation in 1890). However, a number of members gradually became dissatisfied with the association's treatment of the branch (particularly in relation to funding) and the Branch's members consequently decided to dissolve the branch to form the Manchester Astronomical Society at a meeting at the Godlee Observatory in September 1903. Rev. Thomas H. Core was elected as the society's inaugural president.

The society held regular lectures. The membership numbered 98 by the end of the first session.

The society attracted some prominent scientists to give lectures, including Arthur Rambaut, Ralph Sampson and Sir Arthur Eddington. The Stonyhurst College astronomer Aloysius Cortie served as President (1911–25). Notable members included the telescope maker John Hindle and the proponent of spaceflight Eric Burgess.

Manchester academics and students often lectured to the society, including figures such as Zdeněk Kopal, Sir Bernard Lovell, Leon Lucy and Wal Sargent.

== Meetings ==
The society meets regularly on Thursday evenings in the Godlee Observatory, with the exception of Public Lecture evenings (see below) and the Christmas closure of the university building. These meetings consist of observing using the telescopes (weather permitting), informal talks and discussion sessions.

The society hosts public lectures on astronomy on the third Thursday of the month between October and March in the John Dalton Building, Manchester Metropolitan University, Oxford Road, Manchester. They are generally given by invited speakers, although the December lecture is traditionally given by the president of the society and is held in the Godlee Observatory.

The society holds its annual general meeting on the third Thursday of April in the Godlee Observatory.

== Presidents ==
- 1903–04 Rev. Thomas H. Core
- 1904–07 E. T. Whitelow
- 1907–10 J. Watson
- 1910–11 W. T. Hesketh
- 1911–25 Rev. Aloysius L. Cortie
- 1925–28 A. A. Buss
- 1928–31 W. Porthouse
- 1931–35 L. H. A.Carr
- 1935–37 Rev. J. P. Rowland
- 1937–45 H. L. Dilks
- 1945–48 E. D. Sherlock
- 1948–58 J. C. Farrer
- 1958–64 S. W. R. Mottram
- 1964–66 K. Bispham
- 1967–70 A. Whittaker
- 1970–73 T. Hill
- 1973–76 M. Duckworth
- 1976–78 K. Brierley
- 1978–80 K. J. Kilburn
- 1980–81 P. Mack
- 1981–82 K. J. Kilburn
- 1982–85 S. J. Hodgkinson
- 1985–86 K. Davis
- 1986–89 J. K. Bolton
- 1989–91 R. Brierley
- 1991–93 K. J. Kilburn
- 1993–97 A. W. Cross
- 1997–2000 R. Brierley
- 2000–03 G. D. Duckworth
- 2003–09 G. A. Hodson
- 2009–13 Dr B. Henshall
- 2013–19 A. Jennings
- 2019–present G. A. Hodson

== See also ==
- List of astronomical societies
