= List of companies of the United Kingdom K–Z =

The United Kingdom of Great Britain and Northern Ireland, commonly known as the United Kingdom (UK or U.K.) or Britain, is a sovereign country located off the northwestern coast of the European mainland. It includes the island of Great Britain, the northeastern part of the island of Ireland, and many smaller islands. The United Kingdom consists of four constituent countries: England, Scotland, Wales and Northern Ireland.

The United Kingdom has a highly developed social market economy. In 2026, the United Kingdom is the fifth-largest national economy in the world measured by nominal gross domestic product (GDP), tenth-largest by purchasing power parity (PPP), and about 21st by nominal GDP per capita, constituting 3.38% of world GDP and 2.13% by purchasing power parity (PPP).

The United Kingdom has one of the most globalised economies and comprises England, Scotland, Wales and Northern Ireland. In 2022, the United Kingdom was the fifth-largest exporter of goods and services in the world and the fourth-largest importer. It also had the fourth-largest outward foreign direct investment, and the fifteenth-largest inward foreign direct investment. In 2022, the United Kingdom's trade with the European Union accounted for 42% of the country's exports and 48% of its total imports. The United Kingdom has a highly efficient and strong social security system, which comprises roughly 24.5% of GDP.

The service sector dominates, contributing 82% of GDP; the financial services industry is particularly important, and London is the second-largest financial centre in the world. Edinburgh was ranked 17th in the world, and 6th in Europe for its financial services industry in 2021. The United Kingdom's technology sector has an enterprise value of US$1.2 trillion, with fintech, health technology, and semiconductors accounting for 48% of the value. The aerospace industry in the United Kingdom is the second-largest national aerospace industry. Its pharmaceutical industry plays an important role in the economy. Of the world's 500 largest companies, 20 are headquartered in the UK, with combined global revenues of US$1.45 trillion. The economy is boosted by North Sea oil and gas production; its proven reserves were estimated at 2.9 billion barrels in 2024, although it has been a net importer of oil since 2005. There are significant regional variations in prosperity, with South East England and North East Scotland being the richest areas per capita. The size of London's economy makes it the biggest city by GDP in Europe. In 2022, the UK spent around 2.8% of GDP on research and development.

In the 18th century, Britain was the first nation to industrialise. During the 19th century, through its expansive colonial empire and technological superiority, Britain had a preeminent role in the global economy, accounting for 9.1% of the world's GDP in 1870. The Second Industrial Revolution was also taking place rapidly in the United States and the German Empire; this presented an increasing economic challenge for the UK, leading into the 20th century. The cost of fighting both the First and Second World Wars further weakened the UK's relative position. During the Great Recession of 2008, the UK economy suffered a significant decline, followed by a period of weak growth and stagnation. Slow growth continued following UK's exit from the EU in 2020, which damaged longer-term growth. The UK economy has also been affected by the 2020 coronavirus pandemic.

== Largest companies ==
This list shows the UK companies in the Fortune Global 500 list for 2025 which ranks firms by total revenues. Only the top five firms are included as a sample.

Rank	Image	Name	2024 revenues (USD $M)	Staff	Notes
18		Shell	$289m	96,000	British multinational oil, gas, and renewable energy company including exploration, production, refining, transport, distribution and marketing, petrochemicals, power generation, trading, biofuels, wind power, energy-kite, and hydrogen power. It was established in 1907, and is headquartered in London, and incorporated in the UK. It was formerly known as Royal Dutch Petroleum Co, and The Shell Transport and Trading Company of the United Kingdom.
33		BP	$194m	100,000	British multinational oil, gas, and renewable energy company including exploration and production, refining, distribution and marketing, petrochemicals, power generation and trading, biofuels, wind power and solar technology. It was established in 1909, and is headquartered in London. It was formerly known as Anglo-Persian Oil Company, Anglo-Iranian Oil Company, and BP Amaco plc.
56		HSBC Holdings	$145m	211,000	British multinational investment bank and financial services holding company. It was first established in 1865 in British Hong Kong, but is now headquartered in London. Former names include The Hong Kong and Shanghai Bank, and The Hong Kong and Shanghai Banking Corporation.
129		Tesco	$89m	229,000	British multinational grocery and general merchandise retailer, petrol retailer, software provider and financial services provider. It was first established in 1919 in Hackney, London, first named Tesco in 1924, and is now headquartered in Welwyn Garden City, Hertfordshire.
179		Lloyds Banking Group	$73m	61,000	British financial services company offering banking, life assurance, and pensions. Its headquarters are in London and its registered office is in Edinburgh. It was formed through the acquisition of HBOS by Lloyds TSB in 2009. It was formerly TSB Group Public Limited Company from 1985 to 1995, and Lloyds TSB Group plc from 1995 to 2009.

== Notable companies ==
This is a list of companies of the United Kingdom as well as those first established in the United Kingdom that are no longer British owned, and also including defunct UK companies. Only companies with articles in Wikipedia are included.

== K ==
- Kaos Films – is a film production company. It formerly held film competitions. It was established in 2001.
- Kainos – is a computer software company that provides information technology services and consulting for government departments and agencies, businesses, and organisations. It is headquartered in Belfast, Northern Ireland. It was founded in 1986 as a joint venture between Fujitsu and Queen's University of Belfast. Since then the ownership has changed. In 2022 its revenue was £302 million, with a net income of £35 million.
- Kays of Scotland – is a manufacturer of curling stones based in Mauchline, Scotland. It was founded in 1851 by William Kay and sons Andrew and Thomas. It is owned by the Wylie family.
- Keen City – is a film and television production company. Established in 2008, its headquarters is in London.
- Keepmoat – is a house building company headquartered in Doncaster, South Yorkshire. It was founded in 1931 by George Bramall and Dick Ogden as Bramall & Ogden. After acquiring Frank Haslam Milan in 1983 it was renamed Keepmoat. In 2012 it was merged with social housing provider Apollo. In 2014 it was acquired by TDR Capital and Sun Capital Partners. In 2021 it was acquired by Aermont Capital. In 2020 its revenue was £406 million, with a net income loss of £14 million.
- Keith and Dufftown Railway – was a railway company established in 1857 that operated from 1862 to 1866 when it was absorbed into the Great North of Scotland Railway.
- Kelda Group – is a utility company (water and sewage). Established in 1989, its headquarters is in Bradford, Yorkshire. Its subsidiaries are Yorkshire Water and Kelda Water Services.
- Keller Group – is a geotechnical engineering company headquartered in London. It was established in the 1950s as the ground engineering division of GKN. In 1975 it acquired the German company Johann Keller and was renamed Keller. In 1990 it was the subject of a management buyout from GKN. Its subsidiaries include: Cyntech, GEO-Instruments, Suncoast Post-Tension, Moretrench Industrial, and Phi Group. In 2022 its revenue was £2.9 billion, with a net income of £45 million.
- Kelvin Valley Railway – was a railway company established in 1873. It operated from 1878 with the line worked by the North British Railway who absorbed it in 1885.
- Kenley Water Company – was a utility company (water supply) until 1885. In 1885 it merged with Caterham Springwater Company to form the East Surrey Water Company.
- Kent Reliance – is the trading name of OneSavings Bank plc.
- KeolisAmey Wales – trading as Transport for Wales Rail Services was a train operating company owned by KeolisAmey that worked the Wales & Borders franchise from 14 October 2018 to 6 February 2021. It ran most of the services in Wales, including all Welsh stations, as well as some services in North West England, West Midlands and Gloucestershire. The Welsh Government body Transport for Wales awarded the Wales & Borders franchise to KeolisAmey in 2018. It was to have run for 15 years but due to the COVID-19 pandemic the franchise became financially unviable and was nationalised by the Welsh Government in February 2021. Operations were transferred from KeolisAmey to Transport for Wales Rail. Amey Keolis Infrastructure continued to be involved in some infrastructure projects such as the South Wales Metro.
- Kier Group – is a construction, civil engineering, support services, and property management company. It is headquartered in Manchester. It was founded in 1928 by Jorgen Lotz and Olaf Kier as Lotz & Kier, based in Stoke-on-Trent. After Lotz left the company it was renamed J.L. Kier & Co Ltd. It first specialised in concrete engineering before expanding into general contracting and house building. In 1963 it was floated on the London Stock Exchange. In 1973 it was merged with W. & C. French to form French Kier, which was acquired by Beazer in 1986. Hanson bought Beazer in 1991 and then, in 1992, the contracting division known as Kier was the subject of a management buyout. Kier re-entered the housing market with a number of acquisitions and was floated on the London Stock Exchange in 1996. It then expanded its construction, support services, and property management businesses. In 2021 its house building division Kier Living was acquired by Terra Firma Capital Partners and rebranded as Tilia Homes. In 2022 the revenue of Kier Group was £3.2 billion, with a net income of £12 million.
- Kilchoman distillery – is a producer of Scotch whisky located on Islay, Scotland. It was founded in 2005 by Anthony Wills.
- Killin Railway – was a railway company established in 1882 that operated from 1886 with the Caledonian Railway working the line. In 1923 it was absorbed into the London, Midland and Scottish Railway.
- Kilmarnock and Troon Railway – was a railway company established in 1808 that began operating in 1812 as a plateway with horse-pulled wagons. From 1841 it operated as a railway which, in 1846, was leased to the Glasgow, Paisley, Kilmarnock and Ayr Railway. In 1899 the line was bought by the Glasgow and South Western Railway.
- Kimbolton Fireworks – was a manufacturer of display fireworks based in Kimbolton, Cambridgeshire. It was founded in 1964 by Ronald Lancaster. It ceased trading in 2019 but the brand name is used by Phoenix Fireworks, and Celtic Fireworks.
- Kindle Entertainment – is a television production company. Established in 2007, its headquarters is in London.
- Kingfisher – is a multinational retail company with subsidiaries including B&Q, Castorama, Brico Dépôt and Screwfix. It was established in 1982 as Paternoster Stores in order to buyout the British Woolworths chain after which it became Woolworth Holdings. Its acquisition of Woolworths Ltd included B&Q. Further acquisitions included Superdrug and Comet which were sold in the 2000s. In 1989 it was renamed 'Kingfisher plc'. In 1999 it acquired Screwfix, and other acquisitions include Castorama and Brico Dépôt. Woolworths was demerged in 2001. Headquartered in London, its 2022 revenue was £13.1 billion, with a net income of £843 million.
- Kingdom Bank – is a Christian bank offering mortgages, savings, loans, and insurance to individuals, churches, charities, and businesses. Headquartered in Beeston, Nottinghamshire; it was founded in 2005 as a subsidiary of the charity Assemblies of God Property Trust. In 2019 it was acquired by a group of Christian philanthropists.
- Kington and Eardisley Railway – was a railway company established in 1862. It took over the Kington Tramway and converted it to a railway. It operated from 1874 to 1897 when the line was absorbed by the Great Western Railway.
- Kington Tramway – was a horse-drawn tramway established in 1818 that operated from 1820 to 1862 when it was acquired by the Kington and Eardisley Railway.
- KP Snacks – is a manufacturer of crisps, nuts, popcorn, and other snacks. It was founded in 1853 in Rotherham, South Yorkshire as Kenyon & Son. Its headquarters is in Slough, Berkshire. Since December 2012 it is owned by Intersnack.
- Kroo Bank – is an online bank headquartered in London. It was established in 2018 as B-Social.

== L ==
- La Fauxmagerie – is a cheesemonger offering vegan cheeses including its own brand, cheese accompaniments, wine, and beer. It operates a retail store, and retail website. It is headquartered in Shoreditch, London. It was founded in 2019 by sisters Rachel and Charlotte Stevens.
- Ladbrokes Coral – is a gambling company. Established in 1886 in Warwickshire, its headquarters is in London. It was previously known as Ladbrokes, and as Hilton Group plc when it owned Hilton hotels and branding outside of the United States. In 2016 it acquired Gala Coral Group and became Ladbrokes Coral. It is owned by Entain.
- Lagonda – is a manufacturing company (luxury automobiles). Established in 1906, its headquarters is in Staines-upon-Thames, Middlesex. It also produced shells, guns and other weapons during WWI, and WWII. In 1947 it was bought by Aston Martin.
- Laing O'Rourke – is a multinational construction company headquartered in Dartford. Its operations include: building construction, infrastructure construction, investment and development, modular manufacturing, engineering, and support services. It was founded in 1978 by Ray O'Rourke and his brother Des as a specialist concrete subcontractor named R.O'Rourke & Sons. In 2001 it acquired Laing Construction from John Laing plc and was renamed Laing O'Rourke.
- Lakeland – is a company that operates a retail store chain, catalogue business, and retail website offering kitchenware and other household products. It is headquartered in Windermere, Cumbria. It was founded in 1956 by Alan Rayner as a business supplying farmers with agricultural plastics and home-freezing products, that became Lakeland Plastics. It later specialised in kitchenware and was renamed Lakeland Ltd in 1997.
- Lambeth Waterworks Company – was a utility company (water) from 1785 to 1903. Headquartered in London, it became part of the Metropolitan Water Board.
- Lambourn Valley Railway – was a railway company established in 1883 to make a line from Newbury, Berkshire to Lambourn. It operated from 1898 to 1905 when the line was acquired by the Great Western Railway.
- Lambton Collieries – was a coal mining company from 1896 to 1947. Headquartered in County Durham, it became part of the National Coal Board.
- Lanarkshire and Ayrshire Railway – was a railway company established in 1883 as the Barrmill and Kilwinning Railway then renamed the next year as the Lanarkshire and Ayrshire Railway. The line was worked by the Caledonian Railway which gained a shorter route for mineral traffic from the coalfields of Lanarkshire to Ardrossan Harbour, Scotland. It operated from 1888 to 1923 when it was absorbed by the London, Midland and Scottish Railway.
- Lanarkshire and Dumbartonshire Railway – was a railway company established in 1891 to connect Balloch and Dumbarton with central Glasgow while linking in heavy industry on the north bank of the River Clyde. It opened in stages from 1894 to 1896 with the Caledonian Railway working the line. In 1909 it was absorbed by the Caledonian Railway.
- Lancashire and Yorkshire Railway – was a railway company operating from 1847 to 1922.
- Landmark Mortgages – is a financial services company formerly known as Northern Rock. It was initially a building society from 1965 to 2012. Headquartered in Gosforth, Newcastle upon Tyne, it was formed by the merger of the Northern Counties Permanent Building Society with the Rock Building Society. It was nationalised in 2008, and in 2010 it was mainly subsumed by Virgin Money UK with the exception of the high risk mortgage book which was renamed Northern Rock and remained nationalised until 2016 when it was sold to Cerberus Capital Management.
- Landsec – is a commercial property development and investment company. Established in 1944, its headquarters is in London. In 2019 its revenue was £748 million, with net income of £119 million.
- Lauder Light Railway – was a railway company established in 1898 to build a line connecting Lauder in Berwickshire with the main line of the Waverley Route at Fountainhall. It opened in 1901 with the North British Railway working the line. In 1923 the line was absorbed into the London and North Eastern Railway.
- Laurence Olivier Productions – was a stage and film production company established in the 1950s.
- Law Debenture – is an investment trust headquartered in London. It also provides fiduciary services for pension funds, trusts, and companies. It was founded in 1899 by Stanley Boulter. In 2022 its revenue was £89 million, with a net income of £43 million.
- Layton Sports Cars – is a former name of TVR.
- Leadburn, Linton and Dolphinton Railway – was a railway company established in 1862 to make a line from Leadburn, Scottish Borders to Linton and Dolphinton. It operated from 1864 to 1866 when it was absorbed into the North British Railway.
- Leatherhead and District Water – was a utility company (water supply) from 1883 to 1927. It became part of East Surrey Water Company.
- Leeds, Bradford and Halifax Junction Railway – was a railway company established in 1852 to build a line from Bradford, West Yorkshire to Leeds. It also had running powers over the Lancashire and Yorkshire Railway to Halifax. The main line opened in 1854 with a number of branch lines opening later. The line was worked by the Great Northern Railway who absorbed it in 1865.
- Leeds Building Society – is a building society offering mortgages, savings, investments, and insurance. It is headquartered in Leeds, West Yorkshire. It originated in 1845 as the Leeds Union Operative Land and Building Society. In 1875 it was registered as the Leeds and Holbeck (Permanent) Building Society. In 2005 it was renamed the Leeds Building Society, and in 2006 was merged with the Mercantile Building Society.
- Leek United Building Society (trading as Leek Building Society) – is a building society offering mortgages, savings, investments, loans, and insurance. It is headquartered in Leek, Staffordshire. It was founded in 1863 as the Leek United Permanent Benefit Building Society. Its name was changed to Leek United & Midlands Building Society in 1919, and then to Leek United Building Society in 1990.
- Lees of Scotland – also known as Lees of Scotland is a manufacturer of confectionery and cakes. It was established in 1931 in Coatbridge, Scotland by John Justice Lees and is still headquartered there. In 1982 Lees established Heather Cameron Foods to produce meringues, later merging it into the Lees brand. In 1987 Lees acquired Gainsborough Chocolates and Fullers of Greenoch. In 1991 Lees was acquired by Northumbrian Fine Foods before returning to independent Scottish ownership in 1993.
- Left Bank Pictures – is a film and television production company. Established in 2007, its headquarters is in London. Its parent company is Sony Pictures Entertainment.
- Legal & General – is a British multinational financial services and asset management company. It offers investment management, mortgages, pensions, annuities, and life assurance. It also offered general insurance before the sale of Legal & General Insurance to Allianz Insurance in 2020. Established in 1836 in London as The New Law Life Assurance Society it was later renamed as Legal & General. Still headquartered in London, it has total assets of £570.5 billion as of 2020. Its revenue in 2020 was £50.2 billion, with a net income of £1.2 billion.
- Leven Railway – was a railway company established in 1852 that operated from 1854 to 1861 when it was amalgamated with the East of Fife Railway to form the Leven and East of Fife Railway.
- Leven and East of Fife Railway – was a railway company established in 1861 from the amalgamation of the Leven Railway with the East of Fife Railway. It operated from 1863 to 1877 when it was absorbed into the North British Railway.
- Lex Records – is a record label company. Established in 2001, its headquarters is in Camden, London. It was originally an imprint of Warp Records.
- Lightning Car Company – is a sports car development company. Established in 2007 in Fulham and Peterborough, its headquarters is in Coventry.
- Limpsfield and Oxted Water Company – was a utility company (water supply) from 1888 to 1930.
- LifeBook Memoirs – publishes privately commissioned autobiographies and memoirs. It is based in Godalming, Surrey.
- Linda McCartney Foods – is a producer of vegetarian, and vegan foods such as chilled or frozen meat alternative burgers, sausages, sausage rolls, meatballs, stir fry, pastas, and pies. It was founded in 1991 by Linda McCartney. It was acquired by United Biscuits in 1996; H. J. Heinz in 1999; and the Hain Celestial Group in 2006.
- Lionsgate UK – is a film production and distribution company. Established in 1997, it was formerly Redbus Film Distribution, and Helkon SK. It is now a subsidiary of Lionsgate Studios.
- Liontrust Asset Management – is an asset management company headquartered in London. It was founded in 1995. In 2016 it acquired Alliance Trust Investment Management, and, in 2019, acquired Neptune Investment Management. In 2022 its revenue was £245 million, with a net income of £59 million.
- Liskeard and Caradon Railway – was a railway company established in 1843 to carry minerals from Caradon Hill, Cornwall to Moorswater for onward transport on the Liskeard and Looe Union Canal and from 1860 the Liskeard and Looe Railway to Looe harbour. Opening in 1844, at first the line was operated by gravity and horse traction. Locomotives were introduced from 1862 and it was agreed that the company would also work the Liskeard and Looe Railway line. Extra branch lines were made to new mines and passenger traffic was enabled. The company went into receivership in 1886 and, in 1909, the line was bought by the Great Western Railway.
- Lister Motor Company – is a manufacturing company (sports cars). Established in 1954 in Cambridge, it was formerly known as George Lister Engineering Limited.
- Liverpool and Bury Railway – was a railway company established in 1845 to make a line between Liverpool and Bury via Kirkby, Wigan and Bolton. In 1846 it was acquired by the Manchester and Leeds Railway which, in 1847, became part of the Lancashire and Yorkshire Railway. The line opened in 1848.
- Liverpool, Crosby and Southport Railway – was a railway company established in 1847 to build a line between Liverpool, Crosby and Southport. In 1848 a line was opened between Southport and Waterloo, Merseyside and in 1850 extended into Liverpool. From October 1850 to March 1854 the line was leased to the Lancashire and Yorkshire Railway. Then the LC&SR resumed running the line until June 1855 when it was acquired by the L&YR.
- Liverpool Hydraulic Power Company – was an energy company using hydraulic power generation and supply from 1888 to 1971. It was located in Liverpool.
- Liverpool, Southport and Preston Junction Railway – was a railway company established in 1884 to connect the West Lancashire Railway lines to the north of Southport to the Southport & Cheshire Lines Extension Railway at Altcar and Hillhouse railway station. It operated from 1887 to 1897 when it was absorbed into the Lancashire and Yorkshire Railway.
- Liverpool, St Helens and South Lancashire Railway – was a railway company established in 1885 as the St Helens and Wigan Junction Railway. In 1889 it was renamed the Liverpool, St Helens and South Lancashire Railway. It made a line from St Helens to Lowton; opening for freight in 1895, and passengers in 1900. It was absorbed into the Great Central Railway in 1906.
- Llanelly and Mynydd Mawr Railway – was a railway company operating from 1881 to 1923.
- Llanidloes and Newtown Railway – was a railway company operating from 1859 to 1864.
- Llantrisant and Taff Vale Junction Railway – was a railway company operating from 1863 to 1870 when it was leased to the Taff Vale Railway.
- Llanvihangel Railway – was a railway company operating from circa 1811 to 1846.
- LLM Communications – was a political lobbying company. Established in 1997, it is now defunct.
- Loch Lomond Distillery Company – is a producer of Scotch whisky that owns the Loch Lomond distillery located in Alexandria, West Dunbartonshire, Scotland. The distillery was founded in 1964.
- Loch Tay Steamboat Company – was a company that operated steamboat services on Loch Tay, Scotland. It was founded in 1882 and operated until 1921. It was succeeded by the Caledonian Steam Packet Company.
- Lochearnhead, St Fillans and Comrie Railway – was a railway company established in 1897 to make a line along the Strathearn valley, Scotland to connect the Callander and Oban Railway to Crieff. Part of the line opened in 1901. In 1902 it was absorbed into the Caledonian Railway.
- Londis – is a symbol group company with retail units that are mainly convenience stores. 'Londis' is an abbreviation of London District Stores. It was founded in 1959 by Kevin Stanley-Adams. In 2004 it was acquired by Musgrave. In 2015 it was acquired by Booker Group which is now owned by Tesco.
- London and Brighton Railway – was a railway company established in 1837 that made a line from a junction with the London and Croydon Railway at Norwood to the South Coast at Brighton together with a branch to Shoreham-by-Sea. The line opened in 1840 to 1841. In 1846 it was amalgamated with the London and Croydon Railway, the Brighton and Chichester Railway, and the Brighton, Lewes and Hastings Railway to form the London, Brighton and South Coast Railway.
- London and Croydon Railway – was a railway company established in 1835 to make a line from Croydon to London. Among its new stations were London Bridge Station and Bricklayers Arms Station. The line opened in 1839. In 1846 it was amalgamated with the London and Brighton Railway, the Brighton and Chichester Railway, and the Brighton, Lewes and Hastings Railway to form the London, Brighton and South Coast Railway.
- London and North Eastern Railway (LNER) – was a railway company operating from 1923 to 1948. It was one of the Big Four.
- London and North Western Railway – was a railway company operating from 1846 to 1922.
- London Clubs International – is a gaming and hospitality company. Established in 1981, its headquarters is in London. It is owned by Caesars Entertainment.
- London Electric Railway – was a subsidiary of the Underground Electric Railways Company of London (UERL) formed in 1910 to combine the management of the Baker Street and Waterloo Railway, the Charing Cross, Euston and Hampstead Railway and the Great Northern, Piccadilly and Brompton Railway, three deep level underground railway lines. In 1933, with the UERL and other London transport operators it became part of the London Passenger Transport Board.
- London Electricity Board – was a state owned energy company (electricity supply and distribution, electrical appliances retailer) from 1948 to 1998. Headquartered in London, it was also known as LEB, and London Electricity plc. In 1998 it was acquired by Électricité de France.
- London Films – is a film and television production company, established in 1932.
- London Hydraulic Power Company – was an energy company (hydraulic power generation and supply) from 1883 to 1977. It was located in London.
- LondonMetric Property – is a property company based in London. It was founded by Raymond Mould and Patrick Vaughan in 2007 as London & Stamford Property. In 2013 it was merged with Metric Property Investments to form LondonMetric Property. Its acquisitions include LXi REIT and Urban Logistics REIT.
- London, Midland and Scottish Railway (LMS) – was a railway company operating from 1923 to 1948. It was one of the Big Four.
- London Stock Exchange Group – is a stock exchange and financial information company headquartered in the City of London. It owns the London Stock Exchange, Refinitiv, FTSE Russell, and some similar companies. It was founded in 2007. In 2022 its revenue was £7.7 billion, with a net income of -£1.4 billion.
- Lonmin – is a mining company (platinum group metals). Established in 1909 as the London and Rhodesian Mining and Land Company, it was later known as Lonrho when it briefly owned several UK newspapers. Its headquarters is in London.
- Lotus Cars – is a manufacturing company (sports and racing cars, and engineering development). Established in 1948 in Hornsey, London, its headquarters is in Hethel, Norfolk. It was formerly known as Lotus Engineering Limited. It has become Group Lotus PLC divided into Lotus Cars and Lotus Engineering.
- Loughborough Building Society – is a building society offering mortgages, savings, investments, and insurance. It is headquartered in Loughborough, Leicestershire. It was founded in 1867 as the Loughborough Permanent Investment, Land and Building Society.
- Love Productions – is a television production company. Established in 2004, its headquarters is in London. Its owner is Sky Group.
- Lowestoft Water Company – was a utility company (water supply, formerly also a gas supplier) from 1853 to 1962. It was formerly known as the Lowestoft Gas, Water and Market Company. In 1962 it merged with the Great Yarmouth Waterworks Company to form the East Anglian Water Company.
- Lucky Me – is a record label and design studio company. Established in 2007, its headquarters is in Glasgow, Scotland.
- Ludger – is a biotechnology company (glycoprofiling technology). Established in 1999, its headquarters is in Oxford.
- Lush – is a company that produces and sells vegan or vegetarian cosmetic products such as creams, soaps, shampoo, bath bombs, moisturisers, showergels, lotions, scrubs, and masks. It operates a multinational retail store chain, and a retail website. Some of its stores also have spa facilities such as massage and facials. It is headquartered in Poole, Dorset. It was founded in 1995 by Mark Constantine, his wife Mo Constantine, and five other founders. Between 2003 and 2009 it also operated the brand and branded stores named 'B Never' (B Never Too Busy To Be Beautiful).
- Luther Pendragon – is a public relations company. Established in 1992, its headquarters is in London.
- LXi REIT – is a real estate investment trust founded in 2016 that is headquartered in London. In 2024 it was acquired by LondonMetric Property.

== M ==
- M J Gleeson – is a housing company focused on house building in urban regeneration, residential property management, and land trading. Headquartered in Sheffield, South Yorkshire, it was founded in 1903.
- Mace – is a construction and business services company. It is headquartered in London. It was founded in 1990 by a group of construction professionals led by Ian Macpherson. In 2022 its revenue was £1.9 billion, with a net income of £22 million.
- Mackies of Scotland – is a private food manufacturing company specialising in ice cream, and chocolate confectionery. Founded in 1912 as a dairy farm, the milk retail business was divested in 1997. Ice cream production began in 1986, crisps from 2009 to 2022, and chocolate in 2014. It is headquartered in Rothienorman, Scotland. In 2018 its revenue was £13.9 million, with an operating income of £1.3 million.
- Magic Light Pictures – is a film and television production company that also manages the children's brand 'The Gruffalo'. Headquartered in London, it was founded in 2003 by film producers Martin Pope and Michael Rose.
- Magma Pictures – is a film production company headquartered in London. It was founded in 2004 by film directors James Walker and Ed Boase. Its sister company is Young Film Academy which provides film education.
- Magnet Kitchens – is a designer, manufacturer, and retailer of fitted kitchens, kitchen units, and joinery. It also sells kitchen appliances. It operates a retail store chain and retail website using the brands 'Magnet' for retail customers, and 'Magnet Trade' for registered trade customers. It is headquartered in Darlington, County Durham. It was founded in 1918 by Tom Duxbury. In the 1920s Magnet began the first mass-production of joinery, and door and window products, with kitchen products added in 1970. By the 1970s it had a joinery store chain. In 1975 it was merged with timber company Southern-Evans to form Magnet & Southerns. In 1984 it was floated on the London Stock Exchange. In 1985 it began opening kitchen retail showrooms. In 1989 the Southern-Evans business was sold, and then there was a management buyout which failed and left the lenders in control. In 1990 separate retail and trade divisions were introduced. In 1994 it was acquired by Berisford who sold it to Nobia in 2001.
- Maldon Sea Salt – is a salt producing company based in Maldon, Essex. It was founded in 1882 after being part of a nearby coal firm.
- Man Group – is a multinational financial services company providing investment funds for institutional and private investors. It is headquartered in London. It was founded in 1783 by James Man as a sugar broker. It continued to trade in commodities through the 19th and 20th centuries before diversifying into financial services. It was renamed ED&F Man in 1869. In 2000 it was split into Man Group for financial services, and ED&F Man for commodities trading which was taken private in a management buy-out. In 2007 Man Group became an investment management business following the demerger and flotation of its brokerage business, MF Global on the New York Stock Exchange. Since then it has acquired a number of other investment management companies. From 2002 to 2019 it sponsored the Booker Prize. In 2025 it had $227 billion of assets under management.
- Manchester Collieries – was a coal mining company that operated from 1929 to 1947. Headquartered in Walkden, it was formed by the merger of a number of independent mining companies. It was nationalised in 1947.
- Manchester Hydraulic Power – was a hydraulic power generation and supply company ran by Manchester Corporation from 1894 to 1972. It was headquartered in Manchester.
- Manchester, Sheffield and Lincolnshire Railway – was a railway company operating from 1847 to 1897.
- Mancunian Films – was a film production company that operated from 1934 to 1954. It was founded by film producer, director and screenwriter John E. Blakeley in London as Blakeley's Productions until it was renamed The Mancunian Film Distributors, Ltd. In 1947 it relocated to Dickenson Road Studios, Rusholme, Manchester.
- Mansfield Building Society – is a building society offering mortgages, savings, and insurance. Headquartered in Mansfield, Nottinghamshire; it was founded in 1869.
- MANWEB (Merseyside and North Wales Electricity Board) – was a nationalised energy company supplying and distributing electricity. Established in 1947, it was privatised in 1990, when it became MANWEB plc. In 1996 it was purchased by Scottish Power and is now part of SP Energy Networks.
- Marconi Electronic Systems – was a defence systems company (naval vessels, radio, radar, munitions, spacecraft, avionics) from 1897 to 1999. Headquartered in Chelmsford, Essex, it was formerly known as Marconi Company, and GEC-Marconi when the General Electric Company became its parent company in 1968. In 1999 it was merged with British Aerospace to form BAE Systems.
- Marella Cruises – is a transport company (cruise line). Established in 1973, it was formerly known as Thomson Cruises. Its parent company is TUI AG.
- Market Harborough Building Society – is a building society offering mortgages, and savings. Headquartered in Market Harborough, Leicestershire; it was founded in 1870.
- Marks & Spencer – is a British multinational retail company offering clothing, home products, food, and energy. It was established in 1884 in Leeds by Michael Marks and Thomas Spencer. Now headquartered in London, its total revenue for 2020 was £10.1 billion with a net income of £27.4 million.
- Marlin Sportscars – is a manufacturer of sports cars. Established in 1979 in Plymouth, Devon, its headquarters is in Crediton, Devon.
- Marsden Building Society (trading as the Marsden) – is a building society offering mortgages, savings, investments, loans, and insurance. Headquartered in Nelson, Lancashire; it was founded in 1860.
- Marshalls – is a manufacturer of natural stone and concrete hard landscaping products, water management systems, street furniture, and landscape protection products. It also operates its own quarries. It is headquartered in Elland, West Yorkshire. It was founded in 1890 by Solomon Marshall. In 2022 it acquired roof manufacturer Marley. Its revenue in 2022 was £719 million, with a net income of £26 million.
- Martin Walter of Folkestone – was a company that started in 1773 as a harness maker then became a coachbuilder for motor vehicles including dormobiles.
- Marylebone Studios – was a film production company. Established in the late 1930s, its headquarters was in London.
- Marv Films – is a film production company. Established in 2004, its headquarters is in London.
- Matalan – is a company that operates a fashion and homeware retail store chain and retail website. It also produces clothing and other items. It is headquartered in Knowsley, Merseyside. It was founded in 1985 by John Hargreaves. In 1998 it was floated on the London Stock Exchange and then taken private again in 2006 by the Hargreaves family who remain the owners.
- Mathmos – is a manufacturer of lighting products headquartered in Poole, Dorset. It is best known for the lava lamp which was invented by Edward Craven Walker who founded the company in 1963 as Crestworth. Production for the European market took place at Crestworth while the product was licensed for other markets. The company was renamed Mathmos in 1992.
- Mawddwy Railway – was a railway company operating from 1867 to 1922.
- Mayflower Pictures – is a film production company, 1937–1940.
- Mayflower Productions – is a film production company, 1948–1954.
- McCallum Bagpipes – is a manufacturer of great highland bagpipes based in Kilmarnock, Scotland. It was founded in 1998 by Stuart McCallum and Kenny Macleod.
- McCarthy Stone – is a developer and manager of retirement communities. It is headquartered in Bournemouth, Dorset. It was founded in 1977 by John McCarthy and Bill Stone. After several changes of ownership, it was acquired by Lone Star Funds in 2020. Its total revenue in 2019 was £725 million, with a net income of £34 million.
- McColl's – is a company that operates a retail chain of convenience stores and newsagents. It trades under the names 'Morrisons Daily' and 'McColl's' for convenience stores, 'Martin's' for newsagents and pound shops, and 'RS McColl' for some of its Scottish stores. Some stores include in-store post offices. It is headquartered in Brentwood, Essex. It was founded in 1973. In 1998 the Martin's and RS M'Coll's newsagent chain was acquired by TM Retail. In 2006 there was a management buyout followed by TM Retail being renamed 'Martin McColl Ltd'. In 2014 it was floated on the London Stock Exchange as McColl's Retail Group. In 2016 it acquired 298 stores from The Co-operative Group. In 2022 it was put into administration and then acquired by Morrisons.
- McLaren Group – is an automotive manufacturer based at the McLaren Technology Centre in Woking, England. It was founded in 1985 by Ron Dennis.
- McLaughlin & Harvey Holdings – is a construction and civil engineering company. It is headquartered in Mallusk, County Antrim, Northern Ireland. It was founded in 1853 by Henry McLaughlin and William Harvey. Its main subsidiaries are Laughlin & Harvey Ltd in Northern Ireland, and Trench Holdings Ltd in Scotland. In 2007 it acquired Barr Construction.
- McLean Homes – was a house building company headquartered in Wolverhampton, West Midlands. It was founded in 1920 by John McLean. In 1969 it acquired Midland & General Developments. In 1972 it was acquired by Tarmac Group. In 1995 it was acquired by George Wimpey in an asset swap. The use of the brand ended in 1996.
- M&Co. – is a clothing and homeware retail company. Established in 1834 by Len McGeoch as a pawnbrokers in Paisley, Renfrewshire Scotland, it converted to a clothing retailer from 1953. Now headquartered in Inchinnan, Scotland, it has over 300 stores including overseas. In 2019 its revenue was £193 million, with a net income of £0.88 million.
- ME Group International – is a vending machine company operating photo booths, supermarket photo centres, other vending machines, and also self-service outdoor launderettes under its Revolution division. It is headquartered in Epsom, Surrey. It had its origins in the invention of a compact photograph developing process by Gupp Allen and Ignatius Dunlap Parker in California in 1946. They brought the process to the UK as a photo booth business named "Photo-Me" in 1952. It was listed on the London Stock Exchange in 1962. It was renamed ME Group in 2022.
- Mecca Bingo – is a gambling company (bingo clubs, and online gambling). Established in 1961, its headquarters is in Maidenhead. Formerly known as Top Rank, its parent company is The Rank Group.
- Mecca Leisure Group – is a leisure and hospitality company (nightclubs, cafes, casinos, hotels, theme parks). Established in 1933 as Mecca Agency, its headquarters is in London. In 1990 it became part of The Rank Group.
- Melrose Industries – is a manufacturing company that invests in and divests engineering companies. Established in 2003, its headquarters is in London. Its main subsidiaries are Brush Turbogenerators, GKN, and Nortek. In 2020 its revenue was £8.7 billion, with a net income of £533million.
- Melton Building Society – is the trading name of The Melton Building Society.
- Mercantile Investment Trust – is an investment trust focused on UK medium and smaller companies. Headquartered in London; it was founded in 1884. It is managed by JPMorgan Chase.
- Merchant Archive Ltd. – a fashion label and store, established by Sophie Merchant in 2007.
- Merchant Ivory Productions – is a film production company, established in 1961.
- Merchants Trust – is an investment trust focused on Footsie 100 companies. It is headquartered in London. It was founded in 1889 by Robin Benson.
- Merton Park Studios – was a film production and studio company that operated from 1930 to 1967.
- Merlin Cinemas – is a cinema chain company. Established in 1990, its headquarters is in England.
- Metcalfe's Food Company – was a private food company founded in 2010 by Julian Metcalfe. Headquartered in London, it manufactured snack food under the Metcalfes Skinny brand and retailed grocery under the Itsu brand. In 2015 the company was split into Metcalfes Skinny, and Itsu.
- Metcalfes Skinny – is a snack food company that originated in 2009 as part of Metcalfe's Food Company. In 2015 it was split out as a separate company, and in 2016 it was purchased by Snyder's-Lance.
- Metro Bank – is a retail and commercial bank headquartered in London. It was founded in 2010 by Anthony Thomson and Vernon Hill. Its acquisitions include SME Finance, and Retail Money Market.
- Metropolitan Water Board – was a state owned utility company supplying water and dealing with sewage. It operated from 1903 to 1974. Formed from the amalgamation of eight private water companies, it became part of Thames Water.
- Metropolitan Railway – was a railway company established in 1854 to construct an underground railway in London. The company opened the world's first underground railway in 1863 between Farringdon and Paddington and over the next seventy years opened additional lines into Middlesex, Hertfordshire and Buckinghamshire. In 1932, the company was merged with other transport operators into the London Passenger Transport Board.
- M&G – is a financial services investment company headquartered in London. It was founded in 1931 as the Municipal & General Securities Company. In 1999 M&G Investments was acquired by Prudential. It was demerged in 2019. It has 2 subsidiaries: M&G Real Estate, and Infracapital. In 2022 its revenue was £6.5 billion, with a net income loss of £1.6 billion.
- MG Cars – was a manufacturing company (sports and racing cars) from 1930 to 1972. MG Cars were first produced in 1924, at Oxford.
- MG Motor – is a manufacturing company (sports and racing cars). Established in 2006, its headquarters is in Longbridge, Birmingham. Its parent company is SAIC Motor.
- MGM British Studios – is a film production company, 1936–1970. It was a subsidiary of MGM.
- MGM-EMI — is a film production and distribution company. See EMI Films.
- MHP Communications – is a public relations company. Established in 2010, its headquarters is in London.
- Mid-Wales Railway – was a railway company operating from 1864 to 1904.
- Midland Railway – was a railway company operating from 1844 to 1923.
- Miller Homes – is a house building company headquartered in Edinburgh, Scotland. It was founded in 1934 by Sir James Miller. It also became a construction company during WWII and thereafter. In 2005 it acquired Fairclough Homes. In 2014 it sold its construction division to Galliford Try. In 2022 it was acquired by Apollo Global Management.
- Minera Lead Mines – was a lead mining company from 1845 to 1914. It was located in Minera, Wales.
- Minera Limeworks – was a mining company (lime quarries and kilns) from 1852 to 1972. It was located in Minera, Wales.
- Minerals Separation, Limited – is a mining company (ore extraction processes), c1903-c1950s. It was headquartered in London.
- Mirisch Films – was a film and television production company from 1962 to 1982. It was a subsidiary of The Mirisch Company.
- Mitchells & Butlers (M&B) – is a hospitality company that runs over 1700 managed pubs, bars, and restaurants in the UK and Germany. Its brands include: All Bar One, Miller & Carter, Nicholson's, Toby Carvery, Harvester, Browns Restaurants, O'Neills, and the Alex brand in Germany. It is headquartered in Birmingham. It has its roots in the Mitchells & Butlers Brewery which was founded in 1898, and merged into Bass Brewery in 1961. In 2000 Bass rebranded as Six Continents and in 2003 was split into IHG Hotels & Resorts for the hotel's business, and Mitchells & Butlers for the pubs, bars, and restaurants business. In 2022 its revenue was £2.2 billion, with a net income of £13 million.
- Mitie Group – is a strategic outsourcing and energy services company headquartered at The Shard in London. It offers infrastructure consultancy, facilities management, property management, energy services and healthcare services. In June 2026 it employed 84,000 people. It was founded in 1987 by David Telling and Ian Stuart as MESL. In 1988 it was listed on the London Stock Exchange and, in 1989, was merged with Highgate & Job to form the Mitie Group (Mitie is pronounced Mighty). It went on to make many acquisitions and fullfilled a number of large contracts from central government, local government, and private companies.
- Mobico Group (formerly National Express Group) – is a British multinational public transport company. Established in 1972; it is headquartered in Birmingham. It operates coach services in the UK as well as public transport overseas including train services. It operated bus services in the UK but sold the remaining business in August 2026.
- Mo-Car – was an automobile manufacturing company that operated from 1895 to 1905. Headquartered in Glasgow, Scotland, it later became Arrol-Johnston.
- Mofilm – is an advertising company. Established in 2007, its headquarters is in London.
- Molten Ventures – is a venture capital company investing in technology companies. It is headquartered in London. It was founded in 2006 as Esprit Capital, then renamed Draper Esprit in 2015 after joining the Draper Venture Network under Tim Draper. In 2016 it joined the London Stock Exchange by an initial public offering. In 2021 it was renamed Molten Ventures and, in 2023, acquired Forward Partners.
- Mond Nickel Company – was a mining company that operated from 1900 to 1929. It was merged with the International Nickel Company.
- Mondi – is a multinational packaging and paper manufacturer. Founded in 1967 in South Africa, it is now headquartered in Weybridge U.K. and Vienna, Austria. In 2022 its total revenue was €8.9 billion, with a net income of €1.5 billion.
- Monks Investment Trust – is an investment trust headquartered in Edinburgh, Scotland. In 1929 it was founded with 2 other trusts by a group of investors headed by Lord Geddes. The other trusts were The Friars Investment Trust, and The Abbots Investment Trust. In 1931 Baillie Gifford took over the management of the 3 trusts. In 1968 the 3 trusts were merged into Monks Investment Trust which acquired the total share capital.
- Monmouth Railway – also known as Monmouth Tramroad was a horse-drawn plateway operating from 1812 to the late 1870s.
- Monmouthshire Building Society — (Welsh: Cymdeithas Adeiladu'r Sir Fynwy) – is a building society offering mortgages, savings, and insurance. It is headquartered in Newport, Wales. It was founded in 1869 as the Monmouthshire and South Wales Permanent Investment Benefit Building Society. After several preceding name changes, it was renamed the Monmouthshire Building Society in 1969.
- Monmouthshire Railway and Canal Company – was a canal and railway company operating a canal and a network of railways. Previously named the Monmouthshire Canal Navigation it operated from 1796 to 1875.
- MONY Group (trading as MoneySuperMarket) – provides money-saving websites such as the price comparison websites MoneySuperMarket, Travel Supermarket, Ice Lolly, Decision Tech, along with the cash back website Quidco and the Moneysavingexpert advice website. It is headquartered in Ewloe, Wales. It was founded in 1987 by Simon Nixon and Duncan Cameron as a mortgage subscription business before switching to a price comparison business in 1993.
- Monzo (trading as Monzo) – is an online bank offering current accounts, savings accounts, lending products, and virtual credit cards, for personal and commercial customers. Headquartered in London; it was founded in 2015 by Tom Blomfield, Jonas Huckestein, Jason Bates, Paul Rippon and Gary Dolman. In 2023 its revenue was £355 million, with a net income loss of £116 million.
- Moonpig – is an internet-based company offering personalised greetings cards, flowers, and small gifts. It is headquartered in London and Guernsey. It was founded in 2000 by Nick Jenkins. In 2011 it was acquired by Photobox Group. In 2019 Moonpig was moved from Photobox Group to form Moonpig Group which also included Dutch card company Greetz. In 2021 it was floated on the London Stock Exchange. In 2022 its revenue was £304 million, with a net income of £31.4 million.
- Morgan Advanced Materials – is a manufacturer of specialist industrial products using carbon, advanced ceramics, and composites. It is headquartered in Windsor, Berkshire. It was founded in 1856 by the six Morgan brothers (William, Thomas, Walter, Edward, Octavius and Septimus) as the Patent Plumbago Crucible Company that manufactured crucibles. In the 1870s it was renamed Morgan Crucible until 2013 when it became Morgan Advanced Materials. Its subsidiaries are Morgan Technical Ceramics and Thermal Ceramics. In 2022 its revenue was £1.1 billion, with a net income of £96 million.
- Morgan Motor Company – is a manufacturer of luxury cars. Established in 1910, its headquarters is in Malvern, Worcestershire.
- Morgan Sindall – is a construction, civil engineering, and regeneration company that operates in the public, regulated, and private sectors. Headquartered in London, it was founded in 1977. In 2022 its revenue was £3.6 billion, with a net income of £60 million.
- Morrisons – is a supermarket chain. Founded in 1899 by William Morrison, its headquarters is in Bradford. Its 2020 revenue was £17.5 billion, with a net income of £348 million. In October 2021 it was confirmed that the company had been acquired by US private equity company Clayton, Dubilier & Rice.
- Moss Bay Hematite Iron and Steel Company – was a metals and mining company from 1876 to 1909. Headquartered in Workington, Cumberland, in 1909 it was amalgamated into Workington Iron and Steel Company.
- Motorway – operates a used car marketplace. Established in 2017, it uses an online selling platform to allow users to sell their car to dealers. It is based in London and Brighton, East Sussex.
- Mountain Warehouse – is a company that operates a multinational retail store chain and retail website offering outdoor clothing, sportswear, footwear, camping equipment, and accessories. It also produces these categories of products for its own brand. It is headquartered in Victoria, London. It was founded in 1997 by Mark Neale as the retail division of Karrimor International. In 1999 it was acquired by Cullinan Holdings who rebranded the Karrimor stores as 'Mountain Warehouse'. In 2002 it was acquired by NBGI Private Equity. In 2007 it was the subject of a management buyout. Its subsidiaries include Zakti, and Neon Sheep.
- Movie House Cinemas – is a cinema chain company, headquartered in Belfast, Northern Ireland.
- Moving Picture Company – is a film company (visual effects). Established in 1970, its headquarters in London. Its parent company is Vantiva.
- Mr Q Media – was the former name of film company Suited Caribou Media.
- Mr Films – was a film company (studios and film production) that operated from 1973 to 1991. It was headquartered in London.
- Mubi – is a company that operates a global film streaming platform that also includes a film news and criticism webzine called Notebook, and a social networking section. It is also a film producer and distributor. It is headquartered in London. It was founded in 2007 by Efe Cakarel as 'The Auteurs'. In 2010 it was renamed MUBI. In 2022 it acquired the film production company The Match Factory.
- Muir Group – is a house building and timber processing company. It is headquartered in Inverkeithing, Fife, Scotland. It was founded in 1973 by John Muir.
- Murray and Vern – is a British clothing design label. It was founded in 1984 by Anglea Murray and Stuart Vern.
- Murray Income Trust – is an investment trust focused on UK equities. It was established in 1923 as the Caledonian Trust Company, and in 1979 became the Murray Caledonian Investment Trust, before becoming the Murray Investment Trust in 1984. First managed by Murray Johnstone, it is now managed by Abrdn.
- Murray International Trust – is an investment trust focused on worldwide equities. Headquartered in Edinburgh; it is managed by Abrdn.
- musicMagpie – is an online retail company buying and selling secondhand electronics, computer games, games consoles, books, CDs, and DVDs. It is headquartered in Stockport and Macclesfield. It was founded in 2007 by Steve Oliver and Walter Gleeson. In 2024 it was acquired by AO World.
- My Local Bobby – is a security company based in London. It was founded in 2016 by former police officers David McKelvey and Tony Nash. It is owned by TM Eye Ltd.

== N ==
- N. Hingley & Sons – was a mining and manufacturing company involved in cable chains, anchors, coal mining, and iron works. It operated between 1838 and 1986 and was established in Cradley, West Midlands.
- Nantlle Railway – was a railway company operating from 1828 to 1865.
- Napoleon Films – is a film production company. See G.B. Samuelson Productions.
- National Commercial Bank of Scotland – was a financial services company offering banking that operated from 1959 to 1969. It was formed by a merger of the National Bank of Scotland with the Commercial Bank of Scotland. In 1969 it was merged with the Royal Bank of Scotland to form the National and Commercial Banking Group, which was later renamed the Royal Bank of Scotland Group and then NatWest Group.
- National Counties Building Society – is a building society offering mortgages, savings, investments, loans, and insurance. It is headquartered in Epsom, Surrey. It was founded in 1896 as the Fourth Post Office Mutual Society. In 1972 it was renamed the National Counties Building Society. In 2014 it founded the Family Building Society.
- National Express Group – see Mobico Group
- National Express East Anglia (NXEA) – was a train operating company owned by National Express that worked the Greater Anglia franchise from April 2004 to February 2012. First trading as One; it was renamed National Express East Anglia in February 2008. It operated all services from Liverpool Street station including destinations in East London, North London, Essex, Hertfordshire, Cambridgeshire, Suffolk and Norfolk as well as other lines. In February 2012 it was succeeded by Greater Anglia.
- National Grid – is a multinational electricity and gas transmission company. It also produces electricity and gas in the Northeastern United States. Established in 1990, its headquarters is in London. Formerly known as National Grid Transco, its predecessor was the Central Electricity Generating Board. In 2022 its revenue was £18.2 billion, with a net income of £2.3 billion.
- National Interest Picture Productions – was a film production company that operated from 1925 to 1978. It was founded by film director Albert E. Hopkins and cinematographer Reginald Wyer. Headquartered in London; it was formerly known as Publicity Pictures.
- National Power – was an energy company producing gas and electricity that operated from 1990 to 2001. Headquartered in London, it was formerly part of the Central Electricity Generating Board. In 2000, it was demerged into Innogy and International Power.
- National Savings and Investments (NS&I) – is a state-owned savings bank headquartered in London. Its savings and investment products include premium bonds, savings accounts, savings certificates, and bonds. It was established in 1861 as the Post Office Savings Bank (POSB), then renamed the National Savings Bank in 1971 until 2002 when it was renamed National Savings and Investments.
- Nationwide Building Society – is the world's largest building society by membership. It operates a branch network and online services offering mortgages, savings, loans, bank accounts, credit cards, and insurance. Headquartered in Swindon, Wiltshire; it derives from the mergers of 250 building societies. It was founded in 1884 as the Co-operative Permanent Building Society. After leaving the British Co-operative Union in 1970 it was renamed the Nationwide Building Society. In 1987 it merged with the Anglia Building Society to become the Nationwide Anglia Building Society until 1991 when it reverted to Nationwide. In 2007 it merged with the Portman Building Society before acquiring the Cheshire Building Society and Derbyshire Building Society in 2008 and the Dunfermline Building Society in 2009. Its subsidiaries include: Nationwide International, Nationwide Syndications, The Mortgage Works, UCB Home Loans, Derbyshire Home Loans, and E-Mex Home Funding. In 2022 its revenue was £3.86 billion, with a net income of £1.25 billion.
- Natural Nylon – was a film and theatre production company that operated from 1997 to 2003.
- NatWest – is a bank providing financial services such as mortgages, savings, loans, investments, and insurance. Established in 1968, its headquarters is in Bishopsgate, London. It was formed from the merger of National Provincial Bank with Westminster Bank. Its parent company is NatWest Holdings, the "ring-fenced" business of NatWest Group.
- NatWest Holdings – is a retail banking holding company which includes NatWest, Royal Bank of Scotland, Coutts, and Lombard North Central. Established in 2016, its headquarters is in London. Its parent company is the NatWest Group.
- NatWest Group – is a holding company containing NatWest, Royal Bank of Scotland, Ulster Bank, NatWest Markets, Coutts, Lombard North Central), RBS International, Drummonds Bank, and Isle of Man Bank. Established in 1969, its headquarters is in Edinburgh, Scotland. It was formed from the merger of the National Commercial Bank of Scotland with the Royal Bank of Scotland. It was formerly known as National and Commercial Banking Group and later as the Royal Bank of Scotland Group. In 2022, its revenue was £13.1 billion, with a net income of £3.5 billion.
- NatWest Markets – is the investment banking component of the NatWest Group. Established in 2016, its headquarters is in Bishopsgate, London.
- NB Private Equity Partners – is an investment company established in 2009. It is managed by Neuberger Berman.
- NCC Group – is an information assurance company offering software escrow and verification, cybersecurity consulting, and managed services. It is headquartered in Manchester. It was founded in 1999 when the National Computing Centre sold its commercial divisions to its existing management team to form NCC Services which was renamed NCC Group in 2000. A secondary management buyout took place in 2003 and, in 2004 it was listed on the London Stock Exchange. It has made over 20 acquisitions.
- Neal Street Productions – is a film, television and theatre production company. Headquartered in Covent Garden, London; it was founded in 2003 by Sam Mendes, Pippa Harris, and Caro Newling. In 2015 it was acquired by All3Media.
- Nelsons – is an alternative medicines company producing homeopathic medicines, complementary medicines, and natural medicines. Headquartered in Wimbledon, London; it was founded in 1866 by Ernst Louis Armbrecht and Charlotte Nelson. It was formerly known as Ambrecht, Nelson & Co, and as A. Nelson & Co.
- NetResult (trading as NetResult) – is an IT company offering IT support for businesses, consultancy, cybersecurity and other IT services. Headquartered in Mold, Flintshire; it was founded in 1996 by Nick Bell.
- NetResult – was a creator of websites and related digital marketing. Headquartered in Brighton, East Sussex; it operated from 1995 to 1997.
- Network Rail – is a non-departmental public body that owns and manages the infrastructure of most of the British railway system. It was established in 2002.
- Newbury Building Society – is a building society offering mortgages, and savings. Headquartered in Newbury, Berkshire; it was founded in 1856.
- Newcastle Building Society – is a building society offering mortgages, savings, investments, and insurance. It is headquartered in Newcastle upon Tyne, Tyne and Wear. It was formed in 1980 by the merger of the Grainger Permanent Building Society (founded 1861) with the Newcastle Permanent Building Society (founded 1863). It merged with the Universal Building Society in 2006; and with the Manchester Building Society in 2023.
- NewDay – is a financial services company offering credit products such as store cards. Established in 2000, its headquarters is in Kings Cross, London. It was formerly known as SAV Credit.
- New Look (trading as New Look) – is a company that operates a clothing retail store chain, and a retail website. It is headquartered in Weymouth, Dorset and London. It was founded in 1969 by Tom Singh. In 2015 it was acquired by Brait SE (SA).
- New Moon – is a film production company. Headquartered in Soho, London; it was founded in 1996 by Caroline Rowland.
- Newport, Abergavenny and Hereford Railway – was a railway company operating from 1853 to 1860.
- Newport, Godshill and St. Lawrence Railway – was a railway company established in 1885 as the Shanklin and Chale Railway. In 1889 it was renamed the Newport, Godshill and St. Lawrence Railway. It operated from 1897 with the line being run by the Isle of Wight Central Railway who acquired ownership in 1913.
- New River Company – was a utility company supplying water, a landowner and residential developer that operated from 1619 to 1904. It became part of the Metropolitan Water Board in 1904.
- Newton, Chambers & Co. – was a mining and manufacturing company involved in coal and ironstone mining, iron production, industrial construction, disinfectant, production of army vehicles such as the Churchill tank during WWII, construction equipment, wax polishes and wood stains, and oil central heating. It operated between 1789 and 2001.
- Newtown and Machynlleth Railway – was a railway company operating from 1862 to 1864.
- Next – is a British multinational clothing, footwear, and home products retailer. Founded in Leeds in 1864 by Joseph Hepworth as Joseph Hepworth & Sons, it is now headquartered in Enderby, Leicestershire. in 2022 its total revenue was £4.3 billion, with a net income of £677 million.
- Night Slugs – is a record label company. Established in 2010, its headquarters is in London.
- Ninety One – is a global investment company focused on both emerging and developed markets. Headquartered in London and Cape Town, South Africa; it is dual listed on the London Stock Exchange and the Johannesburg Stock Exchange. It was founded in 1991 as Investec Asset Management. It was renamed Ninety One and then spun-off from Investec to be listed on the London Stock Exchange in 2020 via an initial public offering. In June 2026 it had £171 billion of assets under management.
- Nexus Studios – is a film production company. Established in 2000, its headquarters is in London.
- Noble Foods – is a limited company producing poultry products and desserts. It is the United Kingdom's largest egg producer. It was founded in 2006 by the merger of Deans Foods with Stonegate which was later divested. Headquartered in Standlake, Oxfordshire, it owns the dessert manufacturer Gü as a subsidiary.
- Norbrook Group – is a pharmaceuticals company (veterinary medicines). Established in 1969, its headquarters is in Newry, Northern Ireland.
- North Atlantic Smaller Companies Investment Trust – is an investment trust targeting smaller companies in North America. Established in 1973 as the Montagu Boston Investment Trust, it became the Consolidated Venture Trust in 1984, and the North Atlantic Smaller Companies Investment Trust in 1993.
- North British Railway (NBR) – was a Scottish railway company with routes from north England through the Scottish Borders and southern Scotland to Edinburgh and Glasgow and north to Mallaig and Aberdeen. It was headquartered in Edinburgh. Founded in 1844, throughout its history it was expanded and acquired many other rail companies. It manufactured locomotives, coaches, and wagons at Cowlairs Works, Glasgow. It also owned docks, Clyde steamers, hotels, road haulage, and part-owned the Forth Bridge. In 1923 it was amalgamated with a number of other railway companies to form the London & North Eastern Railway (LNER).
- North Eastern Gas Board – was a state owned gas supplier that operated from 1949 to 1973. It became part of British Gas.
- North Eastern Railway (NER) – was a railway company that had routes through Yorkshire, County Durham, Northumberland, Westmorland, and Cumberland in England as well as Roxburghshire in Scotland. It was headquartered in York. It was founded in 1854 by the amalgamation of a number of existing railway companies. It continued its acquisitions throughout its history, including the Stockton & Darlington Railway in 1863. Its largest stations included York, Newcastle, and Leeds. Railway coaches were built at its York Carriage Works. It also owned docks and ships, and part-owned the Forth Bridge. In 1923 it was amalgamated with a number of other railway companies to form the London & North Eastern Railway.
- North of Scotland Hydro-Electric Board – was an electricity generator and supplier that operated from 1943 to 1990. Headquartered in Edinburgh, Scotland, it was succeeded by Scottish Hydro Electric.
- North Staffordshire Railway – was a railway company operating from 1845 to 1923.
- North Thames Gas Board – was a state owned gas supplier that operated from 1949 to 1972. It became part of the British Gas Corporation.
- North Western Gas Board – was a state owned gas supplier that operated from 1949 to 1973. In 1973 it became part of British Gas.
- Northern Coachbuilders (NCB) – was a manufacturing company (automobiles). See Smith Electric Vehicles.
- Northern Electric – was an energy company involved in electricity supply and distribution. It operated from 1947 to 1996. Headquartered in Newcastle upon Tyne, it was formerly the North Eastern Electricity Board. In 1996 it was acquired by CalEnergy.
- Northern Gas Networks – is an energy company involved in gas supply and distribution. Established in 2005, its headquarters is in Leeds, Yorkshire.
- Northern Ireland Electricity – is an energy company involved in electricity transmission and distribution. Established in 1973, it was formerly the Northern Ireland Electricity Service. Its parent company is ESB Group.
- Northern Ireland Water – is a state owned water supply and sewage company. Established in 2007, it was formerly the Northern Ireland Water Service.
- Northern Powergrid – is an energy company involved in electricity distribution. Established in 1996, its headquarters is in Newcastle upon Tyne. It was formerly CE Electric UK Funding Company. Its parent company is Berkshire Hathaway Energy.
- Northumbrian Water – is a water supply and sewage company. Established in 1989, its headquarters is in Durham. It was preceded by the Northumbrian Water Authority. Its parent company is Northumbrian Water Group.
- Northumbrian Water Group – is a holding company for several water utility companies including Northumbrian Water and Essex and Suffolk Water. Established in 1989, its headquarters is in Durham. In 2011 it was acquired by CK Infrastructure Holdings.
- NORWEB – was an energy company involved in electricity supply and distribution. It operated from 1948 to 1995. It was formerly the North Western Electricity Board. In 1995 it was acquired by North West Water and became part of North West Electricity Networks.
- Nottingham Building Society (trading as The Nottingham) – is a building society offering mortgages, savings, bankings, investments, and insurance. Headquartered in Nottingham, Nottinghamshire; it was founded in 1849 as the Nottingham Permanent Benefit Building Society. In 1970 it acquired the Grantham Building Society.
- Nottingham Corporation Gas Department – was a state owned power company involved in the production and supply of coal gas. It operated from 1874 to 1947. Headquartered in Nottingham, it was preceded by Nottingham Gas Light and Coke Company. In 1947 it became part of the East Midlands Gas Board.
- Npower – is an energy company involved in electricity generation and supply. Established in 2000, its headquarters is in Swindon, Wiltshire. It was formerly known as Innogy plc, and RWE npower. Its parent company is Innogy.
- Nuclear Electric – was an energy company involved in nuclear power generation. It operated from 1990 to 1995. Headquartered in London, it was formerly part of the Central Electricity Generating Board. In 1995 it became part of British Energy.
- Numatic International – is a manufacturer of domestic, commercial, and industrial cleaning and maintenance equipment. Its main product is the Henry vacuum cleaner. It is headquartered in Chard, Somerset. It was founded in 1969 by Chris Duncan. It has 8 subsidiary companies located in France, South Africa, Germany, The Netherlands, Switzerland, Portugal, Spain, and Italy.
- Number 9 Films – is a film production company. Established in 2002, its headquarters is in London.

== O ==
- Oakhurst Productions – was a film production company, that operated from the late 1960s to 1970.
- Ocado – is an internet grocery retail company that also licenses grocery technology. It is headquartered in Hatfield, Hertfordshire. It was founded in 2000 by Jonathan Faiman, Jason Gissing, and Tim Steiner. In 2022 its revenue was £2.5 billion, with a net income loss of £481 million.
- Octopus Group – trading as Octopus Group is a holding company that includes energy company Octopus Energy, financial advice company Octopus Money, investment company Octopus Investments, venture capital fund Octopus Ventures, and property company Octopus Real Estate. Founded in 2000; it is headquartered in London.
- Octopus Energy – is an international energy company generating and supplying electricity, including sustainable energy. It is headquartered in London. It was founded in 2015 as a subsidiary of Octopus Group. In 2021 it acquired sister company Octopus Renewables that invests in sustainable energy generation. It also supplies software to other energy companies.
- Odeon Cinemas – is a cinema chain company. Established in 1928, its headquarters is in Brierley Hill, Staffordshire.
- Ogle Design – is a design consultancy company that was formerly an automobile manufacturer. Established in 1954, its headquarters is in Letchworth, Hertfordshire.
- One Horizon Group – is a technology and media acquisition company, headquartered in London.
- OnePoll – is a research company. Established in 2002, its headquarters is in London.
- OneSavings Bank (trading as Kent Reliance) – is a bank offering mortgages, loans, and savings. Headquartered in Chatham, Kent; it was founded in 1898 as the Chatham & District Reliance Building Society. In 1986 it was merged with the Herne Bay Building Society and renamed as 'Kent Reliant Building Society'. In 2010 J.C. Flowers & Co. acquired a stake in the company to form OneSavings plc which was renamed 'OneSavings Bank plc' in 2011. In 2014 it was floated on the London Stock Exchange. In 2019 it was merged with Charter Court Financial Services. In 2022 its revenue was £775 million, with a net income of £410 million. It is owned by OSB Group plc.
- OpenBet – is a gambling software company. Established in 1996, its headquarters is in Chiswick, London. It is owned by Scientific Games Corporation.
- Optilan – is a communications and security company. Established in 1990, its headquarters is in Coventry.
- Optical Express (listed as DCM (Optical Holdings) Ltd; trading as Optical Express) – is a company that provides ophthalmology services such as laser eye surgery, cataract surgery, and lens replacement surgery. It is also a dispensing optician and operates a retail chain of clinics. Previously it operated a chain of dentists clinics, cosmetic clinics, and a private hospital. It is headquartered in Glasgow, Scotland. It was founded in 1991 by David Moulsdale. Its acquisitions include: Remocker Shapiro, Specialeyes plc, Co-op Eyecare, Specdeals, and The Health Clinic.
- Opus Energy – is an energy company which supplies gas and electricity. Established in 2002, its headquarters is in Northampton. Formerly known as Oxford Power Holdings, since 2017 it is part of the Drax Group.
- Oswestry and Newtown Railway – was a railway company operating from 1860 to 1863.
- Oswestry, Ellesmere and Whitchurch Railway – was a railway company operating from 1863 to 1864.
- OVO Energy – is an energy company involved in electricity and gas supply and home telecommunications. Established in 2009, its headquarters is in Bristol.
- Oxford BioMedica – is a pharmaceuticals company involved in gene-based medicines. Established in 1995, its headquarters is in Oxford.
- Oxford Instruments – is a designer and manufacturer of tools and systems for industry and research. Its inventions have included superconducting magnets, MRI whole body scanners, and active shielding for pacemakers. It is headquartered in Abingdon, Oxfordshire. It was founded in 1959 by Sir Martin Wood as the first substantial commercial spin-out company from the University of Oxford. In 2022 its revenue was £367 million, with a net income of £38 million.
- Oxford Nanopore Technologies – is a company that develops and sells nanopore sequencing products for the direct, electronic analysis of DNA, RNA, proteins, and small molecules. Headquartered at Oxford Science Park; it was founded in 2005 by Hagan Bayley, Gordon Sanghera, and Spike Willcocks as a spin-out from the University of Oxford. It was listed on the London Stock Exchange in 2021 via an initial public offering.
- Oxford Scientific Films – is a television and film production company. Established in 1968, its headquarters is in Oxford.
- Oxitec – is a biotechnology company involved in genetically modified insect production for insect/disease control. Established in 2002, its headquarters is in Oxford.

== P ==
- Pacific Horizon Investment Trust – is an investment trust focused on the Asia Pacific region (excluding Japan) and the Indian Sub-continent. It is headquartered in Edinburgh, Scotland. It was founded in 1989 as Dealchief plc before being given its present name in July of that year. Formerly managed by Tyndall International (Asia) Ltd, it is now managed by Baillie Gifford.
- PageGroup – is an international recruitment company headquartered in Weybridge, Surrey. It was founded in 1976 by Michael Page and Bill McGregor. In 1983 it was listed on the Unlisted Securities Market as Michael Page International. In 1988 it was floated on the London Stock Exchange. It was acquired by Spherion Corporation in 1997, and then, in 2001, it was demerged. In 2012 it was renamed as PageGroup. Its brands are Michael Page, Page Executive, Page Personnel, and Page Outsourcing. In 2022 its revenue was £1.9 billion, with a net income of £139 million.
- Pan African Resources – is a gold mining company headquartered in Johannesburg, South Africa, registered in London, UK, and dual-listed on the London Stock Exchange and the Johannesburg Stock Exchange. It was founded in 2000. It owns gold mines in South Africa and gold and copper mines in Australia.
- Panorama Antennas – is a manufacturing company involved in communications antennas and closely related diplexer products. Established in 1947, its headquarters is in London. It was formerly known as J.F.J. Products.
- Pantheon Infrastructure – is an investment trust company focused on infrastructure assets in North America and Europe. Headquartered in London; it was founded in 2021. It is managed by Pantheon Ventures.
- Pantheon International – is a private equity fund of funds investment trust headquartered in Exeter, Devon. It was founded in 1987, and is managed by Pantheon Ventures.
- Pantheon Ventures – is an investment company focused on private equity, infrastructure, real assets, and debt. Headquartered in London; it was founded in 1981 as the private equity investment division of GT Management. In 1998 Pantheon was the subject of a management buyout. Then in 2004 it was acquired by Russell Investments who sold it to Affiliated Managers Group in 2010.
- Paragon Banking Group – is a financial services company offering mortgages, savings accounts, and business finance. It is headquartered in Solihull, West Midlands. It was founded in 1985 as the National Home Loans Corporation. In 1997 it was renamed the Paragon Group of Companies. In 2003 it acquired Brittanic Money. It launched the internet bank Paragon Bank in 2014. In 2017 it was renamed Paragon Banking Group plc. It acquired Titlestone Property Finance in 2018. In 2022 its revenue was £393 million, with a net income of £313 million.
- Parcelforce – is a courier and logistics services company. Headquartered in Milton Keynes, Buckinghamshire; its parent company is Royal Mail. Its roots are in the Parcel Post service of Royal Mail which began in 1883. In 1990 Royal Mail Parcels was rebranded as Parcelforce, and in 1992 it was privatised.
- Partners Group Private Equity – is an investment trust company focused on private equity direct investments. Headquartered in Saint Peter Port, Guernsey; it was founded in 2007 as Princess Private Equity. It adopted its current name in 2024. It is managed by Partners Group.
- Partridge Films (aka Partridge Productions) – is a television and film production company. Established in 1974, its headquarters is in Bristol.
- Passion Pictures – is a film production company. Established in 1987, its headquarters is in London.
- Pathway Intermediates – is a producer of specialty chemicals. Founded in Shrewsbury in 2001, since 2018 it is owned by Easy Bio from South Korea.
- Patria Private Equity Trust – is an investment trust company with a European focus. Headquartered in London; it was established in 2001 as Standard Life European Private Equity Trust under the management of Standard Life. It was renamed Standard Life Private Equity Trust in 2017; then renamed abrdn Private Equity Opportunity Trust in 2022 under the management of abrdn. In 2024 it was acquired by Patria Investments Limited and renamed Patria Private Equity Trust.
- PD Ports – is a ports, shipping, and logistics company that was formerly involved in coal mining and engineering. It is the owner of Teesport, and ports at Hartlepool, Howden and Keadby; with additional operations at the Port of Felixstowe, Port of Immingham, and Port of Hull. Established in 1840, its headquarters is in Middlesbrough. It was formerly known as Powell Duffryn. Since 2009 it is owned by Brookfield Asset Management.
- Pearson – is a British multinational publishing and education company headquartered in London. It owns Edexcel which is one of the examining boards for the UK. It also owns Pearson Vue which is an electronic education testing company. It produces textbooks and digital technology for teachers and children. Samuel Pearson founded the company in 1840 as a Yorkshire-based construction business named S Pearson & Sons. The construction business ended in the 1920s with a move into publishing. Since then it has had interests in newspaper and book publishing, television broadcasting, software publishing, and data management, before concentrating on education services. In 2022 its revenue was £3.8 billion, with a net income of £244 million.
- Pennon Group – is a utility company involved in water supply, sewage, and waste management. Established in 1989, its headquarters is in Exeter, Devon. Its subsidiaries include South West Water and Viridor. In 2019 its revenue was £1.4 billion, with net income of £222 million.
- Penrith Building Society – is a building society offering mortgages, savings, and insurance. Based in Penrith, Cumbria; it was founded in 1877.
- Percy Main Productions – is the former name of Scott Free Productions a film and television production company.
- Permira Holdings – is a private equity investment firm specialising in buyouts, growth equity and credit funds. It is structured as a partnership and is owned by most of its senior management. Headquartered in Schomberg House, London; it was founded in 1985 as Schroder Ventures. In 1996 Schroder Ventures staff formed an independent company named Schroder Ventures Europe which was renamed Permira in 2001. In 2024 it had €80 billion of assets under management.
- Pershing Square Holdings – is a British investment trust that makes long-term investments in North American companies, tracking the performance of Pershing Square Capital Management. Founded in 2012, it is headquartered in Saint Peter Port, Guernsey.
- Persimmon – is a housebuilding company headquartered in York, North Yorkshire. It was founded in 1972 by Duncan Davidson. Its acquisitions include Ideal Homes, the Scottish housing business of John Laing Group, Tilbury Douglas, Beazer, Charles Church, and Westbury. Its brands include Persimmons Homes, Charles Church, and Westbury Partnerships. In 2022 its revenue was £3.8 billion, with a net income of £561 million.
- Personal Assets Trust – is an investment trust headquartered in Edinburgh, Scotland. It was founded in 1983.
- Pets at Home – is a pet supplies retailer selling small pets, and pet products such as food, toys, bedding, medication, and accessories. It also provides grooming, veterinary care, and dog training services. It is headquartered in Handforth, Cheshire. It was founded in 1991 by Anthony Preston. In 1999 it acquired Petsmart UK. In 2010 Pets at Home was acquired by Bridgepoint Capital who in 2010 sold it to KKR. In 2014 it was floated on the London Stock Exchange. It owns Vets for Pets. In 2022 its revenue was £1.3 billion, with a net income of £124 million.
- Pfizer UK – is a pharmaceuticals company. Established in 1952, its headquarters is in Tadworth, Surrey. It is a subsidiary of Pfizer.
- Phoenix Group – is the former name of insurance company Standard Life.
- Phoenix Natural Gas – is an energy company involved in gas supply. Established in 1996, its headquarters is in Belfast, Northern Ireland. It was formerly part of British Gas.
- Phones 4u – was a mobile phone retailer that operated from 1987 to 2014. Headquartered in Newcastle-under-Lyme, Staffordshire, it was formerly known as Midlands Mobile Sales.
- Photoplay Productions – is a film company involved in production, and restoration. It was established in 1990.
- Picturehouse Cinemas – is a cinema chain, and film distribution company. Established in 1989, its headquarters is in London.
- Pinball London – is a film production company. Established in 2009, its headquarters is in London.
- Pinewood Group – is a film and television studios company. Established in 2001, its headquarters is in Iver Heath, Buckinghamshire.
- Pinewood Studios – is a film and television studios. Established in 1936, it is located at Iver Heath, Buckinghamshire.
- PizzaExpress – is a company that operates a multinational pizza restaurant chain. It is headquartered in Uxbridge, London. It was founded in 1965 by Peter Boizot. In 1993 it was acquired by Hugh Osmond and Luke Johnson who floated it on the London Stock Exchange that year. In 2003 it was acquired by TDR Capital and Capricorn Associates who took it private again. In 2005 it was floated on the LSE again as part of Gondola Holdings. In 2007 it was acquired by Cinven; by Hony Capital in 2015; and then by its bond holders in 2020. It is now a private company limited by shares. It also operates under the brands Milano, Marzano, and Za.
- Pladis Global (trading as Pladis) – is a confectionery and snack foods company headquartered in London. It owns United Biscuits, Ülker, Godiva Chocolatier and DeMet's Candy Company. It was founded in 2016 as a subsidiary of Yildiz Holding.
- Plamil Foods – is a manufacturer of vegan food and drink products. It is headquartered in Folkestone, Kent. It was founded in 1956 by Leslie Cross, the then vice-president of The Vegan Society, as the Plantmilk Society. In 1965 it was incorporated as Plantmilk Ltd, and in 1972 renamed Plamil Foods.
- Platform Home Loans – is a financial services company providing mortgages. Established in 1989 as part of Bear Stearns Home Loans, in 2009 it became part of The Co-operative Group.
- Platform Post-production – is a film and television post production company. Established in 2001, its headquarters is in London.
- Playtech – is a gambling software development company providing software for online casinos, online poker rooms, online bingo games, online sports betting, scratch games, mobile gaming, live dealer games, and fixed odds online arcade games. Headquartered in Douglas, Isle of Man; it was founded in 1999 by Teddy Sagi. Its acquisitions include: PT Turnkey Services, PokerStrategy.com, Aristocrat Lotteries, Quickspin, Best Gaming Technology, CFH Group, BetBuddy, and Snaitech. Since 2006 it has been listed on the London Stock Exchange.
- Plus 500 – is a financial betting company that provides online trading services in contracts for difference, share dealing, futures trading, prediction markets, and options on futures. Headquartered in London; it was founded in 2008. Since 2013 it has been listed on the London Stock Exchange. Its acquisitions include E2 Invest Securities, and Mehta Equities.
- Pockit – is a financial services company offering pre-paid spending cards, current accounts, and other finance products. Headquartered in London; it was founded in 2014 by Virraj Jatania.
- Poison Pen Films – is a film production company, headquartered in Leeds.
- Polar Capital Global Financials Trust – is an investment trust company focused on the financial services sector. Headquartered in London; it was established in 2013. It is managed by Polar Capital.
- Polar Capital Global Healthcare Trust – is an investment trust company focused on the health sector. Headquartered in London; it was established in 2010 as Polar Capital Global Healthcare Growth and Income Trust before adopting its current name in 2017. It is managed by Polar Capital.
- Polar Capital Technology Trust – is an investment trust company focused on the technology sector including artificial intelligence. Headquartered in London; it was established in 1996 by Henderson Global Investors as the Henderson Technology Trust. The current name was adopted when management was transferred to Polar Capital in 2001.
- Pollen Street Group – is an investment company focused on alternative investments in the financial and business services sectors. It is headquartered in London. It was founded in 2013 as Pollen Street Capital Holdings by Lindsey McMurray and her team as an investment company spin-out from Royal Bank of Scotland. In 2022 it was acquired by the listed Honeycomb Investment Trust which it had been managing. Thereby it gained a listing on the London Stock Exchange with Honeycomb Investment Trust renamed Pollen Street that same year. In 2024 it changed its listing from an investment trust to a commercial business and was renamed Pollen Street Group.
- PolyGram Filmed Entertainment – was a film production company from 1980 to 2000. It was formerly known as PolyGram Films, PolyGram Pictures, and as PFE.
- Porcelain Film – is a film and television production company. Established in 2004, its headquarters is in London.
- Porterbrook – is a railway company involved in the leasing of rolling stock and associated equipment. Established in 1994, it was formed as part of the privatisation of British Rail.
- Portland Communications – is a communications company involved in political consultancy, and public relations. Established in 2001, its headquarters is in London.
- Portobello Post – is a film company involved in video and film post production. It is headquartered in London.
- Portsmouth Water – is a water supply company. Established in 1857, its headquarters is in Portsmouth, Hampshire.
- Port Talbot Railway and Docks Company – was a docks and railway company operating from 1894 to 1922.
- Post Office Limited – is a state-owned retail post office company established in 1987 as Post Office Counters and is headquartered in London. It offers postage stamps, the handling of letters and parcels for Royal Mail, Parcel Force and other companies, banking, insurance, bureau de change, identity verification, stationery and other products and services. Its network of branches are run by franchise partners or independent business people known as subpostmasters. Since 2015 it has been at the centre of the Horizon scandal.
- Potato – was a television production company that was a subsidiary of ITV Studios. Founded in 2013; its programmes include The Chase, Ninja Warrior UK, CelebAbility, and The Finish Line. In 2025, ITV folded Potato and 12 Yard into a new division of ITV Studios named Bright Entertainment.
- Poundland – is a company that operates a discount general merchandise store chain. It is headquartered in Willenhall, West Midlands. It was founded in 1990 by Dave Dodd and father and son Keith and Steven Smith. In 2002 it was acquired by Advent International; in 2010 by Warburg Pincus; then in 2016 by Steinhoff International. Its acquisitions include 99p Stores, and Frozen Value Ltd (which had operated as Fulton's Foods). Its subsidiary is Dealz.
- Poundstretcher – is a company that operates a discount general merchandise store chain. It is headquartered in Kirby Muxloe, Leicestershire. It was founded in 1981 by Paul Appell and Stephen Fearnley. In 1989 it became a subsidiary of Brown & Jackson plc. In 2003 a rebranding of the stores to '... instore' was begun. This was halted in 2009 when the company was acquired by Crown Crest Group which is owned by brothers Rashid and Aziz Tayub. Its subsidiaries are Bargain Buys and Poundstretcher Extra.
- Poundworld – was a company that operated a discount general merchandise store chain. It was headquartered in Normanton, West Yorkshire. It was founded in 1974 by father and son Chris Edwards Sr and Chris Edwards Jr. Formerly named 'Bargain Centre', and then 'Everything £1', it was renamed 'Poundworld' in 2003. In 2013 it introduced the store chain Bargain Buys which was originally named 'Discount UK'. In 2015 a majority stake in Poundland was acquired by TPG Capital. In 2018 it became defunct.
- Powell & Pressburger – was a film production company from 1939 to 1957. It was also known as The Archers, and as Archers Film Productions.
- Powell Duffryn – is the former name of PD Ports, a sea ports company.
- Premier – is a symbol group company with retail outlets that are mainly convenience stores. As well as branded products it offers own-brand ranges such as Euro Shopper and Happy Shopper. Some stores have in-store post offices. It is headquartered in Wellingborough, Northamptonshire. It was founded in 1994. Its parent company is Booker Group which is owned by Tesco.
- Premier Foods – is a food manufacturing public company that owns brands such as Mr Kipling, Ambrosia, Bird's Custard, Angel Delight, Oxo, Bisto, Batchelors and also produces Cadbury cakes under license. It was founded in 1975 as Hillsdown Holdings by Harry Solomon and David Thompson. First located in London, it is now headquartered in St. Albans, Hertfordshire. In 2020 its revenue was £847 million, with a net income of £46.5 million.
- Premier Inn – is a hospitality company operating a hotel chain. Established in 1987, its headquarters is in Dunstable, Bedfordshire. It was formerly known as Travel Inn. Its parent company is Whitbread.
- Primary Health Properties – is a real estate investment company that owns and operates more than 1,000 primary healthcare facilities in the UK and Ireland. Headquartered in London; it was founded in 1995 by Harry Hyman. In 2019 it merged with Medicx Fund and, in 2025, acquired Assura plc.
- Primerdesign – is a biotechnology company offering products for quantitative real-time polymerase chain reaction). Established in 2005, its headquarters is in Southampton.
- Princes Group – is an international food and drink group involved in the manufacture, import and distribution of branded and customer own-branded products including: fish, meat, fruit, vegetables, soups, pastes, pasta, cooking sauces, edible oils, and soft drinks. It is headquartered at the Royal Liver Building, Liverpool. It was founded in 1880 as a partnership between William Muirhead Simpson and Frank Roberts as Simpson Roberts which imported tinned lobster from Canada. It created brands including: Maypole (1891), Mikado (1895) and Princes (1900). By 1915 it was the world's largest exporter of lobster. In 1919 the partnership was made a company. In 1962 it was renamed Princes Foods. It was acquired by J Bibby & Sons in 1964, then sold to Buitoni Group in 1973 and then to Mitsubishi Corporation in 1989. In 2011 it acquired the Crosse & Blackwell and Farrows brands. By 2013 it was the UK's largest supplier of tinned food. In 2024 Mitsubishi sold Princes to Italian-based Newlat Food which, in 2025, was renamed NewPrinces with Princes Group as its subsidiary. It was listed on the London Stock Exchange in 2025.
- Principality Building Society (Welsh: Cymdeithas Adeiladu'r Principality) – is the largest building society in Wales by assets. Offering mortgages, savings, investments, and insurance; it is headquartered in Cardiff, Wales. It was founded in 1860 as the Principality Permanent Benefit Building Society, and incorporated in 1876 as the Principality Permanent Building Society. In 1913 it was renamed the Principality Building Society. It has been merged with Bridgend Building Society in 1959; Urban Building Society in 1962; Maesteg Permanent Benefit Society in 1968, Aberavon Mutual Permanent Building Society, and Swansea & Carmarthen Building Society in 1974; Llanelli Permanent Building Society in 1977; District Building Society in 1978; Gorseinon Building Society in 1979; and Chatham Building Society in 1985. Its subsidiaries include Nemo Personal Finance Ltd.
- Prism Rail – was a passenger rail company founded in 1995 to bid for rail franchises during the privatisation of British Rail. It won four franchises to operate the following companies: LTS Rail working the London, Tilbury and Southend franchise, Valley Lines (Cardiff Rail Company) working the Valley Lines franchise, Wales & West working the South Wales and West franchise, and the West Anglia Great Northern (WAGN) working the same named franchise. In 1996, it was listed on the London Stock Exchange's Alternative Investment Market. In July 2000, Prism Rail was acquired by National Express. LTS Rail was rebranded as c2c. In 2001 National Express merged the management and support functions of c2c, Silverlink, WAGN, and Stansted Express into one organisation named London Lines. The Welsh franchises Valley Lines, and South Wales and West were restructured as the Wales and Borders franchise (awarded to Arriva UK Trains) and the Wessex franchise (awarded to National Express).
- Progressive Building Society – is a building society offering mortgages, savings, and investments. Headquartered in Belfast, Northern Ireland; it was founded in 1914. It was merged with the City of Derry Building Society in 2014.
- Provident Financial is the former name of Vanquis Banking Group.
- Prudential – is a multinational financial services company offering life assurance, pensions and investment products. Established in 1848, its headquarters is in London. It owns Prudential Corporation Asia, and Jackson National Life. In 2019, its revenue was £93.7 billion, with total income of £792 million.
- Publicity Pictures – was a film production company from 1925 to 1945. It was headquartered in London.
- PureGym – is a company that operates a multinational health club chain. It is headquartered in Leeds, West Yorkshire. It was founded in 2009 by Peter Roberts. It was owned by CCMP Capital and other investors until it was acquired by Leonard Green & Partners in 2017. Its acquisitions include: the UK operations of LA Fitness, Fitness World, and basefit.ch.
- PwC – is a multinational professional services network that is the second largest in the world. It is headquartered in London. It was founded in 1998, when Coopers & Lybrand merged with Price Waterhouse.

== Q ==
- QA – is a digital education and skills provider offering virtual and classroom training, higher education, apprenticeships and talent solutions. Established in 1983, its headquarters is in London.
- Qinetiq – is a multinational defence technology company operating in the defence, security, and critical national infrastructure sectors as well as the commercial sector. It is headquartered in Farnborough, Hampshire. Founded in 2001; its assets were previously part of the Defence Evaluation and Research Agency. It was privatised and floated on the London Stock Exchange in 2006. It has made a number of acquisitions in the UK, US, and continental Europe. The QinetiQ Group is composed of QinetiQ EMEA (Europe, Middle East, and Australasia), and QinetiQ North America. In 2022 its revenue was £1.3 billion, with a net income of £90 million.
- Quantum Pharmaceutical – is a pharmaceuticals company producing and supplying unlicensed medicines, and special obtain products). Established in 2004, its headquarters is in Burnopfield, County Durham. In 2021 it was acquired by Target Healthcare with support from N4 Advisory.
- Quantum Sports Cars – is a manufacturer of sports cars. Established in 1967, its headquarters is in Devon.
- Quick Off The Mark Productions – was a film and television production company that operated from 2009 to 2016. It was headquartered in Glasgow, Scotland.
- Quilter – is a wealth management company headquartered in London. Its platforms include: Quilter Investment Platform, Quilter Investors, Quilter Financial Planning, Quilter Cheviot, and Quilter Invest. It was founded in 2018 from Old Mutual Wealth Management which had been a division of Old Mutual. In 2025 it had £141 billion of assets under management.
- Quiz Clothing (trading as Quiz; part of Tarak International Ltd) – is a company that operates a clothing retail store chain, and retail website. It was founded in 1993 and is headquartered in Glasgow, Scotland.
- Qwerty Films – is a film production company that was established in 1999.

== R ==
- R. Durtnell & Sons – was a house building, restoration, and renovation company. It was headquartered in Brasted, Kent. It was founded in 1591 as a Durtnell family business and remained so until it became defunct in 2019.
- Radical Sportscars – is a racing car manufacturer. Established in 1997, its headquarters is in Peterborough.
- Railtrack – was a group of companies owning, maintaining and managing the rail infrastructure and most of the railway stations of the British railway system from 1994 to 2002.
- Randox Laboratories – is a biotechnology company providing in-vitro diagnostic reagents, and equipment for laboratory medicine. Established in 1982, its headquarters is in Crumlin, County Antrim, Northern Ireland.
- Raspberry Pi Holdings – is a technology company that designs and markets single-board computers, semiconductors, and related accessories under the Raspberry Pi brand. It also has a publishing division named Raspberry Pi Press. It is headquartered in Cambridge. It was founded in 2012 by the Raspberry Pi Foundation as Raspberry Pi Trading Ltd to support commercialisation of the Raspberry Pi Computer which had been developed by the foundation to promote computer science education. Profits were used to support the foundation's charitable activities. In 2021 it was renamed Raspberry Pi Ltd and, in early 2024, was transferred to a new parent company named Raspberry Pi Holdings which, in June 2024, was listed on the London Stock Exchange via an initial public offering. The foundation is the main owner with 46% of shares. Up to March 2025 it has sold 68 million single-board computers.
- Rathbones Group – is a financial services company offering investment management, wealth management, tax planning, pension advice, and banking services. It is headquartered in London. It was founded in 1742 by William Rathbone II as a Liverpool-based timber trading business. In the 19th century it traded in cotton, and in 1841 became the Liverpool agent of the East India Company. In 1912 it stopped its trading operations and moved into financial services. In 1988 it was merged with Comprehensive Financial Services Ltd to form Rathbone Brothers before its name was changed to Rathbone Group in 2021. In 2022 its revenue was £435 million, with a net income of £49 million.
- Reckitt – is a multinational consumer goods company. Established in 1999 by the merger of British company Reckitt & Colman plc and Dutch company Benckiser N.V, its headquarters is in Slough, England.
- Recorded Picture Company — is a film production company. Established in 1974, its headquarters is in London.
- Red Bee Media – is an international broadcasting and media services company. It transmits over 500 television streams on analogue, digital terrestrial, digital satellite, cable, web, and mobile platforms worldwide. Its UK customers include: the BBC, ITV, Channel Four, and UKTV. It also operates video on demand services, media management, content discovery and electronic programme guide services, creation of advertisements and trailers, access services such as subtitling, signing, and audio description, encoding and editing video, interactive television, and webmaster services. Registered and headquartered in London; it originated from BBC Broadcast Ltd which, in 2005, was acquired by Creative Broadcast Services (owned by Macquarie Capital Alliance Group and Macquarie Bank). It was renamed Red Bee Media, and in 2011 it acquired TV Genius. In 2014 it was acquired by Ericsson who renamed it Ericsson Broadcast and Media Services (EBMS). In 2017 its name was reverted to Red Bee Media and it was made an independent subsidiary of Ericsson.
- Redbus Film Distribution – was a film production and distribution company. See Lionsgate UK.
- Redde Northgate – is a former name of Zigup.
- Redrow – is a house building company with 14 operational divisions across the UK. It is headquartered in Ewloe, Flintshire, Wales. It was founded in 1974 by Steve Morgan. Its acquisitions include: Whelmar Lancashire, Costain Homes, and Radleigh Homes. In 2022 its revenue was £2.1 billion, with a net income of £328 million.
- Reeltime Pictures – is a film and television production company, established in 1984.
- Reel Cinemas – is a cinema chain company. Established in 2001, it was formerly known as Curzon.
- Regal Cinemas – was a cinema chain company.
- Reigate Waterworks Company – was a water supply company that operated from 1859 to 1896. It became part of East Surrey Water Company.
- Reliance Bank – is a bank offering mortgages, savings, and loans to The Salvation Army, individuals, charities, and businesses. Headquartered in London; it was founded in 1890 by William Booth as the Salvation Army Deposit Bank, and in 1891 was registered as the Salvation Army Bank. In 1901 it was renamed Reliance Bank Ltd. It is owned by The Salvation Army International Trustee Company, and the Salvation Army Trustee Company.
- RELX – is a British multinational information and analytics company headquartered in London. It provides scientific, technical, and medical information and analytics, legal information and analytics, decision-making tools, and organizes exhibitions. It is the world's largest publisher of academic articles and owns publications such as The Lancet and Cell. Previously named Reed Elsevier, it was founded in 1993 by the merger of Reed International, a British publisher, with Elsevier, a Netherlands-based publisher. Its subsidiaries are Elsevier, LexisNexis, Reed Exhibitions, and LexisNexis Risk Solutions. In 2022 its revenue was £8.5 billion, with a net income of £1.6 billion.
- Remus Films – was a film production company that operated from 1954 to 1958.
- ReNeuron – is a biotechnology company involved in stem cell therapies. Established in 1997, its headquarters is in Surrey.
- Renishaw – is an engineering company whose products include coordinate-measuring machines, and machine tool products. It is headquartered in Wotton-under-Edge, Gloucestershire. It was founded in 1973 by Sir David McMurtry and John Deer. In 2022 its revenue was £671 million, with a net income of £120 million.
- Rentokil Initial – is a business services company headquartered in Crawley, West Sussex. It was founded in 1925 by Harold Maxwell-Lefroy as a pest-control business. In 1957 it was acquired by British Ratin and became Rentokil Laboratories Ltd in 1960, and later renamed Rentokil Group. In 1996 it acquired British Electric Traction becoming Rentokil Initial and offering a range of business services. Its brands include Rentokil, Initial, Steritech, Ambius, Terminix, and Western Exterminator. In 2022 its revenue was £3.7 billion, with a net income of £232 million.
- Retirement Villages – is a developer and manager of retirement communities. Founded in 1981; it is headquartered in Leatherhead, Surrey. In 2017 it was acquired by Axa S.A..
- Retrogenix – is a biotechnology company involved in human cell microarray screening services. Established in 2008, its headquarters is in Sheffield. In 2021 it was acquired by Charles River Laboratories.
- RHA Audio – is a consumer electronics company offering audio products. Established in 2008, its headquarters is in Glasgow, Scotland.
- Richard Evans and Company – was a coal mining company that operated from 1730 to 1899.
- Richer Sounds – is a company that operates a retail store chain and retail website offering hifi, home cinema, and television products. It is headquartered in London. It was founded in 1978 by Julian Richer with the help of Vic Odden. In 2019 Richer stated that he had transferred company ownership to the employees by passing 60% of his shares to an employee ownership trust.
- Richwater Films – was a film production and distribution company that operated from 2013 to 2016. It was headquartered in London.
- Rightmove – is a real estate company that runs an online real estate property portal. Headquartered in London, it was founded in 2000. In 2022 its revenue was £332 million, with a net income of £195 million.
- Rio Tinto – is an Anglo–Australian multinational metals and mining corporation. Established in 1873, its headquarters are in London, UK and Melbourne, Australia. In 2019 its revenue was £43.1 billion, with net income of £6.9 billion.
- RIT Capital Partners – is an investment trust headquartered in Spencer House, Westminster, London. It was formerly the Rothschild Investment Trust and was founded in 1961 for investments by the English branch of the Rothschild family.
- River Island – is a company that produces and sells clothing and accessories for women, men, and children, and beauty products. It operates a multinational retail store chain, and a retail website. It is headquartered in London. It was founded in 1948 by Bernard Lewis, and the Lewis family still owns the company through the Lewis Trust Group. It was previously named 'Lewis Separates', and then 'Chelsea Girl' from 1965 to 1988 when it was renamed 'River Island'.
- Riversimple – is an automobile manufacturing company. Established in Ludlow, its headquarters is in Llandrindod Wells, Wales.
- RJB Mining – is a coal mining company. See UK Coal.
- Robert Fleming & Co. – was an asset manager and merchant bank. It was founded in 1873 by Robert Fleming in Dundee, Scotland as a series of investment trusts. Later it moved into merchant banking. In 1873 Robert Fleming co-founded the Scottish American Investment Company to invest in American railroad bonds. In 1909 Fleming's headquarters was relocated to London. In 1970 Fleming entered into an investment banking joint-venture with Jardine Matheson to form Jardine Fleming. In 2000 Robert Fleming Holdings was acquired by Chase Manhattan Bank who merged with JPMorgan in 2001 to form JPMorgan Chase. The asset management business was retained by JPMorgan Chase but Fleming Premier Banking was sold to Abbey National's Cater Allen subsidiary. Members of the Fleming family set up an asset management company named Fleming Family & Partners which, in 2014, merged with Stonehage Group to form Stonehage Fleming which became part of Corient.
- Robin Hood Energy – is a state owned non-profit energy supplier providing gas and electricity. Established in 2015, its headquarters is in Nottingham. It is owned by Nottingham City Council.
- Rocket Pictures – is a film and television production company. Established in 1996, its headquarters is in London.
- Rogue Films – is a film and television production company. Established in 1974, its headquarters is in London. It was formerly known as Drum Films.
- Rolls-Royce Holdings – is a holding company that owns Rolls-Royce, a British multinational engineering company that manufactures civil and military aero engines, marine propulsion systems, power generation equipment, and formerly luxury automobiles. Established in 2011, it is headquartered in London, and has 9 subsidiaries. It was formerly Rolls-Royce plc, and Rolls-Royce Group plc. In 2019 its revenue was £16.5 billion, with net income of £1.3 billion.
- Rolls-Royce Limited – was a manufacturing company involved in aerospace and automobile design and manufacture. Established in 1904 in Manchester, it was later headquartered in Derby. It was nationalised in 1971 until 1987 when it was privatised as Rolls-Royce plc.
- Rolls-Royce Motor Cars – is a luxury automobile manufacturing company. It is a subsidiary of BMW. Established in 1998, it is headquartered in Goodwood, West Sussex.
- Rolls-Royce Motors – was a luxury automobile manufacturing company that operated from 1973 to 1998. It was formerly part of Rolls-Royce Limited. It was acquired by Vickers in 1980, and sold to BMW in 1997.
- Romulus Films – was a film production company from 1948, then medicine production from 2013. It was established in 1948.
- Rosebank Industries – is an industrial recovery company that buys, improves and sells underperforming businesses. Headquartered in London; it was founded in 2024 by Simon Peckham and six former executives from Melrose Industries. It is listed on the London Stock Exchange.
- Rothschild & Company – is a multinational banking company that was founded in 1811. It is headquartered in Paris, France and London.
- Rotork – is a manufacturer of industrial flow control equipment including valve actuators, gearboxes, control systems, instrumentation, and accessories. It is headquartered in Bath, Somerset. It was founded in the 1940s. In 1968 it was floated on the London Stock Exchange. In 2022 its revenue was £641 million, with a net income of £93 million.
- Roxy Palace – was an online gambling company. Established in 2002, its headquarters was in London.
- Royal Bank of Scotland (RBS) – is a financial services company offering banking and insurance. Established in 1727, its headquarters is in Edinburgh, Scotland. In 1969, it merged with the National Commercial Bank of Scotland to form the National and Commercial Banking Group, which was later renamed the Royal Bank of Scotland Group and then NatWest Group. Its immediate parent company is NatWest Holdings, the "ring-fenced" business of NatWest Group.
- Royal Liver Assurance – was a friendly society with over 1.7 million members in the UK and Ireland. It was founded in 1850 by a group of liverpool working men in the Lyver Inn as the Liverpool Lyver Burial Society to provide decent internment for deceased members. It was renamed the Royal Liver Friendly Society and expanded throughout the UK and Ireland offering policies for funeral expenses, and other endowment and savings type products. The Royal Liver Building in Liverpool was built as its headquarters. In 1994 it was renamed Royal Liver Assurance. In 2011 it was merged into the Royal London Mutual Insurance Society.
- Royal London Mutual Insurance Society – is a mutual insurance and investment company. It is Britain's largest life and pensions mutual with £199 billion of assets under management in 2026. Headquartered in London; it was founded in 1861 by Joseph Degge and Henry Ridge as a friendly society named the Royal London Life Insurance and Benefit Society. Its acquisitions include: United Insurance Group, and Scottish Life in 2000, Scottish Provident, Scottish Mutual, and Phoenix Life Assurance from Resolution in 2008, Royal Liver Assurance in 2011, and the pensions and asset management business of The Co-operative Group in 2013.
- Royal Mail – is a British multinational postal service and courier company. Established in 1516 as a government department, its headquarters is in London.
- RS Group – is a distributor of industrial and electronics products and services headquartered in London. It was founded in 1937 by JH Warring and PM Sebestyen as Radiospares. In 1967 it was renamed Electrocomponents plc, until 2022 when it was renamed RS Group plc. Its brands include RS, RS Americas, Inc, and OKdo. In 2022 its revenue was £2.5 billion, with a net income of £230 million.
- RTW Biotech Opportunities – is an investment trust company focused on the biotechnology sector. Headquartered in London; it was established in 2019. It is managed by RTW Investments.
- Ruffels Pictures – was a film distribution company in the silent film era.
- Ruffer Investment Company – is an investment company focused on internationally listed equities and securities. Founded in 1994; it is headquartered in London.
- Ryde and Newport Railway – was a railway company established in 1872 that operated from 1875 to 1887 when it was merged with the Cowes and Newport Railway and the Isle of Wight (Newport Junction) Railway to form the Isle of Wight Central Railway.

== S ==
- S4C – is a UK government owned public service broadcaster and media corporation that operates the Welsh language free-to-air television channel S4C and the streaming service Click. Headquartered at Yr Egin, Carmarthen, Wales; it is the only solely Welsh language broadcaster in the UK. Its roots lay in the Welsh Language Television Council which planned for Welsh language broadcasting. The S4C was launched on 1 November 1982 as the fourth analogue channel in Wales under the control of the Welsh Broadcasting Authority. It had 22–25 hours of Welsh language programming per week mainly in prime-time with the remaining schedule filled with English programming from Channel 4 as that channel was unavailable in Wales. BBC Cymru Wales supplies 10 hours of Welsh language programming per week to S4C free of charge as part of the BBC's public service remit with other Welsh language programming coming from ITV Cymru Wales (previously HTV Wales) and independent production companies. Funding for the channel came from the Department of Culture, Media and Sport with a small amount of advertising revenue until 2013 when the funding burden was transferred mainly to the BBC from its television licence revenue. Following the digital switchover in Wales in 2010 Channel 4 was broadcast in Wales so S4C ceased broadcasting Channel 4 content and became a wholly Welsh language channel. From 2018 governance is from a unitary board.
- Safestore – is a self-storage company that operates storage sites. It is headquartered in Borehamwood, Hertfordshire. It was founded in 1998. In 2013 it was converted into a real estate investment trust. Its acquisitions include Mentmore plc, and Space Maker. In 2022 its revenue was £212 million, with a net income of £462 million.
- Saffron Building Society – is a building society offering mortgages, savings, investments, loans, and insurance. It is headquartered in Saffron Walden, Essex. It was founded in 1849 by the Revd. John Marten as the Saffron Walden Second Building Society. In 1968 it took over The Saffron Walden and Essex Mechanics Permanent Building Society. In 1972 it took over the Royston & District Building Society to become the Saffron Walden & District Building Society. In 1979 it merged with the London and Essex Building Society to become the Saffron Walden & Essex Building Society. In 1989 it merged with the Herts & Essex Building Society to become the Saffron Walden, Herts & Essex Building Society. In 2006 it was renamed the Saffron Building Society.
- Saga – is a company focused on people aged 50 and over that offers travel, insurance, and financial services. Saga Holidays provides package holidays and tours including its own cruise ships Spirit of Discovery and Spirit of Adventure. It also owns Titan Travel and Destinology. Saga Services offers a range of insurance products. Saga personal finance offers savings accounts, credit cards, share dealing, life assurance and other financial services. It also operates Saga SOS personal alarms, Metro Mail and Saga Magazine. It is headquartered in Folkestone, Kent. It was founded in 1951 by Sidney De Haan who passed it to his son Roger De Haan in 1984. In 2004 it was acquired by its staff and, in 2007, was merged with The AA to form Acromas Holdings until 2014 when they were demerged. In 2014 Saga Group was listed on the London Stock Exchange.
- Sage Group – is a British multinational enterprise software company headquartered in Newcastle upon Tyne. It was founded in 1981 by David Goldman, Paul Milford Muller, and Graham Wylie. Its subsidiaries include Sage Intacct. In 2022 its revenue was £1.9 billion, with a net income of £260 million.
- Sainsbury's (J Sainsbury plc) – is a company that operates supermarkets, convenience stores, banking services, catalogue retailer (Argos), and household furnishings retailer (Habitat)). Established in 1869, its headquarters is in Holborn, London. In 2019 its revenue was £29 billion, with a net income of £219 million.
- Sainsbury's Bank – is a financial services company. Established in 1997, its headquarters are in Edinburgh, Scotland, and London. It was first established as a joint venture between J Sainsbury plc and Bank of Scotland, then in 2014 Sainsbury's took full ownership.
- Saint John d'El Rey Mining Company – was a mining company with gold mining interests in Brazil). It operated from 1830 to 1985, and was headquartered in London. For a period it used slave labour.
- Salts Healthcare – is a manufacturing company producing ostomy and orthotic products, and formerly also surgeon's instruments and surgical appliances. Established in the 1700s in Wolverhampton, its headquarters is in Aston, Birmingham.
- Samuel Smith Old Brewery – is a family owned independent brewery and pub and hotel operator. It is headquartered in Tadcaster, North Yorkshire; and has history dating back to 1758. Since 1847 it has been owned and operated by the Smith family - from John Smith to Humphrey Smith and his son.
- Samvo Group – was a gambling company that operated from 2004 to 2017. It was headquartered in London.
- Sands Films – is a film production company. Established in 1975, its headquarters is in London.
- Sandscale Mining Company – was a mining company. Established in 1877, it is now defunct.
- Santander UK – is a financial services company offering mortgages, savings, and investments. Established in 2010, its headquarters is in Euston, London. It was formed by the merger of Abbey National with Bradford & Bingley and 3 months later with the Alliance & Leicester. Its parent company is Santander Group. In 2018 its revenue was £5.4 billion, with a net income of £1.3 billion.
- Savers Health & Beauty (trading as Savers) – is a company that operates a discount retail store chain and retail website offering health, beauty, household goods, and medical products. It is headquartered in Dunstable, Bedfordshire. It was founded in 1988 and expanded through the 1990s including the acquisition of the Supersave retail store chain. In 2000 it was acquired by AS Watson which is owned by CK Hutchison Holdings. AS Watson also owns Superdrug and converted many Savers stores to Superdrug stores.
- Savills – is an estate agent, and real estate services company. It is headquartered in London. It was founded in 1855 by Alfred Savill. In 1997 it was merged with First Pacific Davies in Asia. In 1998 it bought majority stakes in the German, French, and Spanish operations of Weatherall, Green & Smith. Its acquisitions include Smiths Gore, GBR Phoenix Beard, Larry Smith Italia, and Aguirre Newman SA. In 2022 its revenue was £2.2 billion, with a net income of £119 million.
- Schroder Asian Total Return Investment Company – is an investment trust company focused on the Asia Pacific region excluding Japan. Headquartered in London; it was established in 1987 as the TR Pacific Investment Trust under the management of Touche Remnant. In 1992 Henderson Group acquired Touche Remnant and, in 1997, renamed the trust the Henderson TR Pacific Investment Trust and then, in 2012, the Henderson Asian Growth Trust. Schroders took over the management in 2013 and renamed it Asian Total Return Investment Company before adopting its current name in 2016. In 2026 it was merged with Pacific Assets Trust.
- Schroder AsiaPacific Fund – is an investment trust focused on Asia and Pacific bordering countries (excluding the Middle East, Japan, and Australasia). It was founded in 1995 and is managed by Schroders.
- Schroder Oriental Income Fund – is an investment trust focused on the Asia Pacific region. Founded in 2005; it is managed by Schroders.
- Schroders – is a British multinational asset management company that previously offered banking. Established in 1804, its headquarters is in London. In 2025 it had £823 billion of assets under management. In 2026 it was acquired by Nuveen.
- Schuh – is a company that operates a footwear retail store chain, and a retail website. It also has its own footwear brand. It is headquartered in Livingston, Scotland. It was founded in 1981 by Sandy Alexander. In 1986 it was acquired by Goldbergs. In 1990 it was the subject of a management buy-out which formed Schuh Ltd. In 2011 it was acquired by Genesco.
- ScotRail – is a Scottish passenger train operating company that is publicly owned by Scottish Rail Holdings on behalf of the Scottish Government. Headquartered in Glasgow; it began operating in 2022.
- ScotRail (National Express) – was the national passenger train operating company of Scotland between 1997 and 2004. It was owned by National Express.
- Scott Free Productions – is a British-American film and television production company. Established in 1970, its headquarters is in London. It was formerly known as Scott Free Enterprises, and as Percy Main Productions.
- Scottish American Investment Company – is an investment trust headquartered in Edinburgh, Scotland. It was founded in 1873 by William Menzies. It is managed by Baillie Gifford & Co.
- Scottish Building Society – is a building society that provides banking and financial services. It is headquartered in Edinburgh, Scotland. It was founded in 1848 as the Edinburgh Property Investment Company. In 1929 it was renamed the Scottish Building Society. In 2013 it was merged with Century Building Society.
- Scottish Hydro Electric – was an energy company generating and supplying electricity and gas. It operated from 1989 to 1998. Headquartered in Perth, Scotland, it was formed from the North of Scotland Hydro-Electric Board. It was acquired by SSE in 1998.
- Scottish Mortgage Investment Trust – is a financial services company providing investment management. Established in 1809, its headquarters is in Edinburgh, Scotland. It was formerly known as the Straits Mortgage and Trust Company. It is managed by Baillie Gifford.
- Scottish Nuclear – was an energy company providing electricity by nuclear power generation from 1990 to 1996. It was formerly part of the South of Scotland Electricity Board. It became part of British Energy and Magnox Electric.
- Scottish Power – is an energy company generating, supplying, and distributing electricity. Established in 1990, its headquarters is in Glasgow, Scotland. It was formed mainly from the South of Scotland Electricity Board. Its parent company is Iberdrola.
- Scottish Rail Holdings – is a Scottish government-owned holding company based in Glasgow. It was established in 2016 and took over the ScotRail franchise in 2022 and the Caledonian Sleeper franchise in 2023.
- Scottish Water – is a state owned utility company supplying water and disposing of sewage. Established in 2002, its headquarters is in Dunfermline, Scotland. It was formed by a merger of West of Scotland Water Authority, East of Scotland Water Authority, and North of Scotland Water Authority. It is owned by the Scottish Government.
- Screwfix (trading as Screwfix) – is a company that operates a retail store chain, retail website, and mail order catalogue offering building trade tools, accessories, and hardware, DIY and home improvement products, and garden supplies. It is headquartered in Yeovil, Somerset. It was founded in 1979 by Jon Goddard-Watts as the Woodscrew Supply Company. In 1992 it was renamed 'Screwfix Direct'. In 1999 it was acquired by Kingfisher who remain its owners.
- SDCL Efficiency Income Trust – is an investment trust company focused on energy efficiency projects. Headquartered in London; it was founded in 2018. It is managed by Sustainable Development Capital.
- Seabrook Potato Crisps – is a producer of crisps, headquartered in Bradford, West Yorkshire. It was founded in 1945 by Charles Brook in Allerton, West Yorkshire. Since October 2018 it is owned by Calbee UK. In 2017 it had a net income of £27 million.
- Secure Trust Bank – is a bank offering savings, personal and business banking, and loan products such as motor finance, retail point of sale loans, commercial finance, real estate finance, asset finance, and invoice finance. Headquartered in Solihull, West Midlands; it was founded in 1952 as Secure Homes Ltd. In 1985 it was made a subsidiary of the Arbuthnot Banking Group. In 1994 it was renamed the Secure Trust Bank, and in 2011 it was floated on the London Stock Exchange.
- See-Saw Films – is a British-Australian film and television production company. Established in 2008, its headquarters is in London.
- SEEBOARD – was an energy company supplying electricity that operated from 1947 to 2002. It was formerly the South Eastern Electricity Board. In 2002 it became part of 24seven.
- Segro – is a multinational property and investment company that develops and invests in business space, and industrial property. Established in 1920, its headquarters is in London. It was formerly known as Slough Trading Company Ltd, and as Slough Estates Ltd. In 2019 its revenue was £432 million, with net income of £860 million.
- Selfridges – is a company that operates four luxury department stores in London, Manchester and Birmingham, and a retail website. It is headquartered in Oxford Street, London. It was founded in 1908 by Harry Gordon Selfridge who opened the Selfridges, Oxford Street store in 1909. In 1926 Selfridge Provincial Stores was started which included a number of regional stores until it was sold to the John Lewis Partnership in 1940. In 1951 John Lewis acquired the remaining Oxford Street store and then added a store in Ilford, London that was later sold. In 1965 John Lewis including Selfridges was acquired by Sears who opened an additional store in Oxford which was rebranded to John Lewis in 1986. In 1990 Selfridges was demerged from Sears and then a new store was opened at the Trafford Centre, Manchester. In 2002 another store was opened at Exchange Square, Manchester, and in 2003 a new store was opened at the Bull Ring, Birmingham. In 2003 Selfridges was acquired by Galen Weston and included in Selfridges Group which also contained Brown Thomas, Arnotts, Holt Renfrew and De Bijenkorf. In 2021 the majority of Selfridges Group was acquired by a joint venture between Central Group and Signa Holding.
- Senior – is the holding company for a set of global firms who design and manufacture technology components and systems for companies in the aerospace, defence, land vehicle, and power and energy sectors. Headquartered in Rickmansworth, Hertfordshire; it was founded in 1933 by a group of employees from Green's Economisers Ltd. In 1947 it was listed on the London Stock Exchange as Senior Economisers Ltd. Its acquisitions include: GAMFG Precision, Atlas Composites, Thermal Engineering, UPECA Technologies, Lymington Precision Engineering, and Steico Industries. In 2026 Senior accepted a takeover proposal from Tinicum Inc. and Blackstone Private Investment Advisors.
- Sequoia Economic Infrastructure Income Fund – is an investment trust company focused on debt instruments for infrastructure projects. Headquartered in Saint Peter Port, Guernsey; it was established in 2015. It is managed by Sequoia Investment Management Company.
- Seraphim Space Investment Trust – is an investment trust company focused on space technology such as satellite monitoring and communications. Headquartered in London; it was founded in 2021 when it had an initial public offering on the London Stock Exchange.
- Serco – is a British multinational company that fulfills a diverse range of UK and international government outsourcing contracts. These include defence, transport, health, education, space, justice, migration, customer services, leisure facilities, recycling, and waste collection. It is headquartered in Hook. It was founded in 1929 as RCA Services Limited - a UK division of the RCA Corporation - which initially provided technical services to the cinema industry. During WWII it supplied technical and engineering services to the British War Office and during the Cold War supplied defence systems, engineering and facilities management to the government. Following a management buy-out it was renamed Serco in 1987 and diversified its operations.
- SES Water – is a utility company supplying water. Established in 1996, its headquarters is in Redhill, Surrey. Formerly known as Sutton and East Surrey Water, it was formed from the merger of East Surrey Water and Sutton District Water.
- Seven Arts Pictures – was a film production company. Established in 2002, it was later liquidated. It was headquartered in London.
- Seven Cars Limited – is the former name of automobile manufacturer Caterham Cars.
- Seven Seas – is a manufacturing company producing vitamins, minerals and health and fitness supplements. Established in 1935 in Hull, its headquarters is in Feltham, London. Formerly known as British Cod Liver Oil Producers (BCOL), it was acquired by Imperial Tobacco in 1974, Hanson Trust in 1986, Merck Group in 1996, and Procter & Gamble in 2019.
- Severn Trent – is a utility company supplying water. Established in 1989, its headquarters is in Coventry. It was preceded by Severn Trent Water Authority. In 2019 its revenue was £1.7 billion, with net income of £315 million.
- Severn Trent Water Authority – was a state owned utility company supplying water. It operated from 1974 to 1989. Headquartered in Birmingham, it was preceded by Derwent Valley Water Board, and succeeded by Severn Trent.
- SGN – is an energy company supplying gas. Established in 2005, its headquarters is in Horley. It was formerly known as Scotia Gas Networks.
- Shaftesbury Capital – is a property investment and development company focused on sites in the West End of London including: Covent Garden, Seven Dials, Chinatown London, and Soho. Headquartered in London; it was founded in 2023 by the merger of the property companies Capital & Counties Properties and Shaftesbury PLC. Capital & Counties Properties was incorporated in 1933, while Shaftesbury was founded in 1986. It is listed on the London Stock Exchange and the Johannesburg Stock Exchange.
- Shakerley Collieries – was a coal mining company. It operated from c1850s to 1935. It became part of Manchester Collieries.
- Shawbrook Bank – is a bank offering savings, loans, and business finance. Headquartered in London; it was founded in 2011 when a group of investors acquired Whiteaway Laidlaw Bank from Manchester Building Society and rebranded it as Shawbrook Bank. Its parent company is Shawbrook Group plc which is owned by a consortium led by BC Partners and Pollen Street Capital.
- Sheffield Coal Company – was a coal mining company. It operated from 1805 to 1961. It was headquartered in Sheffield, South Yorkshire. In 1937 it was acquired by United Steel Companies, then became part of the National Coal Board in 1947, and became defunct in 1961.
- Sheffield Film Cooperative – was a film and radio production cooperative. Established in 1975, its headquarters was in Sheffield.
- Shepherd Building Group – is a company that manufactures, leases, and sells modular buildings such as its Portakabin and Portaloo brands. It is headquartered in York, North Yorkshire. It was founded in 1890 by Frederick Shepherd and remains a Shepherd family business. It diversified from house building to general contracting and in 1934 was incorporated as F Shepherd & Son Ltd. During WWII it fulfilled government contracts. After the war until the 1950s its work was mainly in the public sector. In 1962 it was reorganised as Shepherd Group Ltd and was a main contractor in many industries. From the 1950s it introduced and manufactured a number of prefabricated, relocatable buildings such as Portasilo, and Portakabins. From 2015 it retained the Portakabin division but sold or closed the other divisions. In 2020 its revenue was £345 million, with a net income of £64 million.
- Shepherd Neame Brewery – is a brewery headquartered in Faversham, Kent. It produces cask ales, and filtered beers. It also owns 305 pubs and hotels in South East England. Captain Richard Marsh founded it in 1698. Samuel Shepherd bought the brewery in 1741 and through a number of family generations expanded and modernised it. Percy Beale Neame joined the brewery in 1864 and five generations of his family have run the business with the latest being Jonathan Neame. Beers produced include Bishops Finger, and Spitfire. It also brews international lagers under license, distributes other alcoholic beverages, and collaborates with Sheppys to produce Orchard View Apple Cider.
- Shepperton Studios – is a film studio. Established in 1931 at Shepperton, Surrey, it was first named Sound Film Producing and Recording Studios. It was also formerly known as Sound City. It is owned by the Pinewood Group.
- Shine TV (UK) – is a television production company. Established in 2001, its headquarters is in London.
- Shire – is a pharmaceuticals company involved in drug development and production. Established in 1986 in Basingstoke, it moved its company registration to Ireland in 2008. It was acquired by Takeda Pharmaceutical Company in 2018.
- Shoe Zone – is a company that operates a budget footwear store chain, and retail website. It is headquartered in Leicester, Leicestershire. It was founded in 1917, and formerly named Bensonshoe. Its acquisitions include: The Oliver Group plc, Shoefayre, Stead & Simpson, and others. In 2022 its revenue was £156 million, with a net income of £13 million.
- SHS International – is a pharmaceuticals company offering advanced medical nutrition products. Established in 1879 in Liverpool, it was formerly known as Powell & Scholefield. In 1990 it was acquired by Valio Oy, and then by Nutricia in 1995.
- Sierra Rutile – is a mining company operating in Sierra Leone. It was founded in 1971 as Titanium Resources Group. It was renamed Sierra Rutile in 2011. In 2016 it was acquired by Iluka Resources.
- Sigma Films – is a film production company. Established in 1996, its headquarters is in Glasgow, Scotland.
- Silver Vision – is a DVD and video distribution company. Owned by Clear Vision Ltd, it became defunct in 2014.
- Silverback Films – is a natural history film and television production company based in Bristol. It was founded in 2012 by Alastair Fothergill and Keith Scholey. Its productions include: Ocean with David Attenborough, Life on Our Planet, Parenthood and The Dinosaurs. In 2020 it launched the Studio Silverback division to make films addressing the world's environmental issues. In 2020 it was acquired by All3Media until 2026 when All3Media was merged into Banijay Entertainment where it became part of Banijay UK Productions.
- Siva Motor Car Company – was an automobile manufacturing company that operated from 1970 to 1976. It was headquartered in Aylesbury.
- Sirhowy Valley Foods – is a snack food manufacturer. It was founded in 1997 as Real Crisps. In 2007 it was purchased by Tayto (Northern Ireland).
- Sirius Minerals – is a mining company involved in mining minerals, and fertiliser development. It was established in 2003. In March 2020 it was acquired by Anglo American.
- Skipton Building Society – is a building society offering mortgages, savings, and insurance. Headquartered in Skipton, North Yorkshire; it was founded in 1853. It acquired the Barnoldswick & District Permanent Building Society in 1942; the Ribblesdale Permanent Building Society in 1966, and the Bury Building Society in 1974. In 1996 it acquired the estate agents Connells Group. In 2009 it merged with the Scarborough Building Society, then the Chesham Building Society in 2010.
- Sky Betting & Gaming – is an online gambling company. Established in 2002, its headquarters is in Leeds. It is owned by Flutter Entertainment.
- Slater Menswear – also referred to as Slaters, is a company that operates a menswear store chain, and retail website. It is headquartered in Glasgow, Scotland. It was founded in 1904 by Samuel Slater and remains owned and run by the Slater family.
- Smith & Nephew – is a multinational manufacturing company producing medical equipment products for advanced wound management, arthroscopy, trauma and clinical therapy, and orthopedic reconstruction. Established in 1856, its headquarters is in Watford, Hertfordshire. In 2019, its revenue was £5.1 billion, with net income of £600 million.
- Smith Electric Vehicles – was a manufacturing company producing electric trucks, trams, milk floats, ice-cream floats, fork lifts, and taxis. It operated from 1920 to 2017. Originally headquartered in Washington, its headquarters was moved to Kansas City, Missouri US. It was formerly known as Northern Coachbuilders (NCB).
- Smiths Group – is an engineering company producing detection sensors, mechanical seals, couplings, hydrodynamic bearings, filtration systems, medical devices, electric components, heating and ducting systems; and previously timepieces, diamonds, automotive instrumentation and accessories, aerospace and marine instrumentation. Established in 1851, its headquarters is in London. It was formerly known as S. Smith & Sons, and as Smith Industries. In 2019 its revenue was £2.4 billion, with a net income of £227 million.
- Smithson Investment Trust – is an investment trust headquartered in London. It was founded in 2010. In 2023 it has £43 billion worth of assets under management.
- Snaffling Pig – is a snack food company producing pork scratchings, and other snacks. Headquartered in Ashampstead Common, Berkshire, it was founded in 2013 as The Giggling Pig.
- Society of Mines Royal – was a metals mining company that operated from 1568 to circa 1750. It was probably merged with the Company of Mineral and Battery Works in 1669.
- Softcat – is an information technology infrastructure provider. It also created the Explain IT podcast. It is headquartered in Marlow, Buckinghamshire. It was founded in 1993 by Peter Kelly in High Wycombe as Software Catalogue. In 2022 its revenue was £1 billion, with a net income of £110 million.
- Sofology – is a company that manufactures and sells furniture. It operates a furniture retail store chain and retail website. It is headquartered in Golborne, Greater Manchester. It was founded in 1974 as CLS Sofas. It was later renamed 'Clayton Salesrooms', 'CS Lounge Suites Ltd', 'Sofaworks', and finally 'Sofology' in 2016. In 2017 it was acquired by DFS Furniture.
- Solocrest – is the former name of sports car and motorbike manufacturer Ariel Motor Company.
- Somerfield – was a groceries retail company that operated from 1875 to 2011. Headquartered in Bristol and then Manchester, it was previously known as J.H. Mills, and Gateway Supermarkets. In 1988 it acquired Kwik Save before selling the brand in 2006. In 2009 it was purchased by The Co-operative Group and continued as a brand name until 2011.
- Somerset Film – is a film production and training company. Established in 1997, its headquarters is in Bridgwater, Somerset.
- Sound City – is a film studio. See Shepperton Studios.
- Sound Film Producing and Recording Studios – is a film studio. See Shepperton Studios.
- South Devon Railway – was a railway company operating from 1846 to 1876.
- South Essex Waterworks Company – was a utility company supplying water. It operated from 1861 to 1970. In 1970 it merged with the Southend Waterworks Company to form the Essex Water Company.
- South East Water – is a utility company supplying water. Established in 1992, its headquarters is in Snodland, Kent.
- South of Scotland Electricity Board (SSEB) – was a state owned energy company generating and supplying electricity. It operated from 1954 to 1991. In 1955 it absorbed the South West Scotland Electricity Board, and the South East Scotland Electricity Board. It became part of Scottish Nuclear and Scottish Power.
- South Staffordshire Water – is a utility company supplying water. Established in 1853, its headquarters is in Walsall, West Midlands. It was formerly known as the South Staffordshire Waterworks Company.
- South Wales Railway – was a railway company operating from 1850 to 1863.
- South West Water – is a utility company supplying water and treating sewage. Established in 1989, its headquarters is in Exeter, Devon. It was preceded by the South West Water Authority. Its parent company is the Pennon Group.
- Southend Waterworks Company – was a utility company supplying water. It operated from 1871 to 1970. In 1970 it merged with the South Essex Waterworks Company to form the Essex Water Company.
- Southern Electric – was an energy company supplying electricity. It operated from 1970 to 1998. Headquartered in Reading, Berkshire, it was formed from the Southern Electricity Board. It was succeeded by Scottish and Southern Energy.
- Southern Railway (SR) – was a railway company operating from 1923 to 1948. It was one of the Big Four.
- Southern Water – is a utility company supplying water supply and treating sewage. Established in 1989, its headquarters is in Worthing, West Sussex. It was preceded by the Southern Water Authority. Its parent company is Southern Water Capital.
- Southwark and Vauxhall Waterworks Company – was a utility company supplying water. It operated from 1845 to 1903. Headquartered in London, it was formed from the merger of the Southwark, and Vauxhall water companies. It became part of the Metropolitan Water Board.
- Spark Energy – was an energy company supplying electricity, gas, and telecommunications. It operated from 2007 to 2018. Headquartered in Selkirk, Scottish Borders, it become part of OVO Energy.
- Spartoo UK – is an e-commerce website specialising in shoes and clothing created in 2009. It is part of the company Spartoo.com which was created in 2006 and based in Grenoble, France.
- Speakit Films – is a film production company, established in 2004.
- Specsavers – is an optometry company that operates a multinational retail chain of dispensing opticians clinics. It also sells hearing aids. Most of their clinics are joint venture partnerships, with the others operating as franchises. It is headquartered in Saint Andrew, Guernsey. It was founded in 1984 by married couple Doug Perkins and Mary Perkins. In 2004 it acquired the Blic Optic franchise.
- Spectris – is a manufacturer of precision instrumentation, controls, and other engineering products. It is headquartered in London. It was founded in 1915 by Charles Richard Fairey as an aeroplane manufacturer named the Fairey Aviation Company. In the 1990s the company was re-focused on electronics products. In 2001 it was renamed Spectris plc. In 2022 its revenue was £1.3 billion, with a net income of £401 million.
- Speymalt Whisky Distributors – is a producer of Scotch whisky and a bottling company. Trading as Gordon & MacPhail, it is headquartered in Elgin, Moray, Scotland. It was founded in 1895.
- Spin TV – is a television production company. Established in 2007, its headquarters is in Soho, London.
- Spirax Group (formerly Spirax-Sarco Engineering) – is a manufacturing company that produces steam management systems, peristaltic pumps, and associated fluid path technologies. Established in 1888, its headquarters is in Cheltenham, Gloucestershire. It was formerly known as Sanders, Rehders & Co. (SARCO), then Spirax-Sarco Engineering. In 2024 it was renamed Spirax Group.
- Spire Healthcare – is a private healthcare company that operates hospitals, clinics, and GP surgeries. It is headquartered in London. It was founded in 2007 by the sale of Bupa hospitals to Cinven. It was floated on the London Stock Exchange in 2014. In 2022 its revenue was £1.1 billion, with a net income of £8.2 million.
- Sportech – is a gambling company (online gambling). Established in 2000, its headquarters is in London.
- Sports and Leisure Management (trading as Everyone Active) – is a company that manages over 200 leisure centres on behalf of local authorities and trusts. It also provides several public health services under the brand Everyone Health. Headquartered in Hinckley, Leicestershire; it was founded in 1987 by Stephen Hulme.
- Spreadex – is a gambling company. Established in 1999 in Dunstable, its headquarters is in St Albans.
- S Records – was the former name of record label company Syco Music.
- SSE – is an energy company generating electricity and gas. Established in 1998, its headquarters is in Perth, Scotland. It was formed from a merger of Scottish Hydro Electric and Southern Electric. It was formerly known as Scottish and Southern Energy. In 2019 its revenue was £7.3 billion, with net income of £1.4 billion.
- SSL International – was a manufacturing company producing healthcare products. It operated from 1999 to 2010. Headquartered in London, it was formed by the merger of Seton Scholl and LIG. In 2010 it was acquired by and folded into Reckitt Benckiser.
- SSP Group – is a multinational food service company that operates catering and retail units as well as fulfilling catering contracts. It is headquartered in London. It was founded in 1961 as a division of airline company SAS Group named SAS Catering. Its Select Services Partner (SSP) division was acquired by Compass Group in 1993. It was then acquired by EQT Infrastructure in 2006 and then floated on the London Stock Exchange in 2014. In 2022 its revenue was £2.1 billion, with a net income of £9.9 million.
- St James Place – is a financial services company providing wealth management. Established in 1991, its headquarters is in Cirencester, Gloucestershire. It was formerly known as J Rothschild Assurance Group. In 2019 its revenue was £16.5 billion, with net income of £187 million.
- Stafford Railway Building Society – is a building society offering mortgages, savings, and investments. Headquartered in Stafford, Staffordshire; it was founded in 1877.
- Stagecoach Group – is a British transport group headquartered in Perth, Scotland. Established in 1980; it operates buses, express coaches, and trams in the UK. In 2022 it was bought by a DWS Group managed investment fund.
- Stallergenes Greer – is a multinational pharmaceuticals company involved in immunotherapy. Established in 2015, its headquarters is in London. It was formed by the merger of Stallergenes and US Greer Laboratories.
- Standard Bank – was a multinational banking company mainly operating in Africa. It operated from 1862 to 1969. Headquartered in London, it was formerly known as Standard Bank of British South Africa. In 1969 it was merged with Chartered Bank of India, Australia and China to form Standard Chartered Bank.
- Standard Chartered – is a British multinational universal bank providing consumer and commercial banking. Established in 1969, its headquarters is in London. It was formed from the merger of Chartered Bank of India, Australia and China with Standard Bank. In 2019 its revenue was $15.4 billion, with net income of $2.3 billion.
- Standard Life (formerly Phoenix Group Holdings) – is an insurance company headquartered in London. It was founded in 1857 as The Pearl Loan Company. In 1914 it was renamed The Pearl Assurance Company and later as Pearl Group. In 2008 it acquired Resolution Life including its Phoenix Assurance business. In 2010 it was renamed Phoenix Group Holdings. In 2018 it acquired Standard Life Assurance, and in 2021 it acquired the Standard Life brand. It also owns SunLife. In 2026 it was renamed Standard Life.
- Stanley Leisure – is a gambling company. Established in the 1950s, its headquarters is in Belfast.
- Stanleybet International – is a gambling company. Established in 1997, its headquarters is in Liverpool.
- Starling Bank – is an online bank offering personal and business banking services such as current accounts, and loans. Headquartered in London; it was founded in 2014 by Anne Boden. Its acquisitions include: Fleet Mortgages, and the mortgage book of Masthaven. In 2023 its revenue was £453 million, with a net income of £142 million.
- Staveley Coal and Iron Company – was a coal mining, iron works, and chemicals company. It operated from 1863 to 1960. Headquartered in Staveley, Derbyshire, it was also known as Staveley Iron and Chemical Company. In 1960 it was acquired by Stewarts & Lloyds and merged with Stanton Ironworks to become Stanton and Staveley which was nationalised into the British Steel Corporation in 1967.
- Stephenson Clarke Shipping – was a shipping company involved in short sea bulk cargo. It operated from 1730 to 2012. Headquartered in Newcastle upon Tyne, it was the U.K.'s oldest shipping company.
- Stevens Vehicles – is an automobile manufacturing company. Its headquarters is in Port Talbot, Wales.
- SThree – is an international recruitment company specialising in the information technology, banking and finance, life sciences, engineering, and energy sectors. It is headquartered in London. It was founded in 1986 by Bill Bottriell and Simon Arber. In 2005 it was floated on the London Stock Exchange. Its brands include Computer Futures, Progressive, Real Staffing Group, and Huxley Associates. In 2022 its revenue was £1.6 billion, with a net income of £54 million.
- Stiff + Trevillion – is a London-based architectural practice, founded in 1981.
- Stolen Picture – is a film and television production company. Established in 2016, its headquarters is in London.
- Stoll Film Studios – was a film studio. See Cricklewood Studios.
- Stoll Pictures – was a film production and distribution company, established in 1918.
- Strange Company – was a machinima production and distribution company, headquartered in Edinburgh, Scotland.
- STV Group – is a Scottish media company active in broadcast television, streaming television, and television programme production. It holds the regional television licenses for central and north Scotland. Headquartered in Glasgow; it was founded in 1957 as Scottish Television. It was renamed Scottish Media Group in 1996, then SMG in 2000, then STV Group in 2008. The company expanded into newspapers but later these operations were divested. Its programme production division is STV Studios while STV Creative produces commercials and other promotional content.
- STV Studios – is the television programme production division of STV Group. Headquartered in Glasgow; it was founded in 1957 by Roy Thomson as Scottish Television Enterprises. In 2020 it was rebranded as STV Studios. It has 19 subsidiaries. Its better known programmes include Taggart, Take the High Road, Blue Lights, Antiques Road Trip, and Catchphrase.
- Suffolk Building Society – is a building society offering mortgages, savings, investments, and insurance. It is headquartered in Ipswich, Suffolk. It was founded in 1849 as the Ipswich & Suffolk Freehold Land Society, and later became the Ipswich and Suffolk Permanent Benefit Building Society, and then the Ipswich & Suffolk Building Society. In 1975 it merged with the Ipswich & District Building Society to become the Ipswich Building Society until 2020 when it was renamed the Suffolk Building Society.
- Suited Caribou Media – is a film post-production company. Established in 2013, its headquarters is in Glasgow, Scotland. It was formerly known as Mr Q Media.
- Superdrug – is a company that operates a health and beauty products retail store chain and retail website. It also provides pharmacy services, nurse clinics, its own products brand, and a mobile virtual network. It is headquartered in Croydon, London. It was founded in 1964 by brothers Ronald Goldstein and Peter Goldstein as Leading Supermarkets Ltd before being renamed Superdrug later that year. In 1987 it was acquired by Woolworth Holdings which would later become Kingfisher. In 1988 it acquired Tip-Top retailers, and Share Drug Stores plc. In 2001 it was acquired by Kruidvat which was later acquired by AS Watson which is owned by CK Hutchison Holdings. AS Watson also owns Savers and they converted 300 Savers stores to Superdrug stores while converting some of Superdrugs smaller stores to Savers.
- Superdry – is a company that operates a clothing retail store chain, and a retail website. It also has its own clothing brand. It is headquartered in Cheltenham, Gloucestershire. It was founded in 2003 by Julian Dunkerton and James Holder. It was floated on the London Stock Exchange in 2010. In 2018 Supergroup plc was renamed Superdry plc.
- Supermarket Income REIT – is a real estate investment trust company that invests in retail property and holds a portfolio of supermarket buildings. Headquartered in London; it was founded in 2017 when it was listed on the London Stock Exchange. It is advised by Atrato Capital.
- Sutton District Water – was a utility company supplying water. It operated from 1863 to 1996. Headquartered in Sutton, London, it was formerly known as Sutton and Cheam Water Company. In 1996 it was merged with East Surrey Water Company to become Sutton and East Surrey Water.
- Swansea Building Society (Welsh: Cymdeithas Adeiladu'r Abertawe) – is a building society offering mortgages, savings, and loans. Headquartered in Swansea, Wales; it was founded in 1923.
- SWEB Energy – was an energy company supplying electricity. It operated from 1990 to 2006. It was formed from the South Western Electricity Board. In 1999 it was acquired by EDF Energy.
- Swizzels – is a confectionery manufacturer. Established by brothers Maurice and Alfred Matlow in 1928 in London, it is now based in New Mills, Derbyshire. In 2019 its revenue was £78.6 million, with a net income of £10 million.
- Syco Entertainment – is an entertainment company involved in film and television production. It was established in 2005 and headquartered in London. Its subsidiary Syco Music, a record label, was absorbed by Sony Music in 2020.
- Sylva Autokits – is a kit cars manufacturing company. Established in 1981, its headquarters is in Lincolnshire.
- Syncona – is a closed-ended investment trust company focused on the life sciences sector. Headquartered in Saint Peter Port, Guernsey; it was founded in 2012 by former CEO Martin Murphy and the Wellcome Trust as Syncona Partners. In 2016 it was merged with the Battle Against Cancer Investment Trust.
- Syncopy Inc. – is a film production company. Established in 2001, its headquarters is in London.
- Sweetapple – is a marketing and public relations company. Established in 2002, its headquarters is in London.

== T ==
- Talkback Productions – was a television production company founded in 1981 by comedians Mel Smith and Griff Rhys Jones. It specialised in comedy productions with some factual programmes. Its comedy productions include: Alas Smith and Jones, Brass Eye, Da Ali G Show, Green Wing, I'm Alan Partridge, Murder Most Horrid, Never Mind the Buzzcocks, QI, Smack the Pony and others. Headquartered in London; in 2000 it was sold to Pearson Television which later became Freemantle Television. In 2003, Freemantle merged Talkback Productions with Thames Television to form Talkback Thames. In 2012 Talkback Thames was split into four production companies: Boundless, Retort, Talkback, and Thames. In 2025, Talkback was again merged with Thames to reform Talkback Thames which produces comedy and factual programmes.
- Tandem Money – operates Tandem Bank which is a digital bank with no branches. It offers savings, mortgages, and loans. Headquartered in Blackpool, Lancashire; it was founded in 2014 by Ricky Knox, Matt Cooper, and Michael Kent. Its acquisitions include: Harrods Bank, Pariti Technologies, Allium Lending Group, the mortgage book of Bank and Clients, Oplo, and Loop Money.
- Taff Vale Railway – was a railway company operating from 1840 to 1922.
- Tanat Valley Light Railway – was a railway company operating from 1904 to 1921. A new company runs a heritage railway since 2009.
- Tanfield Group – is an automobile manufacturing company involved in electric vehicles, and specialist engineering. Established in 2003, its headquarters is in Tyne and Wear. It was formerly known as Comeleon.
- Target Healthcare REIT – is a real estate investment trust company that invests in healthcare properties and owns a portfolio of care homes. Headquartered in London; it was founded in 2013 via a launch on the London Stock Exchange.
- Tarmac Group – was a multinational company involved in building materials, road construction, maintenance subcontractors, and housebuilding. It operated from 1903 to 2013. Headquartered in Wolverhampton, West Midlands, it was formerly known as the Tar Macadam Syndicate. In 2013 it was merged with the UK assets of Lafarge to form Lafarge Tarmac which became Tarmac.
- Tarmac – is a building materials company. Established in 2013, its headquarters is in Solihull. It was formed from the merger of Tarmac Group with the UK assets of Lafarge. It was formerly known as Lafarge Tarmac. Its parent company is CRH.
- Tata Steel Europe – was a steel production company. Established in 1999, its headquarters was in London. It was formerly known as Corus Group which was formed by the merger of British Steel and Koninklijke Hoogovens. Its parent company was Tata Steel. Since 2020 its UK operations are part of Tata Steel UK.
- Tate & Lyle – is a global supplier of food and beverage ingredients to industrial markets. It produces sweeteners such as sucralose, fructose, and allulose; texturants such as starch, and gums; health and wellness ingredients; and stabilisers and functional systems. It is headquartered in London. It was founded in 1921 by the merger of rival sugar refiner companies Henry Tate & Sons and Abram Lyle & Sons. It was a sugar refiner and producer of sugar based products such as Lyle's Golden Syrup. From the 1970s it began diversifying into commodity trading, transport, and engineering. In the 2000s it diversified into producing starches and other food ingredients, as well as biomaterials. In 2010 it sold its sugar refining business. It owns 49.9% of Primient, a subsidiary of several components, formed in 2022, which it sold the majority interest in to KPS Capital Partners. In 2022 its revenue was £1.3 billion, with a net income of £236 million.
- Tayto – is a privately owned manufacturer of crisps and corn snacks, headquartered in Tandragee, County Armagh, Northern Ireland. It was founded in 1956.
- Taylor Wimpey – is a construction company involved in housebuilding. Established in 2007, its headquarters is in High Wycombe, Buckinghamshire. It was formed from the merger of Taylor Woodrow and George Wimpey. In 2019 its revenue was £4.3 billion, with net income of £673 million.
- Taylor Woodrow – was a multinational construction company involved in housebuilding, civil and commercial construction. It operated from 1921 to 2007. Headquartered in London, in 2007 it was merged with George Wimpey to form Taylor Wimpey.
- Teachers Building Society – is a building society offering mortgages, savings, and insurance. It is headquartered in Wimborne Minster, Dorset. It was founded in 1966 when the National Union of Teachers acquired the London Scottish Building Society in order to offer mortgages to teachers. It is still focused on the teaching profession, and the education sector.
- Teddington Studios – was a film and television studios complex that operated from the 1910s to 2014. It was located in London.
- Telecom Plus – is a utility company involved in gas and electricity supply, landline and mobile telephony, and broadband. Established in 1996, its headquarters is in London. In 2019 its revenue was £804 million, with net income of £32 million.
- Telford Homes – is a house building company that specialises in non-prime areas of London. It was founded in 2000. In 2019 it was acquired by Trammell Crow Company.
- Tempean Films – was a film and television production company that operated from 1948 to 1961. Its headquarters was in London.
- Temple Bar Investment Trust – is an investment trust focused on UK securities. It was founded in 1926.
- Templeheart Films – is a film finance and production company established in 2008.
- Templeton Emerging Markets Investment Trust – is an investment trust company focused on global emerging markets. Headquartered in Edinburgh, Scotland; it was founded in 1989. It is managed by Franklin Templeton Investment Management which is a subsidiary of Franklin Templeton.
- Terra Firma Capital Partners – is a private equity company with £4.7billion in assets. Established in 2002, its headquarters is in London. It was formerly part of Nomura Principal Finance Group.
- Tesco Bank – is a financial services company offering banking and insurance. Established in 1997, its headquarters is in Edinburgh, Scotland. It was formerly known as Tesco Personal Finance. Its parent company is Tesco.
- Thames Trains – was a train operating company owned by Go-Ahead Group which worked the Thames franchise from October 1996 to the end of March 2004. Its main services were from London Paddington over Greater London and South East England with other services in the East Midlands, South West England and the West Midlands. In April 2003, the Strategic Rail Authority invited First Group and Go-Ahead to bid for a two year franchise until the end of the Thames franchise when it would become part of a larger Greater Western franchise. In November 2003, the two year franchise was awarded to First Group with the Thames Trains services transferring to First Great Western Link on 1 April 2004.
- Thames Water – is a utility company supplying water and treating sewage. Established in 1989, its headquarters is in Reading, Berkshire. It was formerly part of the Thames Water Authority and other publicly owned water companies. Its parent company is Kemble Water Holdings.
- Thameslink – was a train operating company owned by Govia that worked the Thameslink franchise between March 1997 and March 2006. It operated services from Bedford via the Thameslink route to Moorgate, Sutton, Wimbledon and Brighton. A new Thameslink Great Northern franchise was created which was won by First Group to operate First Capital Connect which took over the Thameslink services on 1 April 2006. Govia won back the Thameslink franchise in 2014 under Govia Thameslink Railway until 2026 when it was renationalised as Greater Thameslink Railway.
- Thatchers Cider – is a cider producer based in Sandford, Somerset. It also processes blackcurrants. It was founded in 1904 by William Thatcher and is still owned and run by the Thatcher family.
- Theatre Workshop Scotland – is a theatre and film production company. Established in 1965, it is located in Edinburgh, Scotland. It was formerly known as Theatre Workshop Edinburgh.
- The Bank of London Group (trading as The Bank of London) – operates The Bank of London which is a clearing, correspondent, and wholesale bank in business in the UK, US, and Europe. It is headquartered in 100 Bishopsgate, City of London. It was founded by Anthony Watson, and launched in 2021.
- The Bath & Racquets Club Ltd — operates the private members gym and squash club the Bath & Racquets Club, at Brook's Mews, Mayfair, London. It was founded in 1989 by Mark Birley who sold it together with his other Mayfair clubs to Richard Caring in 2007.
- The Body Shop – is a company that produces cosmetics, skin care products, perfumes, bath products, and household products. It has a multinational retail store chain including both company owned stores, and franchises. It also has a retail website, and direct sales network. It was founded in 1976 by Anita Roddick. In 1984 it was entered on London's Unlisted Securities Market before being floated on the London Stock Exchange. In 2006 it was acquired by L'Oréal who sold it to Natura & Co. In 2023, Natura sold it to Aurelius. In February 2024 the UK division of The Body Shop was put into administration and later put up for auction. In March 2024, the US operations in the United States were closed while the Canada division was put under bankruptcy protection. The remainder of The Body Shop was acquired by Auréa Group in September 2024.
- The Cambridge Building Society – is a building society offering mortgages, savings, and insurance. It is headquartered in Cambridge, Cambridgeshire. It was founded in 1850 as the Cambridgeshire Permanent Benefit Building Society. In 1945 it was renamed The Cambridge Building Society.
- The Cumberland – is the trading name of Cumberland Building Society.
- The Distillers Company – was a Scottish whiskey producer. It had previously manufactured pharmaceuticals, chemicals, and plastics. It operated from 1877 to 1986, with its headquarters in Edinburgh, Scotland, it was acquired by Guinness in 1986 to form United Distillers. It is now part of Diageo.
- The Energy Group – was an energy company generating and distributing electricity and was also a gas supplier. It operated from 1990 to 1998. Headquartered in London, it was acquired by Texas Utilities.
- The Entertainer – is a toys retail store chain and retail website. It also owns the brands ToyZone, Gamleys, and Totally Toys. It is headquartered in Amersham, Buckinghamshire. It was founded in 1981 by married couple Catherine and Gary Grant. In 2019 it acquired Early Learning Centre. It is owned by Teal Group Holdings.
- The GlenAllachie Distillers Company – is a producer of Scotch whisky that owns the GlenAllachie distillery in Aberlour, Scotland. It was founded in 2017.
- The Gym Group – is a company that operates a health club chain. Headquartered in Croydon, London; it was founded in 2007 by John Treharne. In 2015 it was floated on the London Stock Exchange.
- The Imaginarium (aka Imaginarium Productions) – is a film production and performance capture company. Established in 2011, its headquarters is in London.
- The Light Entertainment – is a UK cinema chain company established in 2007 and headquartered in London. It also operates in Saudi Arabia under the MUVI brand.
- The Melton Building Society (trading as Melton Building Society) – is a building society offering mortgages, savings, investments, and insurance. Headquartered in Melton Mowbray, Leicestershire; it was founded in 1875. It has a subsidiary named MBS Lending Ltd.
- The Mill – is a film company producing visual effects, and creative content. It was established in 1990.
- The Mob – is a television and commercials production company.
- The Nottingham – is the trading name of the Nottingham Building Society.
- The Oxford Artisan Distillery – is a distillery company. Established in 2017, its headquarters is in Oxford.
- The People's Operator (TPO Mobile) – was a telecommunications company operating a mobile virtual network from 2012 to 2019. It was headquartered in London.
- The Perfume Shop – is a company that operates a perfume retail store chain and retail website. It is headquartered in High Wycombe, Buckinghamshire. Originally named EauZone; it was renamed The Perfume Shop in 1992. In 2005 it was acquired by AS Watson which is owned by CK Hutchison Holdings.
- The Range (listed as C.D.S (Superstores International) Ltd) – is a company that operates a retail store chain and retail website offering a large number of products in the home, garden, and leisure categories such as homewares, furniture, curtains and blinds, diy, toys, art supplies, and more. It also produces products for its own brand. It is headquartered in Plymouth, Devon. It was founded in 1989 by Chris Dawson as C.D.S. Superstores. In 2023 it acquired Wilko's brand, website, and intellectual property, and later announced that it would open five Wilko branded stores. In 2024, it acquired the Homebase brand and 49 stores from administration.
- The Rank Group – is a gambling company that operates casinos, bingo, and online gambling. It was formerly also operating as a film producer, cinema chain, engineering and leisure company. Established in 1995, its headquarters is in Maidenhead. In 2019 its revenue was £695.1 million, with net income of £27.6 million.
- The Rank Organisation – was an entertainment company involved in film production and distribution, a cinema chain, and electrical manufacturing. It operated from 1937 to 1996, and was headquartered in London.
- The Renewables Infrastructure Group – is an investment trust company focused on assets generating electricity from renewable sources. Headquartered in Saint Peter Port, Guernsey; it was established in 2013. It is managed by InfraRed Capital Partners.
- The Schiehallion Fund – is an investment trust company focused on later-stage private businesses. Headquartered in Guernsey; it was founded in 1999. It is managed by Baillie Gifford & Co.
- The Smith's Snackfood Company – is a British-Australian snack food company owned by PepsiCo. It was founded in 1920 in Cricklewood, London as Smith's Potato Crisps Ltd. The Australian subsidiary was founded in 1932 and is headquartered in Chatswood, New South Wales. In 1998 PepsiCo bought the company and removed most of the Smith's branding by moving most of Smith's products to the Walkers branding. The Australian division continues to use the Smith's branding as Smith's Chips.
- The Tinopolis Group – is a television production and distribution company. It owns 13 production companies in various genres, and the distributor Passion Distribution. As well as its UK companies it owns several in the US. Every year it produces over 4,500 hours of television programmes. Headquartered in Llanelli, Wales; it was founded in 1990 by Ron Jones. In 2005 it acquired Mentorn Media including its parent group Television Corporation. In 2011 it entered the US market through the acquisition of A Smith & Co. Productions.
- The Tote – is a gambling company. Established in 1928, its headquarters is in Wigan.
- the West Brom – is the trading name of the West Bromwich Building Society.
- The Works – is a company that operates a discount retail store chain and retail website offering books, arts and crafts products, gifts, toys, games, and stationery. It is headquartered in Coleshill, Warwickshire. It was founded in 1981 by Mike and Jane Crossley as 'Remainders Limited'.It entered administration in 2008 and was acquired by Endless LLP. In 2015 Dean Hoyle became majority shareholder and chairman. In 2018 it was floated on the London Stock Exchange.
- THG (formerly The Hut Group) – is a global retailer and brand owner operating two mainly online divisions: THG Beauty, and THG Nutrition. THG Beauty sells own-brand and third party cosmetics while THG Nutrition sells sports nutrition supplements including Myprotein as well as health and wellness products. Both divisions have their own product development and manufacturing facilities for both own-brand and third-party products. Headquartered in Manchester; it was founded in 2004 by Matthew Moulding and John Gallemore. Initially it sold DVDs and CDs online and then designed websites for physical retailers. It went on to purchase and operate a wide variety of online retailers. Later the group focused on beauty and lifestyle products. In 2020 it was listed on the London Stock Exchange with an initial public offering. In 2024 it sold its luxury division including designer clothing, accessories, and homeware web stores Allsole, Coggles, My Bag, and The Hut to Frasers Group. In 2025 its THG Ingenuity division was demerged into a separate private business which included: online marketplace Preloved, THG Ingenuity Cloud Services, THG Fluently, Eclectic Hotel Group, Arrow Films, plastics recycling centre Preston Plastics, and newspaper City AM and other businesses.
- Thin Man Films – is a film production company. Established in 1988, its headquarters is in London.
- Thorn EMI Screen Entertainment – was a film production, and distribution company. See EMI Films.
- Thornton & Ross – is a pharmaceuticals company producing medicines, disinfectant, and health treatments. Headquartered in Linthwaite, West Yorkshire, in 2013 it was acquired by Stada Arzneimettel.
- Tide – is a fintech business company offering banking services. Established in 2015, its headquarters is in London.
- Tiger Racing – is an automobile manufacturing company producing kit cars. Established in 1989 in London, its headquarters is in Wisbech, Cambridgeshire. It was formerly known as Tiger Cars. In 2022 it was acquired by DR Automobiles.
- Tigerlily Films – is a film and television production company established in 2000.
- Tigon British Film Productions (aka Tigon) – was a film production and distribution company. Established in 1966, its headquarters was in London.
- Tilia Homes – is a house building company headquartered in Solihull, West Midlands. It was founded in 2021 when Kier Living (the housing division of the Kier Group) was acquired by Terra Firma Capital Partners. In 2024 Terra Firma merged Tilia Homes with Hopkins Homes to form the company Untypical.
- Tipton & Coseley Building Society – is a building society offering mortgages, and savings. Headquartered in Tipton, West Midlands; it was founded in 1901.
- Titanium Resources Group – is the former name of Sierra Rutile.
- TJ Morris – is a company that owns the discount store chain Home Bargains. It is headquartered in Liverpool, and was founded in 1976 by Tom Morris. In 2023 it acquired Quality Save.
- tombola – is a gaming company. Established in 1999, its headquarters is in Sunderland. In 2022 it was acquired by Flutter Entertainment.
- Tooting, Merton and Wimbledon Railway – was a railway company established in 1864 to connect Streatham and Wimbledon and jointing owned by the London and South Western Railway and the London, Brighton and South Coast Railway. Along with its parent companies, the railway was merged into the Southern Railway in 1923.
- Total Car Parks – is a company that operates car parks. It was established in 2008, and is headquartered in Colchester, Essex.
- Total Fitness – is a company that operates a chain of health clubs. Headquartered in Wilmslow, Cheshire; it was founded in 1993 by Albert Gubay. In 2004 it was acquired by Legal & General who sold it to North Edge Capital in 2015.
- TP ICAP Group – is a financial services group including: Tullett Prebon, ICAP, PVM Oil, COEX Partners, and Parameta Solutions. Tullett Prebon acts as an intermediary in wholesale financial markets, and provides data information services. ICAP trades in a number of financial markets. PVM Oil is a broker for crude oil and refined products. COEX Partners offers trade advice and execution services in specific markets. Parameta Solutions provides market data and analytics. Headquartered in London; it was founded in 1971 by Derek Tullett as a foreign exchange broker trading as Tullett & Riley. In 1999 it was merged with Liberty Brokerage to form Tullett Liberty. It was acquired by Collins Stewart plc in 2003 to form Collins Stewart Tullett; which, in 2004, acquired Prebon Yamane and adopted that name. In 2006 the group was demerged into two separate companies: Tullett Prebon, specialising in money broking, and Collins Stewart as a stockbroking company. In 2015 Tullett Prebon plc acquired ICAP's voice brokerage and information business and, in 2016, was renamed TP ICAP. In 2021 it acquired Liquidnet.
- Trainline – is a company that operates a digital railway and coach technology platform that sells train tickets and rail cards. It also provides travel information. It is headquartered in London. It was founded in 1997 by the Virgin Group. In 2004 it merged with Qjump. In 2024 its revenue was £396.7 million, with a net income of £34 million.
- Transport for Wales Rail – is a state owned Welsh train operating company that, from February 2021, operates all passenger mainline services within Wales and services from Wales into North West England, West Midlands and South West England. It manages all Welsh railway stations. It is a subsidiary of the Welsh Government owned company Transport for Wales. On 7 February 2021 it succeeded KeolisAmey Wales to operate the Wales & Borders franchise after it became commercially unviable due to the COVID-19 pandemic. One of its major projects is the development and operation of the South Wales Metro.
- Travis Perkins – is a builders' merchant and home improvement retailer with a chain of stores. It is headquartered in Northampton, East Midlands. It was founded in 1988 by the merger of Travis & Arnold with Sandell Perkins. Its subsidiaries include Toolstation, Keyline, BSS, Benchmarx, and CCF. In 2024 its revenue was £4.6 billion, with a net income loss of £77 million.
- Tredegar Iron and Coal Company – was an iron works and coal mining company. It operated from 1797 to 1946. It was formerly known as Sirhowy Iroworks. In 1946 it was nationalised into the National Coal Board.
- Trespass – is a clothing brand and the trading name of Jacobs & Turner Ltd.
- Triga Films – is a pornographic film production company. It was established in 1997.
- Triking – is an automobile manufacturing company. Headquartered in Hingham, Norfolk, it was formerly known as Triking Cyclecars.
- Tritax Big Box REIT – is a real estate investment trust headquartered in London that invests in distribution centres. It was founded in 2013 and is managed by Tritax which is a property management company established in 1995. In 2024 it was merged with UK Commercial Property REIT.
- Tropic Skincare – is a company that designs, manufactures and sells vegan skincare, hair care, and cosmetics products. It operates a multi-level marketing system. It is headquartered in Croydon, London. It was founded in 2007 by Susie Ma as Tropic Pure Plant Skincare. After Ma competed in The Apprentice, Alan Sugar became a joint partner until 2023 when Ma bought his shares for full ownership.
- TR Property Investment Trust – is an investment trust focused on the property sector. Headquartered in London, it was founded in 1905. It is managed by Thames River Capital LLP which since 2024 is part of Columbia Threadneedle Investments.
- TUI AG – is an Anglo-German multinational travel, hospitality, and tourism company operating travel agencies, hotels, airlines, cruise ships, and retail stores. Established in 1923, its headquarters are in Hanover, and Berlin, Germany. It was originally known as the Prussian Mine and Foundry Company. Its 2024 revenue was €23.1 billion, with net income of £507 million.
- TUI Airways – is an airline company. Established in 1962, its headquarters is in Luton, Bedfordshire. It was formerly known as Britannia Airways and also as Thomsonfly. Its parent company is TUI AG.
- Tunnock's (Thomas Tunnocks Ltd) – is a private limited confectionery company producing biscuits and cakes. Established in 1890, its headquarters is in Uddingston, Glasgow, Scotland.
- TVF Media – is a film and television production company. Established in 1983, its headquarters is in London.
- TVR – is an automobile manufacturing company specialising in sports cars. Established in 1946 in Blackpool, its headquarters is in Walliswood, Surrey. It was formerly known as Trevcar Motors, TVR Engineering, and Layton Sports Cars. Its sister companies are Grantura Engineering, Grantura Plastics, and TVR Parts.
- Twentyfour Income Fund – is an investment trust company focused on less liquid, higher yield investments. Headquartered in Saint Peter Port, Guernsey; it was established in 2013. It is managed by Twentyfour which is part of Vontobel. In 2024 it was merged with UK Mortgages Ltd which was wound up.
- Twickenham Studios – is a film and television studios. Established in 1913, it is located in London.
- Two Cities Films – is a film production company that was established in 1937.
- Tyldesley Coal Company – was a coal mining and brick works company that operated from 1870 to 1947. Headquartered in Tyldesley, in 1947 it was nationalised into the National Coal Board.
- Tyman – is a manufacturer of building products. It is headquartered in London. It was founded in 1993 by Stephen Dean as a property services company named Dean & Bowes (Homes) Ltd. In 1999 the property services business was sold and the company became an investment business named Lupus Capital. From 2006 it acquired a number of building products companies and became a building products manufacturer. In 2013 it was renamed Tyman plc. In 2024 it was acquired by Quanex.
- Tyrrells – is a manufacturer of crisps and other snacks. It was founded in 2002 by William Chase in Leominster, Herefordshire. Since May 2018 it is owned by KP Snacks.

== U ==
- UK Coal – was a coal mining, gas production, and renewable energy company from 1974 to 2015. Headquartered in Harworth, Nottinghamshire, it was formerly RJB Mining. It was succeeded by Harworth Group, a land and property company.
- UK Commercial Property REIT – was a real estate investment trust investing in UK commercial property. Founded in 2006; it was headquartered in London. In 2024 it was merged into Tritax Big Box REIT.
- UKTV (UKTV Media Limited) – is a multi-channel broadcasting and media company headquartered in London. Its pay-TV channels are U&Gold, and U&Alibi while it's free-to-air channels are U&Dave, U&Drama, U&W, U&Yesterday, and U&Eden. It also operates the streaming service U. While many programmes are from the BBC archives, they also broadcast new programming and have commissioned original programmes, such as Dynamo: Magician Impossible, Taskmaster, and the rebooted series of Bergerac. Its channels carry advertising and sponsorships. Since 2019 it is a wholly owned subsidiary of BBC Studios. It was founded in 1992 as a joint venture between the BBC and Thames Television to create UK Gold which carried programming from both companies back catalogues. Before it launched on 1 November 1992, Cox Enterprises took a 65% share in return for underwriting the launch costs. Later, United Artists Holdings became a part owner which transferred to Flextech which by 1996 had an 80% share. In 1997 Flextech and the BBC partnered to launch a new range of channels on 1 November 1997 under the brand UKTV. Flextech became part of Virgin Media which sold its then 50% stake in UKTV to Scripps Networks Interactive which became part of Discovery Communications. In 2019, BBC Studios acquired Discovery's stakes in the seven entertainment-based UKTV channels and the UKTV brand for £173 million while Discovery would acquire BBC Studios stakes in the remaining channels: Good Food, Home, and Really. In 2024 the channels were rebranded as U.
- UK Power Networks – is an energy company providing electricity distribution. Established in 2010, its headquarters is in London. It was formerly part of EDF Energy Works.
- Ulster Bank – is a financial services company offering banking and insurance. Established in 1836, its headquarters is in Belfast, Northern Ireland. It was formerly known as the Ulster Banking Company. Its parent company is NatWest Holdings, the "ring-fenced" business of NatWest Group.
- Umbro – is a sports equipment manufacturer based in Manchester. Established in 1924, since 2012 is a subsidiary of Iconix Brand Group.
- Underground Electric Railways Company of London – was a holding company established in 1902 to construct and operate underground railways in London. It controlled the Baker Street and Waterloo Railway, the Central London Railway, the Charing Cross, Euston and Hampstead Railway, the City and South London Railway the Great Northern, Piccadilly and Brompton Railway, the London Electric Railway and the Metropolitan District Railway, forming the core of the London Underground, and the London General Omnibus Company the principal bus operator. In 1933, the company and its subsidiaries were taken into public ownership and formed part of the London Passenger Transport Board.
- Unilever – is a British multinational consumer goods company with brands including beauty products, personal care products, cleaning agents and food and beverages. Established in 1929 by the merger of Margarine Unie and Lever Brothers, it is headquartered in London.
- Unite Students – is a provider of purpose built student accommodation in the U.K. It was founded in 1991 by Nicholas Porter in Bristol where it is now headquartered. In 2019 it was acquired by Liberty Living. In 2024 its revenue was £299 million, with a net income of £441 million.
- United Biscuits – is a British multinational food manufacturer specialising in biscuits and other snackfood under brands such as McVitie's, Jacob's, Twiglets, and Carr's. It was established in 1948 by a merger of McVitie's & Price with MacFarlane Lang. Following a number of acquisitions and changes in ownership, in 2014 it was acquired by Yıldız Holding and is now a subsidiary of Pladis. Headquartered in London, its 2022 revenue was £857 million with a net income of £50 million.
- United House Developments – is a property development and house building company headquartered in London. It is focused on the construction of social housing, urban re-generation, refurbishment, and public—private partnerships. It was reorganised as United House Group. In 2014 it merged its construction business, United House Ltd, with Bullock Construction to form United Living Group. Later in 2014, United House Developments became a separate development company.
- United Living Group – is a construction, utilities, and property maintenance company. It is headquartered in Swanley, Kent. It was founded in 2014 from the merger of Bullock Construction with United House Ltd (the construction division of United House Group). In 2019 United Living merged with Fastflow Group, remaining as United Living Group.
- United Steel Companies – was a steel making, engineering, and coal mining company from 1918 to 1967. It was nationalised in 1967.
- United Utilities – is a utility company supplying water and treating sewage. Formerly it also supplied electricity. Established in 1995, its headquarters is in Warrington. It was founded by the merger of North West Water and NORWEB. Its 2024 revenue was £1.9 billion, with a net income of £126 million.
- Unity Trust Bank – is a bank that offers specialist financial services to trade unions, charities, other not-for-profit organisations, and ethical businesses. Headquartered in Birmingham; it was founded in 1984 as Unity Trust Ltd. It is owned by individual trade unions and federations, and other investors. Until 2014 The Co-operative Bank had a 26% stake.
- Untypical – is a house building company headquartered in Solihull, West Midlands. It was founded in 2024 when Terra Firma merged Tilia Homes with Hopkins Homes to form the company Untypical.
- Unusuality Productions – is a film production company. Established in 2005, its headquarters is in London.
- Urban Logistics REIT – is a property investment company which invests in warehouses. Founded in 2016; it is headquartered in London. In 2025 it was acquired by LondonMetric Property.
- Utilico Emerging Markets – is an investment trust company focused on infrastructure, utility, and related sectors in global emerging markets. Headquartered in Epsom, Surrey; it was established in 2005. It is managed by ICM.

== V ==
- Vale of Rheidol Light Railway – was a railway company operating from 1902 to 1913.
- Valley Lines – was the trading name of the Cardiff Railway Company that was a train operating company that ran local services around Cardiff and the South Wales Valleys from October 1996 to October 2001. It was owned by Prism Rail until July 2000 when it came under National Express who had acquired Prism Rail. As part of the Strategic Rail Authority's plans for a single all-Wales franchise; in 2001 most of the Welsh operations of the Wales & West franchise were merged with those of Valley Lines to create Wales and Borders. The Valley Lines brand continued to be used alongside Wales & Borders until the franchise passed to Arriva Trains Wales in December 2003.
- Vandyke Productions – was a film production company that operated between 1947 and 1956/1960.
- Vanquis Banking Group – is a bank that specialises in subprime lending via credit cards, loans, and consumer vehicle finance, as well as offering savings accounts. Headquartered in Bradford, West Yorkshire; it was founded in 1880 as the Provident Clothing and Supply Company. It was renamed Provident Financial. In 1978 it diversified by starting a chain of estate agents under the brandname Whitegate which were sold to Legal & General in 1989. It founded Vanquis Bank in 2002 to specialise in credit cards. In 2007 it demerged its international business into the company International Personal Finance. In 2023 it was renamed Vanquis Banking Group.
- Vauxhall Motors – is an automobile manufacturing company. During WWII it produced tanks and military lorries. Established in 1857 at Vauxhall, London, its headquarters is in Chalton, Bedfordshire. It was formerly known as Alex Wilson & Company, and also as Vauxhall Iron Works. In 1925 it was bought by General Motors, then sold to PSA Group in 2017, and becoming part of Stellantis in 2021.
- Veolia Water Central – was a utility company supplying water that operated from 1994 to 2012. Headquartered in Hatfield, Hertfordshire, it was formed as Three Valleys Water from the merger of the Colne Valley, Rickmansworth, and Lee Valley water companies. In 2012 it was merged into Affinity Water.
- Veolia Water East – was a utility company supplying water that operated from 1989 to 2012. Headquartered in Manningtree, it was formerly known as Tendring Hundred Water Services. In 2012 it was merged into Affinity Water.
- Veolia Water Southeast – was a utility company supplying water that operated from 1848 to 2012. Headquartered in Folkestone, Kent, it was formerly known as Folkestone & Dover Water Services. In 2012 it was merged into Affinity Water.
- Verity Films – was a documentary film production company. Established in 1940, its headquarters is in London.
- Vernalis – was a pharmaceuticals company producing prescription drugs. It operated from 2003 to 2018. Headquartered in Winnersh, Berkshire, it was formerly British Biotech. In 2018 it was acquired by Ligand Pharmaceuticals.
- Vernon Building Society – is a building society offering mortgages, and savings. Headquartered in Stockport, Greater Manchester; it was founded in 1924.
- Vertigo Films – is a film production and distribution company. Established in 2002, its headquarters is in London.
- Vesuvius – is a materials technology company that manufactures products such as ceramics for steelmakers and foundries, and the glass and solar energy industries. It is headquartered in London. It was founded in 1704 by Isaac Cookson as a group of metal and glass businesses in Tyneside. In 1851 it expanded into lead manufacturing. In 1924 it was merged with Lock Lancaster and W.W. & R.Johnson & Sons to form Associated Lead Manufacturers which was floated on the London Stock Exchange in 1930. In 1966 it was renamed Lead Industries Group, and in 1982 renamed as Cookson Group. In 1987 it acquired the Vesuvius Crucible Company. In 2005 it was refocused on high technology products. In 2012 it was renamed Vesuvius plc, and the performance materials division was demerged to form Alent. In 2024 its revenue was £1.8 billion, with a net income of £100 million.
- Victrex – is a manufacturer and supplier of high performance polymers for a number of industries including: aerospace, automotive, electronics, oil and gas, and medical. It is headquartered in Cleveleys, Lancashire. It was founded in 1993 as a management buy-out of the Peek polymer business of Imperial Chemical Industries (ICI). In 2024 its revenue was £291 million, with a net income of £15.8 million.
- ViiV Healthcare – is a pharmaceuticals company producing HIV drugs. Established in 2009, its headquarters is in Brentford. It is a subsidiary of GSK (76.5%), Pfizer (13.5%), and Shionogi (10%).
- Vince & Son – was a transport manufacturing company including coachbuilding, motor buses, and ex-government vehicles. It operated from 1868 to 1988 with its headquarters in Ely, Cambridgeshire.
- Virgin Active – is a company that operates a multinational chain of health clubs. Headquartered in London; it was founded in 1998 by Richard Branson and Matthew Bucknall. In 2015 80% of the company was sold to South African investment company Brait, owned by Christo Wiese.
- Virgin Group – is a British multinational venture capital conglomerate. Founded in 1970, its headquarters is in London.
- Virgin Cinemas – was a cinema chain company that operated from 1995 to 2002.
- Virgin Films – was a film production and distribution company operating from 1979 to 1993.
- Virgin Games – was an online gambling company, established in 2003.
- Virgin Media – is a telecommunications and mass-media company operating digital television, broadband internet, fixed line telephony, and mobile telephony. Established in 2006, its headquarters is in Hook, Hampshire. It was formerly known as NTL-Telewest. Since 2013 it is a subsidiary of Liberty Global.
- Virgin Money UK – is a financial services company. It was formerly known as CYBG plc. Its 2019 revenue was £1.7 billion, with net income of £194 million.
- Viridor – is a waste management, recycling and renewable energy company. Established in 1956, its headquarters is in Taunton, Somerset. It was formerly known as Harrison Western, and also as Haul Waste. Its parent company is Pennon Group.
- Vision Express – is an optometry company that operates a multinational retail chain of dispensing opticians clinics. The clinics are either company-owned or joint venture partnerships. It is headquartered in Ruddington, Nottinghamshire, and was founded in 1988. In 1997 it was acquired by Grand Vision which is owned by EssilorLuxottica. Its acquisitions include: Batemans Opticians, Crown Eyeglass, Rayner & Keeler, Conlons Opticians, and Tesco opticians which became VE@Tesco.
- Vistry Group – is a housebuilding company headquartered in Kings Hill, Kent. It was founded in 2019 by the merger of Bovis Homes and Galliford Try's housing businesses. In 2022 it acquired Countryside Partnerships. Its revenue in 2022 was £2.7 billion, with a net income of £204 million.
- Vodafone – is a British multinational telecommunications company including fixed line telephone, mobile phone, broadband, digital television, internet television, and IPTV. Established in 1991, it has headquarters in London and Newbury, Berkshire. It has 1 division (Vodafone Global Enterprise) and 41 subsidiaries. Its predecessors were Racal Telecom, and Racal Vodafone Holdings, with the Vodafone brand introduced in 1985. Vodafone Group has also traded as Vodafone Airtouch. Its 2019 revenue was €43.6 billion, with net income of –€7.6 billion.
- Volution Group – is a manufacturer of ventilation equipment for commercial and residential customers. It is headquartered in Crawley, West Sussex. It was founded in 2002 when HSBC Private Equity acquired the Air Movement and Cable Management business of Smiths Group. In 2006 it was acquired by ABN AMRO, and then by TowerBrook Capital Partners in 2012. Its brands include Vent-Axia. In 2022 its revenue was £307 million, with a net income of £35 million.
- Vue Cinemas – is a cinema chain company. Established in 2003, its headquarters is in Chiswick, London.

== W ==
- Waitrose – is a supermarket chain founded in 1904 as Waite, Rose & Taylor. It was purchased in 1937 by the John Lewis Partnership and is now headquartered in Bracknell, Berkshire, and Victoria, London. In 2022 its total revenue was £6.9 billion, with an operating income of £1.02 billion.
- Wales & West – was a train operating company that worked the South Wales & West franchise from 1996 to 2001. Originally named South Wales & West; it was owned by Prism Rail until July 2000 when it was acquired by National Express. Its main services were in Wales and South West England with some services in the West Midlands, North West England, the South Coast and London Waterloo. As part of the Strategic Rail Authority's plans for a single all-Wales franchise, in 2001 most of Wales & West's services in Wales were transferred to Wales and Borders (previously Valley Lines), while other services focused on South West England remained with Wales & West which was renamed Wessex Trains.
- Wales & West Utilities – is an energy company (gas supplier). Established in 2005, its headquarters is in Newport, Wales. It was formerly part of National Grid. It is owned by CK Infrastructure Holdings.
- Wales and Borders was a train operating company owned by National Express that worked the Wales & Borders franchise from October 2001 to December 2003. The Strategic Rail Authority reorganised the Valley Lines and Wales & West franchises so that Valley Lines became Wales and Borders from October 2001. The services of Valley Lines were combined with most of Wales & West's Welsh services, the Cambrian line services from Central Trains and, from September 2003, the North Wales Coast line services from First North Western. It had services across most of Wales, and some in the West Country, as well as Alphaline services to Liverpool Lime Street, Manchester Piccadilly, Birmingham International, and London Waterloo. In 2003, the Strategic Rail Authority awarded the new franchise to Arriva with Wales and Border services transferred to Arriva Trains Wales on 7 December 2003.
- Walkers – is a snack food manufacturer whose products include crisps and other savoury snacks. It was founded in 1948 in Leicester by Henry Walker. In 1989 Walkers was acquired by Frito-Lay, a division of PepsiCo.
- Walkers Shortbread – is a Scottish manufacturing company that mainly produces biscuits such as shortbread, cookies, and crackers. It was founded in 1898 in Torphins, Scotland by Joseph Walker. Still owned and managed by the Walker family, its headquarters is in Aberlour, Scotland.
- Walthamstow Studios – was a film studios company from 1914 to 1930. Its headquarters was in Walthamstow, London.
- Walturdaw Company Limited – was a film production, distribution, and film equipment company from 1901/4 to 1925. Its headquarters was in London.
- Warburtons – is a private baking company that is the best selling bakery brand in the United Kingdom. It was established in 1876 by Thomas Warburton and is headquartered in Bolton, Greater Manchester.
- Warp Films – is a film and TV production company. Established in 2001, its headquarters are in Sheffield and London. See also Warp X.
- Warp Records – is a record label. Established in 1989, its headquarters was in Sheffield, and then London.
- Warp X – is a film production company (sister company of Warp Films). Established in 2005, its headquarters was in Sheffield, then Nottinghamshire, and then London.
- Warwick Films – was a film productioncompany operating from 1951 to 1962. Its headquarters was in London.
- Warwick Trading Company – was a film production and distribution company operating from 1898 to 1915. Its headquarters was in London.
- Watches of Switzerland – is a retailer of Swiss watches that operates a chain of stores. It is headquartered in Braunstone Town, Leicestershire. It was founded in 1924 in Ludgate Hill, London. In 1988 it was acquired by Ratner Group and then sold to Asprey in the early 1990s. In 1998 it was the subject of a management buyout, and then acquired by Baugur Group in 2005. It was then bought by Landsbanki in 2009 before coming under the control of Apollo Global Management in 2013. It was briefly known as Aurum Holdings. In 2022 its revenue was £1.2 billion, with a net income of £101 million.
- Water Plus – is a water retail company providing water supply and sewage for businesses. Established in 2016, its headquarters is in Stoke-on-Trent. It is a joint venture between United Utilities and Severn Trent Water.
- Waterstones – is a company that operates a book shop chain, and a retail website. It also sells stationery, and has an instore cafe chain branded 'Cafe W'. It is headquartered in Piccadilly, London. It was founded in 1982 by Tim Waterstone. In 1993 it was acquired by WHSmith. In 1998 it was acquired by HMV Media plc (later HMV Group) which also acquired Dillons and Ottakar's and merged them into Waterstones. In 2011 it was acquired by A&NN Capital Fund Management owned by Alexander Mamut. In 2018 Elliott Management Corporation bought a majority stake in Waterstones. As well as Dillons, and Ottakar's its acquisitions include: Books Etc., Blackwell's, Hatchards, Hodges Figgis, and Foyles.
- Weir Group – is a Scottish multinational engineering company headquartered in Glasgow. It was founded in 1871 by brothers George and John Weir as G & J Weir Ltd, manufacturing pumping equipment. In World War I it manufactured munitions, aircraft, and war materiel. In later years it diversified into the oil and gas industry and mining. In 2022 its total revenue was £2.4 billion, with a net income of £213 million.
- Well Pharmacy – is a retail and pharmaceutical company providing pharmaceuticals, healthcare, and beauty products. Established in 1945, its headquarters is in Manchester. It was formerly The Co-operative Pharmacy, part of The Co-operative Group until, in 2014, it was sold to the Bestway Group.
- Welsh-Pearson – was a film production and distribution company. Established in 1918, its headquarters was in London.
- Welsh Water – is a non-profit utility company supplying water and treating sewage. Previously it was also an electricity supplier under the name Hyder. Established in 1989, its headquarters is in Nelson, Wales. It was preceded by the Welsh Water Authority. Its parent company is Glas Cymru.
- Welsh National Water Development Authority – was a state owned utility company supplying water and treating sewage. It operated from 1973 to 1989. It was later known as the Welsh Water Authority. It was succeeded by Welsh Water.
- Welwyn Studios – was a film studio company operating from 1928 to 1950. It was located in Welwyn Garden City, Hertfordshire.
- Wessex Trains – was a train operating company owned by National Express that worked the Wessex Trains franchise from October 2001 to March 2006. It ran the majority of local services in South West England as well as some services in South East England, South Wales and including some Alphaline services. In 2001, in a franchise reorganisation, the Welsh services of Wales & West were transferred to Wales and Borders while services mainly focused on South West England remained with Wales & West which changed its trading name to Wessex Trains in October 2001. As part of another franchise reorganisation, the Strategic Rail Authority combined the Great Western, Thames Trains and Wessex Trains franchises to form the Greater Western franchise. The new franchise was won by FirstGroup with the services ran by Wessex Trains transferred to Great Western Railway on 1 April 2006.
- Wessex Water – is a utility company supplying water and treating sewage. Established in 1973, its headquarters is in Bath, Somerset. It was formerly known as the Wessex Water Authority. Its parent company is YTL Corporation.
- West Anglia Great Northern (WAGN) – was a train operating company that worked the West Anglia Great Northern franchise between January 1997 and March 2004 as well as the Great Northern franchise between April 2004 and March 2006. It was owned by Prism Rail until 2000 when it was acquired by National Express as part of its acquisition of Prism Rail. In 2004, the franchise was divided with the West Anglia section merged into the Greater Anglia franchise which was awarded to One (later renamed National Express East Anglia). WAGN continued to operate the remaining Great Northern services until March 2006 when the services were merged into the Thameslink franchise which was awarded to FirstGroup to run First Capital Connect.
- Westbourne Communications – is a public relations company.
- West Bromwich Building Society (trading as 'the West Brom') – is a building society offering mortgages, savings, banking, investments, and insurance. It is headquartered in West Bromwich, West Midlands. It was founded in 1849 as the West Bromwich Permanent Building Society.
- Westbury – was a house building company headquartered in Cheltenham, Gloucestershire. It was founded by the Joiner family in 1964. It was floated on the London Stock Exchange in 1986. Its acquisitions included Clarke Homes, Maunders, and Prowting. It diversified into prefabricated housing, and financial services. In 2005 it was acquired by Persimmon.
- Western Power Distribution – was an energy company providing electricity distribution. Established in 1999, its headquarters was in Bristol. It was composed of 3 companies – WPD South West, WPD South Wales, and WPD Midlands. In 2022 its was absorbed into National Grid.
- Westfield Sportscars – is a sports car manufacturing company. Established in 1982, its headquarters is in Kingswinford, West Midlands.
- West Middlesex Waterworks Company – was a utility company supplying water from 1806 to 1903. Headquartered in London, it became part of the Metropolitan Water Board.
- Wetherspoons – is the trading name of J.D. Wetherspoon plc which operates a chain of pubs, bars, and hotels.
- Whitbread – is a multinational hotel and restaurant company. It was formerly a brewery company and owner of an estate of licensed public houses. Established in 1742, its headquarters is in Houghton Regis, Bedfordshire. It was formerly known as the Hind Brewery. In 2023 its revenue was £2.6 billion, with a net income of £278 million.
- Whitby Seafoods – is a food company that produces frozen seafood. It is headquartered in Whitby, North Yorkshire. It was founded in 1985 when Graham Whittle bought the defunct Whitby Shellfish Company.
- White Stuff – is a company that produces women's, men's, and children's clothing, accessories, homeware and gifts. It operates a clothing stores chain, a retail website, and mail order catalogues. It was founded in 1985 by George Treves and Sean Thomas as 'Boys from the White Stuff', white stuff referring to snow.
- WHSmith – is a retail company that operates a chain of shops selling books, stationery, magazines, newspapers, entertainment products, and confectionery. It is headquartered in Swindon, Wiltshire. It was founded in 1792 by Henry Walton Smith and his wife Anna as a news vendor in London. Former operationas include a library service, travel agents, do-it-yourself, book publishing, music retail shops, toy shops, and television broadcasting. In 2022 its revenue was £1.4 billion, with a net income of £53 million.
- Whyte & Mackay – is a producer of Scotch whiskies, liquors, and vodkas, headquartered in Glasgow, Scotland. It was established in 1882 by Charles Mackay and James Whyte. It has a US subsidiary named Whyte & Mackay Americas. Since 2014 it is owned by Alliance Global Group.
- Wickes – is a home improvement and garden supplies retail chain company catering to domestic consumers and the building trade. It is headquartered in Watford, Hertfordshire. It was founded in 1854 by Henry Dunn Wickes in Michigan, US. In 1972 the Wickes Corporation in partnership with builders merchant Sankeys opened the first Wickes store in the UK, which was expanded into a retail chain. In 2000 it was acquired by Focus Do It All who sold it to Travis Perkins in 2004. In 2021 it was demerged and spun off by Travis Perkins, and floated on the London Stock Exchange as Wickes Group plc.
- Wigan Coal and Iron Company – was a coal mining, and iron works company. Established in 1865, it has become defunct.
- Wilko – was a retail store chain company that sold homewares and household goods. It was headquartered in Worksop, Nottinghamshire. It was founded in 1930 by James Kemsey Wilkinson in Leicester as Wilkinson. In 2012 it was rebranded as Wilko. In 2023 it was put into administration and became defunct. The brand name was acquired by The Range.
- William Grant & Sons – is an alcoholic drinks company producing Scotch whisky and other spirits that is headquartered in Bellshill, Scotland. It was established in 1887 by William Grant and is run by his descendants. Its brands include Glenfiddich, Monkey Shoulder, Hendrick's Gin, Drambuie, Grant's, Balvenie, Three Barrels, Gibson's Finest, Tullamore Dew, and Reyka. It also owns a 30% stake in Highland Distillers.
- William Hill – is a gambling company. Established in 1934, its headquarters is in London. In 2019 its revenue was £1.58 billion, with net income of £27 million.
- William Leech – was a house building company headquartered in Tyneside. It was founded in 1934 by William Leech. In 1985 it was acquired by Beazer.
- Williams & Glyn's Bank – was a financial services company providing banking and insurance. It operated from 1970 to 1985. Headquartered in London, it was formed by the merger of Williams Deacon's Bank with Glyn, Mills & Company Its parent company was the National and Commercial Banking Group, which was later renamed Royal Bank of Scotland Group (now NatWest Group).
- Willmott Dixon – is a construction company active in contracting, residential development, interior fit-out and refurbishment, and property support services. It is headquartered in Letchworth, Hertfordshire. It was founded in 1852 by John Willmott and since 2005 is led by Rick Willmott, the fifth generation of the family. In 2021 its revenue was £1.1 billion, with a net income of £11 million.
- Wilson Bowden – was a house building and general construction company. It was headquartered in Coalville, Leicestershire. It was founded in 1961 by David Wilson and was substantially expanded in the 1980s and 1990s. In 1987 it was floated on the London Stock Exchange as the holding company for David Wilson Homes, and its commercial property subsidiary Wilson Bowden Properties. Its acquisitions included Trencherwood, and the housing business of Henry Boot. In 2007 Wilson Bowden was acquired by Barratt Developments.
- Windsor Studios – was a film studios company. See Catford Studios.
- Wimbledon and Sutton Railway – was a railway company established in 1910 to build a railway between the two Surrey towns in its name (now south-east London). The line was constructed by the Southern Railway and opened in 1929 and 1930.
- Wimbledon Studios – is a film and television studios company. Formerly known as Merton Studios, it is located in Colliers Wood, London.
- Witan Investment Trust – was an investment trust focused on global equity. It was headquartered in London. It was founded in 1909 to manage the estate of Alexander Henderson, 1st Baron Faringdon. It was floated on the London Stock Exchange in 1924. In 1932 it established Henderson Administration to manage its funds before selling its stake in Henderson in 1997. In 2024 it was merged with Alliance Trust to form Alliance Witan.
- Wolfburn distillery – is a producer of Scotch whisky located in Thurso, Scotland. Founded in 1821, it ceased production in the 1850s before being reopened in 2013.
- Woodfall Film Productions – was a film production company. Established in 1958; its headquarters was in London.
- Woolworths Group – was a company that owned the UK high street general merchandise retail chain 'Woolworths' and other companies such as Entertainment UK and Bertrams Books. It was headquartered in London. It was founded in 1909 in Liverpool as a division of the US F. W. Woolworth Company. In 1982 it was acquired by Paternoster Stores Ltd which would become Kingfisher. In 2001 it was demerged together with Kingfisher's other general merchandise businesses to form 'Woolworths Group' which was floated on the London Stock Exchange in 2003. In 2009 the stores business became defunct. Before closure it had 807 stores. Its brands had included 'Winfield', Ladybird children's clothing, 'WorthIt!' value range, Chad Valley toys, 'pick n' mix' sweets, and Embassy Records. A Woolworths.co.uk internet retailer operated from 2009 to 2015.
- Working Title Films – is a British film and television production company that is a subsidiary of NBCUniversal, which is itself a division of Comcast. Established in 1984, its headquarters is in London. Its subsidiaries are: WT2 Productions (film production); and WTTV (TV productions).
- Workspace Group – is a real estate investment trust that lets office, industrial, and workshops space to small and medium-sized enterprises. It is headquartered in London. It was founded in 1987 as London Industrial to dispose of the commercial property of the defunct Greater London Council. In 1997 it was renamed Workspace Group plc. It was converted to a real estate investment trust in 2007. In 2022 its revenue was £132 million, with a net income of £123 million.
- World of Books (trading as Wob) – is an online retail and recycling company offering second-hand books, CDs, DVDs, Blu-rays, and video games. It purchases these in bulk from charity shops and from its websites Ziffit, and Shopiago which also offers e-commerce services. Eighty percent of the books purchased are recycled. It is headquartered in Goring-by-Sea, West Sussex. It was founded in the 2000s by Simon Downes, Ben Maxfield, and Michael Laundon. In 2016 it was acquired by a fund of Bridges Fund Management who sold a majority stake to Livingbridge in 2021. That year it was rebranded Wob.
- Worldwide Healthcare Trust — is an investment trust that invests in biotechnology, and healthcare companies. Headquartered in London, it was established in 1995. It was previously known as Finsbury Worldwide Pharmaceutical.
- World Wide Pictures (UK) – is a film, television, and multimedia production company. Established in 1935, its headquarters is in London.
- WPP – is a communications, advertising, and public relations company. Established in 1971, its headquarters is in London. In 2019 its revenue was £13.2 billion, with net income of £707 million.
- WRc – is a research consultancy company (water, waste and the environment). Established in 1927 it was formerly known as the Water Pollution Research Board (WPRB), the Water Pollution Research Laboratory (WPRL), and the Water Research Centre.
- Wren Kitchens – is a company that designs, manufactures, and sells fitted kitchens, and fitted bedrooms through a retail store chain, and retail website. It is headquartered in Barton-upon-Humber, Lincolnshire. It was founded in 2009.
- Wrexham Water – was a utility company supplying water that operated from 1863 to 1997. It was formerly known as Wrexham Waterworks Company, and as the Wrexham and East Denbighshire Water Company. In 1997 it became part of Dee Valley Water.

== X ==
- Xchanging – is a business and technology services provider to the insurance industry. It is owned by DXC Technology. Established in 1999, its headquarters is in London.
- XP Power – is a designer, manufacturer, and supplier of critical power control systems. Headquartered in Tai Seng, Singapore; it was founded by James Peters in 1988. It had an initial public offering on the London Stock Exchange in 2000. Its acquisitions include: Emco, Comdel, Glassman, FUG Elektronik GmbH, and Guth High Voltage GmbH.
- XPS Pensions – is a financial services company specialising in pensions consulting and administration. It is headquartered in Reading, Berkshire. It began as a pensions business within Equiniti around 1990 that later adopted the brand name Xafin. In 2013 CBPE acquired it and then, in 2017, it had an initial public offering on the London Stock Exchange. In 2018 it acquired Punter Southall & Co. and was renamed XPS Pensions. Its other acquisitions include the corporate pensions business of Royal London Group, and Trigon Professional Services.
- Xtract Resources – is a metals, minerals, and mining company. Established in 2004, its headquarters is in London. It was previously known as Resmex, and as Xtract Energy.

== Y ==
- Yeast Culture – is a film and TV production company. Established in 1999, its headquarters is in Camden, London.
- Yorkshire Building Society – is a building society offering financial services such as mortgages, savings, investments, and insurance. It owns the Chelsea Building Society, the Norwich and Peterborough Building Society, Accord Mortgages, and the savings business of Egg Banking. It is headquartered in Bradford, West Yorkshire. It was founded in 1864 as the Huddersfield Equitable Permanent Benefit Building Society. It expanded through a number of mergers such as with the Bradford Permanent Building Society in 1975 after which it became the Huddersfield & Bradford Building Society. In 1982 it merged with the West Yorkshire Building Society to become the Yorkshire Building Society. It merged with the Haywards Heath Building Society in 1992; the Gainsborough Building Society in 2001; the Barnsley Building Society in 2008; the Chelsea Building Society in 2010; and the Norwich and Peterborough Building Society in 2011.
- Yorkshire Electricity – was an energy company supplying and distributing electricity that operated from 1948 to 1997. Its headquarters was in Leeds, Yorkshire. It was formerly the Yorkshire Electricity Board. In 1997 it was acquired by American Electric Power and Public Service Company of Colorado.
- Yorkshire Water – is a utility company supplying water and disposing of sewage. Established in 1973, its headquarters is in Bradford, Yorkshire. It was formerly known as the Yorkshire Water Authority. Its parent company is the Kelda Group.

== Z ==
- Zeneca – was a British multinational pharmaceutical company specialising in oncology and heart drugs, that operated from 1993 to 1999. Headquartered in London; it was formerly part of Imperial Chemical Industries (ICI). In 1999 it merged with Astra AB to form AstraZeneca.
- Zenith Productions – was a film and TV production company that operated from 1984 to 2005. Later known as Zenith Entertainment; its subsidiary was Blaze Television.
- Zenos Cars – is an automobile manufacturing company producing sports cars. Established in 2012, its headquarters is in Wymondham, Norfolk.
- Zigup – is a commercial vehicle rental provider with over 130,000 vehicles. It also offers fleet management, accident management, repair services, electric charging installation, and vehicle disposal. Headquartered in Darlington, County Durham; it operates in the UK, Ireland, and Spain. It was founded in 1897 as Goode Durrant. In 1987 it acquired Northgate Motor Holdings and, in 1999 was renamed Northgate plc. In 2020 it was merged with Redde plc to form Redde Southgate, and then in 2024 was renamed Zigup. Its acquisitions include: Transport Development Group (TDG) Vehicle Rental, the Spanish vehicle rental company Furgonetas de Alquiler SA, and Arriva's UK vehicle rental business.
- Zipline Creative – was a film, TV, and radio production company. Established in 2008, its headquarters is in Risca, South Wales.
- Zopa – is an online bank offering savings, loans, and credit cards. Headquartered in Tooley Street, London; it was founded in 2005 as a peer-to-peer lending platform. It received a full banking licence in 2020 and ended its peer-to-peer business in 2021.
