= BOU (food company) =

American food company

- Company type: Private
- Industry: Consumer packaged goods (CPG), grocery
- Founded: 2017; 9 years ago
- Founder: Robert Jakobi, Kunal Kohli
- Headquarters: New York, New York
- Area served: United States
- Products: bouillon cubes gravy soup cups
- Number of employees: 10 (2019)
- Website: bouforyou.com

BOU is an American food company that produces bouillon cubes, miso broth cubes, gravy cubes, and instant soup cups. The company was co-founded by Robert Jakobi, former CEO and current board member, and Kunal Kohli, former COO and CEO, and uses artificial-free, non-GMO ingredients in all its products.

== History ==
Former Barclays analyst Robert Jakobi was the managing director and founder of Metcalfe’s Skinny Popcorn, a London-based company that grew under his watch by 200 percent in revenue year-over-year from 2011 to 2014. He and co-founder Julian Metcalfe sold the company to Kettle Chips and it is now owned by Campbell's.

After the sale, Jakobi decided to move to New York City to pursue new entrepreneurial opportunities in the food sector. Together with Kohli and a manufacturer they launched BOU (short for bouillon) in June 2017. The company's mandate was to forgo traditional bouillon ingredients, and instead make healthier cubes.

With a range of products including instant soup cups, cubes for broth, gravy and miso, BOU closed Series B financing in October 2018 for just under $5 million. In 2018, sales for the company were $2 million. BOU products are available in 6,500 United States stores including Whole Foods, Sprouts, Wegmans, Walmart, Foodtown, Harris Teeter, Citarella, Gourmet Garage and Fairway. Its products are also available online at FreshDirect and Amazon.

In September 2020, Kohli was replaced as CEO by former Metcalfe's employee Louise Todd. Jakobi remains on the board.

== Products ==
All BOU products are non-GMO and have no artificial flavors.

There are three flavors of bouillon cubes including vegetable, chicken, and beef. Roasted Garlic was later added.

The BOU Miso soup cubes, launched in September 2018, come as Ginger or Cinnamon & Coconut.

Gravy cubes are available in four flavors: chicken, turkey, brown and mushroom.

Also in September 2018, BOU released a line of instant soup cups in recyclable and microwavable packaging with a transparent lid and spork. The cups were available in Classic Chicken & Noodle Soup, Garden Tomato & Quinoa Soup, Harvest Vegetable & Grain Soup and Shiitake Mushroom & Beef Soup. Garden Tomato & Quinoa was ultimately discontinued. A new flavor, Two Bean Chipotle Chili, was developed in its place.
