= Blackerby =

Blackerby is both a surname and a given name. Notable people with the name include:

- George Blackerby (1903–1987), American baseball player
- Blackerby Fairfax (fl. 1728), English physician
- Peru Italian Blackerby Ping (1842–1890)
