= Vincent Burrough Redstone =

Historian from Suffolk, England

- Born: 1853
- Died: 26 April 1941 (aged 87–88); Woodbridge, Suffolk, England
- Occupations: Schoolmaster and historian
- Known for: Studies in Suffolk History
- Title: Master, Woodbridge School
- Term: 1880–1921
- Spouse: Grace Linsey (died 1911)
- Children: 3 daughters

Vincent Burrough Redstone (1853 – 26 April 1941) was a Suffolk historian who suggested to Edith Pretty that the Sutton Hoo ship burial should be excavated. He was a master of Woodbridge School and secretary of the Suffolk Institute of Archaeology. He retired from Woodbridge School in 1921 and spent the remainder of his life researching historical topics. He was particularly noted for his study of Huguenot settlement in Suffolk.

== Career ==
Redstone's father came from Hampshire and was Master of Alton Workhouse. He died two months after the birth of his son, from Scarlet fever. Redstone had been brought up in an orphanage at Wanstead in Essex and trained to be a teacher at Winchester Training College. He returned to teach at Wanstead. In 1880, Redstone moved to Woodbridge to teach at Woodbridge School and took up the post of General English master and Commercial Subjects. He was later to become Second master. He rapidly became a historian of note studying the archives of the Seckford Trust. He became a Fellow of the Royal Historical Society and the Society of Antiquaries. With his daughters Lilian and Elsie, he was to build up a large body of reference material on Suffolk history at the Seckford Library and in his adjacent house, which was consulted by a wide range of scholars. It was here that Basil Brown was able to glean much of his information on the Saxon archaeology of Suffolk.

=== Meeting with Edith Pretty and the Sutton Hoo excavations ===
At the 1937 Woodbridge Flower Fete, at Woodbridge Abbey, Edith Pretty discussed the possibility of an excavation with Vincent Redstone. Redstone then wrote to his friend Guy Maynard at Ipswich Museum that Mrs Pretty had invited him to lunch and would he accompany him - "Mrs Pretty is very pleasing, intelligent JP’’? The luncheon appears to have taken place on 26 July. Redstone took part in the excavations. In August 1939, he wrote with his daughter Lilian an article in the Woodbridge Reporter asking Was it King Redwald? who was buried at Sutton Hoo.

=== Family ===
Vincent Redstone married Grace Linsey. They lived at 3 Seckford Street, Woodbridge, in the old Woodbridge School Master's house, which was adjacent to the Seckford Library. They had three daughters. Lilian Jane Redstone (1885–1955) was the first archivist for East Suffolk and Elsie became the Seckford Librarian in Woodbridge.

== Publications ==
- Redstone, Vincent Burrough Bygone Woodbridge (1893)
- Redstone, Vincent Burrough Annals of Wickham Market (1896)
- Redstone, Vincent Burrough (ed.) The ship-money returns for the county of Suffolk, 1639–40 (Harl. MSS. 7,540–7,542). (Ipswich: W. E. Harrison, 1904), also by Suffolk Institute of Archaeology and Natural History and Suffolk (England) (page images at HathiTrust)
- Redstone, Vincent Burrough (ed.) Calendar of pre-reformation wills, testaments, probates, administrations: registered at the probate office, Bury St. Edmunds (1907)
- Redstone Vincent Burrough (ed.) Memorials of Old Suffolk Bemrose & Sons, London (1908)
- Redstone, Vincent Burrough The Ancient House or Sparrowe House, Ipswich (1912)
- Redstone, Vincent Burrough Records of Protestant dissenters in Suffolk (Woodbridge: G. Booth, 1912) (page images at HathiTrust; US access only)
- Redstone, Vincent Burrough 'The Dutch and Huguenot Settlements of Ipswich', Proceedings of the Huguenot Society of London, 12 (1921), pp. 183–204. Huguenot Society of London (images at Internet Archive)

== Bibliography ==
- Obituary: Suffolk Institute of Archaeology
- Norman Scarfe (1958) Vincent Burrough Redstone, F.S.A.., F.R. Hist.Soc. 1853–1941: Lilian Jane Restone, M.B.E., B.A. 1885–1955. Redstone Memorial Volume, Suffolk Records Society, Vol. 1. pp. 7–13.
- Weaver M & C (1987) The Seckford Foundation: Four Hundred Years of a Tudor Foundation The Seckford Foundation, Woodbridge. ISBN 0951220306
- Weaver M (1999) In the Beginning.... Saxon The Newsletter of the Sutton Hoo Society, No.30. pp1–2.
