= Shire Hall, Woodbridge =

County building in Woodbridge, Suffolk, England

Shire Hall
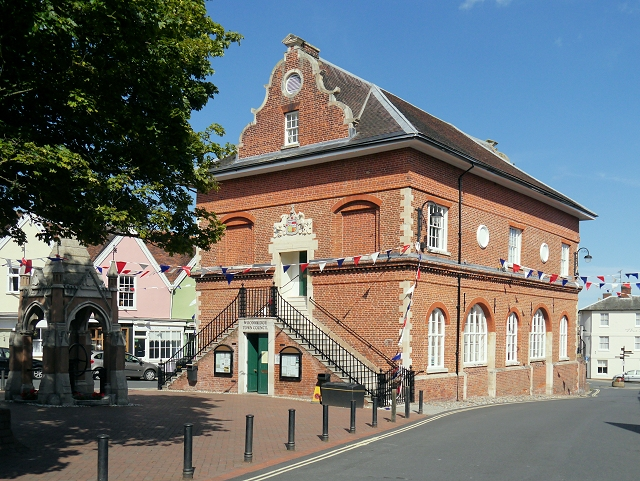
- Shire Hall, Woodbridge

- Shown in Suffolk
- 52.0941°N 1.3136°E
- Location: Market Hill, Woodbridge

History
- Built: c.1575

Site notes
- Architectural style: Neoclassical style

Listed Building – Grade I
- Official name: The Shire Hall and Corn Exchange
- Designated: 25 January 1951
- Reference no.: 1377037

The Shire Hall is a municipal building in Market Hill in Woodbridge, Suffolk, England. The structure, which is the meeting place of Woodbridge Town Council, is a Grade I listed building.

== History ==
From the reign of King Edgar in the 10th century, Woodbridge was the centre of the Wicklaw Region and developed as a county town in its own right with its own shire courts. After the quarter-sessions were removed from Melton, a courtier to Queen Elizabeth I, Thomas Seckford, decided to commission a new sessions house for the Liberty of St Etheldreda. The building was arcaded on the ground floor, so that corn markets could be held, with a courtroom on the first floor which Seckford gave to the county in perpetuity. It was designed in the neoclassical style, built in red brick and was completed in around 1575.

The design provided for access to the courtroom at either end of the building using external stone staircases with wrought iron railings, which led up to first-floor doorways with architraves and carvings of the Seckford coat of arms. At the east end, the doorway was flanked by a pair of niches and surmounted by a gable containing a window and a clock, while at the west end, the doorway was flanked by blind brick panels and surmounted by a gable containing a window and an oculus. The north and south elevations, which had each five openings on the ground floor, were each fenestrated by three sash windows on the first floor.

The appearance of the building was enhanced by the installation of Dutch gables surmounted by small pediments at either end of the building in the 17th century, and by the infilling of the openings on the ground floor in the early 19th century. Meanwhile, the west end of the market hall was leased for use as a fire station in 1817. A village pump, with Doric order turrets and a pyramid-shaped roof, was paid for by the Seckford Foundation and installed outside the west end of the building in 1877.

After the courts service recommended the closure of the magistrates' court in Woodbridge in 1985, the building was acquired by Woodbridge Town Council in 1987 and it subsequently became the meeting place of the town council. The room on the first floor was leased out to the Seckford Foundation, a charity formed to support young and elderly people in the town. A statue of a little drummer boy, which had been donated to the town by Diana Keppel, Countess of Albemarle shortly after she moved to the town in 1962 and installed outside the local council offices, was relocated to the east end of the shire hall in March 2018.

Works of art in the shire hall include a nautical painting by William Pike entitled The Sylph at Sea.
