= Gas Stripping Tower =

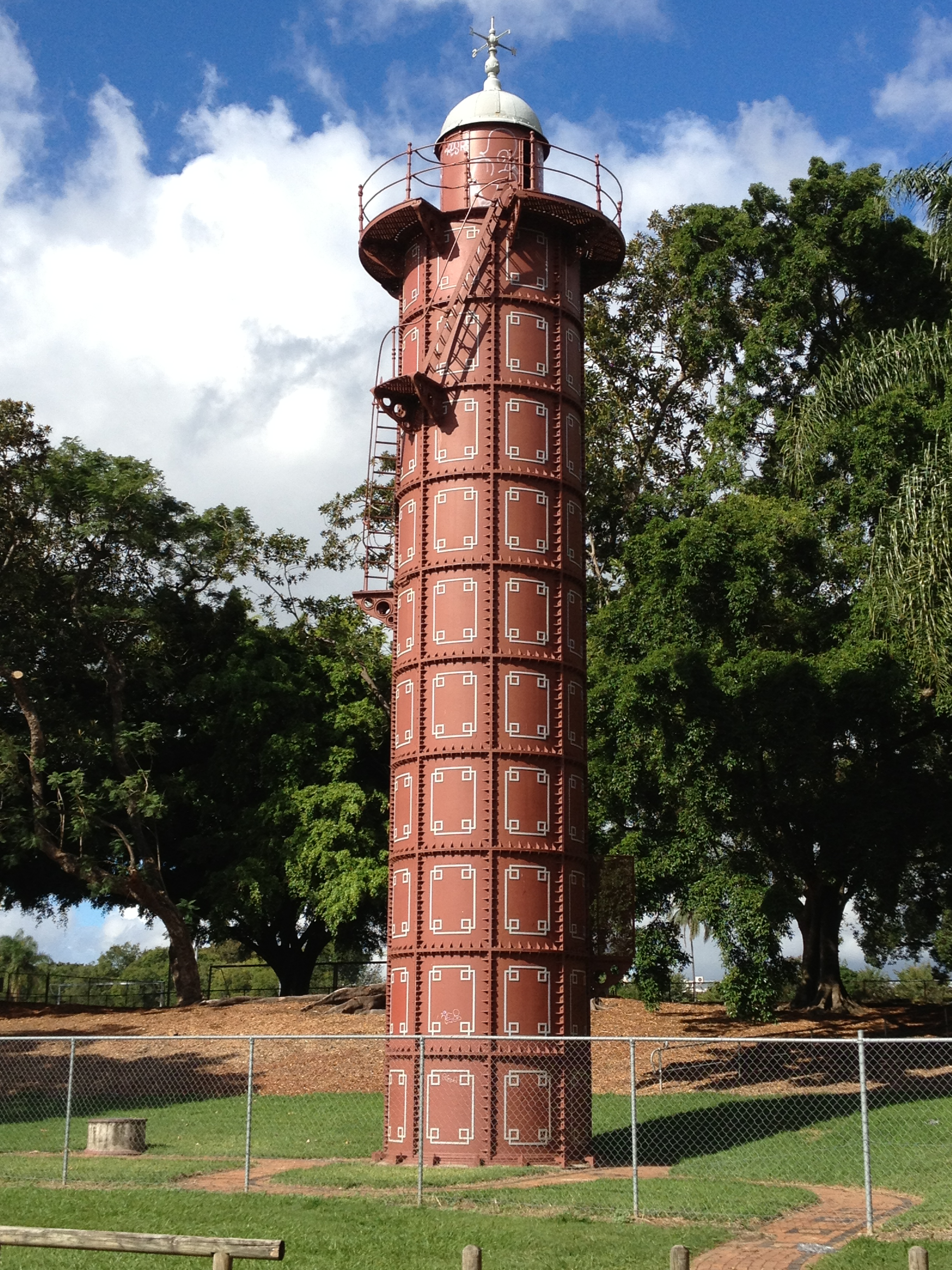
- Gas Stripping Tower, South Brisbane

- Location within Queensland Location within Australia
- 27.4793°S 153.0026°E
- Location: 277 Montague Road, West End, Queensland, Australia

History
- Design period: 1900–1914 (early 20th century)
- Built: 1912
- Built for: South Brisbane Gas & Light Company

Site notes
- Architect: Robert Dempster & Sons Ltd
- Owner: National Trust of Queensland

Queensland Heritage Register
- Official name: Gas Stripping Tower
- Type: state heritage (built)
- Designated: 21 October 1992
- Reference no.: 600342
- Significant period: 1912 (fabric); 1912–c. 1949 (historical)
- Significant components: tank – water, plaque, tower – processing

The Gas Stripping Tower is a heritage-listed tower at 277 Montague Road, West End, Queensland, Australia. It was designed by Robert Dempster & Sons Ltd and built in 1912. It was added to the Queensland Heritage Register on 21 October 1992.

== History ==
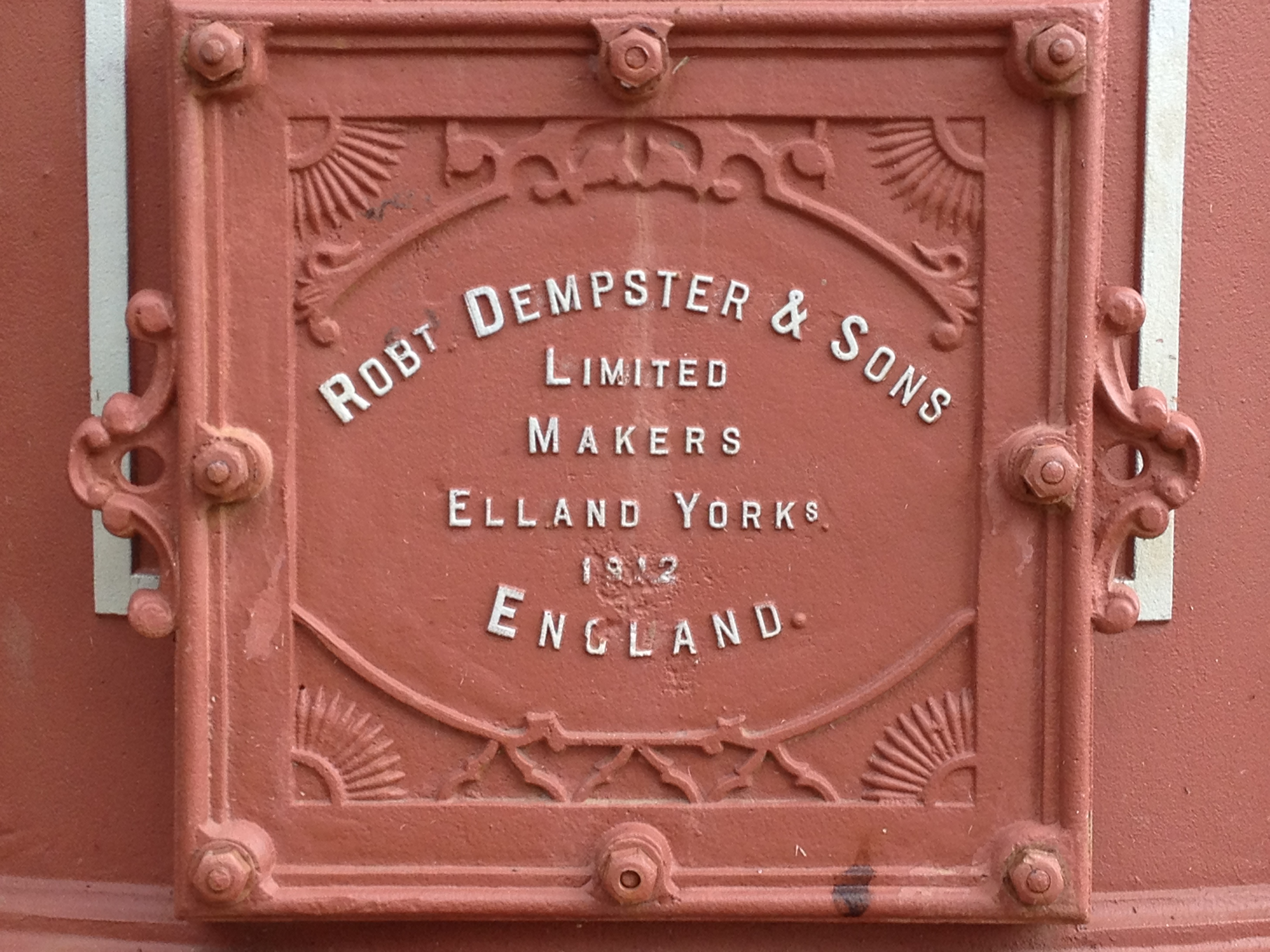
Manufacturers information

This demountable cast iron tower was manufactured in 1912 by Robert Dempster & Sons Ltd, of Elland, Yorkshire, and transported in segments to Brisbane, where it was erected at the West End Gasworks in Montague Road operated by the South Brisbane Gas & Light Company.

The South Brisbane Gas & Light Company was established in 1885, in direct competition to the Brisbane Gas Corporation. Initially the companies supplied gas to both sides of the Brisbane River, but in 1889 agreement was reached whereby the BGC supplied the northside, and the SBGLC to the south of the river.

As a result of growing demand for gas and the need to upgrade their facilities, in 1911 the company sent their principal engineer to Britain to assess the latest in gas production technology. The decision to erect a stripping tower was a result of this visit.

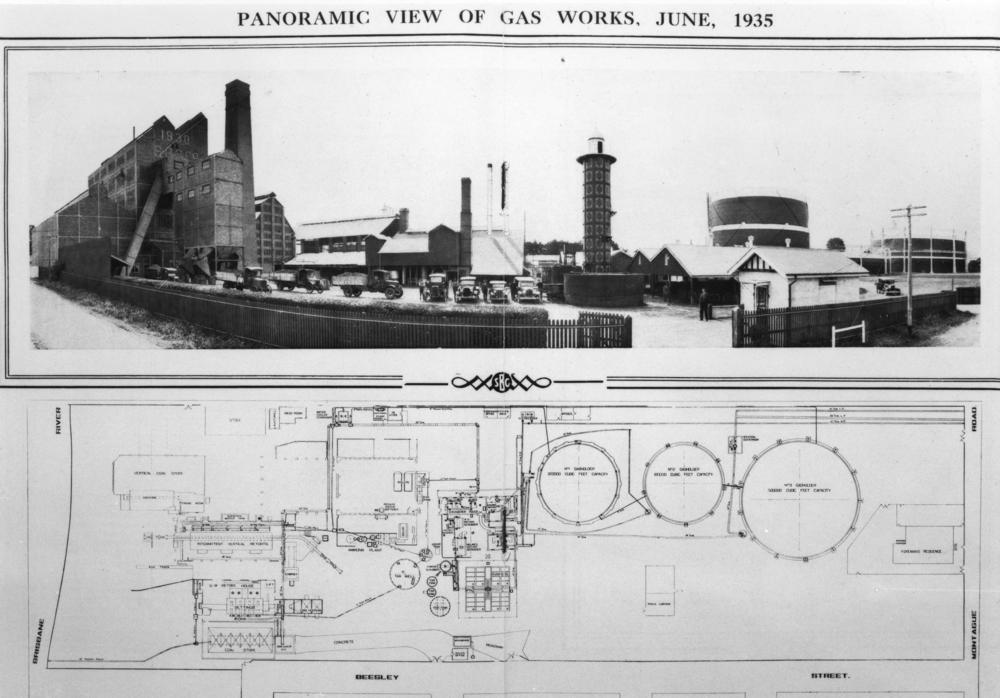
Gas stripping tower in its original context in South Brisbane, 1935

The tower was used in the removal of tar and ammonia from raw coal gas by Gas Stripping. Gas was piped into the base of the tower, from where it rose to the top via a series of internal baffles over which water was sprayed from a header tank at the top of the tower, stripping the gas of coal tar and ammonia in the process. The liquid was drained via a water seal at the bottom, and sold as ammonia liquor.

By 1949 more sophisticated techniques were being employed to remove impurities from gas, and the tower was no longer used. With the availability of natural gas to Brisbane in the 1970s, the company's Montague Road works were made redundant and in 1975 most of the structures on the site were demolished.

In the same year the stripping tower was acquired by the National Trust of Queensland, who dismantled the structure and stored it pending availability of a suitable relocation site. In 1979, it was reassembled in Davies Park, approximately 150 metres (490 ft) from its original position. In 1988, Allgas Energy Ltd (formerly the South Brisbane Gas & Light Company) refurbished the tower and landscaped the surrounding area, as a bicentennial gift to Brisbane.

Although relocated, the tower survives as the only one of its type in Australia.

== Description ==
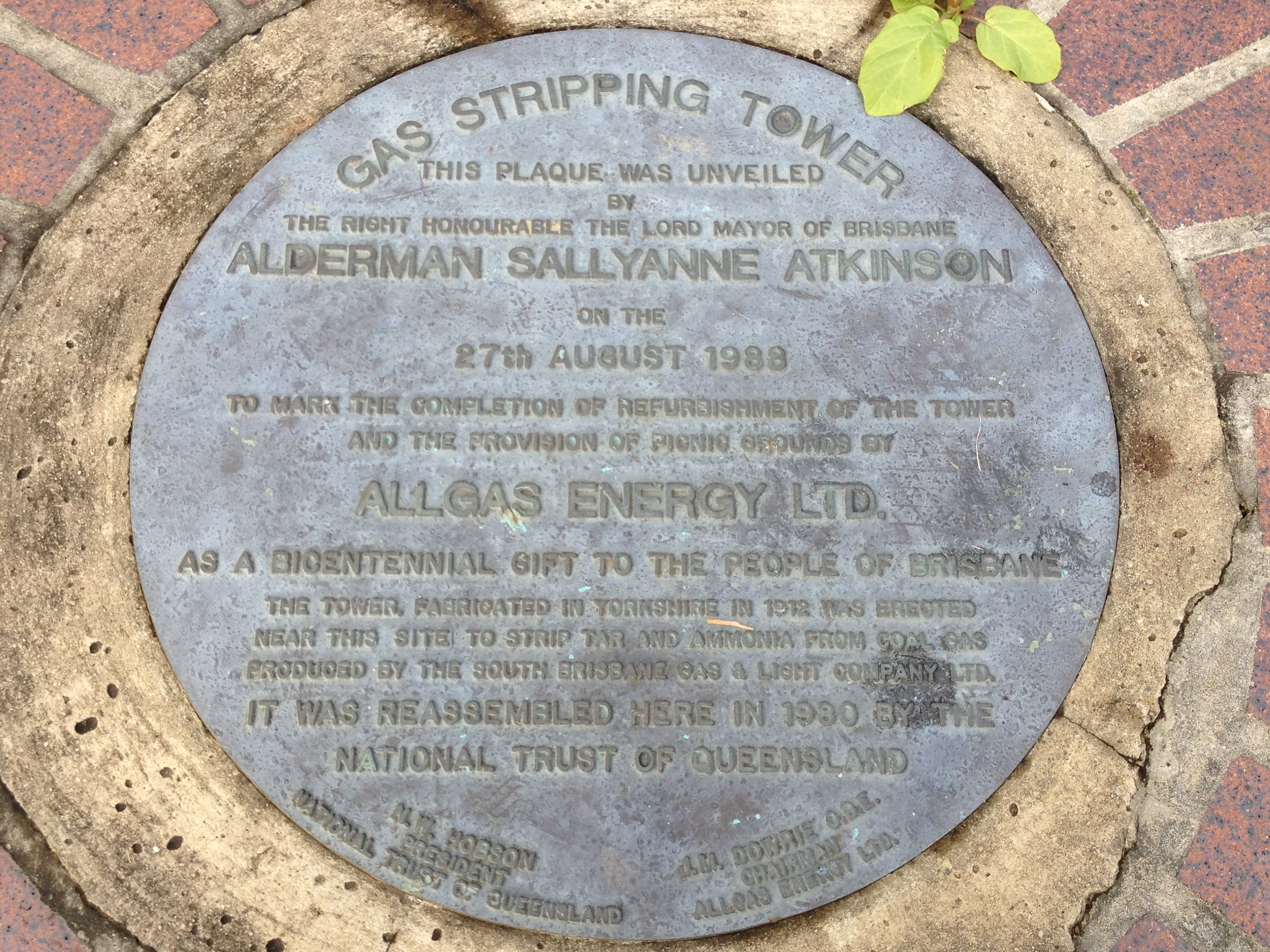
Commemorative plaque

The gas stripping tower is constructed of curved cast components, which fit together to form a slender tower surmounted by a work platform, a water tank disguised as a lantern drum, a cupola and a superimposed weathervane. It stands approximately 21 metres (69 ft) high with a diameter of about 3.5 metres (11 ft). Spare relief work decorates the panels, and an access stair and handrail, braced by decorative cast brackets, accentuates the profile.

The 1988 renovation work involved sand blasting the exterior, repainting it in the original reddish-brown colour with an epoxy finish, and highlighting the relief work in silver. Also the cupola was removed, repaired and painted silver before being replaced on the tower.

The tower is adjacent to Riverside Drive, and is visible from both river banks. Decorative paving and a commemorative plaque, which were 1988 improvements, define the immediate area.

== Heritage listing ==
Gas Stripping Tower was listed on the Queensland Heritage Register on 21 October 1992 having satisfied the following criteria.

The place is important in demonstrating the evolution or pattern of Queensland's history.

Through its association with the South Brisbane Gas and Light Company, the place demonstrates the evolution of Queensland's history, in particular the evolution of the former West End river bank industrial area

The place demonstrates rare, uncommon or endangered aspects of Queensland's cultural heritage.

The place demonstrates rare aspects of Queensland's cultural heritage, being the only surviving gas stripping tower in Australia.

The place is important because of its aesthetic significance.

The place exhibits aesthetic characteristics valued by the community, in particular its contribution to the riverscape along the Milton-Toowong Reach of the Brisbane River
