= Adam Hunt (chess player) =

English chess player (1980–2024)

Personal information
- Born: 24 October 1980 Oxford, England
- Died: 3 December 2024 (aged 44)

Chess career
- Country: England
- Title: International Master (2001)
- Peak rating: 2466 (January 2008)

Adam C. Hunt was an English chess player, author and coach, holding the title of International Master since 2001. He is the younger brother of fellow International Master and Women's Grandmaster Harriet Hunt.

== Early life ==
Hunt attended Cherwell School in Oxford for his secondary education; he went on to achieve a Bachelors' degree in Biology and Management Studies in 2003 with a 2:1 classification.

== Playing career ==
Hunt's playing career on the national stage started at a young age, when he competed in the 1993 British Chess Championship, outscoring his sister by half a point.

In 2001, Hunt received the International Master title. He went on to achieve two of three Grandmaster norms with strong performances at the 4NCL in 2002/2003, and the British Chess Championship in 2010, where he held a draw against Michael Adams in the ninth round and beat Peter Wells in the fourth round; he came third in this event, above many strong players and only being bested by Nicholas Pert and Michael Adams.

He has defeated many strong grandmasters over the course of his career, including Gawain Jones, Simon Williams and Pia Cramling, and in 2012 held a draw against former Women's World Champion Hou Yifan.

== Later life ==
Hunt went on to become an author, commentator and coach. In 2003, he joined Woodbridge School as its Examinations Officer and Head of Chess, where he remained until the end of his life. Under his tenure, the school went on to win the British Chess Education Trust award twice. Also under his tenure, in 2015 Justin Tan achieved the International Master title while a student at the school, and became a Grandmaster in 2018.

In 2013, Hunt published his book Chess Strategy: Move by Move, as part of Everyman Chess. He commentated the British Chess Championship broadcast annually from 2022, regularly appearing on English Chess Federation broadcasts with Daniel Gormally, alongside coaching the Welsh team at the 2022 Olympiad.

In 2020, he was appointed leader of the English Chess Trust's mentoring programme, which helped to develop young players currently on the Trust's Accelerator Programme to represent England internationally in junior events.

On 3 December 2024, his sister announced that Hunt had died after having had cancer for nine years. The livestream of his memorial service was subsequently published on 1 March 2025.
