= Clive Schlee =

British businessman (born 1959)

- Born: Clive Edward Benedict Schlee; March 1959 (age 67); London, England
- Education: Rugby School
- Alma mater: University College, Oxford
- Spouse: Married
- Children: 3

Clive Edward Benedict Schlee (born March 1959) is a British businessman, and was CEO of the UK fast food chain Pret a Manger from 2003 to 2019. He is connected to several companies, including Itsu, Action Rock, and Shire Cape.

He is presently the Chairman of the Governors of Woodbridge School and the Seckford Foundation.

== Early life ==
Schlee was born in March 1959 in London, and brought up there and in Suffolk. He was educated at Rugby School and received a First in history from University College, Oxford.

== Career ==
Schlee started his career in 1980 with Jardine Matheson, and spent 17 years there, rising to lead their worldwide restaurant businesses from Hong Kong, before joining Pret in 1997 as managing director, retiring from his role as CEO in 2019. He is also a director and 50% owner of the sushi chain Itsu.

== Personal life ==
Schlee is married with three children.
