= Woodbridge School =

Coordinates: 52°5′47″N 1°18′36″E

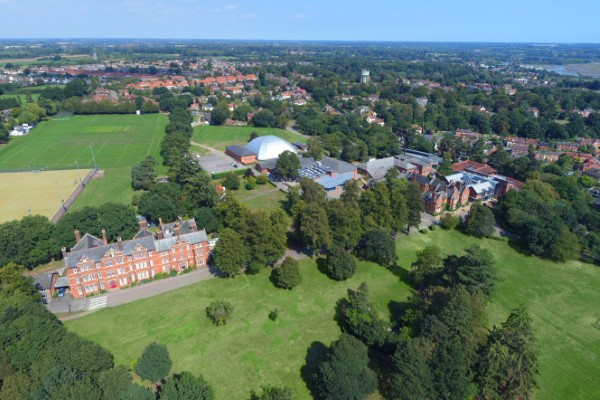
- School House and main buildings

Location
- Burkitt Road; Woodbridge, Suffolk, IP12 4JH; England

Information
- Type: Private day and boarding school
- Motto: Pro Deo Rege Patria ("For God, king and country")
- Religious affiliation: Church of England
- Established: 1577; 449 years ago
- Local authority: Suffolk
- Department for Education URN: 124887 Tables
- Chair: Clive Schlee
- Head: Shona Norman
- Gender: Coeducational
- Age: 4 to 18
- Enrolment: 745
- Houses: Day: Annott, Burwell, Seckford & Willard; Boarding: School
- Colours: Blue, red
- Former pupils: Old Woodbridgians (OWs)
- Website: woodbridgeschool.org.uk

Woodbridge School is a private day and boarding school in Woodbridge, Suffolk, England, founded in 1577, for the poor of Woodbridge. It was later supported by the Seckford Foundation. It has been co-educational since September 1974.

== History ==
The school was founded in 1577 but, like many others, lapsed during the English Civil War. It was re-established in 1662.

The Free School, Woodbridge, was an expression of the new confidence in England following the restoration of the monarchy in 1660. Local citizens contributed to the founding of the school in 1662, appointing a schoolmaster on an annual salary of £25 to teach, without charge, ten "sons of the meaner sort of the inhabitants of the town". Additional pupils paid an annual fee of £1.

After a difficult start, including the ravages of the plague in 1666, the school flourished in the eighteenth century. By the mid-nineteenth century, the cramped School building was proving inadequate and in 1861 the school integrated with the Seckford Trust, an almshouse charity, becoming a part beneficiary of an endowment left to the town of Woodbridge in 1587 by Thomas Seckford, Master of the Court of Requests to Queen Elizabeth I.

In 1864 the school moved from the centre of town on the site of the former Augustinian house of Woodbridge Priory to its present site with 45 acres (180,000 m^{2}) of wooded grounds overlooking Woodbridge. At this time formally titled "Seckford Grammar School", the school became more commonly known as "The Woodbridge Grammar School" and then, from around 1895, simply "Woodbridge School". It joined the Headmasters' and Headmistresses' Conference (HMC) in 1907.

From 1945 the school was a direct grant grammar school, opting to return to full independent status in 1976 when the scheme was phased out.

== The school ==
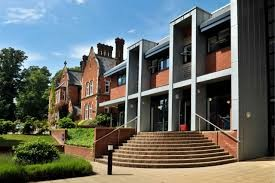
Marryott House and sixth form centre

The senior school is a co-educational day school with a boarding component for Years 7 to 13. It offers GCSE, IGCSE and AS/A Level examinations. The day pupil body is divided into four houses, Annott, Burwell, Seckford and Willard. There is a boarding house, known as School House, which provides a home to mainly international students. The school's music activities include a symphony orchestra, chamber orchestra and choral society as well as smaller ensembles. There is a professional theatre, the Seckford Theatre.

There is a separate junior school, Woodbridge Prep School (formerly "The Abbey School"), for Years 3 to 6, housed in Thomas Seckford's mansion in the centre of the town. The site also now hosts Woodbridge Pre-Prep School (formerly "Queen's House") for Reception and Years 1 and 2.

== Sport ==
The school has sports facilities including a heated sports dome, a gym, an astroturf, netball courts, tennis courts, a rifle range and playing fields for athletics, rugby, football, hockey and cricket.

Other sports include sailing (which takes place at Alton Water), riding, basketball, fencing, badminton, golf, rowing, swimming, tennis, shooting, skiing and windsurfing.

== Seckford scheme ==
From Year 9 onwards, on a Friday afternoon, students can join the Combined Cadet Force (CCF), (Army, Royal Navy or Royal Air Force sections) or the Duke of Edinburgh’s Award scheme (or both); or participate in sports, arts, music and other activities.

== Chess ==
Woodbridge is the leading school in the East of England for chess and is recognised as an English Chess Federation (ECF) centre of excellence. It employs an International Master, Dagne Ciuksyte, as a full-time chess teacher.

== Notable Old Woodbridgians ==
- Malcolm Bowie – academic and Master of Christ's College, Cambridge
- Adam Buddle – botanist
- David Canzini – political agent and advisor
- Sophie Cookson – actress
- Simon Dring – British foreign correspondent
- Edward du Cann – former Chairman of the Conservative Party and 1922 Committee
- Blackerby Fairfax – physician
- Roderick Flower – pharmacologist
- Robert Franklin – nonconformist minister
- Nick Griffin – former MEP and leader of British National Party
- Jack Laskey – actor
- Francis Light – founder of the British colony of Penang
- Desmond Longe – SOE agent and inspiration for James Bond, 007
- Nick Lowe – rock musician and producer
- Campbell MacKenzie-Richards – early aviator and test pilot
- Messenger Monsey – physician and humourist
- Frank Morley – mathematician
- Jessica Oyelowo – actress
- Jenny Riddell-Carpenter – Labour MP
- Luke Roberts – actor
- Camilla Rutherford – actress and model
- Brinsley Schwarz – rock musician
- Frank Ormond Soden – First World War pilot
- Colin Stannard – Archdeacon of Carlisle
- John Stuck – cricketer
- Isabella Summers – keyboardist of Florence and the Machine
- Justin Tan – chess grandmaster
- Andrew Taylor – crime novelist
- Sir John Vigers Worthington – politician
- Simon Wigg – speedway rider and five times world 'longtack' champion
- Morgan Williams (1878–1970), member of the New Zealand House of Representatives
- William Wood, 1st Baron Hatherley – Liberal Lord Chancellor
- Andrew Wolff – rugby sevens player

== Notable staff ==
- William Balgarnie – inspiration for the character Mr Chips
- Adam Hunt – International Master
- Richard Pineo – cricketer
- Vincent Redstone – Second master and Suffolk historian, who suggested to Edith Pretty that the Sutton Hoo ship burial should be excavated
- Louise Rickard – rugby player
- Mariette Rix – hockey player
- Michael Troughton – actor

== Literature ==
- Weaver M & C (1987) The Seckford Foundation : Four Hundred Years of a Tudor Foundation The Seckford Foundation, Woodbridge. ISBN 0951220306
