= Nathaniel Fairfax =

English divine and physician

Nathaniel Fairfax (1637–1690) was an English divine and physician.

== Life ==
Fairfax was born on 24 July 1637, the third and youngest son of Benjamin Fairfax, the ejected incumbent of Rumburgh, Suffolk, by his wife Sarah, daughter of Roger and Joane Galliard. The family claimed kindred with the Fairfaxes of Yorkshire. Nathaniel was educated at Corpus Christi College, Cambridge, as a member of which he proceeded M.A. in 1661. During the Commonwealth he was presented to the perpetual curacy of Willisham, Suffolk, whence he was ejected in 1662 for refusing to conform. He then turned his attention to physic as a means of livelihood, and took the degree of M.D. at Leyden in 1670, on which occasion he published his inaugural dissertation De Lumbricis.

He removed to England and practised at Woodbridge, Suffolk. There he wrote A Treatise of the Bulk and Selvedge of the World. Wherein the Greatness, Littleness, and Lastingness of Bodies are Freely Handled. With an Answer to Tentamine [sic: Tentamina] de Deo, by S[amuel] P[arker] D.D. (1674), which is curious for the affected exclusion of all words borrowed from the learned languages. Although he was never a fellow, Fairfax contributed some papers to the Philosophical Transactions of the Royal Society, among them one giving "instances of peculiarities of nature both in men and brutes".

He died on 12 June 1690 and was buried at Woodbridge. He was twice married. By his first wife, Elizabeth Blackerby, he had four sons and four daughters, of whom one son, Blackerby Fairfax, and three daughters only, survived him.
