= Metcalfes Skinny =

Healthy snack food business

Metcalfe's Skinny is a healthy snack food business set up in 2009 by Julian Metcalfe and, since September 2016, fully owned by the owner of Kettle Foods, Snyder's-Lance.

== History ==
Metcalfe's Skinny Popcorn was set up in 2009 by Matthew Ziff and Julian Metcalfe, the founder of Itsu and Pret a Manger, as part of an overall Metcalfe's Food company business which also produced a number of grocery and snack items for Itsu.

In June 2015, the larger group was split into separate businesses, with Metcalfe's Skinny becoming a business in its own right and the Itsu Grocery brand becoming a subsidiary of the main Itsu brand.

In January 2016, Kettle Chips bought a 26% stake in the business, with Kettle Chips. owner Snyder's-Lance purchasing the remaining 74% stake in September 2016, leading to Metcalfe leaving the business.

In November 2016, a new pack design was launched and references to Metcalfe and Pret were removed from both the new packaging and the website.

== Products ==
The company offers a number of corn based healthy snack products under the Metcalfe's Skinny brand, which include:

- Popcorn Bags (cinema sweet, sinnamon sweet, maple bacon, sea salt, sweet and salt)
- Rice Cakes (milk chocolate, dark chocolate, yoghurt)
- Popcorn Crisps (sweet chilli, say cheese, original)
- Popcorn Thins (milk chocolate, dark chocolate)
- Corncakes (milk chocolate, dark chocolate)
