= John Stuck =

English cricketer

Personal information
- Full name: John Peter Stuck
- Born: 19 November 1943 (age 82); Ipswich, Suffolk
- Batting: Left-handed
- Role: Batsman and wicket-keeper

Domestic team information
- Years: Team
- 1969–1979: Suffolk County Cricket Club

John Peter Stuck (born 19 November 1943) is an English cricketer who is reported to have scored over 100,000 runs, including more than 200 centuries. He played minor counties cricket for Suffolk, and later in life he represented England at veterans age group level. He is a left-handed batsman and wicket-keeper.

Stuck was born in Ipswich and played junior cricket for the local clubs in Bures and Sudbury. He attended the local grammar school before moving to Woodbridge School as a boarder. Through the school staff, he obtained a job on the groundstaff at Lord's.

In 1963, Stuck moved to Clacton-on-Sea where he joined Clacton Cricket Club. He scored over 43,000 runs for Clacton, making 73 centuries for the first XI. Between 1969 and 1979 he was selected to represent Suffolk in the Minor Counties Championship, making just one century. He also made a single List A appearance for Suffolk, in the 1978 Gillette Cup, against Sussex.

Stuck continued to play cricket after reaching the age of 50, representing Suffolk over-50s, Essex over-60s and over-70s, and England veterans. In 2005, he scored a century while playing for England in the over-70s Ashes against Australia in Brisbane; he retired hurt with cramp, but returned to keep wicket during the Australia innings. He has also umpired in the East Anglian Premier League. He retired from playing in 2000 and 2019, though later returned both times.

Stuck also played badminton to a high standard, representing England over-60s at the 2004 European Championships.
