= Robert Jakobi =

Food entrepreneur

- Education: University of Pennsylvania (A.B.) Duke University
- Occupation: Entrepreneur

Robert Jakobi is an entrepreneur. He is the former managing director and co-owner of Metcalfe's Food Company, which was founded by Julian Metcalfe in 2009.

== Early life and education ==
Robert Jakobi grew up in London, England. He moved to the US to study. Jakobi attended Duke University, and then the University of Pennsylvania, where he graduated in May 2007.

== Career ==
=== Barclays Capital ===
Jakobi started his career as an analyst in investment banking at Barclays Capital in New York.

=== Pod bites ===
In January 2010, while working in finance, Jakobi founded a food company called Pod bites, which was a range of chocolate and yoghurt-covered edamame. He launched Pod bites in Harvey Nichols and Selfridges amongst others in March 2010.

=== Metcalfe’s Food Company ===
Through Pod bites, Jakobi met Julian Metcalfe, who is the co-founder of Itsu and Pret A Manger. Jakobi approached Metcalfe as he was keen to get Pod bites into Itsu and Pret A Manger Jakobi became the managing director of Metcalfe's Food Company in October 2010.

Metcalfe's Food Company enjoyed a compound annual growth rate of over 200% in revenues between 2011 and 2014. In February 2014 the company had forecast to achieve £50 Million in sales within the next 3 years. As of December 2014, Metcalfe's Food Company were the fastest-growing, privately-owned food and drink company in the UK.

=== Metcalfe’s skinny ===
In January 2016 Diamond Foods acquired a minority stake in Metcalfe's skinny. In September 2016 the new owner of Kettle Foods Snyder's-Lance, Inc. acquired the remainder of the business.

=== BOU ===
In April 2017 Jakobi launched BOU, a range of better-for-you bouillon cubes into the US market. AccelFoods, an investment fund focused on food and beverage startups, are the lead investor.

=== Misfits Health ===
In August 2021 Jakobi led the Series A round of Misfits, a UK plant-based nutrition brand with a £3 million investment. Misfits were ranked the 99th fastest-growing business in Europe in the 2022 Financial Times 1000 list.

=== Webloom ===
In March 2022 Jakobi launched Webloom, a growth equity HoldCo to acquire emerging consumer brands. Webloom intended acquire UK companies to accelerate their growth in the US.

=== E1 Team Miami ===
In December 2023 Jakobi launched Team Miami with global entertainment icon Marc Anthony in the world’s first all-electric powerboat championship called the E1 Series. The series is raising awareness around sustainability and includes other teams from celebrities such as Tom Brady, Rafael Nadal, and Will Smith. In July 2024 Team Miami announced a partnership with Azimut Yachts.

== Accolades ==
In December 2013, Metcalfe's Food Company were featured as one of ten ‘Ones to Watch’ in the Sunday Times Fast Track 100. The Fast Track 100 ranks the fastest growing privately owned companies in the UK.

In April 2014, Jakobi and Metcalfe were named as London & South finalists for the 2014 Ernst & Young Entrepreneur of the Year Award.

In May 2014, Metcalfe's Food Company was announced as one of the winners of The Santander Breakthrough 50 Awards.

In July 2014, Robert was selected as one of 30 Young Guns. Young Guns celebrates the best 30 entrepreneurs aged 35 or under in the UK.

In December 2014, Metcalfe's Food Company were ranked at number 4 in the Sunday Times Fast Track 100.

In January 2015, Robert was selected on the Forbes 30 Under 30 in Food & Wine.

== Appearances ==
=== One Young World ===
On 16 October 2014, Robert was invited by One Young World as a special delegate to head a panel on successful young entrepreneurs at their annual summit in Dublin. The panel was chaired by Barclays CEO Anthony Jenkins and also included Hailo's Jay Bregman, made.com's Julien Callede, One Fine Stay's founder Tim Davey and YouTube celebrity Michelle Phan. The summit brings together young people to debate issues of global concern.

Jakobi explained that the panel was to have a particular focus on the importance of inspiring youth entrepreneurship in an interview he did with Bloomberg prior to the summit.
