= Metcalfe's Food Company =

British food company

- Company type: Private
- Industry: Retail
- Founded: 2010
- Headquarters: London, England
- Products: Snack foods

Metcalfe's Food Company was a privately owned food business founded in 2009 by Julian Metcalfe, the founder of the sandwich chain, Pret A Manger, and Robert Jakobi. Metcalfe's Food Company sold products under two brands Metcalfes Skinny and Itsu Grocery.

== History ==
Julian Metcalfe founded Metcalfe's Food in 2009 as a way to sell popcorn and healthier food snacks to food service outlets. A year later Robert Jakobi joined the company as managing director.

Robert Jakobi introduced chocolate covered edamame to the United Kingdom market in 2010 and sold them initially under his own ‘Pod bites’. He sought a bigger platform for the product and merged ‘Pod bites’ into Metcalfe's Food Company and become the managing director in October 2010.

In 2015, the company split into two brands. 'Itsu grocery' became a part of the Itsu business and Metcalfes Skinny became a standalone business.

Kettle Foods acquired a 26% interest in Metcalfe's Skinny in January 2016 and in October of that same year purchased the remaining 74%.

== Recognition ==
In December 2013, Metcalfe's Food Company were featured as one of ten ‘Ones to Watch’ in the Sunday Times Fast Track 100. The Fast Track 100 ranks the fastest-growing privately owned companies in the UK.

In April 2014, Robert Jakobi along with Julian Metcalfe were named as London & South finalists for the 2014 Ernst & Young Entrepreneur of the Year Award.

In May 2014, Metcalfe's Food Company was announced as one of the winners of The Santander Breakthrough 50 Awards. The awards celebrate the UK's top 50 most exciting fast-growth companies.

In December 2014, Metcalfe's Food Company was ranked at number 4 in the Sunday Times Fast Track 100.
