= Jolly's (department store) =

British department store

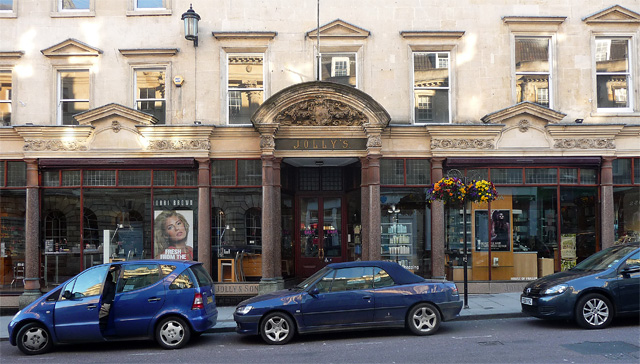
- Exterior of the Jolly's flagship store at 7-14 Milsom Street in Bath (2012)
- Industry: Retail
- Genre: Department stores
- Founded: 1823; 203 years ago
- Founders: James Jolly
- Headquarters: Bath, United Kingdom
- Number of employees: ~100 (2025)
- Parent: Dingles (1970–1971); House of Fraser (1971–2025); Morleys Stores (2025–present)
- Website: jollysbath.co.uk

Jolly's is a British luxury department store founded in 1823, the store is located on Milsom Street in the Milsom Quarter of Bath. Under the control of House of Fraser from 1971 until its February 2025 closure, in March 2025 it was announced that Jolly's had been sold to Morleys Stores and will reopen in March 2027.

== Early history ==
James Jolly set up a linen drapery store in Deal, Kent during the 1810s. The business thrived, and by 1823 he opened a seasonal store in Bath for his son Thomas. The shop was a success and by 1830 became a permanent shop. The business quickly expanded and by 1852 Jolly & Son had branches in Deal, Margate, Bath, Bristol. The business sold amongst others linen, toys, silk and cutlery. However, in 1889, the Bristol store was sold off. In addition to the shops, Jollys had an extensive mail order business.

In 1903, Jolly and Son was sold to a new private limited company called Jolly & Son Ltd. The main shareholders in the new company were still the Jolly family. By 1905, they had outgrown their Bath store and so moved started a rebuilding programme of the Milsom Street site. Although building work continued in 1906 the business saw sales grow to £83,050. The business still kept growing and by 1912 it had purchased 9 Milsom Street and the stock of T Knight & Son.

== 1918 onwards, Frasers ownership and closure ==
During the First World War, business struggled so special train excursions were started, and with the visit of Queen Mary while she was at Badminton, saw the profits increase which was enough for the business to purchase the Milsom street site outright.

In 1922 the company re-purchased the Bristol store that it had sold in 1889, which was financed by the company being floated in 1923. A small furniture store was opened in Cardiff also in this year. By 1924 the turnover of the chain amounted to £264,000. However, by the late 1920s and 30s the business struggled during the depression, and only minor alterations were made to the Bristol and Bath stores.

During the Second World War, the Bristol store was completely destroyed by Enemy bombing and smaller premises on Whiteladies Road was used, and eventually purchased as the stores permanent home.

In the 1961, the Bristol store was enlarged by the purchase of an adjourning three storey building, and the Bath store had a new restaurant added in 1965. By 1968 a new separate holding company was formed Jolly & Son (Holdings) Ltd was set up to oversee several other business set up, including an auction house and a transportation company.

In 1970, the business was purchased by E J Dingles and Co, who in turn were purchased by House of Fraser. The Bristol, Queens Road store was closed in 2001, while the Bath store continued to trade as a House of Fraser store albeit with the retained historic Jolly's signage. Following a major refurbishment and restoration of the Milsom Street store in 2014, the Jolly's name was revived. In December 2024, closing down signs appeared in store windows as Frasers Group decided to shutter the department store, one of the oldest in Europe. The store closed in February 2025.

== Reopening ==
However, in March 2025 it was announced that Jolly's would reopen in early 2026 following restoration and repair work on the building. The store will now be owned and operated by Morleys Stores.
