= Morleys Stores =

Department store group

Coordinates: 51.4626°N 0.1154°W

Morleys Stores Ltd
- Company type: Private
- Industry: Retail
- Founded: 1 October 1897
- Headquarters: London
- Key people: Bernard Dreesmann
- Revenue: £90.6 million
- Operating income: £5.6 million
- Number of employees: 1000
- Subsidiaries: Morley's of Bicester Ltd
- Website: www.morleysbrixton.co.uk

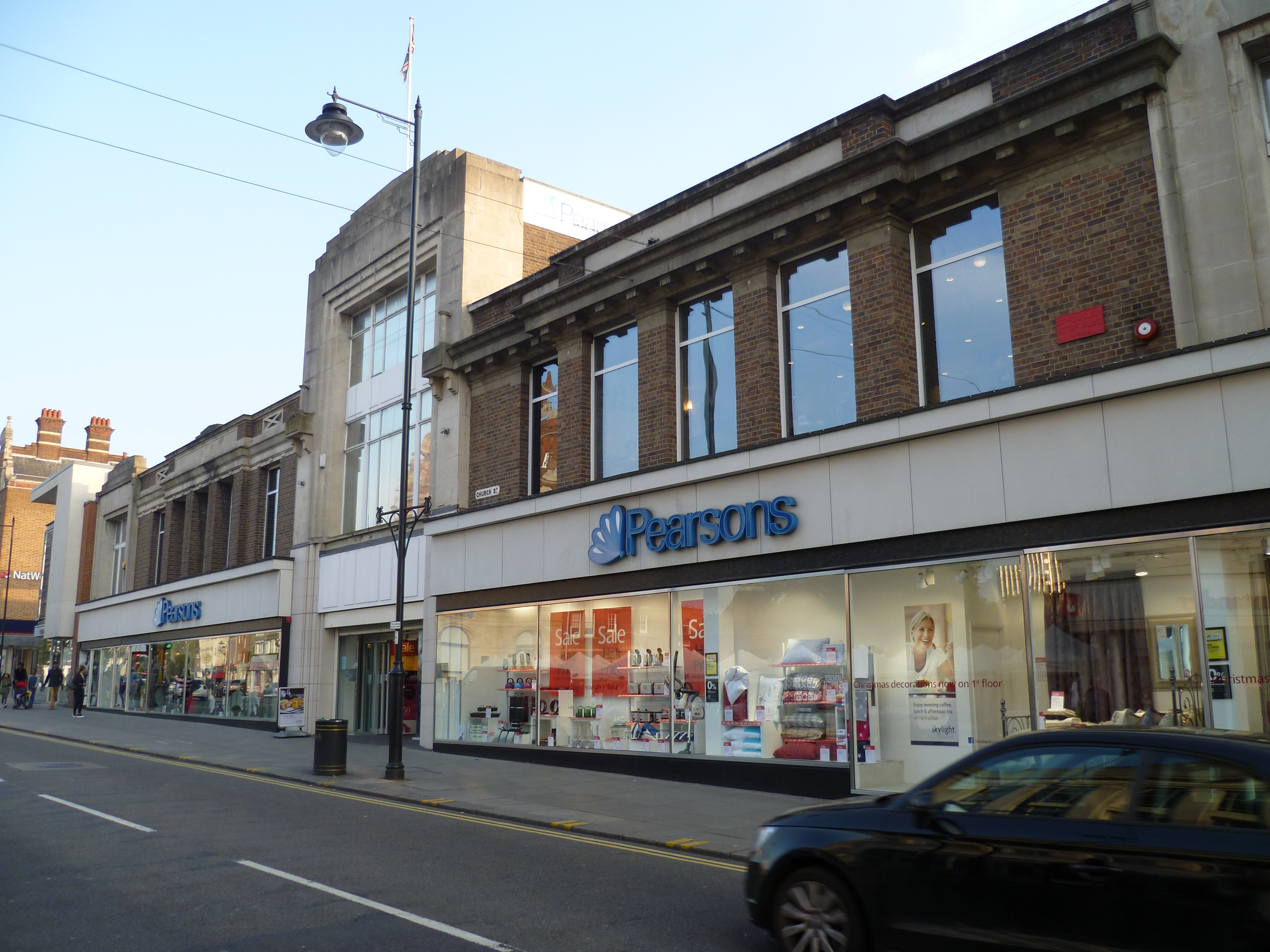
Pearsons, Enfield.

Morleys Stores is a group of eight department stores in Greater London, a business-to-business furniture supply subsidiary called Morley's of Bicester Ltd and a department store & furniture centre called Camp Hopson of Newbury in Newbury, Berkshire. The group is named after the original store that opened in Brixton, south London as Morley & Lanceley.

On 18 March 2025 they announced the acquisition of the Jolly's department store in Milsom Street, Bath, one of the UK's oldest and scheduled to fully reopen after refurbishment in October 2026.

== History ==
In 1854 Joseph Hopson opened a furniture business on West Street, Newbury. In 1886, Alfred Camp opened a drapery bazaar on Northbrook Street. The business ran as separate entities until 1920, when Paul Hopson, grandson of Joseph, married the daughter of Alfred, Norah, and the companies were merged to form Camp Hopson.

In 1929, the Brixton store started selling contract furniture, eventually expanding and moving to Bicester. It acquired the similar businesses of Duncan Roberts Ltd in 2002 and Principal Furniture Ltd in 2005.

The Brixton Road shop originally traded as Morley & Lanceley. In 2009 Morleys bought Roomes Fashion and Home in Upminster and in 2010 it bought the Pearsons stores in Enfield and Bishop's Stortford. Smith Bros in Tooting was rebranded Morleys on 1 November 2010 and the Pearsons store in Bishop's Stortford, Hertfordshire closed during 2012.

In November 2014, Morley's purchased Camp Hopson of Newbury which consists of a department store and furniture centre.

In the year to January 2014 group profit was £5.6 million on turnover of £90.6 million.

In November 2016, it was confirmed that Morleys had signed up for its ninth store, taking over the vacated former British Home Stores premises at Broadway Shopping Centre, Bexleyheath. The new store opened in spring 2017.

In November 2023, the company made a £5.5 million investment in chocolate café chain Knoops Chocolate.

In March 2025 it was announced that Morleys had taken on the lease of the former Jolly's department store in Bath, which had been closed by its prior occupants House of Fraser the previous year. Morleys in Tooting closed on 30 April 2025.

== Operations ==
Morleys is a member of the Solihull-based Associated Independent Stores buying group, the supplier of non-food goods to 350 companies with about 600 small and medium-sized independent outlets with textile and other non-food goods.

List of current Morleys Group stores as of 2025.

Morleys

- Bexleyheath
- Brixton

Using other branding

- Pearsons (in Enfield)
- Selby's (in Holloway) (Formerly James Selby)
- Camp Hopson (in Newbury)
- Roomes (in Upminster)
- Elys (in Wimbledon)

Planned reopening

- Jolly's (in Bath)

== Former stores ==
- Morleys/Smith Bros of Tooting). Closed 30 April 2025
- Bodgers (Ilford) (Closed in 2018)
