= Robert Franklin (divine) =

English nonconformist divine

Robert Franklin (1630–1684) was an English nonconformist divine.

== Education and early career ==
Franklin was born in London 16 July 1630. In his ninth year he went into Suffolk to live with an aunt, and in due course was sent to Woodbridge School. Here, as he confessed, he was too fond of sports, violent in temper, and prone to lying. He was specially trained in writing and accounts with a view to his being apprenticed in London, but his ability led to his being sent to Cambridge University, where he was admitted to Jesus College. His tutor was Samuel Bantoft, whom he succeeded in the office, but he gave up tuition on proving successful in a preaching competition against a Dr. Brooks for the college living of Kirton, Suffolk.

Franklin found that he was unable to subsist in comfort on his living, which only produced £50 a year, and set up a school, which proved to be educationally successful, but a commercial failure. Through a friend's influence he was appointed to the superior living of Bramfield, but here he received nothing at all, as the former incumbent declined to retire. He then obtained the living of Blythburgh, where he remained only a short time, being presented in 1659 to the vicarage of Westhall, where he again found an incumbent, speechless from palsy, who declined to move. Franklin was allowed, however, to perform the duties of the vicar on payment of ten shillings a week to his predecessor, who at length resigned and left him in possession.

== Later career and imprisonments ==
In 1662 he 'left his living rather than defile his conscience.' He became in 1663 private chaplain to Sir Samuel Barnardiston, but after six months went to London and suffered for nonconformity. He was first seized for preaching at Colebrooke, and was lodged in Aylesbury gaol, his goods being confiscated. On his release he took a house in London, and held religious meetings there, but refusing the Corporation Oath he was again imprisoned. A sermon which he preached some time afterwards in Glovers' Hall was followed by his detention for six months in Newgate. Later he was seized in his own house at Bunhill Fields, and committed to the New Prison; he was released shortly, but compelled to appear every sessions, and to give bail for his good behaviour. He died in 1684.

== Writings ==
He is described by Calamy as a man of great gravity and integrity, and a plain, serious preacher. Franklin subscribed his name, among those of fellow-ministers, to A Murderer Punished and Pardoned; or a True Relation of the Wicked Life and Shameful-happy Death of Thos. Savage, imprisoned, justly condemned, and twice executed at Radcliff, by us who were often with him in Newgate. Otherwise he only published Death in Triumph over the most desirable ones, a funeral sermon on Mrs. Mary Parry (1683), for, as he remarks in the preface to this publication, he had not the "itching humour of the scribbling age, nor any desire to appear in print". He left a manuscript entitled Memorable Occurrences of my Life, which is the principal source for the facts of his career. Franklin was married.
