= Itsu =

British chain of East Asian-inspired restaurants

itsu Limited
- Type: Private
- Industry: Fast casual restaurant
- Founded: 1997
- Founder: Julian Metcalfe
- Headquarters: London, England, UK
- Number of locations: 77
- Key people: Clive Schlee
- Products: Food
- Number of employees: 852 (2020)
- Website: itsu.com

itsu Limited (いつ/itsu is Japanese for when) is a British chain of East Asian-inspired fast food shops and restaurants and a grocery company. The company offers franchises.

== History ==
The chain was founded by Julian Metcalfe, co-founder of sandwich chain Pret a Manger, in partnership with Clive Schlee.

In 2006, following the poisoning of Alexander Litvinenko, traces of the deadly isotope Polonium-210 were found at the Piccadilly branch of Itsu in London, where Litvinenko had dined on the day he was poisoned.

== Outlets and expansion ==
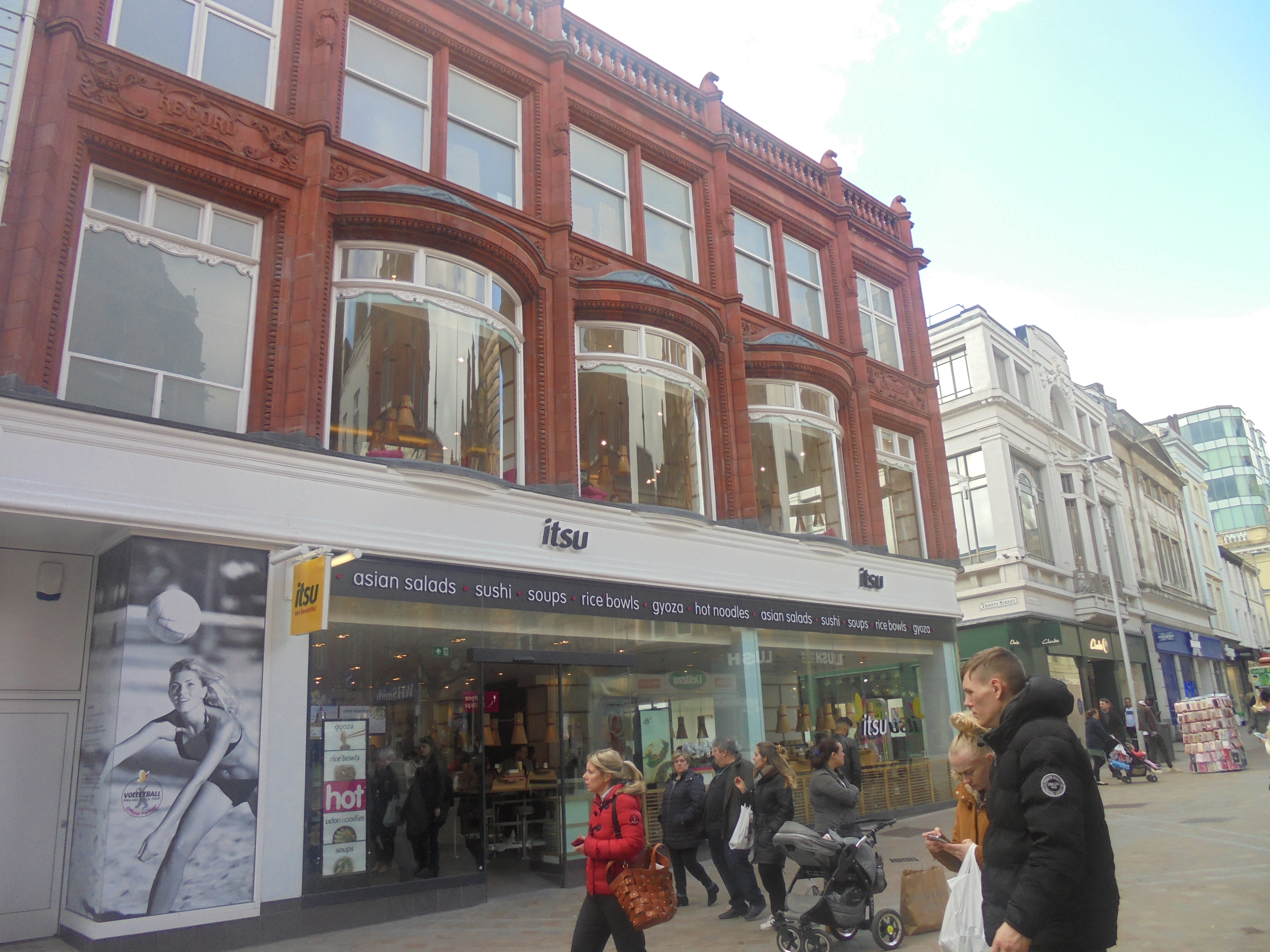
itsu, Commercial Street, Leeds

The first itsu restaurant opened in Chelsea, London in 1997. In September 2013, itsu opened its first restaurant outside London, in Oxford.

In January 2016, itsu opened its first Northern England restaurant, in Spinningfields, central Manchester. The chain later opened a branch in Leeds.

As of 2022 itsu had 76 restaurants in England, including 54 in London (44 in February 2023), and one in Brussels Airport, Belgium.

In June 2018, the company opened a branch in Midtown Manhattan, New York City, US. In June 2026 itsu's website listed Brussels as the only non-UK location.

== itsu [grocery] ==
In March 2012, Metcalfe's Food Company, run by Robert Jakobi, launched the itsu brand into retail under the name itsu [grocery].

== Partnerships ==
In January 2014, itsu became the official partner of the Volleyball England Beach Tour, but was not listed on the UKBT Web site as of 2021.

== Operations and management ==
Itsu operates a mix of company-owned and franchised restaurants, with around 80 UK sites reported in 2024 and plans announced to double the estate over time. International locations include Brussels Airport and Paris run with franchise partners. The group uses digital ordering kiosks and has trialled greater automation, re-introducing additional staffed tills in 2025 to balance throughput and service.
