= Justin Tan =

Australian chess grandmaster (born 1997)

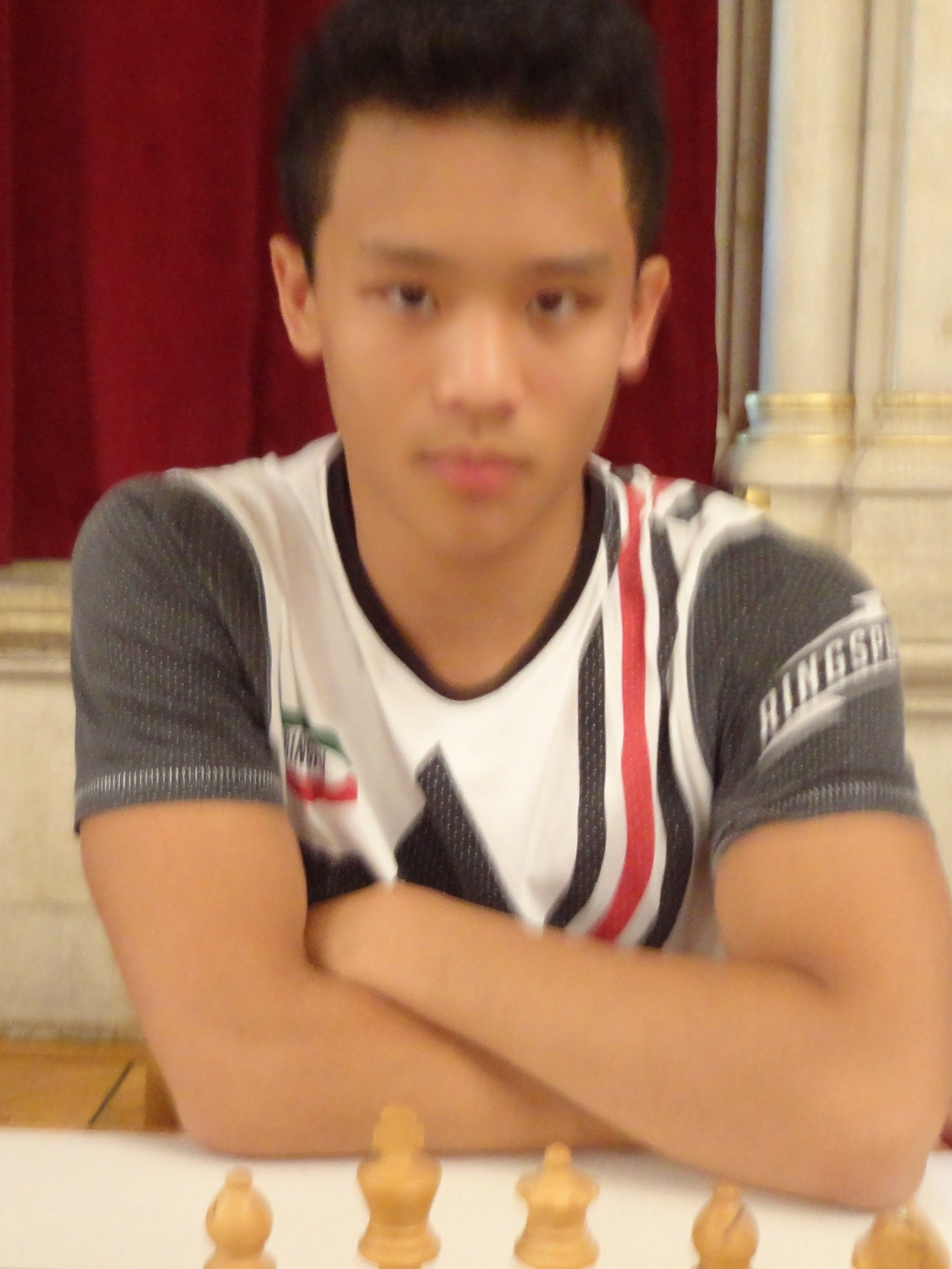
- Tan in 2015

Personal information
- Born: 19 March 1997 (age 29) Cardiff, Wales

Chess career
- Country: Australia
- Title: Grandmaster (2018)
- FIDE rating: 2510 (July 2026)
- Peak rating: 2533 (March 2022)

Justin Tan (born 19 March 1997) is an Australian chess player. He was awarded the title of Grandmaster by FIDE in 2018, becoming the 8th Australian to achieve the title. He was formerly British Blitz Champion and was British Under-21 Champion twice (2016 and 2018).

== Chess career ==
Tan learned to play chess at the age of seven. As a junior, he represented Australia at four World Youth Chess Championships (Vietnam 2008, Under-12), (Turkey 2009, U-16), (Brazil 2011, Under-14), (Greece 2015, Under-18) and twice at the World Youth Chess Olympiad in Turkey (2012) and China (2013).

Tan moved to England in 2013 to study under a chess scholarship at Woodbridge School, Suffolk. He became an International Master in 2015 after gaining his final International Master norm at the Bunratty Classic, Ireland.

In 2015, Tan achieved his first Grandmaster norm at the Colin Crouch Memorial Congress at Harrow, London. At the 2015 Under-18 World Youth Chess Championships in Greece, Tan tied for fourth place, after defeating GM Kirill Alekseenko.

In 2016, Tan tied for third place with GM Gawain Jones and also became British Under-21 Champion at the 103rd British Chess Championship at Bournemouth, gaining his second GM norm in the process. In the same year, Tan was joint winner with GM Luke McShane at the DeMontford Bell Kings Place Rapidplay.

In 2018, Tan won the Paracin Open in Serbia, securing his final GM norm and the Grandmaster title. He became British Blitz Champion in 2019 after winning the UK Open Blitz Championship.

In 2021, Tan won the O2C Doeberl Cup in Canberra, Australia, with a score of 7.5/9. In 2022, he won the inaugural Chessemy Open in Reinstorf, Germany, in a field of over 160 players.

Tan represented Australia on Board 4 at the 44th Chess Olympiad in Chennai scoring 5/8.

Tan plays in the top division of the UK 4NCL for Wood Green and has previously played in the Dutch and the Icelandic leagues for BSG and Taflfélag Garðabæjar respectively.

== Books ==
- Tan, Justin (2021). 1.e4! The Chess Bible – Volume 1 – A Complete Repertoire for White . Thinkers Publishing. ISBN 9789464201123

== Biography ==
Tan was born and grew up in Cardiff, South Wales, United Kingdom. He is a dual Australian and British citizen.

Until 2013, Tan was an elite national gymnast and a member of the Australian national artistic gymnastics squad. He was the Australian Under-16 national individual apparatus champion on pommel horse in 2012.

Tan graduated in law from the University of Edinburgh and is an Erasmus alumnus of Utrecht University.
