= Edith Pretty =

British landowner (1883–1942)

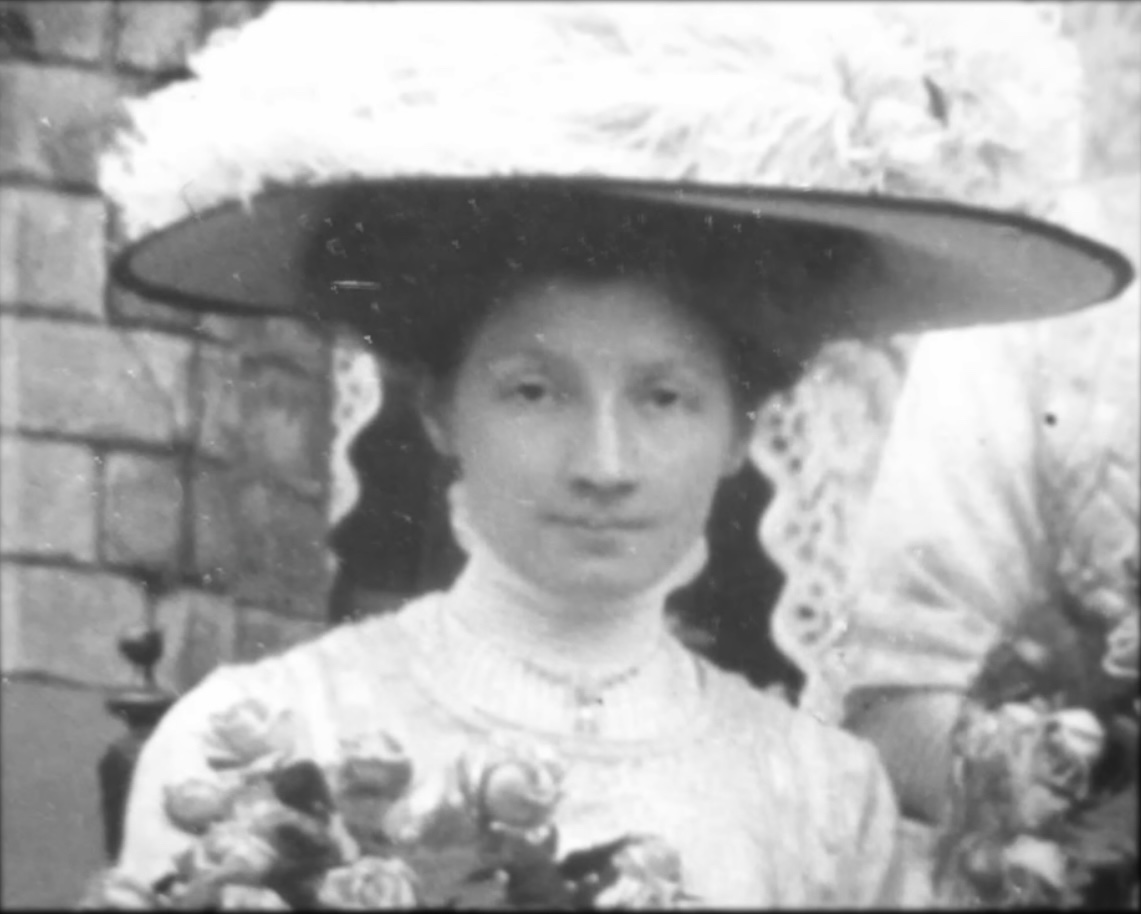
- Born: Edith May Dempster; 1 August 1883; Elland, West Riding of Yorkshire, England
- Died: 17 December 1942 (aged 59); Richmond, Surrey, England
- Occupations: Landowner, benefactor, magistrate
- Spouse: Frank Pretty (m. 1926; died 1934)
- Children: Robert Dempster Pretty
- Parents: Robert Dempster; Elizabeth Dempster (née Brunton)

Edith May Pretty (née Dempster; 1 August 1883 – 17 December 1942) was an English landowner on whose land the Sutton Hoo ship burial was discovered after she hired Basil Brown, a local excavator and amateur archaeologist, to determine whether anything lay beneath the mounds on her property.

== Early life ==
Edith Dempster was born in Elland, Yorkshire, to Elizabeth (née Brunton, died 1919) and Robert Dempster (born 1853). She had an older sister, Elizabeth. The Dempsters were wealthy industrialists who amassed their fortune from the manufacture of equipment related to the gas industry. Robert Dempster's father, also named Robert Dempster, had founded Robert Dempster and Sons in 1855 for this purpose.

In 1884 the family moved to Manchester, where Robert founded the engineering firm R. & J. Dempster with his brother, John. The family travelled extensively abroad, visiting Egypt, Greece, and Austria-Hungary. After finishing her education at Roedean School in East Sussex, Edith Dempster spent six months in Paris in 1901. Later that year, the family embarked on a world tour that included visits to British India and the United States.

From 1907 to 1925, Edith’s father Robert Dempster took a lease on Vale Royal Abbey, a country house near Whitegate, Cheshire, the family seat of Lord Delamere. There, the family had an indoor staff of 25, in addition to 18 gardeners. She engaged in public and charitable works that included helping to buy land for a Christian mission.

== Later life ==
During the First World War, Edith Dempster served as quartermaster at the Red Cross' auxiliary hospital at Winsford, and helped to house Belgian refugees. By 1917 she was working with the French Red Cross at Vitry-le-François, and Le Bourget in France.

After her mother's death in 1919, Edith Dempster cared for her father at Vale Royal. When he died in Cape Town during a visit to South Africa in 1925, Edith and her sister Elizabeth inherited an estate valued at more than £500,000 – about £39 million in 2025.

In 1926 Edith Dempster married Frank Pretty (1878–1934), of Ipswich, who had first proposed to her on her 18th birthday, and had corresponded with her during the war. Frank Pretty was the son of William Tertius Pretty (1842–1916), the owner of a corset-making and drapery business in Ipswich. Frank Pretty had been a major in the Suffolk Regiment's 4th (Territorial) Battalion and was wounded twice during the war. His participation in 1915 in the Battle of Neuve Chapelle was captured in a painting by the artist Fred Roe. After the war, Frank Pretty continued to serve the Suffolk Regiment, obtaining the rank of lieutenant colonel and commander of the 4th Battalion in 1922, while also working in the family business.

Edith Dempster Pretty gave up the lease on Vale Royal after her marriage to Frank Pretty and bought the 213-hectare (530-acre) Sutton Hoo estate, including Sutton Hoo House, along the River Deben, near Woodbridge, Suffolk. She served as a magistrate in Woodbridge, and in 1926 donated the Dempster Challenge Cup to Winsford Urban District Council, the town of her former Red Cross posting. The Cup has been awarded annually for most years since to a plot-holder on Winsford's garden allotments.

On 7 September 1930, aged 47, Edith Dempster Pretty gave birth to a son, Robert Dempster Pretty. Four years later Frank Pretty died on his 56th birthday in 1934, from stomach cancer diagnosed earlier that year.

Edith Dempster Pretty became interested in Spiritualism, visiting a faith healer named William Parish and supporting a Spiritualist church in Woodbridge.

== Archaeology at Sutton Hoo ==
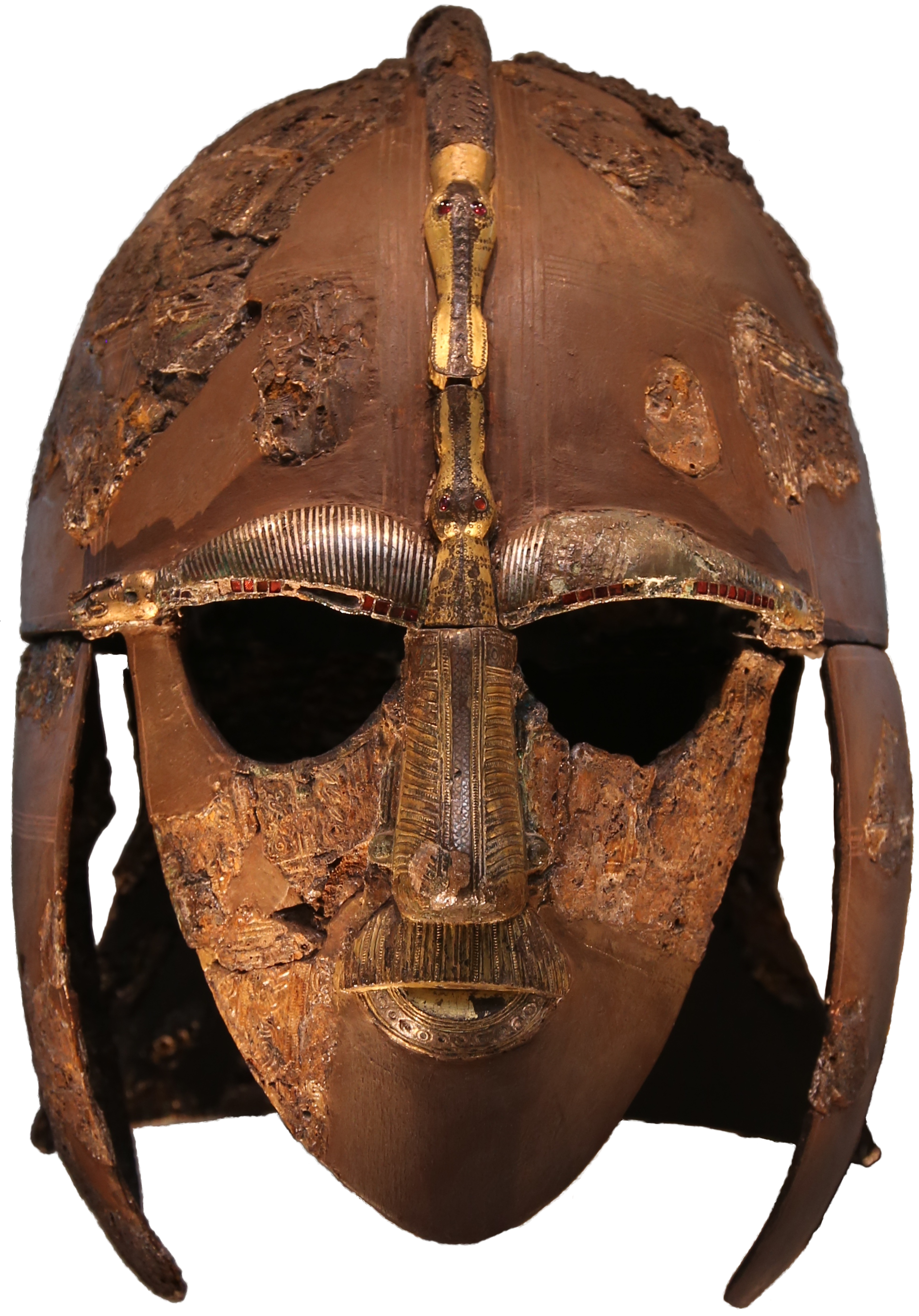
A reconstruction of the Sutton Hoo helmet, 1971.

Edith Dempster Pretty had become acquainted with archaeological digs early in her life through her travels. In addition, her friend Florence Sayce's Egyptologist uncle, Archibald Sayce, and Edith’s father, Robert Dempster, excavated a Cistercian abbey adjoining their home at Vale Royal.

Around 18 ancient burial mounds lay on the Sutton Hoo estate, about 450 m (490 yd) from the Pretty home (now Tranmer House, then called Sutton Hoo House). At the 1937 Woodbridge Flower Fete, Edith Dempster Pretty discussed the possibility of an excavation with Vincent B. Redstone, a member of the Suffolk Institute of Archaeology, and Fellow of both the Royal Historical Society and the Society of Antiquaries. Redstone and the curator of the Ipswich Corporation Museum, Guy Maynard, met Edith Dempster Pretty in July regarding the project, and the self-taught Suffolk archaeologist Basil Brown was subsequently invited to excavate the mounds. Promising finds were made, and Brown returned in the summer of 1939 for further work on the project. He soon unearthed the remains of a large burial site, containing what was later identified as a 7th-century Saxon ship, which may have been the last resting place of King Rædwald of East Anglia. A curator of the British Museum described the discovery as "one of the most important archaeological discoveries of all time".

The excavation was subsequently taken over by a team of professional archaeologists headed by Charles Phillips and including Cecily Margaret Guido and Stuart Piggott. In September 1939, a treasure trove inquest determined that the grave goods unearthed from the ship were Edith Pretty's property. She subsequently donated the trove to the British Museum. In recognition of this, Prime Minister Winston Churchill later offered Edith Pretty the honour of a CBE, but she declined.

== Death and subsequent ownership ==
Edith Dempster Pretty died on 17 December 1942 at Richmond Hospital in London at the age of 59, of a blood clot on the brain after suffering a stroke. She was buried in All Saints' churchyard at Sutton. A portrait of a 56-year-old Pretty was painted by the Dutch artist Cor Visser and donated to the National Trust by David Pretty, her grandson. Most of her estate of £400,000 was placed in a trust for her son, Robert, who was subsequently cared for by his mother’s sister, Elizabeth. Robert went to school at Eton and afterwards went into farming. He died of stomach cancer (as did his father) on 14 June 1988 at the age of 57. Sutton Hoo was used by the War Office until 1946, when it was sold. In the late 20th century the house and the Sutton Hoo burial site were bequeathed by the Tranmer family to the National Trust, which now manages the site.

== Portrayals in media ==
Edith Dempster Pretty was the subject of a play by Karen Forbes performed at Sutton Hoo in 2019, and features in the novel The Dig by John Preston, published in 2007. She is portrayed by Carey Mulligan in the film adaptation of the same name, released on the Netflix streaming service in 2021.
