= Knoops Chocolate =

Chocolate café chain and retailer

Knoops Holdings Ltd.
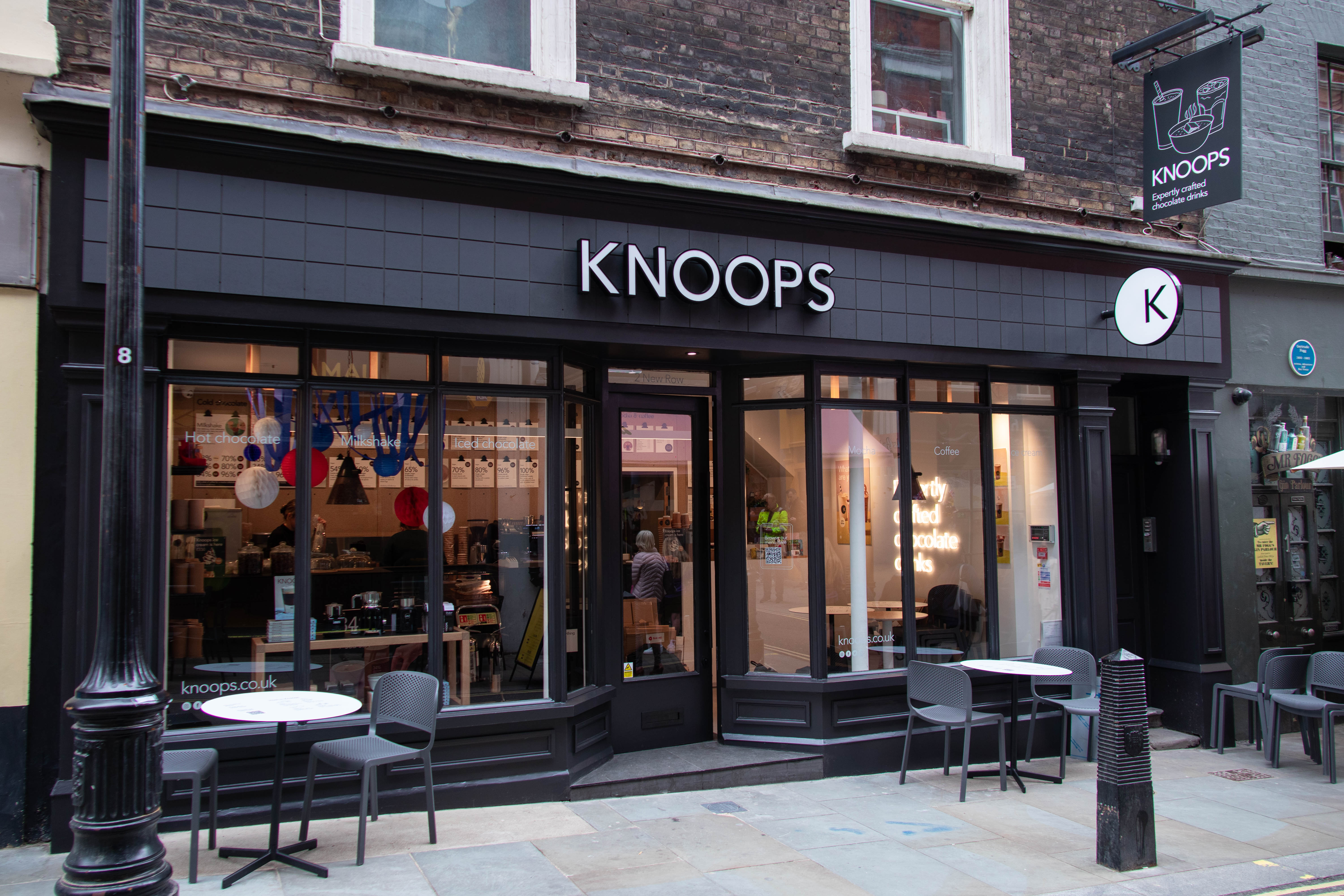
- Type: Privately held company
- Industry: Hospitality
- Founded: 2013
- Founder: Jens Knoop
- Headquarters: London, England, UK
- Number of locations: 24 shops (Jan 2025)
- Area served: United Kingdom
- Key people: Jens Knoop (Founder); William Gordon-Harris (Chief Executive)
- Website: www.knoops.com

Knoops, (pronounced "kuh-noops"), is a British chocolate café chain and retailer based in London, England. The business operates a chain of cafés specialising in chocolate drinks, and offering a range of over 20 chocolates from 28% White Chocolate to 100% Extra Dark. The chain was launched in 2013 and, as of January 2025, has outlets in 27 locations in the UK, two in Dubai and one in Abu Dhabi, with further international expansion underway. The company also produces drinking chocolate and other products which are sold in their cafés, premium retailers Selfridges, Harrods, Whole Foods, Ocado and through knoops.com.

== History ==
Knoops Chocolate was founded in 2013 by Jens Knoop, a former IT manager who grew up in Germany and was interested in chocolate from an early age. He opened the first Knoops café in Rye, East Sussex, England in 2013, serving hot chocolate, milkshakes, iced chocolate and coffee.

In 2019, the company received investment from William Gordon-Harris, who was appointed executive chairman. Knoops began opening more stores across the UK and launched its online retail offering shortly after.

Since 2020, it has opened six more locations in London including Kensington, Richmond, Chelsea, Notting Hill, Knightsbridge and Covent Garden.

In 2021, the company opened a café and store in Brighton. In March 2022, the company opened a store in Oxford, England.

In 2023, it opened more stores in England including Manchester, Chester, Cambridge, Guildford, Bath and St Albans. In July, Knoops appointed William Gordon-Harris as its chief executive. In November, the company raised £8.3 million of investment, with the majority coming from London department store Morleys Stores. In December, Knoops announced a partnership with new Wonka film when it was released in cinemas in the UK.. In November 2025, the brand also partnered with the film Paddington in Peru to mark its cinema release.

In 2024, the company opened new stores in Edinburgh, Leeds, Bristol, Exeter, Nottingham, York, Belfast and Newcastle.. In November 2024, Knoops opened its first international store at City Centre Mirdif in Dubai.

In the same year, it also announced a new £5 million fundraise of which just under £2 million was raised from customers on Crowdcube. The investment valued the business at £34 million. The company also reported sales of £9.3 million for the year to March 2024, an increase of 110 per cent on the prior year.

In August 2024, Knoops appointed Alice Avis to its non-executive board. The company appointed Andrew Gerrie to its board in January 2025. Gerrie was appointed chair of its board in March 2025.

In 2025, Knoops continued its expansion with new UK locations in Norwich, Colchester and Cardiff. Internationally, it opened further Middle East stores in Meydan (Nad Al Sheba) in Dubai and at Yas Mall in Abu Dhabi.

In March 2025, Knoops was listed in the FT1000, the list of Europe’s 1,000 fastest growing companies for 2025, compiled by the Financial Times. It was ranked 186 and the seventh fastest growing food and beverage brand.[30] In the same month, Knoops appointed Martin Long as a non-executive director to its board. In 2025, Knoops also received Great Taste Awards across three of its signature products, including three stars for its cacao tea.

== Concept ==
The company produces a variety of drinking chocolate flakes and a variety of seasonal and gift products. It also offers coffee, marshmallows and its own cookbook.

Knoops allows experimentation with different percentages of chocolate and flavours in a process it calls 'Knoopology'. In this process, customers can choose the percentage of chocolate, their choice of milk and add extra natural flavors such as sea salt, orange zest or chilli, to be made into a hot chocolate, milkshake or iced chocolate.
