= Blackerby Fairfax =

English physician

Blackerby Fairfax (fl. 1728) was an English physician.

== Life ==
Blackerby Fairfax was the son of Nathaniel Fairfax. He was educated at Woodbridge School and Corpus Christi College, Cambridge, where he took the two degrees in arts, B.A. 1689, M.A. 1693, and was created M.D. ‘comitiis regiis’ in 1728. After leaving Cambridge he studied medicine at the university of Leyden, of which he was admitted M.D. on 18 April 1696. He was appointed a physician in the navy, but had retired by 1717.

== Works ==
He wrote a number of philosophical works reflecting his wide range of scientific and political interests:

- (anon.) A Discourse upon the Uniting Scotland with England: containing the general advantage of such an Union to both Kingdoms, &c., 8vo, London, 1702
- In Laudem Botanices Oratio ... On the Praise of Botany, a speech, &c. ... To which is added a præfatory discourse for establishing a lecture on botany, 4to, London, 1717, in both Latin and English.
- Oratio Apologetica pro Re Herbaria contra Medicos Mathematicos. ... A Speech ... wherein is given the idea of vegetation and a plea for the use of botany in physick against the neglect of it in favour of mathematicks, in both Latin and English, 4to, London, 1718
- A Treatise of the Just Interest of the Kings of England, in their free disposing power, &c., 12mo, London, 1703, a tract attributed to Matthew Hale, the foremost 17th-century jurist of English procedure. The dispensing power advocated by Judge Jeffries as belonging entirely to the King, residing in his absolute right to determine justice, was in direct contravention of Hale's insistence on precedence, within an organic developing legal system independent of political interference. To this Fairfax added a prefatory discourse in answer to a discourse on grants and resumptions
- The Letter which Pope Gregory XV wrote to Charles I of England concerning his marriage to the Infanta of Spain, and that Prince's Answer, which drew forth some Observations (4to, Ipswich, 1729) from William Matthews.
