= P. I. B. Ping =

Kansas state senator

Peru Italian Blackerby Ping (September 4, 1842 – August 22, 1890) was a lawyer, real estate agent, and state legislator in Kansas. He served in the Kansas Senate in 1877 and 1879. He was stationed in Oregon from 1882 to 1885 at the predecessor to the Bureau of Land Management and his letters were published in his hometown newspaper. He was born in Burlington, Iowa.
