= Julian Metcalfe =

British businessman (born 1959)

Julian Metcalfe OBE
- Born: 14 December 1959 (age 66)
- Occupation: Businessman
- Known for: Founder and CEO of itsu Founder of Metcalfe's Food Company
- Spouses: Melanie Willson Faggionato (m. 1992; div. 2005) Brooke Douglass de Ocampo (m. 2008)
- Children: 3

Julian Edward Metcalfe (born 14 December 1959) is a British entrepreneur and founder of food retailers Itsu and Metcalfe's Food Company. Both these companies have global presence.

== Early life and education ==
Metcalfe is the son of insurance broker and investment banker David Metcalfe and his wife Alexa (née Boycun), the widow of Alexander Korda. His paternal grandfather was Edward Dudley Metcalfe, an officer in the British Indian Army and a close friend and equerry of Edward VIII. One of his great-grandfathers was George Curzon, 1st Marquess Curzon of Kedleston, a Governor-General of India, and a great-grandmother was the American heiress Mary Curzon, Baroness Curzon of Kedleston.

Metcalfe was educated at Harrow School in north-west London. He later attended the Polytechnic of Central London, where he first met his later business partner, Sinclair Beecham.

== Career ==
Metcalfe founded Pret a Manger, the popular sandwich shop, with college friend Sinclair Beecham in 1986, after purchasing the name and assets from the original founder Jeffrey Hyman. In May 2018, Pret was bought for £1.5 billion, and Metcalfe's stake was valued at £75 million.

Metcalfe founded itsu in 1997. He currently owns 54% of the company.

Metcalfe founded Metcalfe's Food Company in 2008. It sells Asian inspired food under the brand name itsu and a range of snack food under the brand name Metcalfe’s Skinny. itsu[grocery], which produces, around 100 product, is also a subsidiary and supplies ingredients to the itsu restaurants.

Metcalfe's skinny snack food Metcalfe's Skinny Topcorn is a popular brand of popcorn in the United Kingdom.

In September 2016, Metcalfe sold his interests in Metcalfes Skinny in full to Kettle Foods owner Snyder's-Lance.

According to the Sunday Times Rich List in 2019, Metcalfe is worth £215 million, an increase of £51 million from 2018.

Already a Member of the Order of the British Empire (MBE), he was appointed Officer of the Order of the British Empire (OBE) in the 2014 Birthday Honours for services to the hospitality industry.

In August 2024, Metcalfe was appointed as a non-executive director of Knoops Chocolate.
