= Seckford Trust =

The Seckford Trust (or Seckford Foundation) is a charitable trust founded in the 16th century by Thomas Seckford that remains active to this day. The trust is based in and operates in the area of Woodbridge, Suffolk.

The trust operates Woodbridge School, a co-educational boarding school founded in 1577 with 725 students of ages four through eighteen.

It also operates the Seckford Almshouses, the Deben Family Centre, and other facilities, and gives grants to needy individuals and deserving organizations.

In 2006, it opened a theatre within the grounds of Woodbridge school, called the Seckford Theatre.
