= Woodbridge, Suffolk =

Port town in Suffolk, England

Woodbridge
- Town
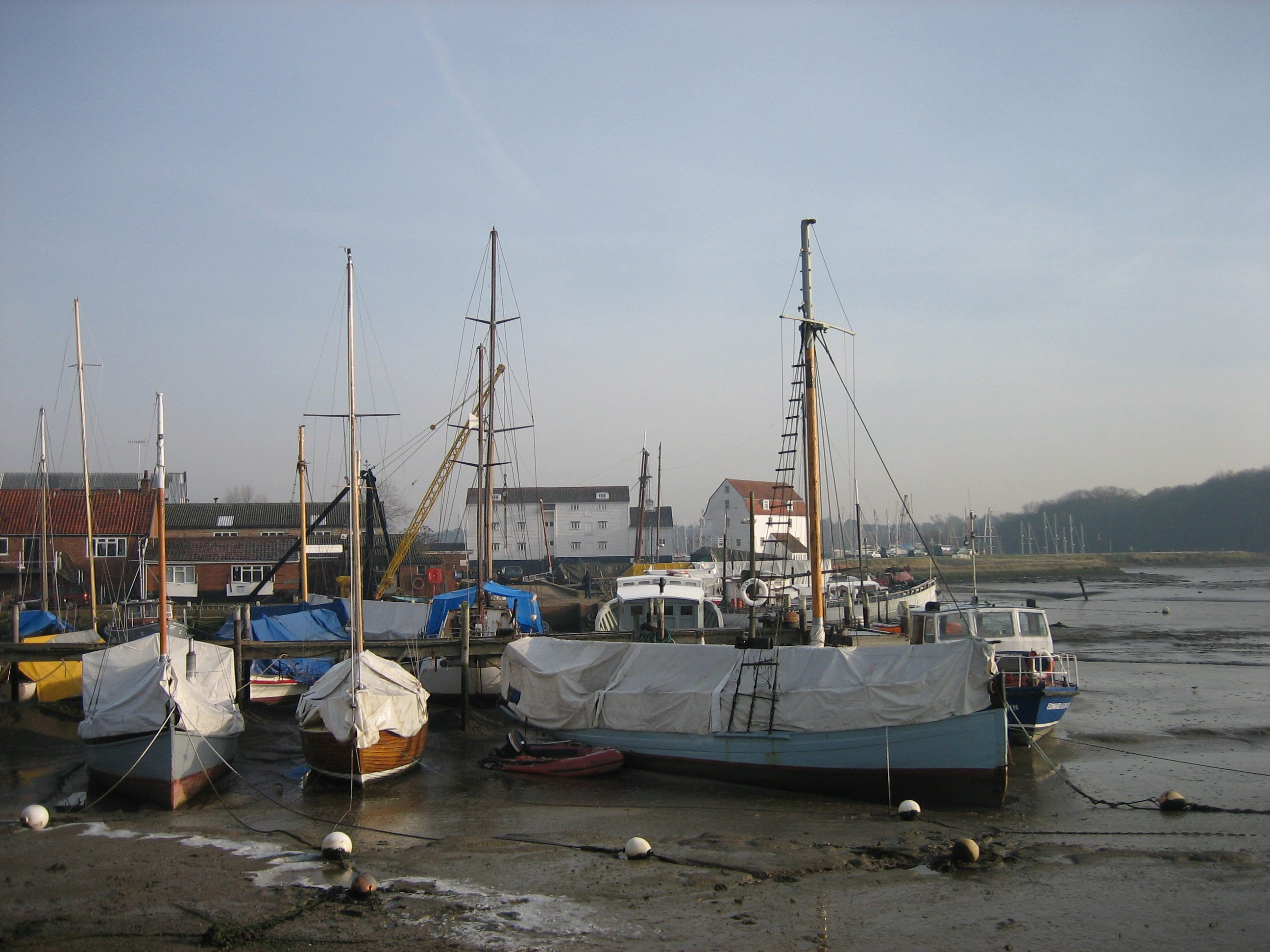
- The harbour, with Woodbridge Tide Mill in the background

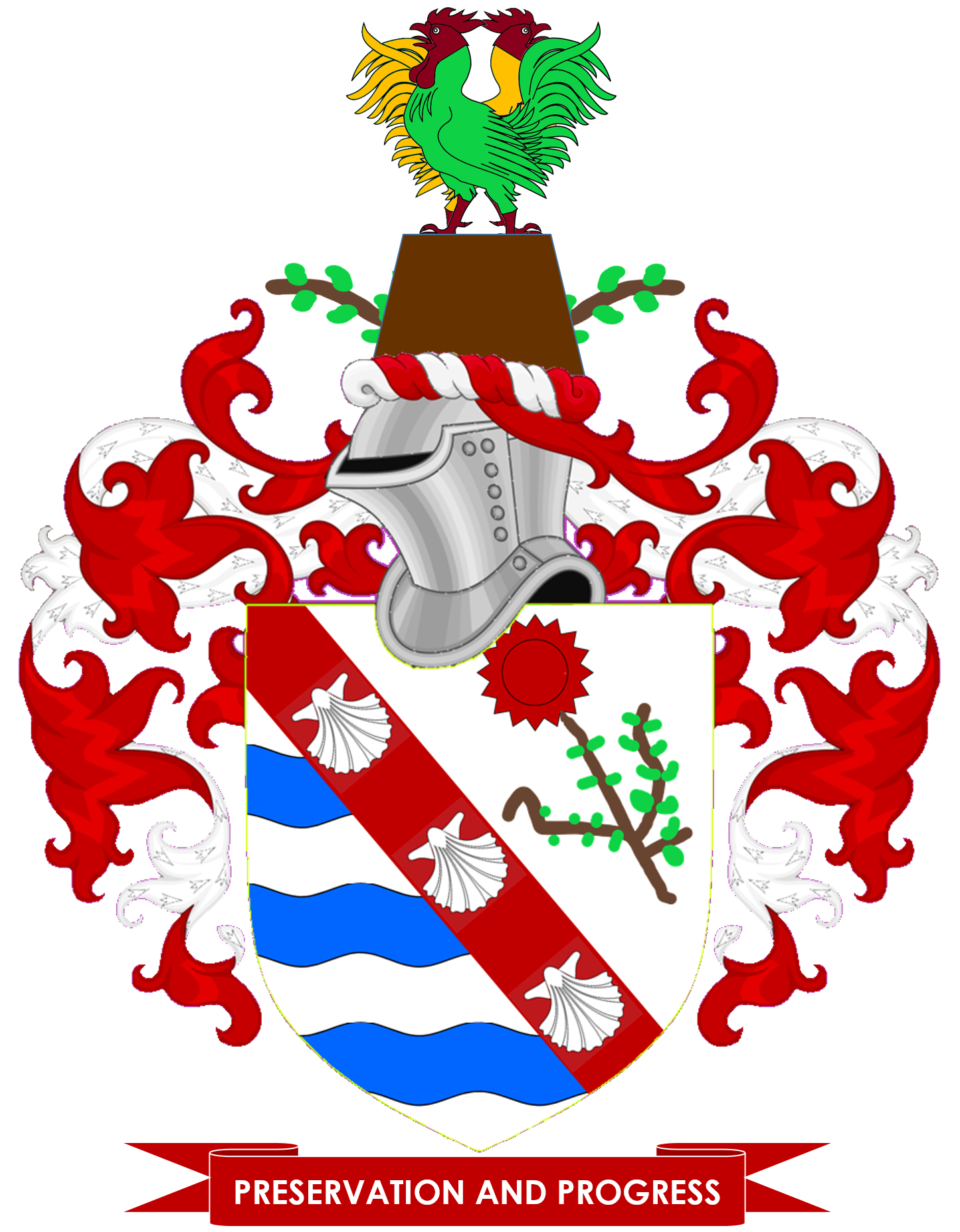
- Coat of arms

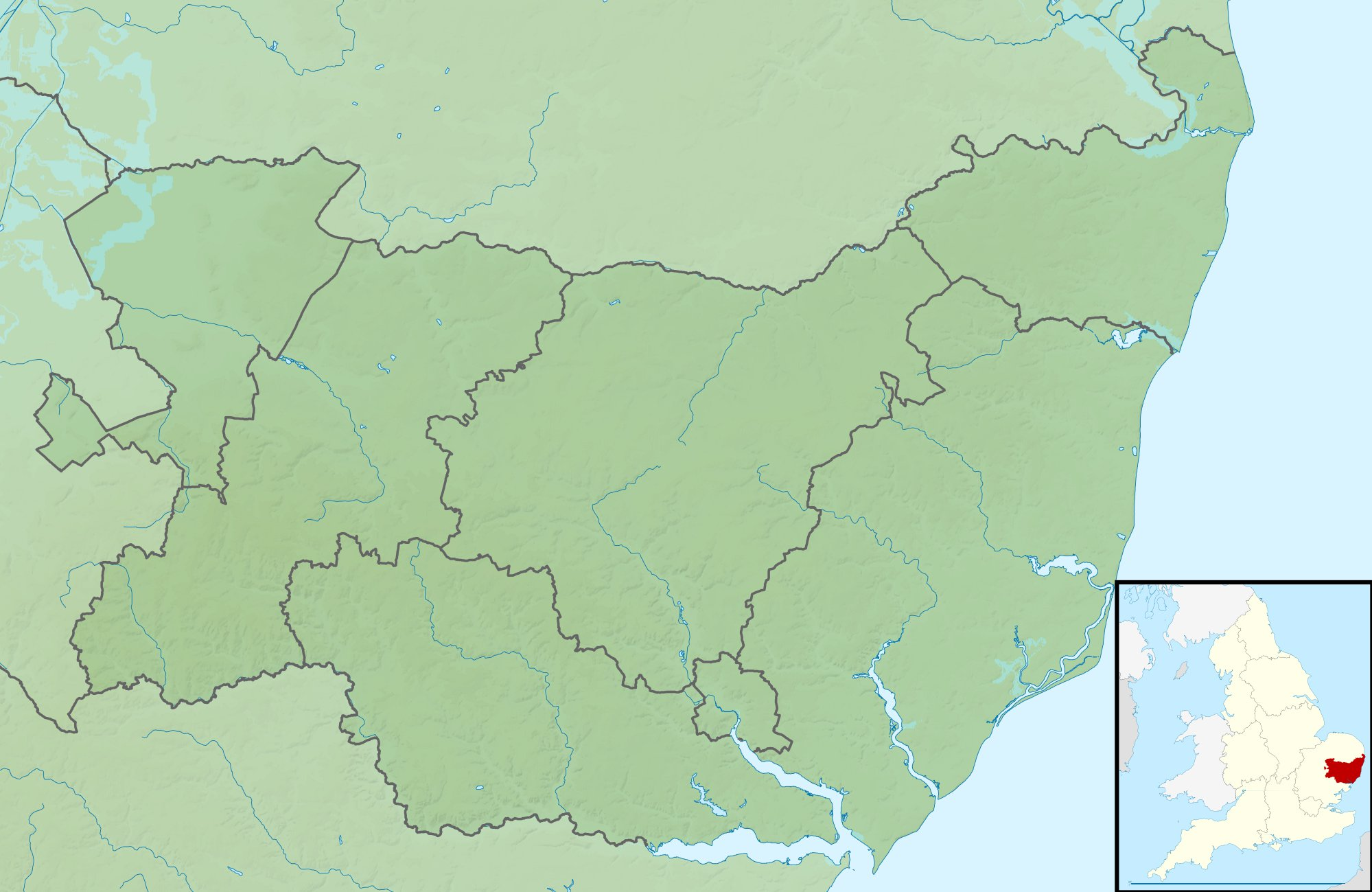
- Location within Suffolk Location within the United Kingdom
- Coordinates: 52°05′38″N 01°19′12″E
- Sovereign state: United Kingdom
- Constituent Country: England
- Region: East Anglia
- County: Suffolk

Population (2011)
  - Total: 7,749
  - Estimate (2020): 8,244
- (2011 Census)
- Postcode: IP12, IP13
- Area code: 01394
- Website: www.eastsuffolk.gov.uk

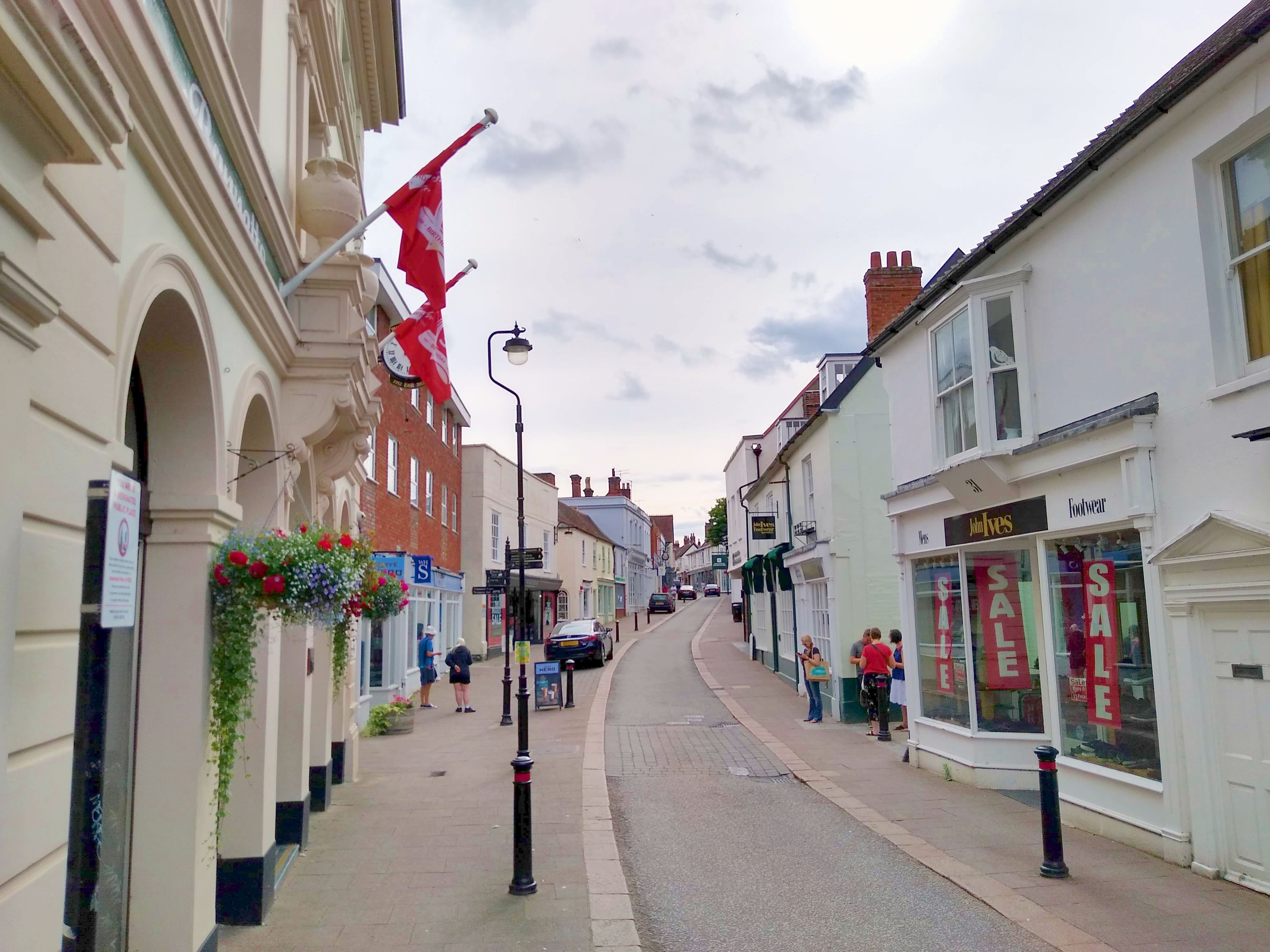
Woodbridge Thoroughfare in July 2017

Woodbridge is a port town and civil parish in the East Suffolk district of Suffolk, England. It is 8 miles (13 km) up the River Deben from the sea. It lies 7 miles (11 km) north-east of Ipswich and around 74 miles (119 km) north-east of London. In 2011 it had a population of 7,749.

The town is close to some major archaeological sites of the Anglo-Saxon period, including the Sutton Hoo burial ship. It is well known for its boating harbour and tide mill next to the River Deben, in the Suffolk & Essex Coast & Heaths National Landscape. Several festivals are held. As a "gem in Suffolk's crown" (according to The Suffolk Coast tourist site) it has been named the best place to live in the East of England.

== Etymology ==
Historians disagree over the etymology of Woodbridge. The Dictionary of British Placenames (2003) suggests that it is a combination of the Old English wudu (wood) and brycg (bridge). The Sutton Hoo Society's 1988 magazine Saxon points out, however, that there is no suitable site for a bridge at Woodbridge, or any fordable sites until Wilford, the site of the current bridge, several miles upstream. It also raises that an Anglo-Saxon bridge being wooden would have been unlikely to be worthy of comment. It suggests that it might instead have been a combination of odde (a cognate of the Old Scandinavian oddi meaning 'promontory or cape') and breg (from the Anglo-Saxon brego meaning king – note the closeness of Sutton Hoo) or more likely bryg (a cognate of the Norwegian brygge or quay).

The Suffolk Traveller (1764) suggests a similar origin to The Dictionary but originating from a bridge over a hollow way that leads from Woodbridge Market Place to the Ipswich. But this is disputed by Rev. Thomas Carthew, then perpetual curate of Woodbridge who points out that the bridge had existed for less than a hundred years at that point and therefore was not old enough to be the source of the name. He instead suggests Oden or Woden (Odin) and Burgh, Bury, or Brigg (town). The Topographical Dictionary of England (1840) suggests a combination of Woden and Bryge.

== History and heritage ==
Archaeological finds point to habitation in the area from the Neolithic Age (2500–1700 BCE). A ritual site was found while excavations were made for the East Anglia Array, a wind farm at Seven Springs Field. The area was occupied by the Romans for 300 years after Queen Boudica's failed rebellion in 59 CE, but there is little evidence of their presence.

After the Roman forces were recalled to Rome in 410 CE, substantial Anglo-Saxon (Germanic) settlement ensued. The Angles gave their name to East Anglia.

King Rædwald of East Anglia was Bretwalda, the most powerful king in England in the early 7th century. He died in about 624 CE and is often associated with the burial at Sutton Hoo, across the River Deben from Woodbridge. The burial ship is 89 feet (27 m) long. The treasures discovered there in 1939 were the richest finds ever on British soil. They are held now in the British Museum in London, but replicas of some items and the story of the finds can be seen in the Woodbridge Museum. The National Trust has built a visitor centre on the site.

The earliest record of Woodbridge as such dates from the mid-10th century, when it was acquired by St Aethelwold, Bishop of Winchester, as part of the endowment of a monastery he helped to refound at Ely, Cambridgeshire in 970. The Domesday Book of 1086 describes Woodbridge as part of Loes Hundred with 35 households, i.e. one of the largest 20 per cent of settlements recorded. Much of Woodbridge was granted to the powerful Bigod family, who built the castle at Framlingham.

The town has been a centre for boatbuilding, rope-making and sail-making since the Middle Ages. Edward III and Sir Francis Drake had fighting ships built in Woodbridge. The town suffered in the plague of 1349, but recovered enough, with encouragement from the Canons and growing general prosperity, to have a new church (St Mary's, behind the buildings on the south side of Market Hill) built of limestone from the Wash and decorated with Thetford flint. By the mid-15th century the Brews family had added a tower and porch.

On 12 October 1534, Prior Henry Bassingbourne confirmed Henry VIII's supremacy over the Church and rejected the incumbent "Roman Bishop". Nonetheless, Woodbridge Priory was dissolved three years later.

As religious unrest continued under the Roman Catholic Queen Mary, Alexander Gooch, a weaver of Woodbridge, and Alice Driver of Grundisburgh were burnt for heresy on Rushmere Heath. Alice had previously had her ears cut off for likening Queen Mary to Jezebel. Subsequent religious settlement under Elizabeth I helped Woodbridge industries such as weaving, sail-cloth manufacture, rope-making and salt making to prosper, along with the wool trade. The port was enlarged, and shipbuilding and the timber trade became lucrative, so that a customs house was established in 1589.

The town has various buildings of the Tudor, Georgian, Regency and Victorian periods, and a tide mill in working order, one of only two in the UK and among the earliest. The mill first recorded on the site in 1170 was run by Augustinian canons. In 1536 it passed to King Henry VIII. In 1564, Queen Elizabeth I granted the mill and the priory to Thomas Seckford, who in 1577 founded Woodbridge School and the Seckford Almshouses for the poor of Woodbridge. Two windmills survive, Buttrum's Mill, and Tricker's Mill, of which Buttrum's is open to the public.

In 1943, the Royal Air Force (RAF) built a military airfield east of Woodbridge. RAF Woodbridge was used during the Cold War by the United States Air Force as the base for two Tactical Fighter Squadrons until 1993.

== Governance ==
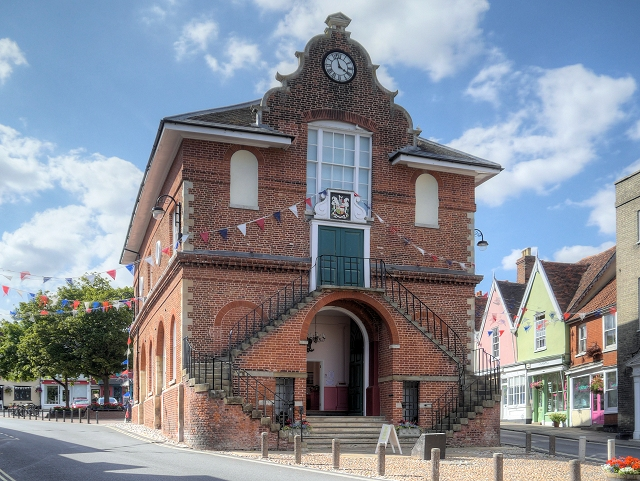
Woodbridge Shire Hall

Woodbridge lies in the East Suffolk district of the shire county of Suffolk. It is a civil parish; the town council, which is based at Woodbridge Shire Hall has a mayor and 16 councillors elected for four wards. The town is currently represented by the Labour MP Jenny Riddell-Carpenter in the Suffolk Coastal parliamentary constituency. The county councillor is the Liberal Democrat Ruth Leach.

In 1894 Woodbridge became an urban district which became part of the administrative county of East Suffolk in 1889, the district contained the parish of Woodbridge. On 1 April 1974 the district was abolished and became part of Suffolk Coastal in the non-metropolitan county of Suffolk. A successor parish was formed covering the same area as the former district and its parish. In 2019 Woodbridge became part of East Suffolk district.

== Education and the arts ==
The town has state and grant-aided primary and secondary education at Farlingaye High School, Woodbridge Primary School, Kyson Primary School, and St Mary's Church of England Voluntarily Aided Primary School. The co-educational independent Woodbridge School has junior and senior departments and facilities for boarding.

Woodbridge has a community brass band, the Excelsior, formed in 1846, which makes it the oldest in East Anglia. There is a local radio station. The town also has a two-hectare (5-acre) walled park. Also of interest ecologically are the Quaker Burial Ground and Fen Meadow, 2.67 hectares (6.6 acres) of traditionally managed grassland.

== Media ==
Local news and television programmes are provided by BBC East and ITV Anglia. Television signals are received from the Sudbury TV transmitter and the local relay transmitter.

Local radio stations are BBC Radio Suffolk, Heart East, Greatest Hits Radio Ipswich & Suffolk, Nation Radio Suffolk and Ipswich Community Radio, a community based station which broadcast from nearby Ipswich.

The town is served by the local newspaper, Ipswich Star.

== Sport and leisure ==
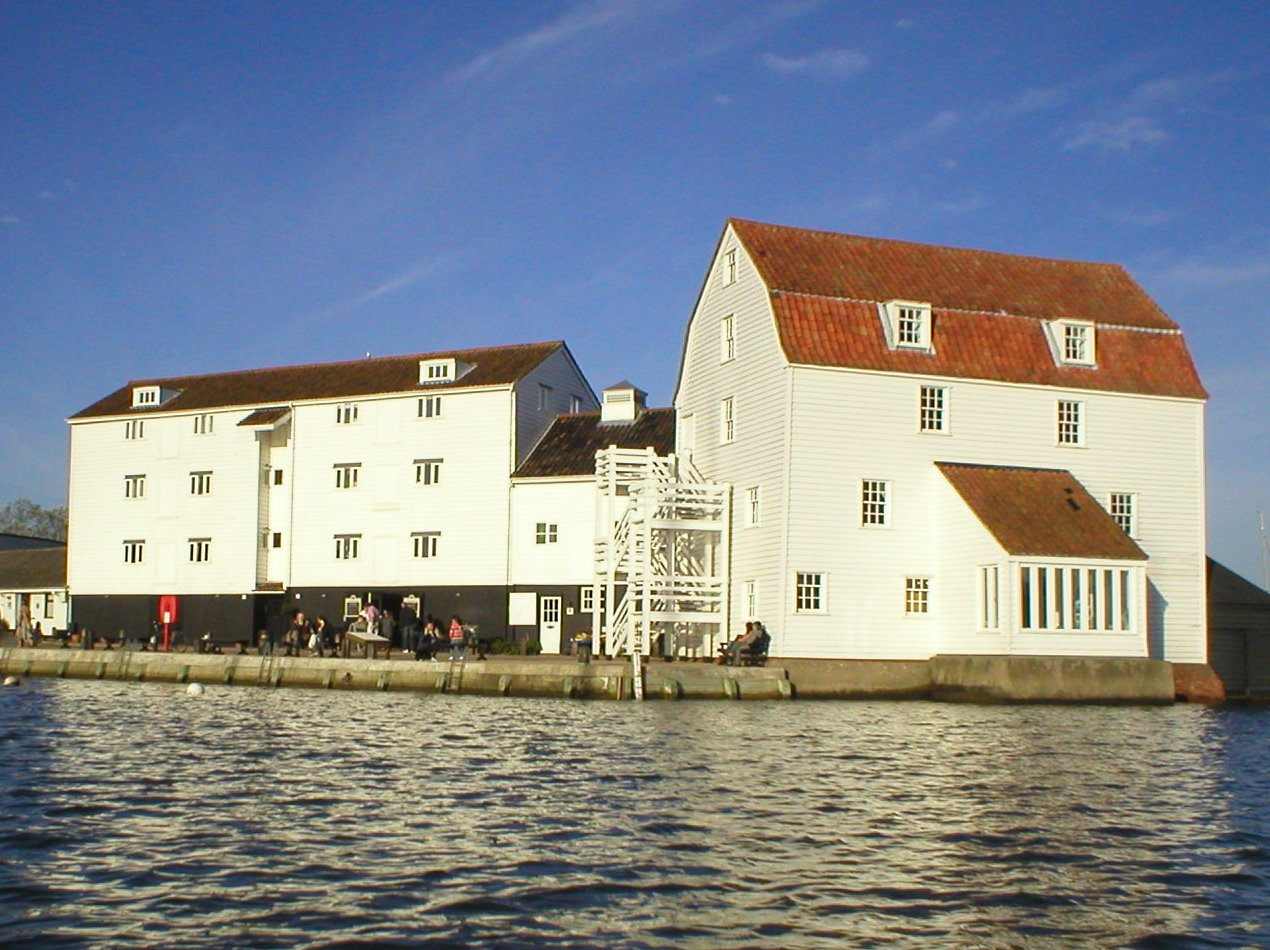
Woodbridge Tide Mill

Woodbridge has a Non-League football club Woodbridge Town F.C., which plays at Notcutts Park.

The many clubs and groups cover association football, badminton, birdwatching, bowls, cricket, cruising, netball, road running, rowing, rugby football, swimming, tennis, golf (Woodbridge Golf Club, founded 1893 at Bromeswell listed in the top 100 in England and Ufford Park), yachting and archery. They include Deben Rowing Club and Deben Yacht Club.

The town's Deben Leisure Centre and swimming pool were refurbished in 2017–2018 and now provide fuller services since reopening.

== Places of worship ==
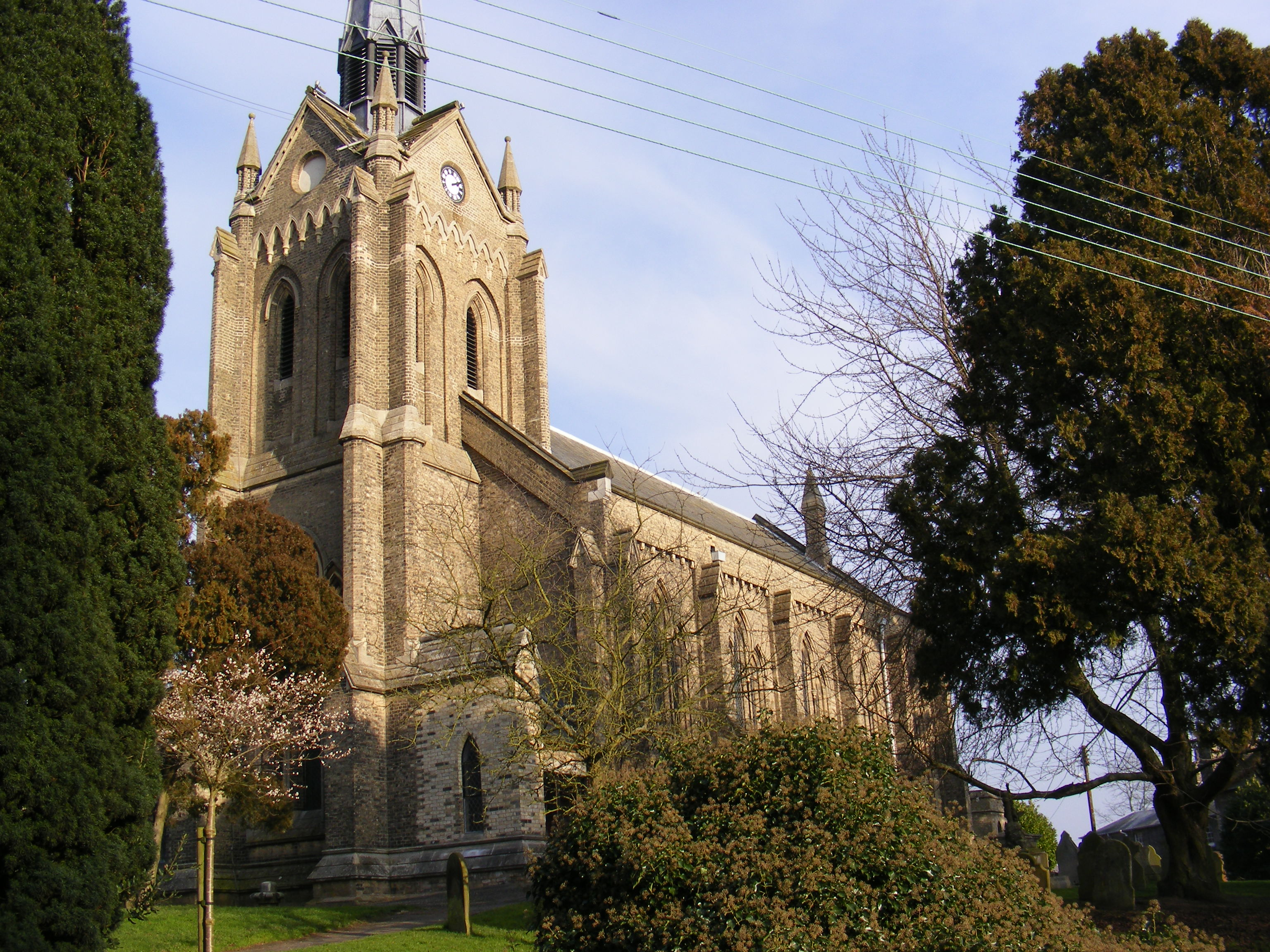
St John's Church, Woodbridge

The two Church of England churches are the medieval St Mary's on Market Hill, and the Victorian St John's on St John's Hill.

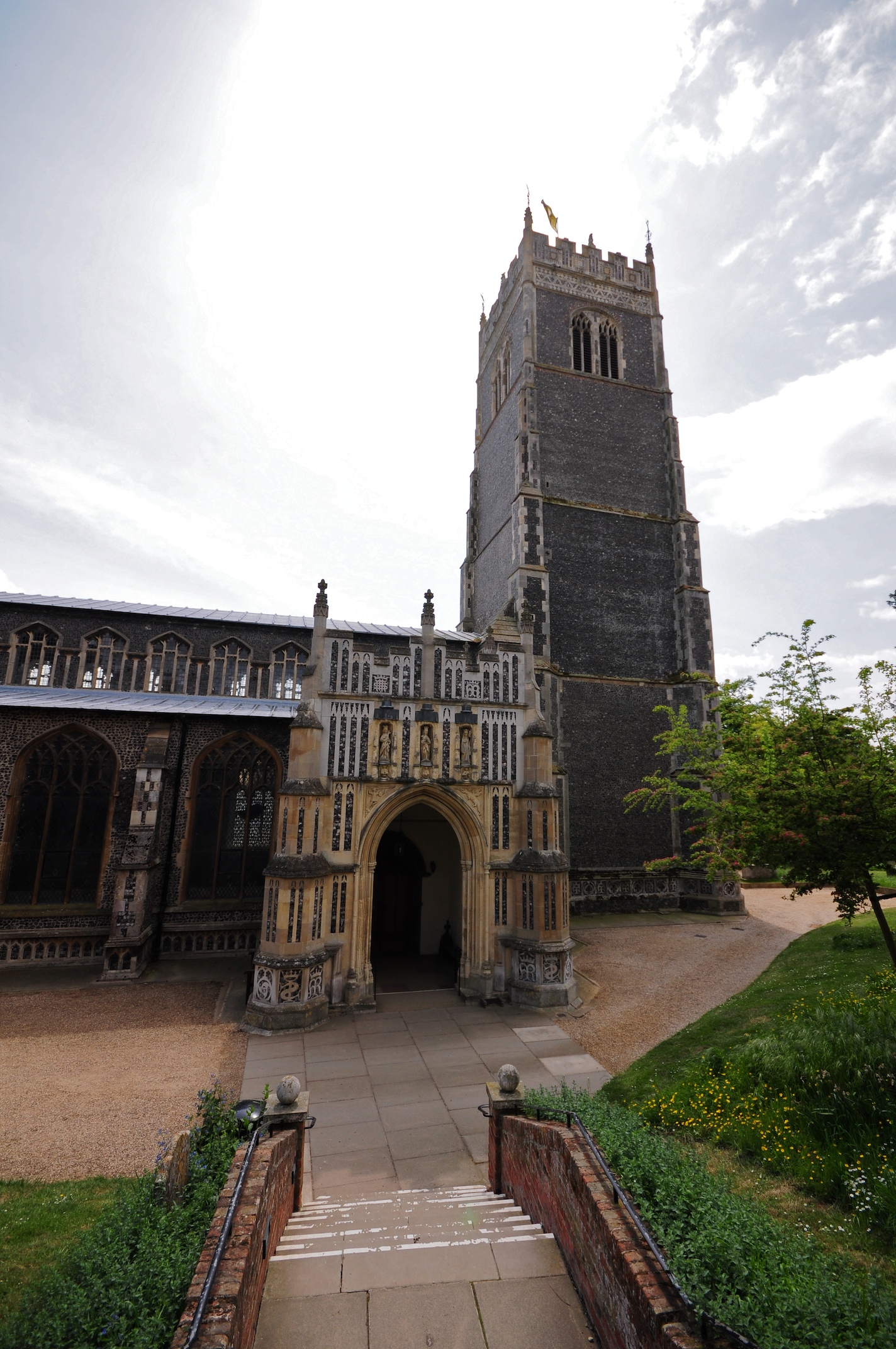
St Mary's Church, Woodbridge

Woodbridge Quay Church in Quay Street, once the Quay Meeting House, embodies a 2006 merger of the town's Baptist and United Reformed congregations. It is affiliated to the Baptist Union of Great Britain and the Evangelical Alliance. There is a Methodist Church in St John's Street, a Salvation Army hall in New Street, and the Roman Catholic Church of St Thomas of Canterbury in St John's Street. The last forms a joint parish with Framlingham. Woodbridge Quaker Meeting meets weekly at Woodbridge Shire Hall. Avenue Evangelical Church, on the outskirts of Woodbridge, is affiliated to the Fellowship of Independent Evangelical Churches.

== Climate ==
Woodbridge has an unusually warm summer climate, according to the averages for 1991–2020, and is exceptionally dry by British standards.

Climate data for RAF Bentwaters 26m amsl (1991–2020)
Month	Jan	Feb	Mar	Apr	May	Jun	Jul	Aug	Sep	Oct	Nov	Dec	Year
Mean daily maximum °C (°F)	7.8 (46.0)	5.8 (42.4)	10.2 (50.4)	11.2 (52.2)	15.3 (59.5)	17.7 (63.9)	21.5 (70.7)	22.6 (72.7)	19.3 (66.7)	12.9 (55.2)	10.6 (51.1)	7.3 (45.1)	13.5 (56.3)
Daily mean °C (°F)	6.0 (42.8)	4.0 (39.2)	7.7 (45.9)	8.3 (46.9)	12.2 (54.0)	14.4 (57.9)	18.4 (65.1)	19.1 (66.4)	15.9 (60.6)	10.5 (50.9)	8.3 (46.9)	5.4 (41.7)	10.9 (51.5)
Mean daily minimum °C (°F)	4.1 (39.4)	2.2 (36.0)	5.2 (41.4)	5.3 (41.5)	9.1 (48.4)	11.1 (52.0)	15.4 (59.7)	15.5 (59.9)	12.5 (54.5)	8.0 (46.4)	6.1 (43.0)	3.4 (38.1)	8.2 (46.7)
Average rainfall mm (inches)	43.7 (1.72)	46.4 (1.83)	36.9 (1.45)	39.4 (1.55)	48.0 (1.89)	45.8 (1.80)	23.1 (0.91)	15.2 (0.60)	61.3 (2.41)	20.1 (0.79)	65.5 (2.58)	38.3 (1.51)	483.7 (19.04)
Average rainy days (≥ 1.0 mm)	8.6	8.4	9.3	8.6	6.8	10.6	5.4	5.0	5.5	10.1	13.5	8.3	100.1
Source: Meteoclimat

== Notable residents ==
The astronomer John Brinkley and writers Edward FitzGerald and Anne Knight were born in Woodbridge, and fellow writer Bernard Barton lived in the town in later life.

Other residents of note include musician Nate James; actors Brian Capron and Nicholas Pandolfi; painter Thomas Churchyard; Director-General of the BBC Ian Jacob; abolitionist John Clarkson; Roy Keane the football manager, and Thomas Seckford, official at the court of Queen Elizabeth I. The clockmaker John Calver lived in the town. Musicians Brian Eno, Charlie Simpson and Brinsley Schwarz were born there. The world's most tattooed man, Tom Leppard, was born in the town. So were the actor Gavin Lee and the footballer Vernon Lewis.

The composer Christopher Wright (1954–2024) and his wife, violinist Ruth Dickins (1958–2009), lived in Woodbridge.

== Twin towns ==
Woodbridge has been twinned since 1973 with Mussidan, a town in the Dordogne in south-west France.

== Freedom of the Town ==
The following people and military units have received the Freedom of the Town of Woodbridge.

=== Military units ===
- 23 Parachute Engineer Regiment: 2006
- The Royal Air Force: 11 June 2016
- The Royal British Legion (Woodbridge Branch): 11 June 2016

== See also ==
- Deben Registration District
