= Sunday Times Fast Track 100 =

Sunday Times Fast Track 100 logo

The Sunday Times Fast Track 100 was an annual league table published in association with The Sunday Times newspaper in the UK. It ranks Britain's 100 private companies with the fastest-growing sales over the last three years. It is published in The Sunday Times each December, with a conference and awards event typically held in May, and alumni dinners during the year. The list is researched and produced by Fast Track, an Oxford-based research and networking events business. Sir Richard Branson and the Virgin Group have supported the Fast Track 100 league table since Hamish Stevenson founded Fast Track in 1997.

== About Fast Track ==
Fast Track was a research and events company that built a network of the UK's top-performing private companies, from the fastest-growing to the biggest, through its rankings in The Sunday Times. Founded in 1997 by Hamish Stevenson, it eventually published seven annual league tables and brought company founders and directors together at invitation-only networking awards events and alumni dinners.

The company ceased business operations in 2022 as a result of the pandemic, which made its business model unviable.

== Entry criteria ==
Companies have to meet the criteria below to be able to enter the Fast Track 100 league table:

- UK registered, unquoted, and not subsidiary
- Sales of at least £250,000 in the base year of trading (latest year minus 3 years)
- Sales of at least £5m in the latest year
- Ten or more employees in the latest year
- Operating profit of at least £500,00 in the latest year
- Year-on-year sales growth in the latest year
- Trading weeks in the base and latest years have to exceed 25
- Recruitment firms, payroll services providers, energy firms and media agencies are required to have gross profits of at least £5m. Sales for recruitment and payroll firms are the total amount invoiced to clients; media agencies' sales are net of advertising spend on behalf of clients

Companies that do not meet all the criteria can still be considered for the Ones to Watch programme,~~y~~ particularly if they forecast good sales growth.

Exclusions

- Technology, digital media and telecoms (TMT) companies (which appear on Tech Track 100)
- LLPs, pure property and financial trading companies, and companies with sales of over £500m

== Limitations ==
The Fast Track 100 league table is promoted as the definitive guide to the fastest growing privately held companies in the UK, with Richard Branson describing it as "the barometer of private company growth" However, the research limitations - most small private companies do not file accounts - mean that the list may not cover all fast growing private companies.

Sales figures filed in accounts with Companies House also reflect a trading period ending up to ten months prior to filing. The majority of sales figures published in Fast Track 100 are more up to date than that. For instance, on the 2019 Fast Track 100 league table, 65 companies supplied Fast Track with a sales figure for their latest year of trading that was not available at Companies House; 35 companies had filed accounts, but in many instances their prior years' trading figures were not publicly available, making it impossible to calculate their sales growth over a number of years.

== Notable alumni companies ==
Fast Track 100 is responsible for the early identification of a number of household names, including Carphone Warehouse, Boden and Travelex, innocent and Fever-Tree. The first Fast Track 100 league table in 1997 featured ARM Holdings with sales of just £17 million. It was sold to SoftBank for in 2016 for £24.4 billion.

More recently Fast Track 100 has tracked the progress of a new generation of private companies such as craft brewer Brewdog, beauty products retailer Charlotte Tilbury, and gym group PureGym.

== Latest Fast Track 100 list ==
The 24th annual Sunday Times Virgin Atlantic Fast Track 100 league table supplement was published on 6 December 2020 and featured companies such as BrewDog, reusable bottle brand Chilly's Bottles, fitness clothing retailer Gymshark, online jewellery brand Missoma and designer menswear retailer END.

=== 2019 Top 100 rankings ===
Rank	Company	Activity	Location	Year end	Annual sales rise over 3 years	Latest sales £000s	Staff	Year founded
1	Chilly's Bottles%	*9,241	16	2006				
4	Performance54	Golf marketing agency	Surrey	Apr-19	181.13%	*6,190	16	2015
5	Xpress Centres	Car repair services	Banbury	Jul-19	178.24%	*5,633	65	2014
6	Missoma	Online jewellery brand	West London	Mar-19	165.91%	*11,991	43	2008
7	Ooni	Pizza oven manufacturer	Edinburgh	Dec-18	148.13%	*9,987	28	2012
8	Evergen Group	Solar panel installer	Maidenhead	May-19	142.97%	*9,299	25	2011
9	Childs Farm	Children's toiletries maker	Hampshire	Dec-18	142.72%	12,818	28	2010
10	Gymshark	Fitness clothing retailer	Solihull	Jul-19	141.26%	*179,546	300	2012
11	One Retail Group	Consumer products retailer	Northwest London	Dec-18	136.64%	25,420	11	2013
12	Warner's Distillery	Gin distillery	Northamptonshire	Dec-18	131.13%	*10,859	34	2012
13	Oh Polly	Online fashion retailer	Glasgow	Apr-19	124.07%	*21,380	168	2015
14	Prodigi Group	Digital printing	Cardiff	Mar-19	123.55%	17,861	80	2014
15	Bluefin Trading	Sports equipment supplier	West Yorkshire	Dec-18	121.81%	†*6,672	10	2013
16	Strathberry	Luxury handbag designer	Edinburgh	Apr-19	118.07%	*11,825	40	2012
17	Missy Empire	Online fashion retailer	Manchester	Mar-19	115.30%	*13,864	45	2014
18	Brisant Secure	Lock and hinge manufacturer	West Yorkshire	Dec-18	111.27%	*8,783	40	2011
19	Sleek Events	Events agency	Southwest London	Jul-19	110.00%	*7,676	10	2015
20	CField Construction	Construction contractor	Central London	Dec-18	98.66%	67,545	55	2011
21	Otto Car	Car-hire provider	West London	Mar-19	97.08%	*12,078	50	2013
22	Boxpark	Retail and leisure developer	Brighton	Apr-19	96.02%	*12,800	110	2010
23	Improveasy	Energy efficiency consultancy	Manchester	Mar-19	95.96%	*11,928	23	2011
24	Candour Logistics	Logistics services provider	Warrington	Mar-19	93.07%	*56,437	17	2015
25	Northern Gas & Power	Energy management consultancy	Gateshead	Dec-18	92.85%	29,616	285	2013
26	Vashi	Diamond jewellery retailer	Central London	Dec-18	90.95%	20,666	55	2007
27	Lusso Stone	Luxury bathroom retailer	Middlesbrough	Sep-19	89.70%	*12,563	12	2014
28	Cult Beauty	Online beauty retailer	Central London	May-19	86.95%	*89,000	140	2008
29	Tarquin's Cornish Gin	Gin distillery	Cornwall	Mar-19	85.30%	*5,103	27	2012
30	Velocity Commerce	Online marketplace specialist	Cambridge	Dec-18	83.87%	*16,744	26	2013
31	Super 8 Restaurants	Restaurant group	East London	Jul-19	83.19%	*7,214	114	2014
32	Stiltz Lifts	Home lift manufacturer	West Midlands	Dec-18	81.66%	18,991	162	2010
33	HalalBooking	Specialist online travel agency	Reading	Dec-18	81.13%	*17,632	49	2009
34	Midstream Lighting	Specialist lighting manufacturer	Southwest London	Jan-19	78.24%	5,044	14	2012
35	Revolution Beauty	Beauty products retailer	Kent	Dec-18	76.66%	112,621	180	2014
36	AerFin	Aircraft and spares services	Caerphilly	Dec-18	76.54%	84,365	101	2010
37	Real Wrap Co.	Food-to-go manufacturer	Bristol	Mar-19	76.53%	*9,077	171	2012
38	Eden Mill	Distillery and brewery	St Andrews	Mar-19	74.20%	*7,773	51	2012
39	Grenade	Sports nutrition brand	Solihull	Dec-18	72.78%	*44,169	48	2009
40	Phoenix Cellular	Mobile phone distributor	Crewe	Oct-19	72.28%	*56,000	65	2015
41	Sherbet London	Taxi fleet operator	North London	Dec-18	71.69%	6,571	30	2013
42	Character.com	Branded clothing retailer	Swansea	Jul-18	70.90%	*19,090	38	2009
43	Transmission	Marketing agency	East London	Dec-18	68.25%	*17,392	60	2013
44	Tropic Skincare	Beauty products manufacturer	Croydon	Jun-19	66.71%	*34,943	160	2011
45	Mowgli Street Food	Indian restaurant chain	Liverpool	Jul-19	66.05%	11,986	301	2014
46	Charlotte Tilbury Beauty	Beauty products retailer	West London	Dec-18	65.30%	145,437	878	2013
47	CP Hire	Construction equipment hire	Cardiff	May-19	64.90%	*12,719	90	2012
48	Tattu	Chinese restaurant chain	Manchester	Dec-18	63.97%	*8,673	170	2015
49	INSTAsmile	Dental veneer retailer	Merseyside	Sep-19	62.76%	*6,500	50	2012
50	Oxford Summer Courses	Educational course provider	Oxford	Sep-19	62.42%	*9,272	36	2010
51	Envisage Dental	Dental practice	Basingstoke	Mar-19	61.24%	*6,287	68	2014
52	VPZ	Vaping shop chain	Edinburgh	Dec-18	60.04%	26,397	226	2012
53	Highwood Group	Construction contractor and developer	Hampshire	Feb-19	59.85%	66,706	62	2003
54	Corley + Woolley	Fit-out contractor	Central London	Dec-18	58.82%	32,072	37	2012
55	Braidwater Group	Housebuilder	Derry	Mar-19	58.28%	34,904	65	2011
56	The Resin Mill	Surfacing resin wholesaler	West Yorkshire	Dec-18	56.76%	*7,520	13	2015
57	BrewDog	Brewery	Aberdeenshire	Dec-18	56.55%	171,619	1,247	2007
58	Beavertown Brewery	Brewery	North London	Mar-19	56.53%	*19,559	112	2011
59	Reassured	Life insurance broker	Basingstoke	Jan-19	56.31%	37,811	411	2009
60	Gravity Active Entertainment	Trampoline park operator	West Yorkshire	Dec-18	56.11%	9,797	302	2014
61	Twinkl	Educational resources provider	Sheffield	Apr-19	55.86%	*18,891	440	2010
62	Plimsoll Productions	TV show producer	Bristol	Aug-19	54.98%	*37,284	195	2013
63	Flat Iron	Steak restaurant chain	Central London	Aug-18	54.59%	14,477	234	2012
64	Task Consumer Products	Toilet paper manufacturer	Wolverhampton	Dec-18	54.08%	45,822	63	2007
65	Nurture Landscapes	Landscape maintenance	Surrey	Mar-19	53.05%	73,135	1,093	2008
66	Marine Products	Fish processor and supplier	Glasgow	Dec-18	52.98%	26,950	150	2002
67	END.	Designer menswear retailer	Newcastle upon Tyne	Mar-19	52.55%	134,658	464	2005
68	OMG How Cheap	Online stationery retailer	Colchester	Feb-19	52.21%	*7,127	32	2011
69	Needle & Thread	Womenswear designer	Northwest London	Mar-19	51.85%	13,576	74	2013
70	Green Park	Recruitment consultancy	Central London	Jan-19	51.50%	90,107	66	2006
71	Exceed	Well management and engineering	Aberdeen	Feb-19	51.28%	20,748	43	2005
72	VetCT	Veterinary radiology services	Cambridge	Jul-19	50.86%	*6,300	100	2009
73	Red Industries	Waste management provider	Newcastle-under-Lyme	Dec-18	50.51%	23,832	180	2006
74	ITD Global	International courier	Manchester	Apr-19	50.46%	*23,078	43	2004
75	Plantforce	Plant hire	Bristol	Sep-19	50.24%	*35,300	131	1999
76	Flame Heating Group	Heating and plumbing merchant	Tyne and Wear	Jun-19	49.98%	*20,087	70	2011
77	Intevi	Display and software supplier	Hampshire	Dec-18	49.71%	*5,538	24	2011
78	Rinkit	Online home and garden retailer	Chichester	Feb-19	49.49%	*17,090	45	2008
79	Munnelly Group	Construction/infrastructure logistics	Harrow	Mar-19	48.26%	81,163	523	1977
80	Oliver's Travels	Luxury travel website	South London	Sep-19	48.18%	*6,206	53	2008
81	BioPhorum	Biopharmaceutical forum organiser	Central London	Dec-18	47.49%	*6,707	10	2009
82	Pizza Pilgrims	Pizzeria operator	Central London	Jun-19	47.48%	*11,900	215	2012
83	Total Management Group	Events and travel agency	Central London	Mar-19	47.21%	*15,153	44	2006
84	Liforme	Yoga mat manufacturer & retailer	North London	Mar-19	46.89%	*6,022	15	2008
85	Prime Global	Medical communications agency	Knutsford	Dec-18	46.57%	19,176	156	1997
86	Clearabee	Waste collection services	Birmingham	Dec-18	46.53%	*12,212	179	2013
87	Spirit Healthcare	Healthcare products supplier	Leicester	Mar-19	46.41%	*14,318	66	2007
88	Aspens Services	Contract caterer	Worcestershire	Apr-19	46.40%	49,676	2,172	2008
89	BrandAlley	Online flash sales site	Central London	Dec-18	45.99%	45,840	72	2009
90	Identity	Events management agency	East Sussex	Aug-19	45.70%	*8,722	43	2001
91	Age Partnership	Equity release adviser	Leeds	Dec-18	45.45%	50,124	552	2004
92	The Alchemist	Bar and restaurant operator	Greater Manchester	Mar-19	45.08%	41,032	929	2009
93	Equifinance	Secured loans provider	East London	Aug-19	44.89%	*6,757	25	2010
94	United Gas & Power	Business energy supplier	Leeds	Jun-19	44.88%	*23,211	60	2013
95	Superyacht Tenders & Toys	Yacht equipment supplier	Ipswich	Oct-18	44.81%	*6,596	11	2011
96	Honest Burgers	Burger restaurant chain	Central London	Jan-19	44.58%	30,669	589	2011
97	Vanarama	Vehicle leasing broker	Hemel Hempstead	Dec-18	44.18%	*75,055	226	2007
98	Hamilton Court FX	Foreign exchange services	Central London	Mar-19	44.06%	*15,265	45	2011
99	Airline Component Services	Aircraft parts and repairs	Braintree	Mar-19	44.02%	*6,225	10	2005
100	Vivobarefoot	Footwear manufacturer & retailer	Central London	Jun-19	43.57%	*26,176	61	2012

== Previous rankings ==
=== 2018 Top 20 rankings ===
Ranking	Company name	Business Activity	Sales growth (% per annum over 3 years)
1	Midwinter Solutions	Clinical trials supplier	233.29%
2	Crep Protect	Footwear accessories developer	190.74%
3	Revolution Beauty	Beauty products retailer	152.92%
4	Missoma	Online jewellery brand	148.26%
5	Mission Mars	Bar and restaurant operator	147.37%
6	Warner Edwards	Gin distiller	142.58%
7	One Retail Group	Consumer products retailer	141.53%
8	AerFin	Aircraft and spares services	140.68%
9	AFC Bournemouth	Football club	138.23%
10	ISO Spaces	Modular buildings designer	135.38%
11	Velocity Outlet	Online electronics retailer	134.32%
12	Gymshark	Online sportswear retailer	127.86%
13	Cult Beauty	Online beauty retailer	125.88%
14	Ridgepoint Homes	Housebuilder and developer	124.72%
15	CField Construction	Building and civil engineering contractor	111.99%
16	INSTAsmile	Dental veneer retailer	109.45%
17	Mowgli Street Food	Indian restaurant chain	106.05%
18	Lusso Stone	Luxury bathroom retailer	105.41%
19	Brewhouse & Kitchen	Microbrewery and pub operator	103.82%
20	Oxford Summer Courses	Educational course provider	103.80%

=== 2017 Top 20 rankings ===
Ranking	Company Name	Business Activity	Sales growth (% per annum over 3 years)
1	AerFin	Aircraft and spares services	231.26%
2	P2 Consulting	Management consultancy	198.49%
3	TFS Healthcare	Healthcare recruitment consultancy	175.16%
4	Veezu	Taxi hire provider	157.03%
5	Plimsoll Productions	Television show producer	148.65%
6	All Good	Snack manufacturer	146.50%
7	Cult Beauty	Online beauty retailer	131.35%
8	Five Guys	Burger restaurant chain	129.29%
9	CarFinance247	Vehicle finance provider	120.84%
10	Loveholidays	Online travel agency	120.33%
11	Hackwood Homes	Property and land developer	115.44%
12	Gymshark	Online sportswear retailer	112.30%
13	Eccleston Homes	Housebuilder	110.64%
14	Radford Group	Construction contractor	108.91%
15	GreenTech Distribution	Mobile phone recycler and distributor	104.95%
16	Skinnydip	Fashion accessories retailer	104.03%
17	Corley + Woolley	Fit-out contractor	102.30%
18	WED2B	Wedding dress retailer	100.22%
19	Ennismore	Hotel developer and operator	99.08%
20	Pallet-Track	Logistics provider	94.99%

=== 2016 Abbreviated rankings ===
Ranking	Company Name	Business Activity	Sales growth (% per annum over 3 years)
1	Gymshark	Online activewear retailer	193.27%
2	Loveholidays	Online travel agency	183.90%
3	Chemist-4-U.com	Online Pharmacy	172.66%
4	Heck! Food	Gourmet sausage producer	170.13%
5	Carfinance247	Vehicle finance provider	161.01%
6	AerFin	Aircraft and spares services	158.34%
7	Acro Aircraft Seating	Aircraft seat manufacturer	156.55%
8	ESM Power	Electrical engineer	146.43%
9	GreenTech Distribution	Mobile phone recycler and distributor	143.84%
10	Ennismore	Hospitality developer and operator	141.64%
11	Globe Locums	Healthcare recruitment consultancy	140.92%
12	Pink Boutique	Online fashion retailer	138.84%
13	Transflex Vehicle Rental	Vehicle rental provider	134.39%
14	Tropic Skincare	Skincare manufacturer	131.32%
15	Wool Warehouse	Online yarn retailer	127.94%
16	Victorian Plumbing	Online bathroom retailer	116.63%
17	Athena PTS	Electrical engineer	115.47%
18	Green Frog Connect	Utilities connections provider	114.21%
19	Honest Burgers	Burger restaurant operator	110.69%
20	Lindy Bop	Vintage fashion designer	108.83%
21	A-2 Sea	Subsea telecoms supplier	106.43%
22	JDX	Business consultancy	105.16%

=== 2015 Abbreviated rankings ===
Ranking	Company Name	Business Activity	Sales growth (% per annum over 3 years)
1	GreenTech Distribution	Mobile phone recycler and distributor	248.40%
2	Honest Burgers	Burger restaurant operator	205.67%
3	Talon Outdoor	Media agency	194.71%
4	Heck! Food	Gourmet sausage producer	158.82%
5	Day Webster	Healthcare recruitment consultancy	155.62
6	Carfinance247	Vehicle finance provider	148.5%
7	Athena PTS	Electrical engineering services	126.33%
8	G2 Energy	Electrical and civil engineer	121.72%
9	PureGym	Gym operator	121.19%
10	The Car Finance Company	Vehicle finance provider	119.43%
11	Gtech	Domestic appliance manufacturer	117.45%
12	Missguided	Online fashion retailer	115.31%
15	Crystal Palace F.C.	Football club	107.18%
21	AlphaSights	Business information provider	94.32%
35	BrewDog	Brewery	71.04%
38	Southampton F.C.	Football club	70.55%
66	Ed's Easy Diner	Restaurant operator	57.1%
86	Graze.com	Online food retailer	48.19%
90	Byron	Restaurant operator	46.67%
92	Mint Velvet	Ladies' clothing retailer	45.35%
94	Rapha	Cycling apparel maker and retailer	44.38%
99	Watchfinder	Pre-owned watch retailer	42.9%

=== 2013 Abbreviated rankings ===
Ranking	Company Name	Business Activity	Sales growth (% per annum)
1	Anesco	Energy efficiency consultancy	267.16
2	Mobile Account Solutions	Phone and tablet provider	254.06
3	AlphaSights	Business information provider	229.25
4	Bishopsgate Financial	Management consultancy	228.72
5	Protection Vessels International	Maritime security provider	222.94
6	The Genuine Gemstone Company	Home shopping jewellery retailer	189.26
10	G2 Energy	Electrical and civil engineer	163.29
20	Stormfront	Apple products reseller	116.30
30	Actegy Health	Home healthcare devices	91.84
40	Loaf	Furniture retailer	80.92
50	Language Connect	Translation services provider	72.15
51	Oak Furniture Land	Hardwood furniture retailer	71.46
60	Centek	Oilfield equipment manufacturer	67.09
64	Trans Global Projects Group	project logistics management	65.37
70	Statesman Travel	Business travel agent	62.72
80	Marlin Financial Group	Debt purchaser	54.77
81	Cartridge Save	Computer consumables reseller	54.51
90	Igloo	Recruitment consultancy	52.08
95	Cubiquity	Design and print agency	51.24
96	SERS Energy Solutions	Energy services provider	51.18
97	Pearmain Pubs	Pub and restaurant operator	50.53
98	TopCashback	Cashback website operator	50.35
99	ID Medical	Recruitment consultancy	49.83
100	Baltic Training	Training services provider	49.64

=== 2012 Abbreviated rankings ===
Ranking	Company Name	Business Activity	Sales growth (% per annum)
1	Genuine Gemstone Company	Home shopping Jewellery retailer	245.36
2	Spabreaks.com	Spa booking service provider	198.31
3	Mobile Account Solutions	Mobile phone provider	198.01
4	AES International	Financial services provider	187.46
5	Solfex	Renewable energy products supplier	178.80
6	Drake & Morgan	Bar and restaurant operator	171.50
7	Jamie's Italian	Restaurant operator	168.10
8	Gaia Wind	Wind turbine manufacturer	167.85
9	Stormfront	Apple products reseller	166.57
10	Lenstore.co.uk	Online contact lens retailer	159.15
15	Alternergy	Solar energy products distributor	136.91
20	First Utility	Energy supplier	112.01
22	World of Books	Books and media entertainment reseller	107.30
25	Consol Partners	IT recruitment consultancy	101.15
30	Hallam Medical	Medical recruitment consultancy	94.33
33	Better Bathrooms	Bathroom products and tiles retailer	92.46
35	TopCashback	Cashback website operator	89.81
40	Fideliti	Childcare voucher administrator	79.21
45	Be Wiser Insurance	Insurance broker	76.96
50	Oliver James Associates	Recruitment consultancy	73.46
55	Assured Recruitment	Recruitment consultancy	68.73
60	Automotive Trim Developments	Leather seating and trim manufacturer	67.27
65	Specialty Powders	Food manufacturer	65.64
67	Cartridge Save	Computer consumables reseller	64.76
70	Blue Group	Industrial machinery distributor	63.72
75	MPM Products	Pet food producer	61.39
80	The Eventa Group	Events organiser	58.73
85	Austin Fraser	Recruitment consultancy	55.19
90	Wiggle	Online sports goods retailer	52.94
95	Sofa.com	Online sofa retailer	51.42
100	Chain Reaction Cycles	Online bike retailer	49.72

=== 2011 Abbreviated rankings ===
Ranking	Company Name	Business Activity	Sales growth (% per annum)
1	Clinigen Group	Pharmaceutical services provider	242.05
2	Secured Mail	Bulk mail service provider	232.76
3	Diet Chef	Diet meal retailer	228.69
4	Mobile Account Solutions	Mobile phone provider	194.45
5	TopCashback	Cashback website operator	189.27
6	Medstrom	NHS product supplier	166.72
7	Côte Restaurants	Restaurant operator	166.35
8	Veetee Foods	Pre-packaged food manufacturer	163.83
9	Notonthehighstreet.com	Online retail marketplace	154.65
10	Lois Jewellery	Jewellery wholesaler & bullion dealer	150.13
20	Baird & Co	Bullion merchant	115.27
30	Surfdome.com	Online lifestyle retailer	92.11
40	MPM products	Natural pet food producer	78.15
50	Low Cost Travel Group	Travel operator	69.79
60	Euro Communications Distribution	Telecoms reseller	63.58
61	Cartridge Save	Computer consumables reseller	61.65
70	Buymobilephones.net	Online phone retailer	57.69
80	GO Outdoors	Outdoor equipment retailer	53.86
90	Goodman Associates	Media and advertising agency	51.78
94	Oak Furniture Land	Hardwood furniture retailer	51.08
100	Calcot Health & Leisure	Hotel and spa operator	49.64

=== 2010 Abbreviated rankings ===
Ranking	Company Name	Business Activity	Sales growth (% per annum)
1	Buymobilephones.net	Mobile phone retailer	340.15
2	Subocean Group	Subsea construction provider	237.14
3	VADition	Hardware/software distributor	195.77
4	High Tech Health	Health product marketer	193.81
5	Planet Cruise	Cruise and tour holidays operator	181.97
6	Your Golf Travel	Golf travel agency	158.06
7	Pathology Group	Healthcare recruitment consultancy	151.89
8	Staysure.co.uk	Over 50s insurance provider	151.17
9	State Oil	Fuel wholesaler	144.08
10	powerPerfector	Energy-saving device distributor	140.01
11	ADEY Heating Solutions	Heating filter manufacturer	138.66
12	Badger Office Supplies	Office products supplier	133.34
13	Global Personals	Online dating agency	133.18
14	Ella's Kitchen	Baby food producer	129.22
15	Team24	Medical recruitment consultancy	125.54
16	SDK Jewellers	Online watch retailer	122.93
17	Moonpig.com	Online greeting card retailer	115.51
18	Directline holidays	Online travel operator	113.50
19	Green Park Interim and Executive	Recruitment consultancy	112.62
20	Liz Hobbs Group	Events producer	108.13
21	BullionVault.com	Gold dealer	105.87
22	SFC (Wholesale)	Fried chicken wholesaler	104.86
23	TorFX	Foreign exchange provider	103.01
24	UK Flooring Direct	Online flooring retailer	101.06
25	Miroma	Media barter company	95.55
26	Ramsdens	Pawnbroker and jeweller	94.42
27	International Applications	Industrial and consumer goods distributor	91.15
28	LNT Group	Care home developer	90.93
29	Fjord	Digital design consultancy	89.50
30	ONEPOST	Postal management adviser	89.22
31	Ship Shape Resources	Construction services provider	89.21
32	MPM products	Natural pet food producer	87.47
33	Lifetime	Training provider	84.67
34	Oak Furniture Land	Hardwood furniture retailer	84.61
35	Natural Products	Giftware designer	83.51
40	LOC Consulting	Management Consultancy	77.05
73	jjFOX	Recruitment Consultancy	
77	Direct Traveller	Travel Company	54.00

=== 2009 Abbreviated rankings ===
Ranking	Company Name	Business Activity	HQ Location
1	Cyclescheme	Cycle to Work scheme administrator	Bath, UK
2	Gio-Goi	Fashion wholesaler	
3	Empiric Solutions	Recruitment consultancy	
4	Oxygen	Insurance broker	
5	Eazyfone	Mobile phone recycler	
6	Mattressman	Mattress retailer	
7	I-Paye	Payroll services provider	
8	Paladin Group	Property services provider	
9	Ella's Kitchen	Baby food producer	
10	Catering Academy	Contract catering provider	
37	jjFOX	Recruitment Consultancy	

Other awards
Award	Company Name	Business Activity	HQ Location
Ones to Recognise	Brompton Bicycle	Folding bicycles	London, UK

=== 2008 Abbreviated rankings ===
Ranking	Company Name	Business Activity	HQ Location
1	Hotel Chocolat	Retail	
2	TorFX	Foreign Currency Exchange	
3	Silver Cross	Pram Maker	
4	jjFOX	Recruitment Consultancy	
5	The Book Depository	Online book retailer	
6	Burgopak	Packaging Design	
7	Paladin Group	Property Services	
8	Manpower Direct	Security Services	
9	Medicare First	Recruitment Consultancy	
10	Probuild Birmingham	Construction - Shopfitter	
11	TDX Group	Debt Management	Nottingham
12	Allen Lane	Recruitment Consultant	
13	Interim Partners	Recruitment Consultancy	
14	CSG	Business Finance	
15	Practicus	Interim Management Recruitment	Henley-on-Thames
16	On Holiday Group	Holiday Broker	
17	Towry Law	Financial Services	
18	Mayday Healthcare	Healthcare services	
19	Hobson Prior	Recruitment Consultancy	
20	First Point Group	Recruitment Consultancy	
36	innocent	Fruit Drinks maker	
65	Net-a-Porter	Online Retailer	

=== 2007 Abbreviated rankings ===
Ranking	Company Name
1	Travel Republic
2	Ocean Team
3	Police Recruit
4	AJ Power Limited
5	Oliver Marketing
6	Simply Business
7	Flat TV Company
8	4L's Packing
9	Head Resourcing
10	Investigo
12	Silver Cross
18	Paladin Group
36	Widget UK
37	Dolphin Music
40	innocent Drinks
41	Astbury Marsden
42	Feel Good Drinks Co
49	Gü
51	WFCA Plc
59	Towergate Partnership
63	Barchester Healthcare
65	Maria Mallaband Care Group
69	Card Factory
71	Visioncall
83	Pharmalink Consulting
84	Tyrrells
92	Riverford
99	Liv-ex

== Other Fast Track publications ==
Fast Track 100 is one of seven league tables of private companies produced by Fast Track and published in The Sunday Times:

- Fast Track 100 – ranks the UK's fastest-growing private companies based on sales (excluding TMT companies, which appear in Tech Track 100 (see below)
- SME Export Track 100 – ranks the UK's SMEs with the fastest-growing international sales
- Tech Track 100 – ranks the UK's fastest-growing private technology companies based on sales (the sister table to Fast Track 100)
- International Track 200 – ranks the UK's private mid-market companies with the fastest-growing overseas sales
- Profit Track 100 – ranks the UK's private companies with the fastest-growing profits
- Top Track 250 – ranks the UK's leading mid-market private companies based on sales and/or profits growth
- Top Track 100 – ranks the UK's biggest private companies based on sales
