= Bluebella =

British lingerie company

Blue Bella Ltd
- Trade name: Bluebella
- Type: Private
- Industry: LingerieRetail
- Founded: 2005
- Founder: Emily Bendell
- Headquarters: Brickfields, Unit 201, 37 Cremer Street, London, England
- Key people: Emily Bendell
- Net income: ▲£14.8 million (2022)
- Total assets: ▲£4.5 million (2022)
- Website: http://www.bluebella.com

Bluebella is a British lingerie company founded in 2005 by Emily Bendell, with operations in the UK, US, Australia, France and Italy. It is headquartered in London, United Kingdom.

Early investors included James Averdieck, founder of Gü, the investor network Incito Ventures and the South East Seed Fund. Bluebella was the first company to get funds from the London-based female investor club Addidi Business Angels.

The business experienced rapid growth, doubling turnover every 12 months from 2007 to 2010.

== History ==
Company founder Emily Bendell studied philosophy, politics and economics at Magdalen College, Oxford, and worked as a journalist on a legal journal for a few years, before founding Bluebella in 2005.

Bendell road-tested her idea for six months, doing parties for friends and family members. She told Jazz FM's Elliot Moss: "It was just me in my bedroom initially. I'd go out and do the orders, then I’d do all the packing and, if someone called, I'd answer the phones too."

In an interview with the fashion industry trade magazine Drapers, Bendell explained how she overcame sexism to secure investment from well-connected female investors. "There is an issue in this country, particularly with female-focused businesses, because the investment community is very male dominated. Before crowd-funding, we had previously been through some angel investor rounds. The business angel community is 95% male and typically invest in businesses they understand and have experience of. After one early round of funding, I was quite disillusioned and just put on an event myself, cold-calling high-net worth women asking them to come along."

By 2008, Bluebella had 100 agents operating across the UK. Other online retailers, including ASOS and Figleaves, began stocking Bluebella's lingerie range.

In February 2014, the department store Selfridges announced that it would be stocking Bluebella lingerie. For 2014, sales tripled to £3.7 million, with a profit of £347,000 against a £430,300 loss the previous year, boosted by Tesco selling their Fifty Shades range.

The company raised over £1m in a crowd-fund in December 2016 to expand into the US. By summer 2018 they were stocked in Bloomingdale's and Nordstrom department stores and online retailers Revolve and ShopBop. They had media coverage, with actress Maggie Gyllenhaal and singer Nicki Minaj wearing their lingerie in photo shoots.

In 2016, Bluebella worked with three GB Olympic athletes on a body confidence campaign, #BeStrongBeBeautiful, to get more schoolgirls into sport and fitness. The company launched the campaign, as statistics showed that more than half of secondary school girls drop out of sport after the age of 13 because of body issues and negative experiences of PE lessons. Windsurfer Bryony Shaw, shooter Amber Hill and Paralympic long-jumper Stefanie Reid did a shoot in Bluebella lingerie and discussed their body confidence issues growing up to try to encourage girls to do more sport and fitness activities.

In July 2018, the company formed a swimwear design collaboration with Amber Davies, winner of reality TV series Love Island Series 3

In 2019, they formed a wholesale partnership with Victoria's Secret, with Bluebella's autumn 19 collection being stocked in selected stores and online. For the month of March 2020, the company donated £1 from every purchase to social enterprise Beam.org, to crowdfund job training for homeless women.

== Recognition and awards ==
Bendell has been invited to receptions at Buckingham Palace and 10 Downing Street. In 2012, she became one of a dozen ambassadors for the government's newly-formed start-up loans company, which provided mentor-supported loans to young people looking to start their own businesses. The scheme, which also involved Dragon's Den investor James Caan, was promoted by Bendell alongside other young entrepreneurs such as James Eder (The Beans Group) and Romy Lewis (Lola's Kitchen). In 2014, Bendell was included in the Management Today "35 under 35" list of the UK's most successful young women entrepreneurs.

In 2017 and 2018, Bluebella won Drapers "Lingerie Brand of the Year" award. In 2018, they won Marketing Campaign of the Year at the UK Lingerie Awards 2018 for their "Dare To Bare" campaign launch for September 2017's London Fashion Week, in which 19 non-professional models did an outdoor catwalk show at Oxford Circus.
