= Sunseeker =

British luxury motor yacht brand

Sunseeker International
- Company type: Subsidiary
- Industry: Luxury motor yachts
- Founder: Robert Braithwaite; John Braithwaite
- Headquarters: Poole, England
- Key people: Andrea Frabetti (CEO)
- Revenue: £320 million (2013)
- Owner: Lionheart Capital and Orienta Capital Partners
- Number of employees: Approximately 2,600 (2019)
- Website: www.sunseeker.com

Sunseeker International is a British luxury performance motor yacht brand. Originally named Poole Power Boats, the company was founded by brothers Robert and John Braithwaite in 1969. The company changed its name to Sunseeker International in 1985 and has since become a global icon. Its headquarters and main assembly facility is in Poole Harbour, at Poole in Dorset, England. The majority shareholder has been Wanda Group since 2013. It is the largest UK-based luxury yacht maker measured by 2012 revenues.

== Profile ==
=== Corporate information ===
The main operating company (Sunseeker International Limited, company number 00675320) has its registered office at Sunseeker House, West Quay Road, Poole, Dorset, BH15 1JD. Sunseeker describes the nature of its business using the Standard Industrial Classification number 30110: 'Building of ships and floating structures'.

A holding company, Sunseeker International (Holdings) Limited, was founded in 2006 using an off-the-shelf company. There are other companies in the group, including specialist entities for chartering and mouldings manufacturing.

Debt financing is provided to the group by HSBC Bank plc through a revolving credit facility agreement originally dated 8 July 2015, as subsequently amended and restated, pursuant to which the group has mortgaged and charged various assets, including (inter alios) its shipyards, intellectual property, and goodwill.

=== Industrial profile ===
Manufacturing is undertaken mainly in Poole, in eight production plants and shipyards where it employs c. 2,600 people and produces around 150 boats every year ranging from 38 to 161 feet. An additional deep-water shipyard in Hythe, Hampshire is used to build the 105 yacht and larger vessels. In March 2007, the company announced a 500 job expansion programme, with a new site on the Isle of Portland.

Poole is also home to Sunseeker's dedicated Design & Technology Centre, a unique facility which vertically integrates every detail of the yachts from the initial concept designs through to the finishing details including furniture, complex electrical systems, helm consoles and soft furnishings, thereby maintaining quality control and craftmanship standards.

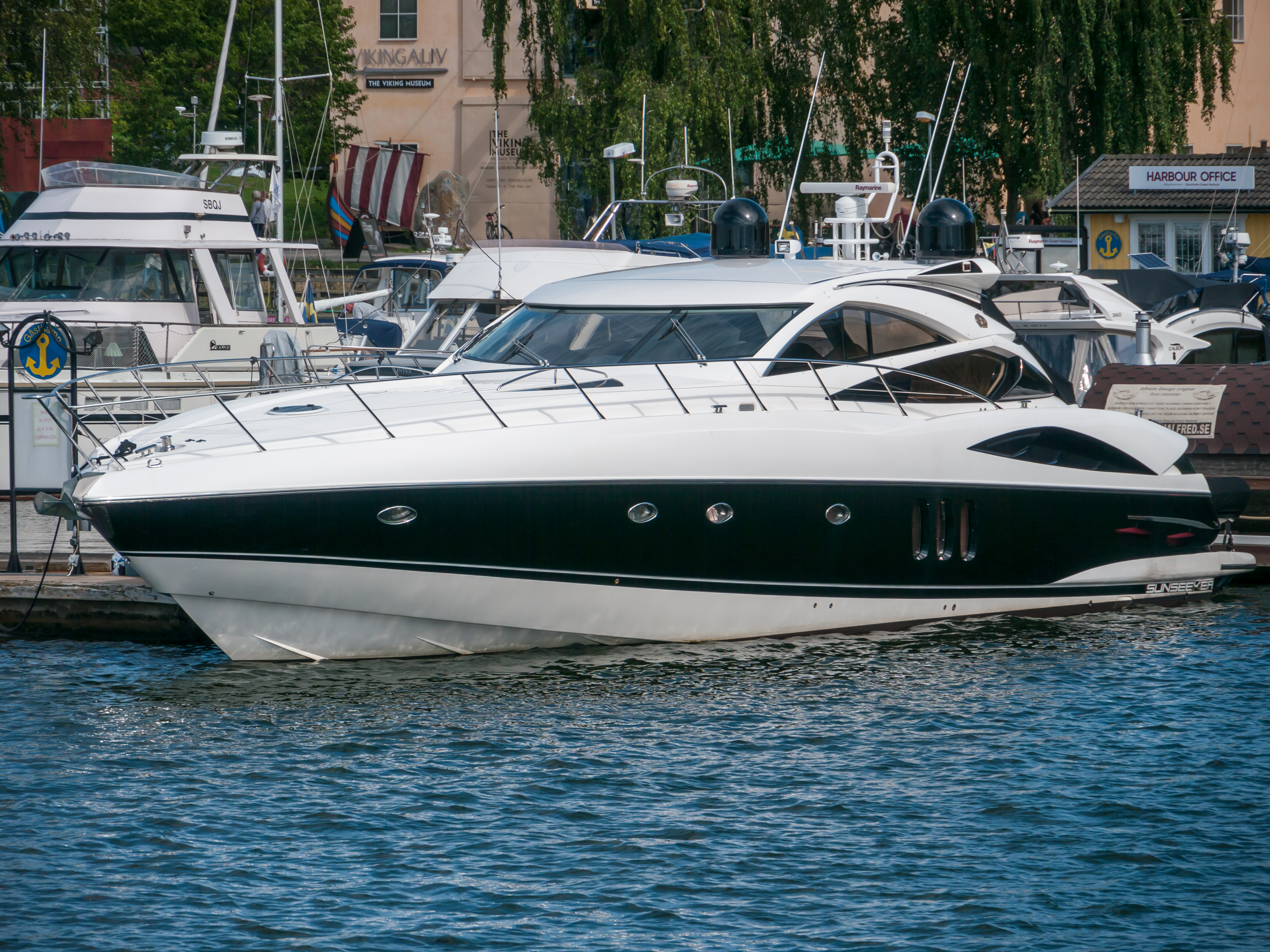
Sunseeker in Stockholm, Sweden.

=== History ===
In October 2002, Robert Braithwaite, the founder of Sunseeker International, was named Ernst & Young's UK Entrepreneur of the Year.

In 2006 Robert Braithwaite led a £44 million management buyout of the company, backed by Bank of Scotland.

The company features in the 2008 Sunday Times list Profit Track 100 of the most profitable non-listed companies and in the Top Track 250 list of mid-sized non-listed companies.

In 2010, Irish private equity firm FL Partners took over ownership of Sunseeker through a debt restructuring deal after Sunseeker posted losses the previous year.

On 19 June 2013 it was announced that the Chinese conglomerate Dalian Wanda Group had agreed to buy a 91.8% stake in Sunseeker for £320M. As reported, it has been promised that the day-to-day running of Sunseeker in Poole will be unaffected, with its 2,500-strong workforce keeping their jobs. The deal was completed mid August 2013.

In January 2015, Phil Popham was appointed as the company's new chief executive officer.

In June 2019, Sunseeker announced that Andrea Frabetti, formerly Chief Technical Officer at Sunseeker, replaced Christian Marti as CEO. Prior to his time at Sunseeker, Frabetti worked at Italian superyacht manufacturer Ferretti Group for over 25 years, including time as vice president of product development, as well as at Diesel Center SPA as CEO. Marti came on board as Sunseeker's CEO in November 2018 following the departure of Phil Popham.

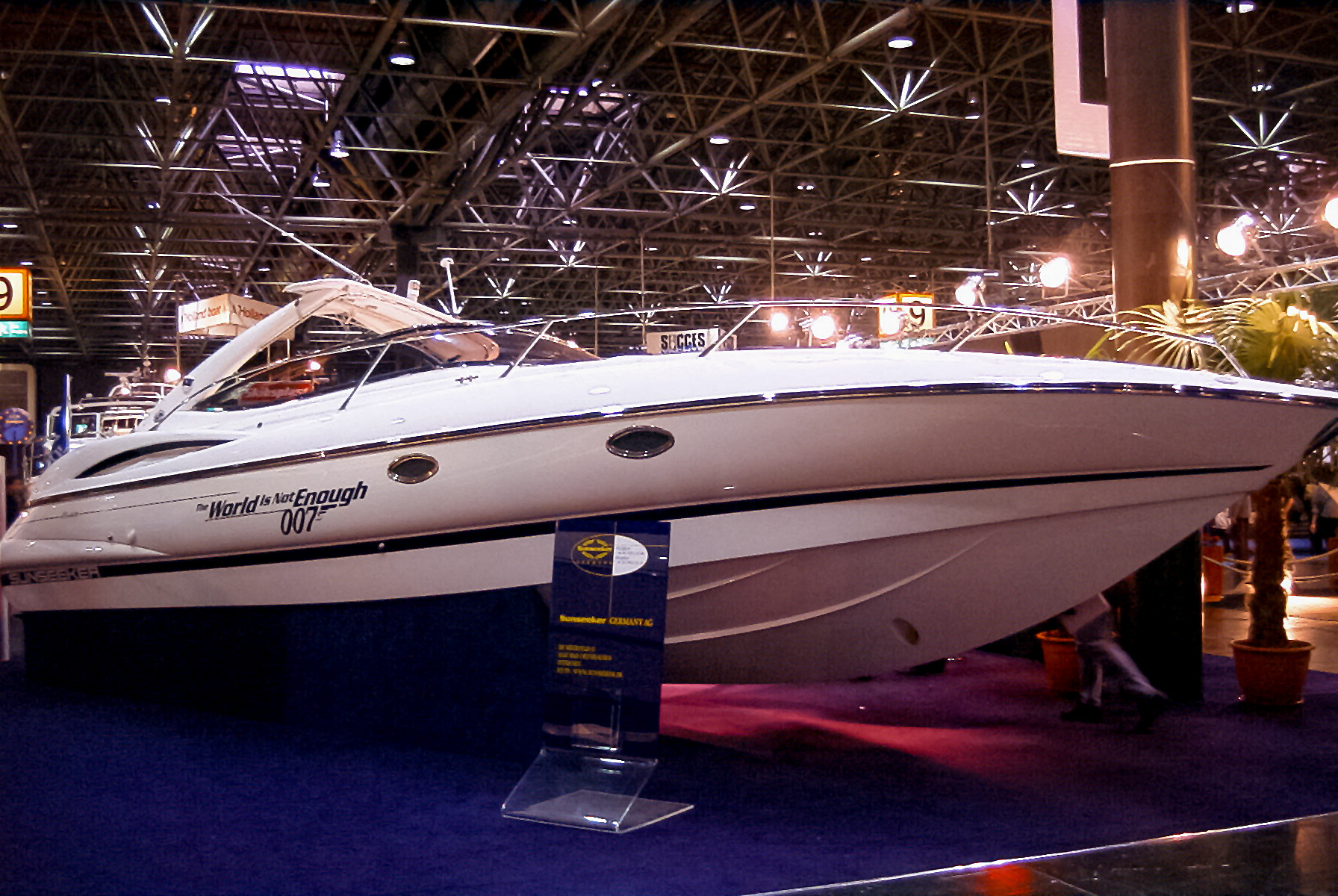
Sunseeker Superhawk 34 used in The World Is Not Enough, 1999, James Bond chase sequence.

In 2024, Sunseeker changed ownership again to two private equity firms, Lionheart Capital from the U.S. and Italy’s Orienta Capital Partners, acquired the company from Dalian Wanda Group. The deal was officially announced at the Fort Lauderdale International Boat Show in October 2024. This acquisition by Lionheart and Orienta Capital aims to further strengthen Sunseeker's brand globally while expanding its reach in both the North American and European luxury yacht markets.

== Appearance in popular culture ==
Sunseeker boats have featured in the James Bond film series since The World Is Not Enough (1999), and continued through Die Another Day (2002), Casino Royale (2006) and Quantum of Solace (2008). The 1999 outing featured Sunseeker's then new offering of the Superhawk 34, in a boat chase within the pre credits sequence with James Bond in a jet boat along the River Thames, culminating in the Sunseeker beaching near the Millennium Dome. This latest outing showed Sunseeker's new 37m Yacht and the Superhawk 43; it also featured a cameo role for Sunseeker's then managing director, Robert Braithwaite, in one of Sunseeker's first open-cockpit speedboats, the Sovereign 17.

A BBC Two documentary about the brand, Britain's Biggest Superyachts: Chasing Perfection, shows the building of the Sunseeker 131 yacht.

In the feature film Logan, James (Wolverine) is shown trying to secure money to buy a Sunseeker and live with Charles Xavier and Caliban on the ocean.

== Criticism and legal issues ==
In August 2011 a yacht owner participating in a tour organised by Sunseeker ran over a surfer in the Bay of Lübeck. The surfer was severely injured and lost one of his legs. The incident triggered an investigation by the German Federal Bureau for Maritime Casualty Investigation, which found that the Predator 74 line of yachts has ‘significant deficiencies in terms of horizontal all-round visibility’. The investigation results are summarised in the statement: ‘The layout of the helm station on the motor yacht “Seewind” does not comply with the DIN EN ISO 11591: 2000 standard.’ The yacht's skipper, a German businessman, was given an eight-month suspended prison sentence and had to pay the victim €200,000 in damages for pain and suffering.

In November 2024 Sunseeker was fined £358,760 by Bournemouth Crown Court for 11 illegal imports of Teak wood from Myanmar, costing the company about £60,000 at the time. The imports violated the United Kingdom Timber Regulation, successor to the European Union Timber Regulation.

== See also ==
- Fairline Boats
- Princess Yachts
