= Mitesh Patel (disambiguation) =

Mitesh Patel (born 1976) is a field hockey player from New Zealand.

Mitesh Patel may also refer to:

- Mitesh Patel (cricketer) (born 1997), Indian cricketer.
- Mitesh Rameshbhai Patel (fl. 2019), known as Bakabhai, Indian politician.
- Mitesh Patel, founder of Lenstore in 2008
- Mitesh Patel, a fictional character in 2017 film Carry On Kesar
