= Sunday Times Top Track 250 =

Sunday Times Top Track 250 logo

The Sunday Times Top Track 250 is an annual league table published in association with The Sunday Times newspaper in the UK. It ranks Britain’s private mid-market growth companies with the biggest sales. It is published in The Sunday Times each October, with an awards event typically held in November, and alumni dinners during the year. The league table is researched and produced by Fast Track, an Oxford based research and networking events business.

== About Fast Track ==
Fast Track is a leading research and events company that has built a network of the UK’s top-performing private companies, from the fastest-growing to the biggest, through its rankings in The Sunday Times. Founded in 1997 by Hamish Stevenson, it now publishes seven annual league tables and brings company founders and directors together at invitation-only networking awards events and alumni dinners.

== Entry criteria ==
Companies have to meet the criteria below to be able to qualify for the Top Track 250 league table:

- Sales are typically between £700m (the bottom ranked company on Top Track 100) and £120m
- UK registered, unquoted, and not subsidiaries
- Sales are taken as total turnover, net of VAT
- Sales in the latest year must have grown by 5% or more for companies with the highest sales, graduated to 10% for those with lower sales; or profit growth must have been 5% or more
- Companies must also have operating profit margins that exceed 2%
- Trading weeks in the latest year have to exceed 25
- Companies may have their ultimate holding company offshore

Exclusions

- Companies that are equal joint ventures, or majority-owned by quoted or other companies
- Companies with the majority of sales generated by their quoted subsidiaries
- Companies with fewer than 50 staff
- Not-for-profit companies, co-operative societies, mutual societies, provident associations, and member-owned buying groups

Companies that do not meet all the criteria can still be considered for the Ones to Watch programme, particularly if they forecast good sales growth.

== Notable alumni companies ==
Top Track 250 was launched in 2005 to recognise Britain’s private mid-market growth companies with the biggest sales. Since its launch, more than 1,000 companies have appeared on the league table, including:

- Dyson, which was first featured in 2005 with sales of £277.1m, and by 2019 was ranked at No.7 on Top Track 100 with sales of £4.4bn, and profits of £1.1bn
- The Watches of Switzerland Group, which featured 10 times before its IPO in May 2019, valuing it at £647m
- B&M Retail featured three times from 2009 to 2011, with initial sales of £255.9m, before its IPO in June 2014 valuing it at £2.7bn
- IHS Markit first featured in 2010 with sales of £305m; floated in 2014 and completed a $13bn merger with IHS in 2016
- Ocado first featured in 2006, with sales of £143m and floated in 2010

== Latest Top Track 250 list ==
The 16th annual Sunday Times Top Track 250 league table supplement was published on 27 September 2020 and featured established brands including Dr Martens, and Thatchers Cider as well as number 1 ranked company Turner & Townsend.

== Previous rankings ==
=== 2013 Top Track 250 list ===
Virgin Active, the health club operator, was ranked 1st in the Sunday Times Top Track 250 with sales of £641.5 million, a rise of 14 places compared to 2012.

Other significant rises in The Top Track 250 league table include Wonga.com (Sales £309.3 million), with a rise of 140; Countryside Properties (Sales £272.9 million) – rise of 85; Opus Energy (Sales £369.5 million) – a rise of 73; The Range (Sales £381.9 million) – a rise of 63.

=== 2012 Top Track 250 list ===
Shepherd Group, one of the UK's leading family-owned private businesses, was named in 1st position of The Top Track 2012 with sales of £607.7 million.

New entrants to The Top Track 2012 include A.T. Kearney – management consultancy – with sales of £604.1 million; Camelot UK Lotteries – lottery operator – with sales of £574.5 million; Aurora Fashions – fashion retailer – with sales of £568.8 million; City Electrical Factors – electrical parts wholesaler – with sales of £527.2 million.

=== 2011 Top Track 250 list ===
Partnership, the life assurance specialist was ranked number 1 in Top Track 250 for the first time in 2011 with sales of £587.9 million, followed by: Noble Foods – egg products manufacturer – with sales of £558.8 million; Farmfoods – frozen food retailer – with sales of £558 million; Edrington – whisky and rum distiller – with sales of £553.4 million; and Gondola – restaurant operator – at position 5, with sales of £545 million.

=== 2010 Top Track 250 list ===
The Sunday Times Top Track 250 league table list was published on 17 October 2010 with the title sponsor HSBC. The Sixth Annual Sunday Times HSBC Top Track 250 awards dinner was held at the Jumeirah Carlton Tower Hotel in London on the night of 14 October and was attended by owners and directors of country's leading mid-market private companies. The sixth annual Top Track 250 league table supplement was published in The Sunday Times on 17 October 2010 with HSBC as the title sponsor.

TJ Morris 590.3 (Sales £m), Watson Petroleum 584.7 (Sales £m), Aurora Fashions 550.0 (Sales £m), Vestey Group 541.2 (Sales £m), Dunbia 540.4 (Sales £m), Noble Foods 533.5 (Sales £m), NDS Group 521.7 (Sales £m), Harrods 519.8 (Sales £m), Agricola Group 510.8 (Sales £m), Warburtons 510.5 (Sales £m)

Southall Travel is the only travel agency included in the influential league table. The agency recorded astounding sales of £203.1 million for the year ending in March 2010 and was ranked at 148th place. Other companies from the travel industry listed include Gatwick airport in 16th with sales of £475 million, the Alternative Hotel Group at 18th with sales of £465 million, Travelodge at 71st with sales of £297 million, Park Resorts at 215th with sales of £154 million and Holiday Extras at 236th with sales of £145 million.

=== 2008 Top Track 250 list ===
The 250 companies in the list follow on from the Top Track 100 list published in June. The companies account for 5% of GDP and 1.5% of the UK workforce. The Combined turnover is £69 billion ( up £11 billion on 2007)saw an average profit increase of 67% pa with the maximum increase being 114% pa. Profits across the list vary greatly with many firms in the Profit Track 100 list, totalling over £4 billion. Employees increased from 400,000 to 477,000 in these companies over last years list. The list includes some well known household names, some of whom were taken private (De listed companies). Some are wholly Family owned others are owned by Venture capital trusts, or bank investors. Some previous entrants have now floated.

This list is compiled from the Sunday Times Top Track 250, 2008.

Rank	Company name	Sector	Location	T/o(Sales) (£ Million)	Profit(nett) (£ Million)
1.	Flybe	Airline	Exeter	£536	£38
2.	Mace	Construction (PM)	London	£531	£6.8
3.	NG Bailey	Construction (M&E)	Leeds	£524	
4.	Samworth Brothers	Food production	Leicestershire	£518	
5.	Odeon Cinemas & UCI Cinemas Group	Leisure	London	£517	
6.	Aston Martin	Car Manufacturer	Warwickshire	£515	
7.	Dyson	Household appliances	Wiltshire	£514	
8.	Firth Rixson	Engineering & aerospace	Sheffield	£492	
9.	Morrison Utility Services	Construction	Stevenage	£492	
10.	McCarthy & Stone	Retirement home Builders	Bournemouth	£471	
11.	Formula One Administration	Motor Racing	London		
12.	Associated British Ports	Port operator	London		
13.	Perrys Motor Sales	Car Dealerships	Northampton		
14.	Healthcare at Home	Healthcare provider	Burton on Trent		
15.	Murray International	Conglomerate	Edinburgh		
16.	Spire Healthcare	Healthcare provider	London		
17.	Countryside Properties	Property developer	Brentwood		
18.	Northern & Shell	Newspapers & Publishing	London		
19.	Giant Group	Outsourcing provider	London		
20.	Harrods	Department store operator	London	£440	£45.8
21.	Gondola				
22.	Watson Petroleum				
23.	Edwards Industrial				
24.	Bernard Matthews	Food production	Norwich	£422	£21.6
25.	Warburtons				
26.	Kearney				
27.	William Grant & Sons	Whiskey Distiller			
28.	PA Consulting Group				
29.	Henderson Group				
30.	CP Holdings				
31.	Farmfoods				
32.	Halcrow Group				
33.	Vertex				
34.	Willmott Dixon				
35.	2 Sisters Food Group				
36.	Weetabix	Cereal manufacturer	Northamptonshire	£372	£61.1
37.	SHS Group				
38.	Four Seasons Health Care				
39.	Arqiva				
40.	BOCM Pauls				
41.	Carcraft				
42.	Bargain Booze				
43.	Noble Foods				
44.	Pets at Home				
45.	Dhamecha Foods				
46.	Northgate Information Solutions				
47.	Argent Group				
48.	Barchester Healthcare				
49.	Selfridges	Department store operator	London	£348	
50.	Stewart Milne				
51.	Polstar				
52.	Alexander Mann Solutions				
53.	Telegraph Media Group	Newspaper publishing	London	£341	
54.	Zavvi	(formerly Virgin music shops); Retail	London	£341	
55.	Pentagon Motor Group				
56.	Langley Holdings				
57.	ERM Consultants				
58.	Bayford & Co	Fuel distributors	Leeds	£335	£2.1
59.	Agnew Group				
60.	James Hall & Company				
61.					
62.					
63.					
64.					
65.					
66.	Direct Wines (Laithwaites)	Mailorder Wine Distributor	£317	£2.7	
67.					
68.					
69.					
70.	Virgin Active	Health clubs	Milton Keynes	£313	£19.2
71.	Telent	Communications	Warwick	£311	£22
72.	Poundland	Retail operators (Discount shops)	West Midlands	£311	
73.	ASCO				
74.	Eastern Western Motor Group				
75.	PHS				
76.					
77.					
78.					
79.					
80.					
81.					
82.					
83.					
84.					
85.					
86.					
87.	Rix Petroleum	Fuel distributor	Hull	£294	
88.	Sunseeker International	Yacht builder	Poole (Dorset)	£293	£13.7
89.	Anglian Group	Building supplies (Windows)	Norwich	£292	£8.2
90.	Ridgeway Group				
91.					
92.					
93.					
94.					
95.					
96.					
97.	Emap Communications	Media publisher	London	£283	
98.	Fenwick	Department store	Newcastle	£280	
99.	Berry Brothers & Rudd				
100.	Globespan				
101.					
102.					
103.					
104.					
105.					
106.	CPL Industries	Fuel distributor	Chesterfield	£274	
107.					
108.	Ocado	Online food retailer	Hatfield	£272	
109.					
110.	Seddon Group				
111.	Williams Group				
112.					
113.					
114.					
115.					
116.	Barrett Steel Group	Steel Distributor	Bradford	£261	
117.					
118.					
119.					
120.	Ballyvesy Holdings				
121.	British Seafood				
122.	NCP	Car park operator	Croydon	£253	
123.	Center Parcs UK	Holiday park operator	Nottinghamshire	£251	
124.	Osbourne	Building Contractors	Chichester	£251	
125.	Freightliner Group				
134.	David McLean	Building contractor	Flintshire	£245	
135.	DC Thomson				
136.	Travelodge	Budget Hotel chain	Oxfordshire	£243	
140.	TJ Hughes	Retailer,	Liverpool	£240	
150.	Vue Entertainment				
157.	Pret a Manger	Sandwich & Coffee shops	London	£222	
158.					
159.					
160.	City Refrigeration Holdings				
161.					
162.					
163.					
164.					
165.	Clancy Docwra				
166.	TC Harrison	Car & JCB Dealerships	Derbyshire	£215	
169.	Borders (UK)	Book retailer	London	£215	-£9.5
170.	Apollo Group				
171.	Alexander Dennis	Coach & Bus builders	Falkirk	£213	
174.	Ebuyer	Internet retailer	East Yorkshire	£212	
175.	BGL Group				
176.					
177.					
178.					
179.	Manchester United Football Club	Football Club	Manchester	£210	
180.	GK Group	Car Distributor	Chesterfield	£209	
187.	McLaren Automotive	Race car builder & team	Surrey	£206	
188.					
189.					
190.	Moody International				
191.	Arsenal Football Club	Football team	London	£200	
192.					
193.	David Lloyd Leisure	Health club operator	Hatfield	£198	
194.					
195.	Bulkhaul	Transport specialist	Middlesbrough	£196	
196.	Epwim Group				
197.	Danoptra				
198.	Travelsphere				
199.	Thomas Vale				
200.	Lamex Food Group				
207.	Snax 24	Forecourt operator	Hertfordshire	£191	
208.	Cleveland Cable Company	Cable Distributor	Middlesbrough	£191	
209.	Swift Group	Caravan & Motorhome manufacture	East Yorkshire	£191	
210.	Malcolm Group				
217.	Simons Group	Construction	Lincolnshire	£188	
218.					
219.					
220.					
221.					
222.					
223.					
224.					
225.	Betfair	Online Bookmaker	London	£181	
227.	Maplin Electronics	Electronics retailer	Rotherham	£179	
229.	Shearings (Wallace Arnold)	Tour operator	Lancashire	£179	
230.	Cromwell Group				
231.	Mabey Group	Bridges, Steel & Engineering	Reading	£177	
232.					
233.					
234.	BizzEnergy	Electricity supplier	Worcestershire	£175	
236.	Gilders Group	Car distributor	Sheffield	£173	
237.	Davies Turner|				
238.					
239.					
240.	Best Connection Group				
241.	McNicholas Construction				
242.	CF Booth	Recycling & Scrap merchants	Rotherham	£169	
250.	Harvey Nichols	Department store operator	London	£166	

== Other Fast Track publications ==
Top Track 250 is one of seven league tables of private companies produced by Fast Track and published in The Sunday Times:

- Fast Track 100 – ranks the UK’s fastest-growing private companies based on sales (excluding TMT companies, which appear in Tech Track 100 (see below)
- SME Export Track 100 – ranks the UK's SMEs with the fastest-growing international sales
- Tech Track 100 – ranks the UK’s fastest-growing private technology companies based on sales (the sister table to Fast Track 100)
- International Track 200 – ranks the UK’s private mid-market companies with the fastest-growing overseas sales
- Profit Track 100 – ranks the UK’s private companies with the fastest-growing profits
- Top Track 250 – ranks the UK’s leading mid-market private companies based on sales and/or profits growth
- Top Track 100 – ranks the UK’s biggest private companies based on sales
