= Southall Travel =

Travel agency based in London, England

- Type: Private
- Industry: Travel Agency
- Founded: 1984, United Kingdom
- Headquarters: Dover Street, Mayfair, London, W1S 4NF, United Kingdom
- Key people: Kuljinder Bahia (CEO)
- Revenue: £524 million, 2023
- Net income: £30.7 million, 2023
- Website: www.southalltravel.co.uk

Southall Travel is a privately owned UK-based travel agency located in Southall, in the London Borough of Ealing. The company is part of Southall Travel Group and operates both physical locations and online booking. The company has made both the list of Sunday Times Fast Track 100 and Sunday Times Top Track 250.

== History ==
Southall Travel was founded in 1984 in the United Kingdom. In its infancy, it was a small travel agency that served the Asian UK market with bookings mainly in India and Asia. The company grew from revenues of £500,000 in 1991 to revenues of £240 million in 2011. Kuljinder Bahia was appointed as the company's managing director in 1997 at the age of 24. He is attributed with growing sales of the company 63% a year during the time period of 2001 to 2004. In 2008, he was honoured with the Young Entrepreneur of the Year Award for his work with the company.

In 2007, Southall Travel launched "The Holiday Team", a business-to-business division that provides wholesale travel. Southall Travel also operates Applehouse Travel, a travel management company that handles Southall Travel's corporate travel business, and is a member of the Guild of Travel Management Companies. The Holiday Team joined the Truly Independent Professional Travel Organisation (Tipto) in 2013, becoming the 13th member in the organisation.

Southall Travel launched Travel Trolley in 2013. The site is the official online travel agency of Southall Travel and offers flights and holiday packages booking.

== Awards and recognition ==
Southall Travel were the only travel agency in 2010 to be on the Sunday Times Top Track 250 list of most successful companies in the United Kingdom. They continued on the Top Track 250 in 2011 and 2012.
