= Chatty Café Scheme =

British social enterprise

The Chatty Café Scheme
- Type: Not for Profit Social Enterprise
- Founded: 2019
- Headquarters: Oldham, England
- Area served: United Kingdom
- Key people: Alexandra Louise Hoskyn, director
- Website: thechattycafescheme.co.uk

The Chatty Cafe Scheme is an initiative started in the UK to encourage conversation among strangers.

The scheme was started in 2017 and promotes the marking of certain tables in cafes and other venues as tables at which talking to strangers is explicitly welcome. The initiative found support by several companies and politicians in the UK. The Chatty Cafe Scheme CIC was registered as a community interest company on 19 July 2019.

The founder of the initiative and director of the company, Alexandra Louise Hoskyn, was awarded an OBE in the Queen's Birthday Honours for 2021.

== United Kingdom ==
=== Implementation in the United Kingdom ===
The first Chatter & Natter table was set up in a cafe in Oldham, England, in 2017. The founder of the initiative and later director of the company, Alexandra Louise Hoskyn, is a social worker in the Learning Disability and Autism team in Oldham. The Chatty Cafe scheme soon found support by Costa Coffee and Sainsbury's, referring to the tables with varying terms, for example "talking tables", and was implemented in cafes across the country as well as in the United States. By 2023, there are over 1400 participating cafes around the world.

The Oldham Borough Council discussed the scheme and noted that "libraries, leisure centres, and the local markets; health centres and hospitals run by the NHS; and pubs, cafes, shopping centres and retail parks run by business partners have potential to host such schemes". Other organizations supporting the scheme included Beefeater, Age UK, Mind, Campaign to End Loneliness, and Whitebread. Andy Street, mayor of the West Midlands county, campaigned for coffee shops and other venues to participate in the scheme. MP David Lammy referred to the scheme in his book Tribes in terms of his proposed 'encounter culture' for encouraging "meaningful engagement between people of different ages, ethnicities, backgrounds and places on an equal basis".

Chatty Cafes run three afternoons a week. To overcome persons' hesitation to be the first at a table, the initiative created the role of an "ambassador" as a person to be present at a table a few hours a week. Additionally, the role of a "volunteer" was created, who visits various venues seeking feedback as to how the tables are going.

During the COVID-19 pandemic in the United Kingdom, the scheme was extended to include telephone and video calls to combat isolation, matching volunteers with persons wanting a call on a weekly basis. Local social services have used the Chatty Cafe initiative as part of social prescribing.

In September 2020, the Chatty Cafe Scheme joined the British government's Tackling Loneliness Network, a group of charities formed in spring 2020 as part of the government's plan to tackle loneliness and social isolation during the COVID-19 outbreak and period of social distancing.

In 2023, there were approximately 600 venues across the United Kingdom, and at the end of the year 2025 approximately 700.

=== Critical views ===
Bethan Harris, the founder of the research project Loneliness Lab, has been quoted as saying that initiatives such as the Chatty Cafe scheme are praiseworthy, yet may offer too simplistic solutions as far as overcoming loneliness is concerned, given that people may be searching for meaningful interaction and the opportunity to build relations, not mere chance interaction.

=== Similar initiatives ===
In 2019, the BBC reported on "Happy to Chat" benches and on an initiative by the BBC and public transport companies encouraging people to talk to their fellow passengers.

== Implementation abroad ==
In December 2019, Hoskyn presented the scheme in a TEDxKazimierzWomen event in Kraków, Małopolskie, Poland, and at the end of 2020, Chatter and Natter tables had been set up in Poland, Gibraltar, Australia and Canada.

== Impact ==
The scheme started in Britain, where "traditional reserve is said to make it almost impossible for the British to talk to strangers in public places". The scheme has been cited as one of several examples of social, affective spaces. Sociologist Thomas Thurnell-Read has credited the initiative as inspiring further schemes such as the use of 'Join Me' cards in a pub in the Southeast of England. Such cards enable customers to let other customers and staff know they are open to having a conversation.

== Awards ==
- 2018: Royal Society grant
- 2019: Innovating for Ageing competition by the Just group and International Longevity Centre
- 2020: Points of Light award by British prime minister Boris Johnson for "transforming the culture of talking to other people in cafes, combating loneliness and opening up people's lives" with the scheme.
- 2021: OBE for Hoskyn in the Queen's Birthday Honours for 2021
