= Averdieck =

Averdieck is a surname. Notable people with the surname include:

- Elise Averdieck (1808–1907), German social activist, deaconess, and writer
- James Averdieck (born 1965), British entrepreneur
