= Watercolour World =

Arts charity & online world gazetteer

The Watercolour World is a UK-based charity founded in 2016 by Fred Hohler (founder of the Public Catalogue Foundation) to create an online gazetteer of the world pre-1900.

== Supporters ==
The charity’s joint patrons are King Charles III and Queen Camilla. The official launch was held at the Royal Academy of Arts on 31 January 2019. The Watercolour World is supported financially by its co-founder, Javad Marandi through the Marandi Foundation. Sir Charles Saumarez Smith is chairman of the trustees and Fred Hohler is executive director of the charity.

== Project ==
The project catalogues and makes freely available watercolours of identifiable places and landscapes, primarily drawn between 1750 and 1900. Images are taken from private, governmental and military collections − the latter stemming from the fact that officers at the Royal Military Academy, Woolwich studied drawing and were taught how to survey landscapes by artists such as Paul Sandby. The Watercolour World is of use to historians and climate change scientists because it shows how the world looked prior to the age of photography. For example, the extent of the loss of Himalayan ice fields is obvious from images dating back to the 1840s. The charity collates material from around the globe: the Rijksmuseum, the Metropolitan Museum of Art and the Musée des Beaux-Arts d'Orléans have contributed images alongside the British Museum, the Royal Collection and Chatsworth.
