= Pots & Co =

British dessert manufacturing company

- Type: Private
- Industry: Dessert
- Founded: 2012
- Founder: Julian Dyer
- Headquarters: London, United Kingdom (international); Los Angeles, California (US)
- Revenue: £12.9M (2023)
- Owner: Julian Dyer
- Website: www.potsandco.com

Pots & Co is a British company that manufactures desserts sold in glass pots. It was founded in 2012 and offers its products in a variety of supermarkets and airlines. It has international operations in the United States, France, the Netherlands, Switzerland, Belgium, and Australia.

== History ==
Pots & Co was founded in 2012 by Julian Dyer. Dyer was formerly a professional chef and wanted to fill a gap in the premium desserts industry. In 2016, its products became available on flights by British Airways. Dyer claimed he was trying to emulate the profit of a similar company, Gü. The company also began shipping the pots to Australia in 2016. In 2017, due to the great success of the company outside the United Kingdom and a deal with Delta Air Lines, Pots & Co reached the top of The Grocer Fast 50. It held the spot until 2019.

International sales dropped significantly during the COVID-19 pandemic, due to supply chain disruptions and the interruption of its deal with airline companies. The investment arm of General Mills, 301 Inc, invested up to £20M in Pots & Co in 2021, to assist with the company's expansion into the United States. In 2022, the company switched the material of their pots from plastic to glass to make it recyclable and more environmentally friendly. The plastic pots and glass ramekins are made by packaging company Aegg.

== Products ==
The handmade potted desserts, for which the company is known, have three flavours: salted caramel and chocolate, molten chocolate cake, and upside-down lemon cheesecake. There are also peach and almond crumble and strawberry shortcake flavours that come in larger pots.
