= National Care Group =

English social care provider

The National Care Group is a social care provider based in Accrington. It was established in March 2016 by Jamil Mawji and Faisal Lalani. They previously helped set up 99p Stores. It provides support services for people with complex needs arising from learning disability, mental health and acquired brain injury.

It was third in the Sunday Times Fast Track 100 league table in December 2020. Sales grew by an average 183% a year to £60.8 million in 2020. It has acquired 36 other providers. 650 new staff were recruited between March and December 2020. It has 2,400 staff who support over 1230 people. James Allen is the chief executive officer.

It bought the Rotherham-based company Steps Residential Care, which was established in 1999, in November 2020 with funding provided by Allied Irish Bank with which it has an ongoing relationship. It provides residential care for up to 26 adults with learning disabilities.

The property management and compliance company, Velway, has a contract to support their 47 properties.

The company has, like the rest of the sector, recruitment and staff turnover issues, but in 2018 said that staff turnover was comfortably below the industry average of 28%.

In 2021/2 it was supporting more than 1,245 people and had more than 1,015 staff.

It worked with Wiltshire Council to set up seven self-contained flats in Calne in Wiltshire in 2022. The development, called Palmarium, is intended to help adults with learning disabilities to live independently near their families. There will be 40 staff including support workers and management-level roles.

== See also ==
- Private healthcare in the United Kingdom
