= Tech Track 100 =

Sunday Times Tech Track 100 logo

The Sunday Times Tech Track 100 is an annual league table published in association with The Sunday Times newspaper in the UK. It ranks Britain’s 100 private technology companies with the fastest-growing sales over their last three years. It is published in The Sunday Times each September, with an awards event typically held in November, and networking dinners for alumni companies throughout the year. The league table is researched and produced by Fast Track, an Oxford-based research and networking events business.

== About Fast Track ==
Fast Track was a leading research and events company that built a network of the UK’s top-performing private companies, from the fastest-growing to the biggest, through its rankings in The Sunday Times. Founded in 1997 by Hamish Stevenson, it published seven annual league tables and brought company founders and directors together at invitation-only networking awards events and alumni dinners.

== Criteria ==
Companies have to meet the below criteria to be able to qualify for the Tech Track 100 league table:

• Independent technology company

• UK registered, unquoted, and not subsidiaries

• Sales of at least £250,000 in the base year

• Sales of at least £5m in the latest year

• Trading weeks in the base and latest years have to exceed 25

Companies that do not meet the criteria can still be considered for the Ones to Watch programme. This is a selection of companies that have either achieved, or predict, good sales growth.

=== Exclusions ===
• Excluded companies include payday lenders, computer resellers and companies that are equal joint ventures, or majority-owned by quoted or other companies. IT consultancies and IT services companies are required to generate a significant proportion of their sales from proprietary technologies.

== Notable alumni companies ==
Tech Track 100 was launched in 2001 to recognise Britain’s private technology companies with the fastest-growing sales. Since its launch, more than 1,000 companies have appeared on the league table, including:

• Blue Prism, the automation software developer, featured as a One to Watch in 2015 with sales of £4.5m. It floated in 2016 raising £21.1m. In June 2019, it acquired thoughtonomy, No. 4 in Tech Track 100 2018, in a $100m deal.

• Ocado, the online supermarket, first appeared on Tech Track 100 in 2006 with sales of £143m. It floated in 2010.

• Sophos, the cybersecurity software provider, which first featured in 2002, was valued at £1bn when it floated in 2015.

• Just Eat, the online takeaway business, which first featured in 2011, was valued at £1.5bn when it floated in 2014, and merged with Dutch firm, Takeaway.com, in a £6.2bn deal in 2020.

• King, the gaming website operator, first appeared on Tech Track 100 in 2007, floated in 2014 and was acquired by Activision Blizzard for $5.9bn in 2016.

== Latest Tech Track 100 league table ==
The 20th anniversary Sunday Times Tech Track 100 league table supplement was published on 6 September 2020 and featured companies such as tech unicorns Darktrace, Checkout.com and TransferWise. The top company was Revolut, the digital banking services provider. This is the last time that the Sunday Times Tech Track 100 league table was published.

== Previous rankings ==
The 2012 Sunday Times Tech Track 100 league table ranked the top 100 of Britain's private technology, digital media and telecoms (TMT) companies that demonstrated the fastest sales growth over the preceding three years, between 2008 and 2011, or between 2009 and 2012.

The 2012 Tech Track included a new category, Ones to Recognise, for the first time since the inaugural awards in 1997. This is a list of five companies which demonstrate strong potential but did not make it into the top 100 spots.

2012 Top 1–20 Rankings
Ranking	Company Name	Business Activity	Sales growth (% per annum)	Notes
1	Essence	Digital marketing agency	283.94	http://www.essencedigital.com/
2	LycaMobile	International telecoms operator	247.25	http://www.lycamobile.com/
3	Wonga.com	Online money lender	244.57	http://www.wonga.com/
4	MobileWebAdz	Mobile advertising provider	217.72	http://www.mobilewebadz.com/
5	ZBD Solutions	E-paper display developer	212.80	http://www.zbdsolutions.com/
6	musicMagpie.co.uk	Online entertainment trader	191.31	http://www.musicmagpie.co.uk/
7	Nomad Digital	Transport communications provider	185.69	http://www.uknomad.com/
8	WageDayAdvance	Online money lender	171.85	http://www.wagedayadvance.co.uk/
9	AlertMe	Smart home monitoring provider	168.99	http://www.alertme.com/
10	Unruly Media	Video advertising distributor	157.61	http://www.unrulymedia.com/
11	Equal Experts	Software developer	154.90	http://www.equalexperts.com/
12	Ubiquisys	Telecoms services provider	151.82	http://www.ubiquisys.com/
13	Asperity Employee Benefits	Employee benefits provider	145.13	http://www.asperity.co.uk/
14	Evance Wind Turbines	Wind turbines developer	144.28	http://www.evancewind.com/
15	BCS Global	Video-conferencing services provider	138.49	http://www.bcsglobal.com/
16	MedicAnimal	Online pet retailer	118.42	http://www.medicanimal.com/
17	Skyscanner.net	Flight comparison website	118.20	http://www.skyscanner.net/
18	Bowman Power	Electrical turbogenerator developer	116.99	http://www.bowmanpower.com/
19	Rarewaves	Entertainment retailer	113.40	https://www.rarewaves.com/
20	Omnifone	Digital music provider	106.28	https://web.archive.org/web/20090810073617/http://www.omnifone.com/

=== 2011 top ten rankings ===
2012 top ten rankings
Ranking	Company Name	Business Activity	Sales growth (% per annum)	Notes
1	Wonga.com	Online money lender	361.29	http://www.wonga.com/
2	Reward Gateway Employee Benefits	Employee benefits provider	266.52	http://uk.rewardgateway.com/
3	GadjetSupply.com	Premium Mobile Phone Accessories supplier	205.21	http://www.gadjetsupply.com/
4	Fixnetix	Financial trading services provider	191.13	http://www.fixnetix.com/
5	XConnect	Telecoms services provider	171.68	http://www.xconnect.net/
6	I Spy	Digital marketing agency	169.63	http://www.ispymarketing.com/
7	Telemetry	Online video delivery and analysis	168.54	http://www.telemetry.com/
8	The Hut Group	Online retailer	141.62	http://www.thehut.com/
9	Peach Telecom	Telecoms services provider	137.36	http://www.peachtelecom.co.uk/
10	Smart Traffic	Digital marketing agency	129.36	http://www.smart-traffic.co.uk/

=== 2010 top ten rankings ===
2010 top ten rankings
Ranking	Company Name	Business Activity	Sales growth (% per annum)	Notes
1	PKR	3D poker website operator	356.44	http://www.pkr.com/
2	Mimecast	Email management services provider	173.14	http://www.mimecast.com/
3	Quickstart Global	IT services provider	167.89	http://www.quickstartglobal.com/
4	The Hut Group	Online retailer	161.92	http://www.thehut.com/
5	Adconion Media Group	Digital advertising distributor	149.65	http://www.adconion.com/
6	Monumental Games	Computer games developer	146.31	http://www.monumentalgames.com/
7	Shebang	Point-of-sale software developer	136.58	http://www.shebang.net/
8	Forward Internet Group	Media technology developer	120.04	http://www.forward.co.uk/
9	GPEG	LCD developer	119.92	http://www.gpegint.com/
10	Sciemus	Risk-analysis software developer	118.46	http://www.sciemus.com/

=== 2009 top ten rankings ===
2009 Top ten rankings
Ranking	Company Name	Business Activity	Sales growth (% per annum)	Notes
1	The Hut Group	Online retailer	188.77	http://www.thehut.com/
2	ApaTech	Bone graft manufacturer	180.08	http://www.apatech.com/
3	wewillbuyyourcar.com	Online car dealer	177.88	http://www.wewillbuyyourcar.com/
4	Mobica	Mobile phone application designer	174.92	http://www.mobica.com/
5	Phyworks	Integrated circuits developer	168.03	http://www.phyworks-ic.com/
6	Skrill	Online payment provider	152.40	http://www.moneybookers.com/
7	Geo Networks	Fibre optic network provider	146.29	http://www.geo-uk.net/
8	Ubisense	Precision location technology provider	127.89	http://www.ubisense.net/
9	LOVEFILM.com	Online DVD rental provider	127.78	http://www.lovefilm.com/
10	The Cloud	Wireless broadband service provider	113.20	http://www.thecloud.net/

=== 2008 top ten rankings ===
2008 top ten rankings
Ranking	Company Name	Business Activity	Sales growth (% per annum)	Notes
1	Mobile Interactive Group	Mobile and digital technology provider	422.30	https://web.archive.org/web/20120617185936/http://www.migcan.com/
2	LOVEFILM.com	Online DVD rental provider	239.28	http://www.lovefilm.com/
3	Netbasic	Website developer	235.30	http://www.netbasic.co.uk/
4	Timico	Converged communications provider	205.70	http://www.timico.co.uk/
5	ApaTech	Bone graft manufacturer	204.57	http://www.apatech.com/
6	Tideway Systems	Software developer	184.01	http://www.tideway.com/
7	NEG Telecom	Telecoms services provider	175.40	https://web.archive.org/web/20060721201749/http://www.networkeuropegroup.com/
8	The Hut Group	Online retailer	173.07	http://www.thehut.com/
9	Tomorrow Communications	IT network provider	153.11	http://www.tomorrowcomms.com/
10	Forward Internet Group	Media technology developer	151.91	http://www.forward.co.uk/

=== 2007 top ten rankings ===
2007 top ten rankings
Ranking	Company Name	Business Activity	Sales growth (% per annum)	Notes
1	Holiday Rooms Direct	Online hotel agency	513.98	http://www.holidayroomsdirect.com/
2	Codian	Video conferencing	489.49	http://www.codian.com/
3	The Best Of	Community website franchisor	486.31	
4	AMV Holding	Mobile content provider	467.00	https://web.archive.org/web/20130303185311/http://amvholding.com/
5	LOVEFILM.com	Online DVD rental provider	367.92	http://www.lovefilm.com/
6	Pitch Entertainment	Mobile services provider	326.42	http://www.pitch.tv/
7	Stirk Lamont & Associates	ICT consultancy	317.64	http://www.sla-ltd.com/
8	NEG Telecom	Telecoms services provider	265.73	https://web.archive.org/web/20060721201749/http://www.networkeuropegroup.com/
9	buy.at	Online marketer	254.10	http://www.buy.at/
10	Timico	Converged communications provider	253.99	http://www.timico.co.uk/

=== 2006 top ten rankings ===
2006 top ten rankings
Ranking	Company Name	Business Activity	Sales growth (% per annum)	Notes
1	Gamesys	Gaming website operator	301.48	http://www.gamesyscorporate.com/
2	Apertio	Mobile telecoms software developer	299.50	https://web.archive.org/web/20120414152916/http://www.apertio.co.uk/
3	Pulsic	Silicon chip software developer	272.31	http://www.pulsic.com/
3	The Search Works	Search engine advertiser	272.31	http://www.thesearchworks.com/
5	Redtray	E-learning software developer	253.19	http://www.redtray.co.uk/
6	ITM Soil	Soil testing equipment maker	249.32	https://web.archive.org/web/20130611201638/http://itm-ltd.com/
7	Mobile Fun	Online retailer	237.83	http://www.mobilefun.co.uk/
8	Vivo Technologies	Communication accessories provider	204.30	http://www.pdamods.com/
9	Assima	E-learning software publisher	195.02	http://www.assima.net/
10	Latitude	Digital marketing agency	191.42	https://web.archive.org/web/20081123044923/http://www.searchlatitude.com//

=== 2005 top ten rankings ===
2005 top ten rankings
Ranking	Company Name	Business Activity	Sales growth (% per annum)	Notes
1	Daisy Communications	Telecoms service provider	457.77	http://www.daisycommunications.co.uk/
2	iFone	Wireless games publisher	357.94	https://web.archive.org/web/20100126033753/http://www.ifone.com/
3	Intelligent Energy	Clean power systems developer	327.09	http://www.intelligent-energy.com/
4	Total PDA	Online multimedia retailer	288.11	http://www.totalpda.co.uk/
5	Marketpipe	Financial software developer	271.41	http://www.marketpipe.com/
6	Gamma Telecom	Telecoms network operator	261.32	http://www.gammatelecom.com/
7	Betfair	Online bookmaker	231.00	http://www.betfaircorporate.com/
8	MX Telecom	Wireless technology developer	228.91	http://www.mxtelecom.com/
9	Clearswift	Security software developer	215.75	http://www.clearswift.com/
10	Argogroup	Testing software developer	211.26	http://www.argogroup.com/

== Other Fast Track publications ==
Tech Track 100 is one of seven league tables of private companies produced by "Fast Track" and published in The Sunday Times:

- Fast Track 100 – ranks the UK’s fastest-growing private companies based on sales (excluding TMT companies, which appear in Tech Track 100)
- SME Export Track 100 – ranks the UK's SMEs with the fastest-growing international sales
- Tech Track 100 – ranks the UK’s fastest-growing private technology companies based on sales (the sister table to Fast Track 100)
- International Track 200 – ranks the UK’s private mid-market companies with the fastest-growing overseas sales
- Profit Track 100 – ranks the UK’s private companies with the fastest-growing profits
- Top Track 250 – ranks the UK’s leading mid-market private companies based on sales and/or profits growth
- Top Track 100 – ranks the UK’s biggest private companies based on sales
