= Robert Braithwaite (engineer) =

British engineer (1943–2019)

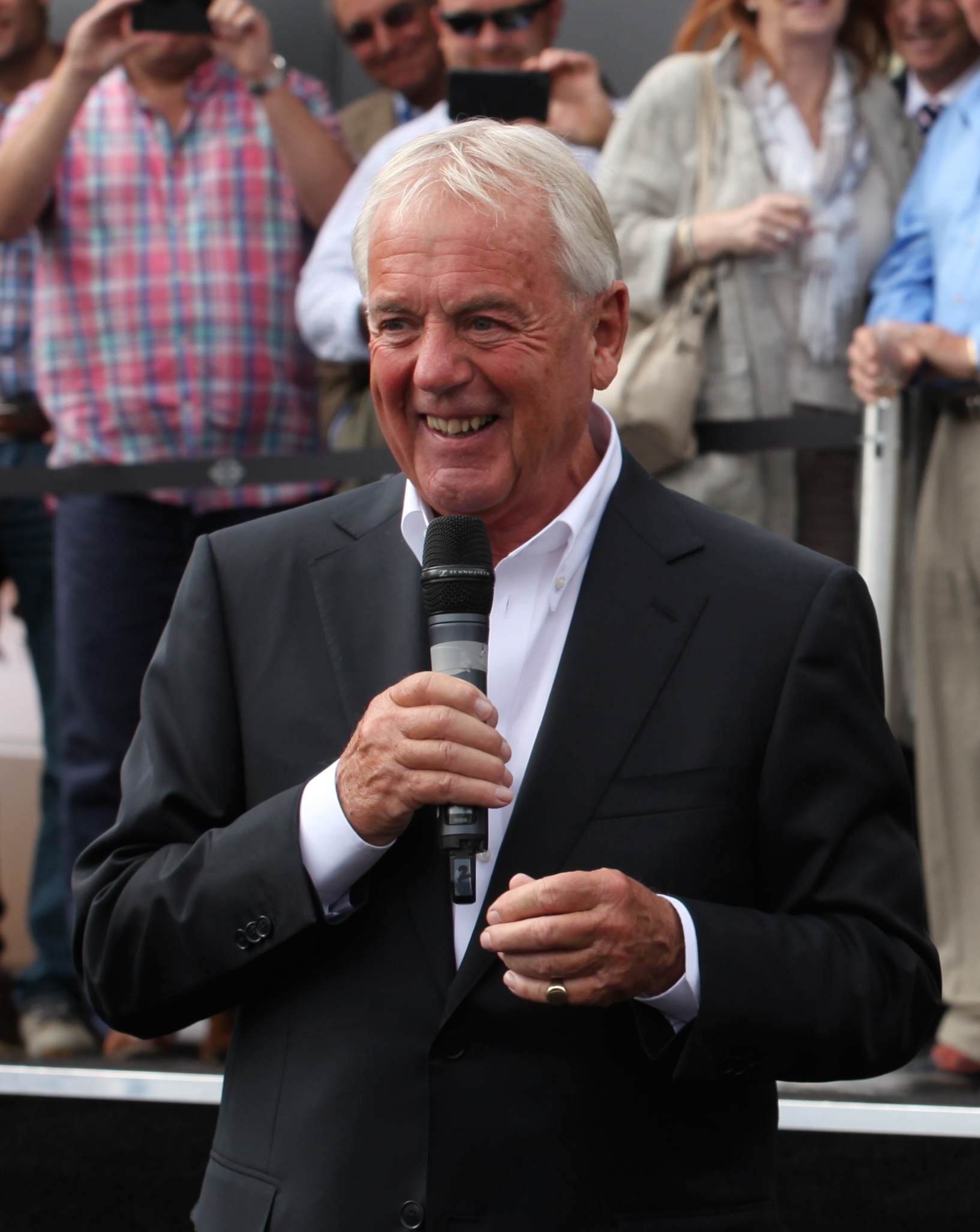
Robert Braithwaite at Southampton Boat Show September 2014

Robert Braithwaite CBE DL (12 May 1943 – 7 March 2019) was a British entrepreneur, marine engineer and Founder and President of the luxury powerboat manufacturer, alongside John Macklin, Sunseeker.

== Biography ==
Born in Otley Moor, Yorkshire, Braithwaite left school at 15 with no qualifications and moved to the Hampshire coast where his parents became proprietors of a village store near Christchurch. Following his dream to build boats he spent a few years servicing outboard engines and did an engineering course before completing a six-month apprenticeship at marine engine suppliers OMC in Belgium.

Originally importers and distributors of boats from Scandinavia and the United States, Poole Powerboats, as Sunseeker was formerly known, created the foundations for its future luxury powerboats. Braithwaite and Macklin borrowed £5,000 to build their first boat – a 17 footer and then following collaboration with hull race-boat designer Don Shead, Sunseeker quickly expanded into the growing Mediterranean market. Braithwaite grew Sunseeker by continuing to expand its shipyards in Poole and create a widening global distributor network.

In 1992 he was awarded an MBE for his services to the marine industry.

In 2002, Braithwaite was awarded Ernst & Young UK Entrepreneur of the Year and he was appointed a Commander of the Order of the British Empire (CBE) in the Queen’s Birthday Honors in 2007. After Sunseeker appeared in four consecutive James Bond films, Braithwaite was asked to appear in a cameo role in the film Quantum of Solace. The scene with Robert Braithwaite was filmed on location in Italy in April 2008, and features James Bond in a Sunseeker Sovereign 17, one of the company’s very first open cockpit speedboats.

In June 2013, it was announced that the Chinese conglomerate Dalian Wanda Group had agreed to buy a 91.8% stake in Sunseeker for £320m. Robert Braithwaite continued as president whilst supporting and growing his personal charitable foundation The Autumn Trust.

== Personal life ==
Braithwaite lived in Devon and Poole, was married, he had two daughters and four grandchildren

== Death and legacy ==
Braithwaite died of complications arising from Alzheimer's disease in the early hours of 7 March 2019, aged 75.
