= Profit Track 100 =

Annual British league table

Sunday Times Profit Track 100 logo

The Sunday Times Profit Track 100 is an annual league table published in association with The Sunday Times newspaper in the UK. It ranks Britain's 100 private companies with the fastest-growing profits over their last three years. It is published in The Sunday Times each April, with an awards event typically held in June, and alumni dinners during the year. The league table is researched and produced by Fast Track, an Oxford-based research and networking events business.

== About Fast Track ==
Fast Track is a leading research and events company that has built a network of the UK's top-performing private companies, from the fastest-growing to the biggest, through its rankings in The Sunday Times. Founded in 1997 by Hamish Stevenson, it now publishes seven annual league tables and brings company founders and directors together at invitation-only networking awards events and alumni dinners.

== Entry criteria ==
Companies have to meet the criteria below to be able to qualify for the Profit Track 100 league table:

- UK registered, unquoted, and not subsidiaries
- Profits of at least £500,000 in the base year trading (latest year minus 3 years)
- Profits of at least £3m in the latest year
- Profits are defined as operating profits before exceptional items
- Profits must increase in the latest year
- Trading weeks in the base and latest years have to exceed 25

Companies that do not meet the criteria can still be considered for the Ones to Watch programme. This is a selection of companies that have either achieved, or predict, good profit growth.

Exclusions

Excluded companies include pure property and financial trading companies, and those with restricted accounts; companies that are equal joint ventures, or majority-owned by quoted or other companies

== Notable alumni companies ==
Profit Track 100 was launched in 2000 to recognise Britain's private companies with the fastest growing profits. Since then, 1,500 companies have appeared on the league table, including:

- Dyson first featured in 2000 having grown profits from £4.3m to profits of £24.3m. In 2018, profits exceeded £1bn on global sales of £4.4bn.
- EG Group, the fuel forecourt operator, made its debut in 2008 with profits of £4.9m. It was valued at £1.3bn in 2015 and has since expanded across America and Australia, reporting profits of £264.5m in 2018.
- Travel search engine Skyscanner, featured in 2015 with profits of £17.7m and was acquired for £1.4bn by Chinese travel group Ctrip in 2016.
- King.com, the gaming website operator behind the Candy Crush Saga, featured in 2010 with profits of £4.7m. It floated on the NYSE in 2014 valued at $7.1bn, and was acquired by Activision Blizzard in 2015 for $5.9bn.

== Latest Profit Track 100 league table ==
The 21st annual Sunday Times Profit Track 100 league table supplement was due to be published on 5 April 2020. However, given the impact of the coronavirus pandemic, Fast Track delayed publication in order to liaise with the featured companies. Out of the original 100 companies, 70 explicitly asked to feature, and 30 did not want to be included. In addition to the league table ranking, the supplement highlighted the positive actions that some companies took to support their staff, local communities, the NHS and key workers during the initial stages of the pandemic. The number one ranked company was fitness clothing retailer Gymshark, which grew its operating profits from £1.1m in 2016 to £18.6m in 2019.

== Yearly Winners ==
Year	Company Name	Category	Profit Growth (3 year average)	Latest Profits (£000s)
2000	JobServe	Internet Recruitment publisher	124.14%	7,250
2001	Hazell Carr	Actuarial Services Provider	114.24%	14,472
2002	Complete Communications	TV and Film Producer	177.50%	15,359
2003	Apple Corps	Music Rights Owner	194.06%	18,234
2004	The Entertainment Group	Film Distributor	196.85%	61,558
2005	Binomial	Insurance Underwriter	159.30%	13,556
2006	HESCO Bastion	Defence Barrier Maker	236.04%	35,598
2007	Virgin Money	Bank	147.00%	9,117
2008	AFI Uplift	Construction equipment supplier	114.24%	5,402
2009	Merlin Entertainment	Visitor Attraction operator	129.66%	127,400
2010	Mayday Healthcare	Recruitment Consultancy	166.54%	9,704
2011	R&R Ice Cream	Ice Cream Manufacturer	210.22%	43,439
2012	Partnership Assurance	Life Assurance Specialist	210.53%	37,701
2013	Partnership Assurance	Life Assurance Specialist	176.36%	66,970
2014	The Hut Group	Online Retailer	178.03%	10,853
2015	The Hut Group	Online Retailer	216.58%	15,959
2016	Anesco	Energy Efficiency Consultancy	179.15%	20,706
2017	Paymentsense	Payment processing services	203%	14,000
2018	Dreams	Bed manufacturer and retailer	166.89%	34,505
2019	Loveholidays	Online travel agency	190.96%	13,350
2020	Gymshark	Fitness clothing retailer	156.20%	18,565

== Other Fast Track publications ==
Profit Track 100 is one of seven league tables of private companies produced by Fast Track and published in The Sunday Times:

- Fast Track 100 – ranks the UK's fastest-growing private companies based on sales (excluding TMT companies, which appear in Tech Track 100 (see below)
- SME Export Track 100 – ranks the UK's SMEs with the fastest-growing international sales
- Tech Track 100 – ranks the UK's fastest-growing private technology companies based on sales (the sister table to Fast Track 100)
- International Track 200 – ranks the UK's private mid-market companies with the fastest-growing overseas sales
- Profit Track 100 – ranks the UK's private companies with the fastest-growing profits
- Top Track 250 – ranks the UK's leading mid-market private companies based on sales and/or profits growth
- Top Track 100 – ranks the UK's biggest private companies based on sales
