= Liz Houghton =

British entrepreneur

- Occupation: Entrepreneur
- Known for: CEO & Founder of Mint Velvet

Liz Houghton is a British entrepreneur and the CEO and founder of women's clothing retailer Mint Velvet.

== Early life and education ==
Houghton was born in Buckinghamshire, as the youngest of four children. Her father was a nuclear scientist and watercolor artist, and her mother an optician. As a child, she suffered with dyslexia.

After completing her A Levels, Houghton went to Loughborough University to study social administration, before taking interest in becoming a buyer.

== Career ==
Houghton started her career as a corporate trainee in the Burton Group (now Arcardia) working for Topshop and Principles, where she was the Brand Director.

=== Mint Velvet ===
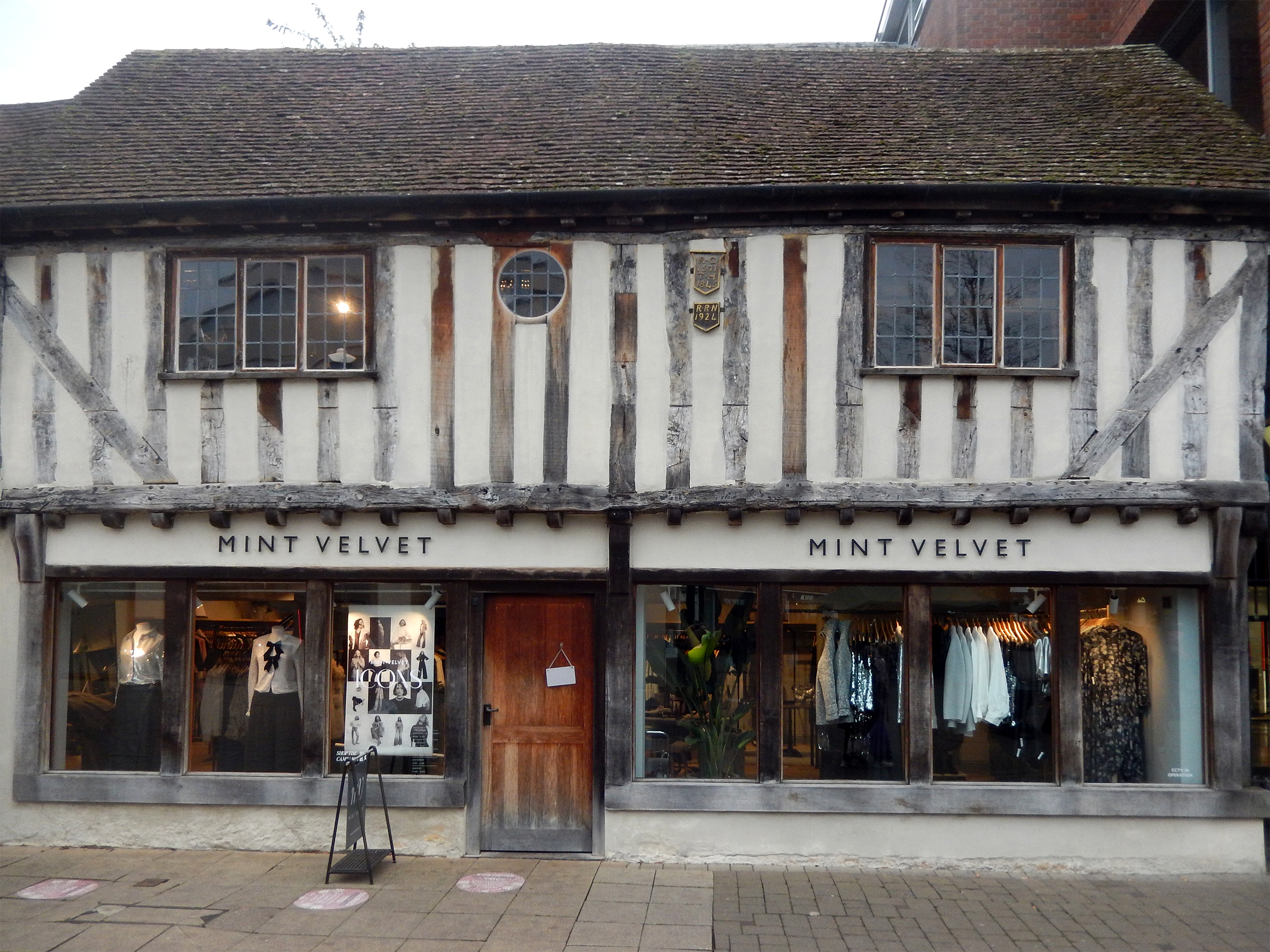
Branch of Mint Velvet in Solihull

In October 2009, Houghton and her Principle colleagues Lisa Agar-Rea and Jane Rawlings founded Mint Velvet. In 2013 and 2014, the company was awarded Fast Track 100 awards as one of Britain's fastest growing private companies.

=== Will Houghton Foundation ===
In 2016, Houghton's eldest son, Will, was tragically killed in a bike accident at 20 years old. Will's wish was to donate all his organs, so Liz ensured this was carried out,. After his death, the family set up the Will Houghton Foundation, working with UK charities to help 14–24 year olds to reach their potential through education and sport.

==== "Don’t forget the Donor” campaign ====
Houghton was keen to know that her son's organs had transformed other families in need and sought to find out via the existing channels. However, she was disappointed to learn that few recipients are encouraged to feedback, often because they do not feel equipped to do so. Houghton then set up the “Don’t forget the Donor” campaign with NHS Blood and Transplant to help both the recipients with how to feedback, and the donor families to create some peace after losing a loved one whilst still honoring the anonymity of donation.

== Awards ==
- 2017 - Officer of the Order of the British Empire (OBE) award
