= Astbury Marsden =

International recruitment firm

Astbury Marsden is an international recruitment firm delivering mid to senior level talent to financial services, energy and professional services clients. The firm has offices are in London and Singapore.

Astbury Marsden focuses on business technology, business transformation, regulatory and assurance, and specialist and technical services.

== Timeline ==
- 1995 – Launch of Astbury Marsden, focused on finance in the banking market.
- 1997 – Introduction of a technology offering.
- 2003 – Technology Contracts team begins. Launch of international offering from London.
- 2004 – Advisory division and Finance Contracts services introduced. Investors in People recognition.
- 2005 – Company achieves ISO 9001 accreditation.
- 2006 – Recognised by The Sunday Times Virgin Fast Track as one of the UK's fastest growing private companies.
- 2007 – Appeared on The Sunday Times Virgin Fast Track list for the 2nd year running. The company completes an MBO.
- 2008 – Opens Hong Kong office. Recognised in the Real Business Hot 100
- 2009 – Recognised as one of Britain's Top Employers and by Best Companies.
- 2010 – Bronze Investors in People status. Opens Singapore office.
- 2012 – Expanded offering with the introduction of our oil and gas desk in London. 2 star recognition by Best Companies.
- 2013 – Astbury Marsden acquired by Havisham Lane Limited in April 2013.

== Awards ==
The organisation has achieved a Bronze Investors in People award.

== See also ==
- Royce Consultancy
