= Trans Global Projects Group =

United Kingdom Freight and Logistics company

Trans Global Projects
- Industry: Project logistics, freight forwarding, transport, logistics management
- Founded: 1988
- Headquarters: Kent, England
- Key people: Colin Charnock (Group CEO); Andrew Herbert (Group CFO); Matt Jackson (Group CCO); Peter Fritschi (Group COO); Simon Duke (CEO, Middle East & Asia-Pacific); Steve Hutty (Group Chartering Director)
- Subsidiaries: Natco AG
- Website: www.tglobal.com

Trans Global Projects, also known simply as TGP, is a UK-based corporate group with activities in the project logistics and freight forwarding sectors. The company is headquartered in Kent, England, with offices across six continents.

Industry sectors served by TGP include Oil & Gas, Power Generation and Transmission, Mining & Metals, Industrial Gases, Construction & Infrastructure, Renewable Energy, Construction & Infrastructure, Industrial and Pipes.

In addition to project logistics, the company's core activities encompass ship chartering, aviation logistics, logistics consultancy and transport engineering. TGP also offers a wide spectrum of services in global freight forwarding, supply chain management and integrated logistics as well as value-added services such as biosecurity, procurement, customs brokerage and insurance.

== History ==
Trans Global Projects was founded in January 1988 as a subsidiary of the Trans Global Group, one of the UK's largest independent multimodal transport organisations. One year after its founding, TGP embarked on a global expansion programme, opening its first overseas office in Antwerp in 1989. In 1999, the company won its first “mega project” on the giant Karachaganak Gas Condensate project in Western Kazakhstan. The $220 million US contract ran for five years, and during that time, TGP was responsible for the movement of 1.6 million tonnes of cargo as well as managing all logistics-related services on the project.

TGP took the next step in its development in 2007, when Breezeline International Group Ltd, a co-investor owned by members of the senior management team, acquired full ownership of the TGP group of companies.

In December 2013, TGP was ranked the 64th fastest growing private company in the UK in a Fast Track 100 report. The company was also ranked the second largest in the Fast Track 100 league table in terms of its annual turnover.

In 2015, TGP continued its substantial growth, acquiring the Swiss logistics specialist Natco AG. Two years later, TGP acquired Germany's Natco GmbH and became a majority stakeholder in the Brazilian transport company NPT Brasil Projetos & Transportes Internacionais LTDA (NPT), which was later renamed to TGP Brasil.

In 2018, TGP was awarded the contract for project logistics management for a shipment of equipment and construction materials to the British Antarctic Survey’s (BAS) Rothera Research Station at Rothera Point by BAM, a global construction and engineering company. The equipment and materials were to be used to build a new wharf to house the UK's new state-of-the-art polar research vessel RSS Sir David Attenborough. TGP successfully delivered the first Arctic shipment in January 2019, and as a result of this Antarctica project's success, the company was shortlisted for "Excellence in Engineering" at the 2019 Heavy Lift Awards. In January 2020, the Group once again returned to the polar region, completing a delivery to the sub-Antarctic island of South Georgia. This shipment included construction material to modernise the British Antarctic Research Station at King Edward Point as well as build a new berthing facility to accommodate RRS Sir David Attenborough.

In 2021, TGP continued to grow its focus on the renewable energy industry and secured a contract for the transport of approximately 320,000 freight tons of wind turbine components. Over the nearly year-long contract, TGP delivered 57 sets of 3 MW offshore turbines for two wind farm projects in Vietnam.

In 2022, TGP was contracted to support Invictus Energy Limited’s first-of-its-kind oil and gas exploration project in northern Zimbabwe with the delivery of time-critical equipment from Australia to the drill site.

In 2023, TGP celebrated its 35th anniversary.

In 2025, Trans Global Projects (TGP) received the Heavy Lift Award for Airfreight Solution of the Year. The award recognised a project involving the transport of a 6-metric-tonne, 4.3-metre slewing ring from Germany to China within six weeks. To facilitate the shipment, the project team designed a custom transport frame and used the available diagonal clearance inside a Boeing 777F cargo aircraft. According to TGP, the shipment represented the largest single-piece cargo by external dimensions transported on a Boeing 777F at the time.
