= Javad Marandi =

British businessman and property developer (born 1968)

Javad Marandi OBE
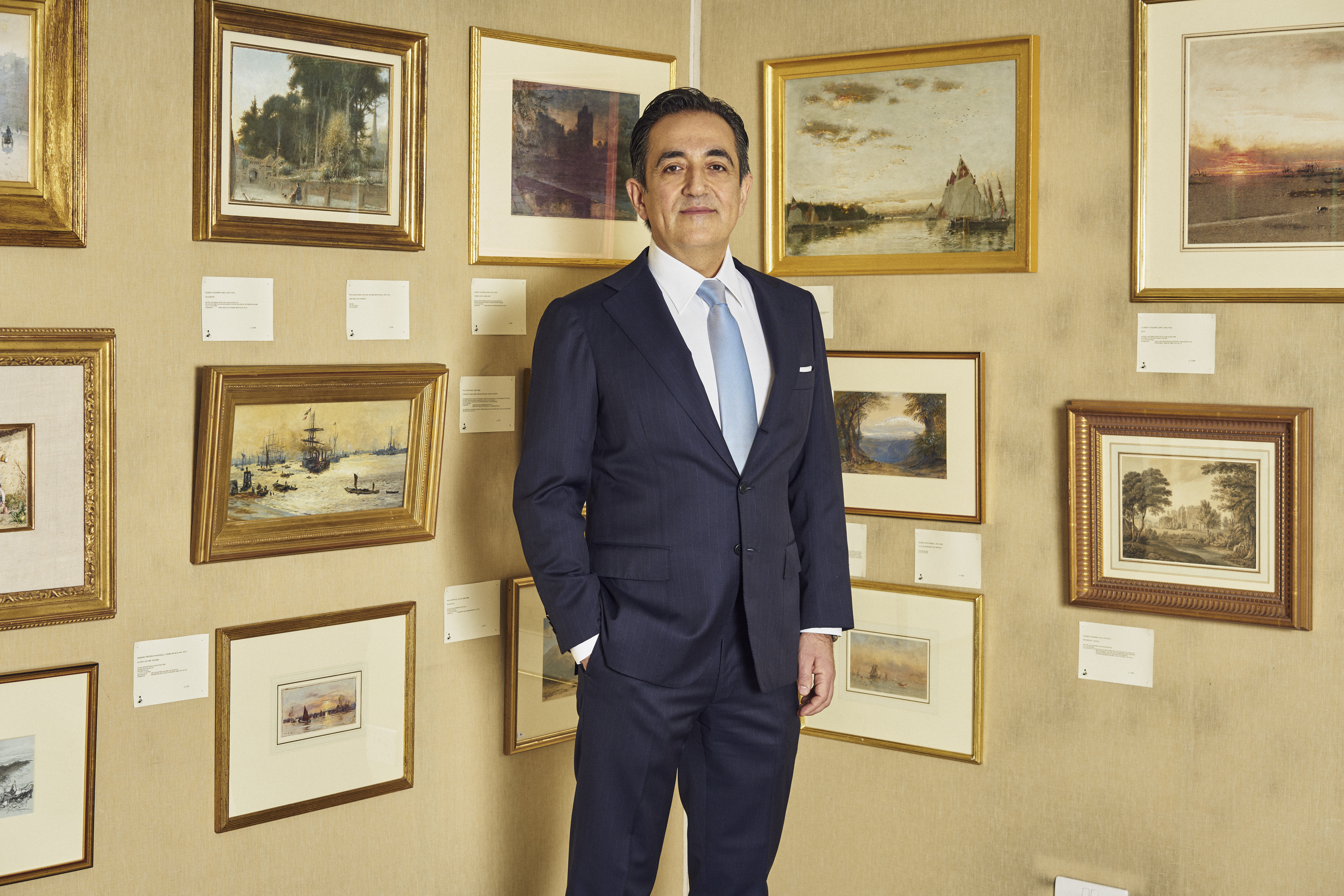
- Born: February 1968 (age 58); Tehran, Iran
- Occupations: Businessman and property developer
- Spouse: Narmina Alizadeh
- Children: 3

Javad Marandi (born February 1968) is an Iranian-born, British businessman, property developer and Conservative Party donor, with investments in commercial and residential real estate.

== Early life ==
Marandi was born in February 1968, in Tehran, Iran. He moved to Britain in 1979, and studied Electrical and Electronics Engineering. Marandi then qualified as a UK chartered accountant, at Coopers & Lybrand (now part of PricewaterhouseCoopers). In the 1990s, he worked as a business development manager for The Coca-Cola Company in Central Asia, and the area manager for emerging markets at Philip Morris International, before starting his own businesses in tobacco distribution, advertising and telecommunications, eventually holding the franchise agreement for McDonald's in Azerbaijan.

== Investments ==
=== Property ===
Marandi has invested in numerous establishments within the hospitality sector, including hotels such as Soho Farmhouse, Soho House group's country hotel and club in Oxfordshire, England, Chais Monnet, a 92-room hotel, restaurant and retail development in Cognac, France, Sofitel Brussels, and CenterParc in Moselle, France. Marandi is both an investor and developer in the UK property market.

=== Retail ===
In 2014, Marandi took a majority stake in Wed2B, a UK mid-market wedding apparel retailer, focused on regional UK towns and cities. Since his involvement in the business, the company has expanded from three to over 40 stores. Wed2B ranked in the FT1000 in both 2019 and 2020, and placed in the Sunday Times Virgin Fast Track 100 in both 2017 and 2018” It ranks Britain's fastest-growing privately held companies by sales growth over the preceding three years.

In March 2020, the Marandi family acquired 100% of the Conran Shop, the interior design and furniture retailer founded by Sir Terence Conran in 1973.

=== Logistics ===
Marandi held a controlling stake in Roth Gerueste, a Swiss market scaffolding and hi-tech building materials manufacturer until early 2021. Lux Magazine published an interview with him in 2016 on investing in Switzerland.

== Legal disputes ==
In May 2023, Marandi lost a 19-month legal battle with the BBC to remain anonymous regarding a National Crime Agency (NCA) global money laundering investigation. On 16 May 2023, it was reported that the NCA found some of Marandi's overseas interests had been involved in the Azerbaijani laundromat money-laundering scheme.

== Philanthropy ==
The Marandi Foundation supports children's health and education; and cultural history and art. Marandi is also chairman of the advisory board of The Watercolour World, a charity working to provide online public access to thousands of documentary watercolours from all over the world. The goal of the charity is to collate a unique visual history of the world. The Prince of Wales and the Duchess of Cornwall are joint patrons of the Watercolour World, which is chaired by Fred Hohler. In March 2021, Marandi was appointed co-chair to the Growth Board of homelessness charity Centrepoint. In 2021, The Marandi Foundation partnered with the Conran Shop on the New Designer of the Future Award, which supports creative talent denoting an accolade and a £40,000 in investment money to further develop the winner's ideas.

== Personal life ==
In 2013 the Marandi family, one of Azerbaijan's richest, was thought to live in a house in Eaton Square in London's Belgravia sold in 2007 for £3.8 million, and in 2010 for £20.5 million. This led to legal difficulties. Marandi was reported to have "two private jets and a passion for vintage wine".

He donates to the Conservative Party. He donated £756,300 between 2014 and 2020 and £250,000 during the 2019 United Kingdom general election campaign.

His wife Narmina is the daughter of Ali Alizadeh, an oncologist in Baku, Azerbaijan. Javad and Narmina are investors in Anya Hindmarch and Emilia Wickstead, the London-based fashion houses. Narmina is a co-chair of the British Fashion Council Foundation as well as a patron and board member of the BFC Fashion Trust and co-head of the Cultural and Social Committee of the Serpentine Galleries.

Marandi was appointed Officer of the Order of the British Empire (OBE) in the 2020 New Year Honours for services to business and philanthropy.
