= Lenstore =

Online optical retailer

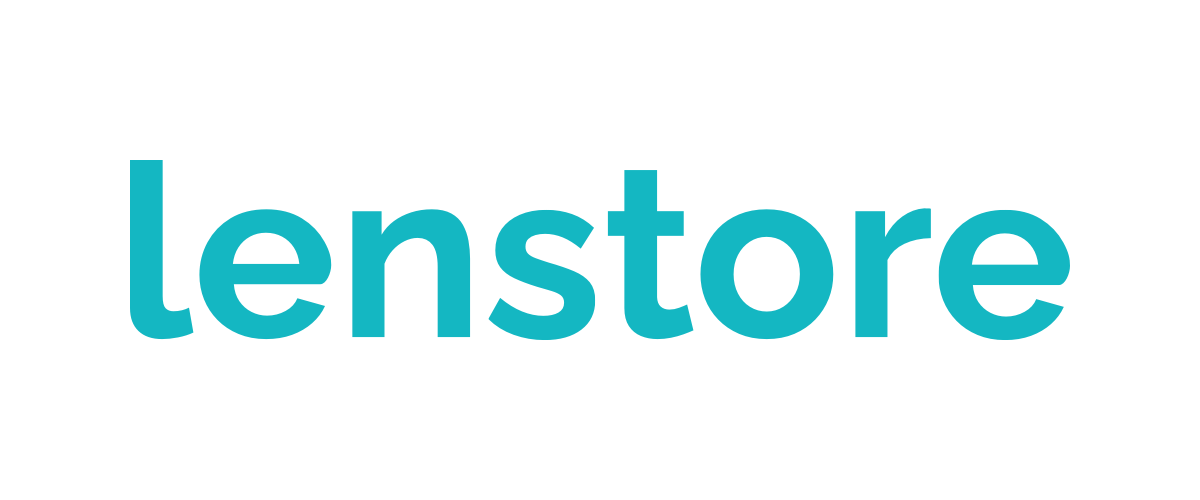
- Company type: Private company
- Industry: Online retailer
- Founded: 2008; 18 years ago
- Headquarters: Kensington, London, United Kingdom
- Area served: UK, Germany, Italy, France, Spain
- Key people: Mitesh Patel, Founder
- Products: Contact lenses
- Parent: EssilorLuxottica
- Website: www.lenstore.co.uk

Lenstore is a British online optical retailer, specialising in contact lenses and eye care products.

== History ==
Lenstore was founded on 3 January 2008 by Oxford graduate, Mitesh Patel. The website went live on 11 June 2008 and by 2012 the company had entered the Sunday Times Fast Track 100 in 10th place. Lenstore had served over 100,000 customers by 2013, despite not being the only online-only lens and glasses retailer in the UK. This growth was aided by a desire in the UK to buy lenses cheaper, and not just from high street opticians. Guides were subsequently created to help UK customers identify the correct lens to purchase online (as high street opticians would often rebrand lenses).

In late 2013, the start-up was acquired by GrandVision. This saw Lenstore become a sister company to UK high-street optician Vision Express, allowing the company to offer customers face-to-face eye care. A version of the Lenstore website was launched in Germany in 2016.

== In the media ==
In April 2018 Lenstore & Nikon created the world's first gigapixel timelapse, with London as the subject. The 7.3 gigapixel timelapse was taken from the top of Canary Wharf using a Nikon D850 camera and a Nikon AF-S NIKKOR 300mm lens.

In 2019 Lenstore teamed up with charity Colour Blindness Awareness UK to highlight the plight of people with colour blindness by showcasing how they see the world. The campaign highlighted 3 different types of colour blindness including Tritanopia, Protanopia and Deuteranopia.
