= Pharmalink Consulting =

Pharmalink Consulting is a Global regulatory affairs consultancy based in UK, US, India, Singapore and Latin America which provides regulatory expertise and resource to the healthcare industry.

== History ==
Founded in the UK in 1998, Pharmalink Consulting now has offices across Europe, USA, Asia and Latin America, serving the Healthcare Industry. Pharmalink Consulting works across all of the main healthcare sectors, including pharmaceutical, consumer healthcare, generics, medical devices and biologics. It now works with 18 of the top 20 healthcare companies in the world.

In 2006 and 2007, Pharmalink Consulting was ranked in the top 100 fastest growing UK companies in a survey carried out by The New York Times newspaper. In 2009, Pharmalink Consulting established its "Pharmalink Affiliate Network ("PAN Global"), providing local regulatory expertise in over 115 countries worldwide. In 2013, Pharmalink Consulting achieved recognition in both the UK and US as one of the Top 20 "Best Places to Work".
