= Royce Consultancy =

- Type: Subsidiary
- Industry: Pharmaceutical recruitment Contract sales organization (CSO)
- Founded: 1983
- Fate: Acquired by Quintiles in 1998
- Area served: United Kingdom
- Services: Pharmaceutical recruitment; Contract sales services; Healthcare recruitment; Medical representative staffing
- Parent: Quintiles

The Royce Consultancy the United Kingdom's leading privately held pharmaceutical sales representative recruitment and contract sales organisation (CSO).

== History ==
Royce Consultancy was founded in 1983 and is the largest healthcare and pharmaceutical recruitment company in the UK. Their services range from medical representatives to NHS management roles and from nurse advisor to healthcare sales positions. In August 1998, Royce was acquired by Quintiles but continued to operate under the Royce brand alongside Quintiles’ brand name of Innovex.

In 2008, Royce Consultancy was named Pharmatimes "Recruiter of the Year" in the UK.

In recent years, portfolios have shifted from the primary care sector to specialist-driven markets such as oncology. More than 40% of all UK hospital representative positions are now filled by Innovex/Royce. They have built more than 22 secondary or specialist teams in the UK.
