= James Averdieck =

British entrepreneur (born 1965)

- Born: November 1965 (age 60)
- Education: Uppingham School; College of St Hild and St Bede, Durham (BA)
- Occupation: Entrepreneur
- Known for: Founder of Gü and the Coconut Collaborative
- Children: 2

James Averdieck (born November 1965) is a British entrepreneur, the founder of the dessert manufacturer Gü and the Coconut Collaborative.

== Early life ==
Averdieck was born in November 1965. His father was the owner of a textile business. His grandfather also had his own business. He has a twin brother Ed, managing director of Nokia Music and an older brother Will, who is an inventor.

He was educated at Uppingham School, and received a bachelor's degree in economics from the College of St Hild and St Bede at Durham University in 1988.

== Career ==
Averdieck worked for the food companies Safeway and St Ivel for ten years. He founded Gü in 2003, and in 2010 sold it to Noble Foods for £32.5 million.

In 2014, he bought a majority stake in Bessant and Drury, a small dairy-free ice cream company, which he rebranded as the Coconut Collaborative. The company produces ice cream and other desserts using coconut milk or almond milk instead of dairy. Its products are produced and sold in the United Kingdom, France, Germany, New Zealand and the United States.

== Personal life ==
Averdieck married Annie Geddes in 1993, with whom he has two children. He married Charlotte Knight on 6 December 2018 at St. Margaret, Kilmersdon, Somerset, England.
