= TDX Group =

- Industry: Data and technology services in the debt industry
- Founded: Nottingham, UK (2004)
- Founder: Mark Onyett
- Headquarters: 8 Fletcher Gate, Nottingham, NG1 2FS, United Kingdom,
- Key people: Patricio Remon (President, Europe)
- Owner: Equifax
- Website: www.tdxgroup.com

TDX Group is a data and technology company that provides creditors platforms, tools and services to maximise returns from debt portfolios. TDX Group was founded in 2004 by Mark Onyett. TDX Group was acquired by Equifax in 2014.

TDX Creditor Solutions core technology platforms are used for the management and streamlining of debt collection, debt sale and insolvencies by creditors from the following industries: financial services, telecommunications, media., utilities, public sector and healthcare. TDX Group also offers advisory services to creditors looking to review their existing debt management processes.

== History ==
In 2008 TDX Group secured an investment from Investcorp Technology Partners, the technology private equity arm of alternative investment manager Investcorp.

In January 2014, Equifax acquired TDX Group from Investcorp for $327 million.

TDX Group employs over 300 people globally with its head office based in Nottingham, UK, and international operations across Spain, South America, Australia and North America. The UK company is split into two main divisions, TDX Creditor Solutions and TDX Industry Solutions.

== Awards and accreditation ==
- 2008: ranked 11th in The Sunday Times Fast Track 100 table of the UK’s top-performing private companies with the fastest-growing sales
- 2008, 2009, 2011 and 2012: named in the top fifty best places to work in the UK, in a survey conducted by the Great Place to Work® Institute
- 2009: awarded ‘Best Use of Technology – In-House Solutions’ at the Credit Today Awards for what has evolved to become PLATO
- 2011: shortlisted for Credit Today Consumer Credit Team of the Year and Advertisement of the Year
- 2011: shortlisted for Compliance Team of the Year at the Credit Today Debt Collections Awards
- 2011: winners of Innovation of the Year at the Credit Today Debt Collections Awards
- 2013: winners of Credit Marketing Campaign of the Year at the Credit Today Awards
- 2014: winners of Contribution to the Community Award at the Nottingham Post Business Awards
- 2014: shortlisted for Best Use of Technology – Supplier at the Credit Today Awards
- 2014: winners of Corporate Social Responsibility Initiative at the Credit Today Awards
