= Just Group plc =

British company

- Type: Public limited company
- Traded as: LSE: JUST
- Industry: Financial services
- Founded: 2004; 22 years ago
- Headquarters: Enterprise House, Bancroft Road, Reigate, United Kingdom
- Key people: John Hastings-Bass (Chairman); David Richardson (CEO)
- Revenue: ▲£2,073 million (2025)
- Operating income: ▼£(118) million (2025)
- Net income: ▼£(99) million (2025)
- Subsidiaries: Just Retirement
- Website: www.justgroupplc.co.uk

Just Group plc (formerly JRP Group plc and, before that, Just Retirement Group plc) is a British company specialising in retirement products and services headquartered in London. It was listed on the London Stock Exchange and was a constituent of the FTSE 250 Index until it was acquired by Brookfield Wealth Solutions, a spin-off majority-owned by Brookfield Corporation, in March 2026.

== History ==
The company, which was established as Just Retirement in 2004, was listed on the Alternative Investment Market until it was bought out by Permira in 2009. It launched a fixed-term product that links with enhanced annuity rates in 2011 and then set up a pensions de-risking arm in 2012. It went on to join the long term care market and to offer individually underwritten annuities in 2013. The company was the subject of an initial public offering in November 2013.

In April 2016 the company merged with Partnership Assurance and was renamed JRP Group. In May 2017 the company changed its name to Just Group plc.

In July 2025, Brookfield Wealth Solutions, a spin-off majority-owned by Brookfield Corporation, agreed to take over Just Group for £2.4 billion. The transaction was approved by the court on 27 March 2026, so allowing the takeover to complete.

== Operations ==
The company started as a provider of annuities to retirees with serious health conditions such as heart disease and to heavy smokers. The products pay out a higher income than the usual products. It now offers a Defined Benefits De-risking Solution, and also owns a corporate advice business, HUB Financial Solutions, which offers an automated retirement advice service.

In 2021, the company applied its medical underwriting technology to its lifetime mortgage products that allow people aged 55+ to access wealth locked up in their property.

David Richardson has been Group CEO since September 2019, having previously been Just's deputy CEO and CFO of Partnership. Mark Godson is the Group CFO.

Its board includes John Hastings-Bass as Group Chair, and Michelle Cracknell, former CEO of the Pensions Advisory Service, the Government's information and guidance service for members of the public on state, company and personal pensions (now the Money and Pensions Service).

== Sustainability ==
In 2020, Just Group launched the first Green Bond issued by a UK insurer and its first Green Lifetime Mortgage. In 2021, the company issued a Sustainability RT1 Bond, the first of its kind in the UK and European insurance sector.

Just Group became the first UK asset owner to join the Principles for Responsible Investment and was listed as a signatory of the UK Stewardship Code by the Financial Reporting Council in 2024.

The company ranked second among Financial Services companies in the Financial Times - Statista list of Europe's Climate Leaders for 2022.

== Sponsorship ==
The company has been the sponsor For the World Bowls Events for 2014, 2015 and 2016. Under the 'Just' brand the company also sponsored the event for 2017 and 2018.

== Prudential Regulation Authority proposals ==
The firm’s share price fell after it announced in its business update on 24 July 2018 that proposals by the Prudential Regulation Authority on the valuation of equity release mortgages could, if implemented, result in a reduction in the firm's regulatory capital position.

In March 2022, the company reintroduced dividend payments to investors after it had halted the payments in 2018 while it made necessary changes to its balance sheet to comply with Solvency II capital requirements.

== Relationship with Age UK ==
In 2019, Just Group was criticised after claims that Age UK was sending users through its commercial arm (Age Co) to an equity release advice service provided by Hub Financial, a company wholly owned by Just. While customers were told that Hub compared deals from a panel of five providers, its advice process was structured so that in most cases a customer would be offered a deal by just one panel member, namely Just.
