= Oak Furnitureland =

British furniture retailer

- Industry: Furniture, retail
- Founded: Chippenham, United Kingdom (2006)
- Headquarters: Swindon, United Kingdom
- Number of locations: 78
- Area served: United Kingdom
- Key people: Alex Fisher (CEO)
- Products: Cabinet and dining furniture, sofas, mattresses, lamps and clocks
- Owner: Davidson Kempner Capital Management
- Number of employees: just under 1200 (2020)
- Website: www.oakfurnitureland.co.uk

Oak Furnitureland is a British furniture retailer specialising in fully assembled hardwood cabinet and dining furniture, and sofa ranges. The company has stores across the UK, with its headquarters in Swindon in Wiltshire, England.

== History ==
Oak Furnitureland was launched through its website on Boxing Day, 2006. The company started in 2003 by selling on eBay. Subsequently, it opened a pop-up shop on Cotswold Airport. Its first store on a retail park was in Chippenham, Wiltshire. The company reported a turnover of £85m and a profit of £9.2m in the year to 30 September 2012.

In late 2012, the business moved its national distribution centre to a 302,000 sq ft building in South Marston near Swindon, Wiltshire.

In an interview with The Sunday Times on 10 January 2015, the firm's then managing director stated that the chain had sales of £194m.

In June 2015, Oak Furnitureland became the principal sponsor and home kit sponsor for association football club Burnley.

In June 2020, Davidson Kempner Capital Management bought Oak Furnitureland out of administration.
