= Partnership Assurance =

Partnership Assurance Group plc
- Company type: Financial services
- Industry: Financial services
- Founded: 1995
- Headquarters: London, United Kingdom
- Key people: Chris Gibson-Smith (Chairman); Steve Groves (CEO)
- Revenue: £452.6 million (2014)
- Operating income: £24.1 million (2014)
- Net income: £18.8 million (2014)
- Website: www.partnership.co.uk

Partnership Assurance Group plc is a provider of non-standard annuities for individuals with medical or lifestyle conditions. In April 2016 it became part of the JRP Group.

== History ==
The company was established as a management buyout of the Pension Annuity Friendly Society with funding from Phoenix Equity Partners in September 2005. Cinven acquired the company in August 2008 and it was the subject of an initial public offering in June 2013. In December 2014, Partnership completed the UK's largest medically underwritten bulk annuity transaction – a £206 million ‘top-slicing’ deal with Taylor Wimpey.

In April 2016 the company merged with Just Retirement to form JRP Group.

== Operations ==
The company is a provider of annuities for people with medical conditions.
