= Noble Foods =

British food company

Noble Foods Ltd
- Industry: Poultry
- Founded: 2006; 20 years ago
- Headquarters: Lincolnshire
- Website: noblefoods.co.uk

Noble Foods is a British poultry company, and the UK's largest egg producer.

The company was founded in 2006 through the merger of Deans Foods and Stonegate. The company subsequently had to divest itself of its Stonegate business after the Competition Commission found that it violated UK antitrust laws.

In 2010, the company acquired a majority share in dessert brand Gü, which they later sold to private equity firm Exponent in 2021.

In 2017 and 2018 The Humane League petitioned Noble Foods over its farming practices, which used caged hens for its Big & Fresh brand. Animal Equality released footage of treatment of hens in Noble Foods' supply chain. Soon after, in March 2018, Noble Foods announced a pledge to go completely cage-free by 2025. Since 2019, they have achieved top tier ranking in the Business Benchmark on Farm Animal Welfare.

In 2024, Noble Foods opened a manufacturing facility in Leicestershire, producing a selection of pre-prepared egg based foods such as omelettes. In June 2025, they acquired Just Egg from Pankaj Pancholi.
