= Gü =

Dessert manufacturing company

Gu Indulgent Foods Limited
- Trade name: Gü
- Formerly: Noble Desserts Holdings Limited (2009–2021)
- Type: Subsidiary
- Industry: Dessert
- Founded: 2003; 23 years ago in London, United Kingdom
- Key people: James Averdieck (Founder and ex director)
- Parent: Exponent Private Equity
- Website: gudesserts.com

Gu Indulgent Foods Limited, trading as Gü (/ɡuː/), is a dessert manufacturing company, whose products are sold in the United Kingdom, Austria, Belgium, Germany, the Netherlands, France, Ireland, Australia, New Zealand, Italy and the United States. The product is made in the UK and was created by James Averdieck.

== Overview ==
=== Launch ===
Gü launched in 2003 with three products: two chocolate mousses and a chocolate soufflé in glass ramekins, developed through a joint venture with a patisserie company in London. The venture had a seed capital of £65,000.

Gü diversified into fruity puddings with a new brand called Frü in 2005, but merged this with the Gü brand in May 2010. In 2007 Gü launched 24 new products.

In 2010, Averdieck collected approximately £9 million after selling Gü to Noble Foods for £32.5 million.

In 2016, Gu began targeting the "on-the-go" lunchtime market by including individual dessert pots as a snack in meal deals in the UK.

=== Sale to Exponent ===
In June 2021, Gü was sold to private equity firm Exponent for an undisclosed sum.

== Products ==
The company's products include ramekin, sharing puds, mini puds and mousses. Various styles are produced, including cheesecakes, puddings and tortes, in various flavours.

A life hack highlighting the near-exact fit of Pringles lids on Gu glass ramekins went viral in 2023, alongside other ways to reuse the ramekins.

== Awards ==
Gü received a Design Week Award.

== See also ==
- List of desserts
