= This Could Be Texas =

2024 debut studio album by English Teacher

Studio album by English Teacher
- Released: 12 April 2024
- Length: 50:25
- Label: Island
- Producer: Marta Salogni

English Teacher chronology
| Polyawkward (2022) | This Could Be Texas (2024) | This Could Be a Remix Album (2025) |

This Could Be Texas is the debut studio album by English indie rock band English Teacher, released on 12 April 2024 through Island Records. It was produced by Marta Salogni. The album drew acclaim from critics and won the 2024 Mercury Prize.

== Critical reception ==
Professional ratings
Aggregate scores
| Source | Rating |
|---|---|
| AnyDecentMusic? | 8.6/10 |
| Metacritic | 88/100 |
Review scores
| Source | Rating |
| AllMusic | 4/5 stars |
| DIY | 5/5 stars |
| The Line of Best Fit | 9/10 |
| Mojo | 4/5 stars |
| MusicOMH | 5/5 stars |
| NME | 5/5 stars |
| Pitchfork | 7.4/10 |
| Record Collector | 5/5 stars |
| The Skinny | 4/5 stars |
| Uncut | 9/10 |

According to the review aggregator Metacritic, This Could Be Texas received "universal acclaim" based on a weighted average score of 88 out of 100 from 15 critic scores. At AnyDecentMusic?, the album scored an 8.6 out of 10, aggregating 19 reviews.

Reviewing the album for AllMusic, Marcy Donelson described it as "chaotic, poignant, pretentious, fascinating, and thoroughly entertaining despite or because of it all." She concluded that "it will be interesting to see how the band try to follow up such a panoptic debut." Uncut stated that "There are surprises everywhere. While 'R&B' and 'Nearly Daffodils' are sprightly, irreverent post-punk, the influence of Black Country, New Road and Radiohead are evident on the complex, proggy title track and the diverse, hushed final third of the album. Lily Fontaine's lyrics [...] are deep and funny". Jack Faulds of The Skinny wrote that This Could be Texas "sees English Teacher beginning to consolidate and take the already-delicious sounds introduced on their Polyawkward EP to even greater heights".

Kieran Macadie of The Line of Best Fit said that it "could be one of the finest debuts of the decade, with every band member shining in their ability and craftsmanship" and highlighted "one particular thing that propels this on listen is something the other bands don't and have and never will – northern charm". DIY called it "an album that unfurls itself with each listen; it is neither easily categorised nor, you suspect, written with quickly-digestible earworms in mind".

NME's Andrew Trendell felt that the "moments of weight are always lifted by joyful and curious twists, the pathos by a human humour, and the mathier bits are never too wanky", describing it as "everything you want from a debut; a truly original effort from start to finish, an adventure in sound and words, and a landmark statement". John Murphy of MusicOMH noted that is "full of confidence, heart and ambition and marks them out as the most exciting new band in the country" and contains "scrappy knockabout rocky anthems and big, enormous ballads with quasi-classical piano that will tear your heart to bits".

In the review for Pitchfork, Caitlin Wolper claimed that "English Teacher can’t leave a song alone: Not a track goes by without a twist or complication, whether a time-signature change, an instrumental flourish, or a sudden wall of sound. .... Most promising, and core to This Could Be Texas, is the band’s interest in melding indie-prog, rock, folk electronica, and post-punk into a new package."

=== Year-end lists ===
Select year-end rankings for This Could Be Texas
| Publication/critic | Accolade | Rank | Ref. |
|---|---|---|---|
| BBC Radio 6 Music | 26 Albums of the Year 2024 | - | |
| MOJO | The Best Albums of 2024 | 15 | |
| Rough Trade UK | Albums of the Year 2024 | 2 | |
| Uncut | 80 Best Albums of 2024 | 27 | |

== Track listing ==
All tracks are written by Nicholas Eden, Lily Fontaine, Douglas Frost, and Lewis Whiting.

This Could Be Texas track listing
| No. | Title | Length |
|---|---|---|
| 1. | "Albatross" | 3:14 |
| 2. | "The World's Biggest Paving Slab" | 3:06 |
| 3. | "Broken Biscuits" | 4:07 |
| 4. | "I'm Not Crying, You're Crying" | 3:48 |
| 5. | "Mastermind Specialism" | 4:41 |
| 6. | "This Could Be Texas" | 4:48 |
| 7. | "Not Everybody Gets to Go to Space" | 4:01 |
| 8. | "R&B" | 2:48 |
| 9. | "Nearly Daffodils" | 3:46 |
| 10. | "The Best Tears of Your Life" | 3:28 |
| 11. | "You Blister My Paint" | 3:57 |
| 12. | "Sideboob" | 4:01 |
| 13. | "Albert Road" | 4:40 |
| Total length: | | 50:25 |

== Personnel ==
Credits adapted from Tidal.

=== English Teacher ===
- Nicholas Eden – bass guitar, piano
- Lily Fontaine – vocals, guitar, harmonium, piano, synthesizer, artwork
- Douglas Frost – vocals, drums, harmonium, percussion, piano, synthesizer, vibraphone
- Lewis Whiting – guitar, percussion, piano, synthesizer

=== Additional contributors ===
- Marta Salogni – production, mixing, programming
- Heba Kadry – mastering
- Grace Banks – engineering
- Gilly Grist – artwork
- Holly Whitaker – photography
- Carlo Salogni – saxophone on "Broken Biscuits"

== Commercial performance ==
As of 25 July 2024, the album sold 12,960 units in the UK.

=== Charts ===
Chart performance for This Could Be Texas
| Chart (2024) | Peak position |
|---|---|
| Belgian Albums (Ultratop Flanders) | 186 |
| Scottish Albums (OCC) | 5 |
| UK Albums (OCC) | 8 |

== Remix album ==
This Could Be a Remix Album

Remix album by English Teacher
- Released: 10 October 2025

English Teacher chronology
| This Could Be Texas (2024) | This Could Be a Remix Album (2025) |

On 7 October 2025, the band announced This Could Be a Remix Album, a remix album featuring producers including Daniel Avery, Water from Your Eyes, and Sherelle. The album was released on 10 October.

=== Track listing ===
This Could Be a Remix Album tracklist
| No. | Title | Length |
|---|---|---|
| 1. | "Albatross (Bug Teeth Remix)" |
| 2. | "The World's Biggest Paving Slab (Daniel Avery Remix)" |
| 3. | "Broken Biscuits (Lewis Whiting Remix)" |
| 4. | "I'm Not Crying, You're Crying (Water from Your Eyes Remix)" |
| 5. | "Mastermind Specialism (Sherelle's 160 Steps to Enlightenment Mix)" |
| 6. | "This Could Be Texas (Baxter Dury Remix)" |
| 7. | "Not Everybody Gets to Go to Space (Working Men's Club Remix)" |
| 8. | "R&B (Max Cooper Remix)" |
| 9. | "Nearly Daffodils (Matt Maltese Rework)" |
| 10. | "Best Tears of Your Life (FDC DJs Remix)" |
| 11. | "You Blister My Paint (Silver Gore Remix)" |
| 12. | "Sideboob (Taahliah Remix)" |
| 13. | "Albert Road (Blossom Caldarone Rework)" |
