= Park High School, Colne =

Park High School

Location
- Venables Avenue; Colne; Lancashire, BB8 7DP; England; 53.86399°N 2.15538°W

Information
- Type: Academy
- Motto: "Nil Sine Labore" (Nothing Without Work)
- Local authority: Lancashire
- Trust: The Pennine Trust
- Department for Education URN: 146228 Tables
- Ofsted: Reports
- Headteacher: Cathy Eulert
- Gender: Coeducational
- Age: 11 to 16
- Enrolment: 1086 as of August 2020.
- Houses: Pegasus, Phoenix, Griffin, Dragon
- Website: Official website

Park High School is a coeducational secondary school located in Colne in the English county of Lancashire.

Previously a community school administered by Lancashire County Council, in September 2018 Park High School converted to academy status and is now sponsored by The Pennine Trust.

The school offers GCSEs as programmes of study for pupils.

== Notable former pupils ==
- Steven Burke – Olympic track and road cyclist who rode for the WIGGINS Team.
- Natalie Gumede – English actress best known for playing China in BBC Three's Ideal and Kirsty Soames in Coronation Street.
- Heather Hancock – Chair of the Food Standards Agency and Master of St John's College, Cambridge as of August 2023.
- Rosemary Lain-Priestley – Church of England priest and former Archdeacon for the Two Cities.
- Lily Fontaine – Lead vocalist and guitarist of the band English Teacher, winners of the 2024 Mercury Prize with the debut studio album, This Could Be Texas.
