= Jennings Motor Group =

S Jennings Ltd
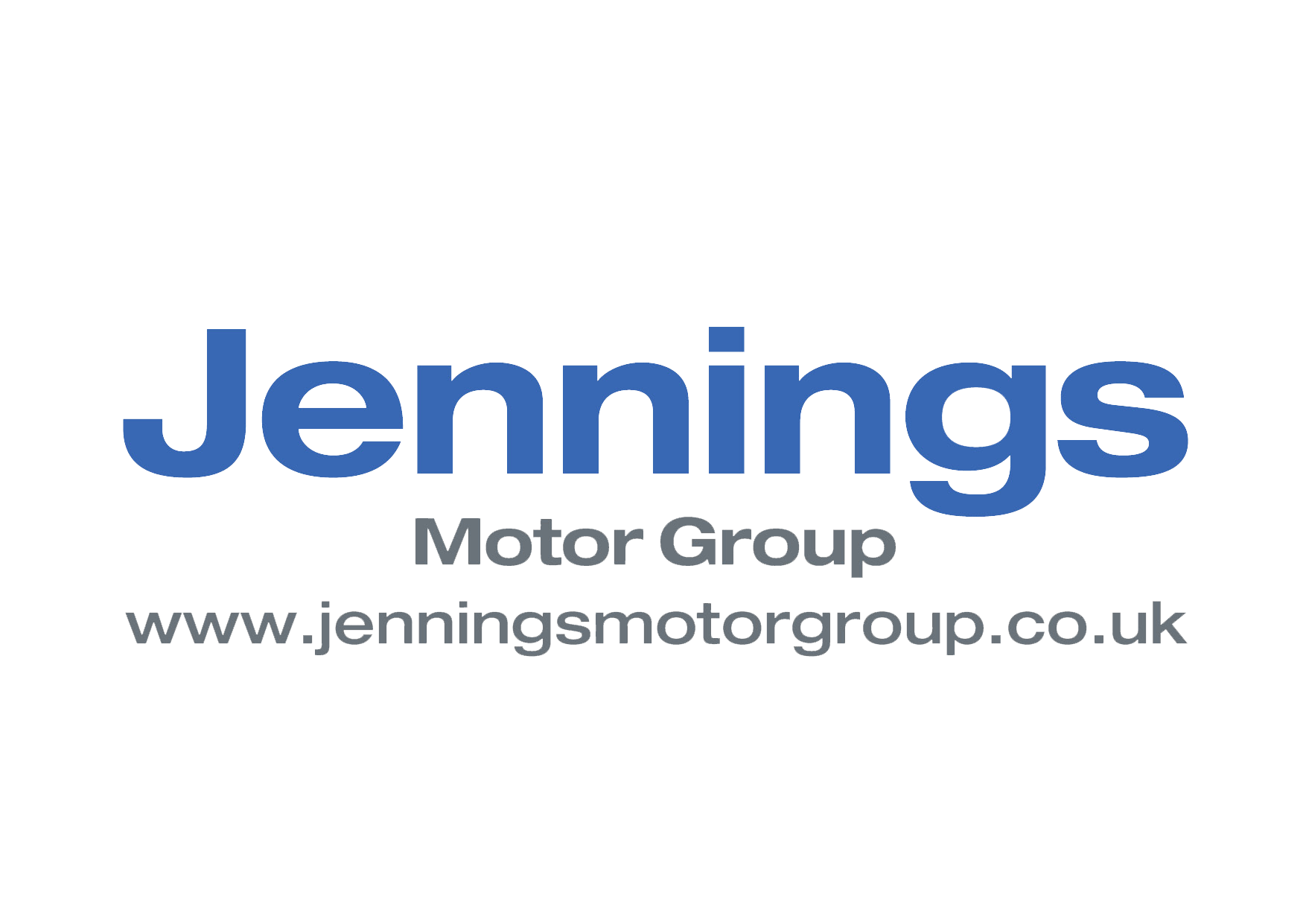
- Jennings Motor Group Logo

About
- Type: Limited Company
- Trading as: Jennings Motor Group
- Jennings Ford
- Jennings Ford Direct
- Jennings Kia
- Jennings Mazda
- Jennings Mitsubishi
- Jennings Seat
- Leeds Harley-Davidson
- Jennings Harley-Davidson

Information
- Industry: Car Sales
- Motorcycle Sales
- Founded: 1890
- Headquarters: Washington, Tyne and Wear, United Kingdom
- Key People: Nas Khan OBE Managing Director
- Sohail Khan
- Products: Vehicles
- Turnover: £145.8m (2014) & £172.3m (2015)

Website
- Official Website: www.jenningsmotorgroup.co.uk

Jennings Motor Group was a group of car dealerships in the north east of North East England. It represented several car manufacturers including Ford, Kia, Mazda, Mitsubishi and SEAT, as well as Harley-Davidson. The company was based in Washington, Tyne and Wear, with dealerships in Gateshead, Middlesbrough, South Shields, Sunderland, and Stockton on Tees. It remained a Limited company for over 100 years until it was taken over by Lookers in 2018.

== History ==
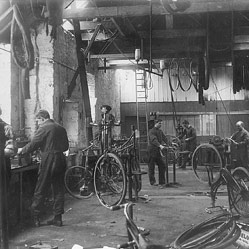
Jennings – Morpeth.

The Jennings Motor Group traces its origin to 1890. It was started by Septimus Jennings in Morpeth, Northumberland.

Septimus Jennings was born on 3 December 1854 in Northumberland. . He married Margaret Short on 19 July 1877 in Morpeth, Northumberland. They had seven children in 12 years. He died on 9 October 1938 in Morpeth, Northumberland, at the age of 83.

In the 1881 Census Septimus Jennings was listed as working as a Steam Plough Man. By 1911 he had decided to change his hobby of repairing bicycles in a garden shed Old Lane, Morpeth into a full-time career, and in the 1911 Census he was listed as a Motor & Cycle Engineer. He purchased his first business premises in Bridge Street, Morpeth, starting with a team of 6 people selling bicycles and later advanced to early motor cars. In 1912 he registered the company at Companies House under the name S Jennings Ltd. By 1917 the Jennings Store in Morpeth had begun selling Motor vehicles. It signed a deal in 1917 with the Ford Motor Company in order to sell Ford cars to the public.

The Jennings Family remained involved in the company until 1992 when Alan Bentley took over as Managing Director.

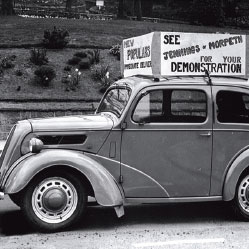
1950 – The new Ford Popular advertised by Jennings Ford in Morpeth, Northumberland.

The Jennings family are still in the car industry and Septimus Jennings' descendant, Russell Jennings, returned to Morpeth in 2010 to open his own private car dealership.

In the 1990s it added showrooms in South Shields and Gateshead. Jennings Ford was also a major dealership in Sunderland, Tyne and Wear after the takeover of Arriva Ford in 2003. 1999 saw the start of building work at Cargo Fleet Lane in Middlesbrough and then in 2003 Jennings Motor Group finally ended the exclusive relationship with Ford and opened the first non-Ford franchise. 2005 saw a change when Nas Khan took over as Managing Director.

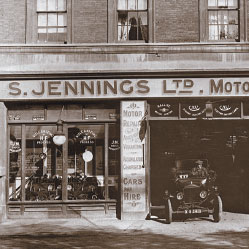
1911 – Jennings first shop in Morpeth, Northumberland.

=== First shop and the Jennings Family ===
In 1908, George Jennings the son of Septimus, had joined the family business officially, and by 1911 both George and William Jennings (1884-1939) were working for their father as Motor Mechanics. In 1912 Septimus Jennings registered S Jennings Ltd with Companies house in the UK and became a Limited Company.

George Jennings eventually went on to head the company before his death in 1958, by which time the Morpeth branch was headed by Gordon Jennings. Gordon started with the company as a clerk in the workshop in 1943, before graduating through all departments of the company. By 1991 Gordon Jennings was listed as the company Chairman with Alan Bentley as the Managing Director, and in 1992 Alan Bentley took over as Chairman following a buyout of the Jennings Family.

=== Relationship with Ford ===
S Jennings Ltd began a partnership with Ford Motor Company in 1917. Mr Jennings was one of the first dealers in the country to be appointed by Ford and Jennings is still has 3 main Ford dealerships. Jennings remained in Morpeth for many years until the sale of the modern Jennings premises in 2007.

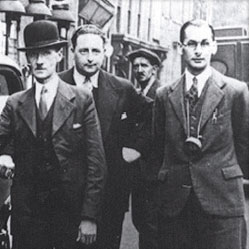
1917 – S Jennings Ltd and Ford Motor Company

In 1919, two years after the company began working with Ford, S Jennings Ltd expanded the range vehicles available and became an appointed dealer for Ford tractors which continued for over 70 years.

=== Later Management Changes and Expansion ===
In 1984, Jennings purchases the Yarm Road dealership in Stockton on Teesside, their first premises outside of Morpeth.

In 1995 Alan Bentley takes over as Managing Director following a buyout from the Jennings family and Jennings purchases the dealership in South Shields. The following year it purchased the Gateshead dealership and in 2015 they added a Transit Centre on the site.

The new dealership on Cargo Fleet Lane in Middlesbrough, Teesside opened in 2000. By 2004 it had added SEAT, Subaru and a Ford commercial site to the Middlesbrough it later expands to include Mazda. and in 2013 it added Mitsubishi. Jennings Mazda opened at the Ford site in Washington in 2003, it was the first non-Ford franchise in the history of the Jennings Motor Group. Jennings Motor Group also acquired Arriva Ford's dealership in Sunderland, Tyne and Wear which later moved to the former Ferguson Transport Depot in 2006 before being sold to Sainsbury's in 2010. 2017 saw Jennings return to Sunderland with two new dealerships, one for Mazda and one Kia next to the Stadium of Light.

In 2005 Nas Khan took over as Managing Director after a Management Buyout and the Jennings Motor Group left Morpeth after more than 100 years after Vertu paid £2.6m to Jennings Group for its Ford dealership in Morpeth.

After changing the Washington site to Kia in 2011, the Jennings Motor Group opened a Kia dealership in Teesside in 2013 which is Britain's biggest Kia dealership.

Leeds Harley-Davidson opened in 2012 on Wellington Road Industrial Estate in Leeds. The opening of Leeds Harley-Davidson dealership was the result of Leeds-based Shahzad Ahmed, and his business partner Sohail Khan – Nas Khan's son. Jennings Motor Group took over the branch in 2015 after a Management buyout. bringing S Jennings Ltd back to its roots in two-wheeled transport. Jennings Harley-Davidson Gateshead opened in 2016.

=== Takeover by Lookers PLC ===
In September 2018 it was announced that S Jennings Ltd in part would be taken over by Lookers PLC. The sites in Sunderland, Middlesbrough, Washington, Gateshead and Stockton moved over to Lookers with the exception of the Leeds Harley-Davidson and Gateshead Harley-Davidson dealerships as well as the Kia dealership in Stockton under the company name SK MotorCycles Ltd.
