= Daniel Avery (music producer) =

English electronic music producer and DJ (born 1986)

- Also known as: Stopmakingme
- Born: 30 September 1986 (age 39); Bournemouth, England
- Years active: 2009–present
- Label: Phantasy Sound

Daniel Avery (born 30 September 1986) is an English electronic music producer and DJ.

== Career ==
=== Early life and musical beginnings ===
Avery was born in Bournemouth, England.

Avery was primarily a fan of guitar music in his youth, performing in local bands inspired by Kyuss and My Bloody Valentine. He became a regular attendee at dance music club night Project Mayhem, before eventually being invited to DJ by the night's promoter.

Avery moved to London in 2007, and first began producing and DJing in 2009 under the name Stopmakingme, collaborating with Little Boots, Hercules and Love Affair, and Metronomy, and regularly performing at Fabric. During this period, Avery worked at the now-defunct Pure Groove record shop in Smithfield Market, London. There he met future collaborators Kelly Lee Owens and James Greenwood. Owens contributed to Avery's debut album, Drone Logic, and Avery produced her first EP, Oleic. In 2011, the shop closed, and he reverted to his birth name for releases from 2012 onward.

=== 2012–present ===
In 2012, Avery contributed a DJ mix to the Fabriclive series, and released the cassette-only mixtape Divided Love. The latter was limited to 100 copies, with one side dedicated to a club mix and the other to more ambient, chill-out tracks.

Avery's debut album, Drone Logic, was released on 4 October 2013. He issued a DJ-Kicks compilation in 2016.

In January 2018, he released the EP Slow Fade, followed by his second album, Song for Alpha, on early champion Erol Alkan's Phantasy Sound and Mute Records months later in April. The album was a marked change to his debut, with critics noting the influence of his collaborations with London producer Volte-Face (as the techno duo Rote) and Alessandro Cortini, with whom he put out a 7″ ambient single in 2017. In 2020 he collaborated with Cortini on the album Illusion of Time. The pair met when Avery supported Nine Inch Nails, for whom Cortini regularly plays, on a US tour in 2018.

In 2019, Avery sat in for Mary Anne Hobbs on her BBC Radio 6 Music programme, 6 Music Recommends. In 2020 he released the single "Lone Swordsman", in tribute to his mentor Andrew Weatherall, who died in February of that year. Proceeds from Bandcamp sales of the single went to Amnesty International. He released his third album, Love + Light, in 2020. The album was a mix of uptempo dance and ambient tracks, returning to a dynamic first explored in his earlier Divided Love mix.

His fourth album, Together in Static, was released on 24 June 2021. Avery released his fifth album, Ultra Truth, in November 2022. The record features vocals by Kelly Lee Owens, HTRK's Jonnie Standish, HAAi, Marie Davidson, and SHERELLE. It was preceded by the single "Chaos Energy".

In February 2025, a 4-track EP was announced by Demise of Love, a group made up of Avery, Ghost Culture and Working Men's Club. A single, Strange Little Consequence, was released as part of this announcement with the EP releasing on 30 May.

== Discography ==
=== Albums ===
- Drone Logic (Phantasy Sound, 2013)
- Song for Alpha (Phantasy/Mute, 2018)
- Illusion of Time (with Alessandro Cortini) (Rough Trade, 2020)
- Love + Light (Phantasy Sound, 2020)
- Together in Static (Phantasy Sound, 2021)
- Ultra Truth (Phantasy Sound, 2022)
- Tremor (Domino, 2025)
- Tremor (Midnight Versions) (Domino, 2025)

=== Extended plays ===
- Airstrike E.P. (Relish Recordings, 2012)
- Movement EP (Throne Of Blood, 2012)
- Water Jump (Phantasy Sound, 2013)
- Drone Logic (Phantasy Sound, 2014)
- Projector EP (Phantasy Sound, 2018)
- Slow Fade EP (Phantasy Sound, 2018)
- Diminuendo EP (Phantasy Sound, 2018)
- More Truth (Phantasy Sound, 2023)
- Drone Logic (2023 Redux Versions) (Phantasy Sound, 2014)
- Demise of Love (with Ghost Culture and Working Men's Club) (Domino, 2025)

=== Compilations ===
- New Energy (Collected Remixes) (Because Music, 2015)
- Song for Alpha (B-Sides & Remixes) (Phantasy Sound, 2019)

=== DJ mixes ===
- FabricLive.66 (Fabric, 2013)
- DJ Kicks: Daniel Avery (!K7, 2016)
