= Heather Hancock =

Master of St John's College, Cambridge (born 1965)

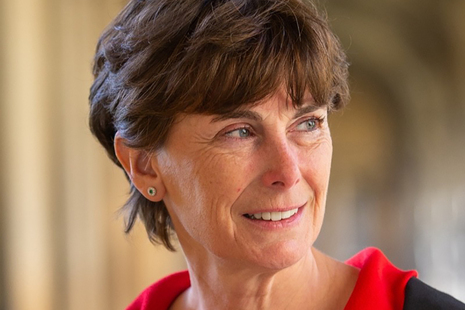

Master of St John's College, Cambridge
- Incumbent
- Assumed office October 2020
- Preceded by: Chris Dobson

Personal details
- Born: Heather Jane Wilkinson; 27 August 1965 (age 61) Colne, Lancashire, England
- Spouse: Mark Hancock
- Education: Nelson and Colne College; St John's College, Cambridge

Heather Jane Hancock LVO DL (born 27 August 1965) is a former civil servant who has held numerous positions related to North Yorkshire. Since 1 October 2020, she has been Master of St John's College, Cambridge.

== Early life and education ==
Hancock was born Heather Jane Wilkinson on 27 August 1965 in Colne, Lancashire, England. She was educated at Park High School, Colne, and Nelson and Colne College. She studied land economy at St John's College, Cambridge, gaining a first-class degree. She was made an honorary fellow of the college in February 2019. In 2021, she was made an honorary fellow of Trinity College Dublin and of Darwin College, Cambridge.

== Career ==
Hancock joined the Government Economic Service in 1988, and served as Private Secretary to three Home Secretaries: David Waddington, Kenneth Baker, and Kenneth Clarke. She was part of the team which created the new Department of National Heritage (now the Department for Digital, Culture, Media and Sport), established after the 1992 General Election, where she was Private Secretary to the Permanent Secretary, Hayden Phillips. She established the Millennium Commission in 1994, and served as its Acting Chief Executive and Deputy Chief Executive. She was chairman of the English Football League's working party on the structure of football from 1997 to 1998.

Hancock was the first female chief executive of the Yorkshire Dales National Park, from 1998 until 2000. She then became executive director for the environment and development at Yorkshire Forward. She was a founder trustee of the Yorkshire Dales Millennium Trust from 1996 to 2003.

From 2000 to 2012, she was a trustee of The Prince's Trust and chaired the charity's audit committee. Hancock chaired the BBC's Rural Affairs Advisory Committee from 2003 to 2010, and subsequently was invited by the BBC Trust to report on bias and impartiality in its coverage of rural affairs.

She became a governor of Giggleswick School in North Yorkshire in 2007, and was chairman from 2013 to 2019.

She was a Managing Partner of Deloitte in the United Kingdom and Switzerland between 2008 and 2014, with executive responsibility for Innovation, Brand, Communications and Talent, and a Partner in the firm's Strategy Consulting business from 2003 to 2014. She led the firm's global services to the 2012 Summer Olympics, and the global Olympic movement. Hancock was a member of Deloitte's global leadership team from 2011 to 2013 as Global MD for Brand and Communications.

Hancock was a Trustee of the International Business Leaders Forum from 2011 to 2014. She was deputy chair of the World Athletics Championships and World Para Athletics Championships from 2013 to 2016. She was a member of North Yorkshire County Council's North Yorkshire Rural Commission to inquire into the sustainability of remote rural communities from 2019 to 2020.

Hancock is an independent non-executive director of Urban Logistics REIT plc. Hancock became a trustee of The Prince's Countryside Fund in July 2021. She is a Trustee of the Chatsworth Settlement Trust. From January 2019 to September 2020, she was chairman of Holker Group, owner of Holker Hall.

=== Food Standards Agency ===
In April 2016, Hancock was appointed Chair of the Food Standards Agency (FSA), having been appointed deputy chair in September 2015 while awaiting a Parliamentary Select Committee pre-appointment hearing before the appointment as chair was confirmed. In February 2019, she was reappointed for an additional three-year term. In May 2019, Hancock testified before the Environment, Food and Rural Affairs Select Committee about the FSA's preparations for Brexit. She gave evidence on food safety after Brexit to the House of Lords EU Energy and Environment Sub-Committee in March 2019 and in July 2018. Hancock's term at the FSA ended on 31 January 2021.

=== Master of St John's College, Cambridge ===
In November 2019, it was announced that Hancock had been elected the 45th Master of St John's College, Cambridge, the first woman to be elected to the role. It was announced that Hancock would leave her post at the Food Standards Agency after taking office as Master. She took up her appointment as Master of St John's College on 1 October 2020.

On her appointment as Master of St John's College, Hancock spoke of her wish to continue "championing [St John's College's] pioneering work on access – such as the St John's Studentships offered to students from lower- and middle-income households". Shortly prior to taking up the role of Master of St John's College, Hancock resigned her role as Chair of the Governing Body of the independent Giggleswick School which her children had attended.

=== Lead non-executive board member to Defra ===
On 21 July 2023, the Department for Environment, Food and Rural Affairs (Defra) announced the appointment of Hancock as the lead non-executive board member of the departmental Board, which provides strategic, corporate leadership to the department and has particular responsibility for monitoring performance and delivery.

== Personal life ==
Hancock was appointed a Lieutenant of the Royal Victorian Order in the 2013 New Year Honours, in recognition of her work with The Prince's Trust. Before becoming Master of St John's, Hancock lived in North Yorkshire, where she was a Deputy Lieutenant. She is married to Mark Hancock, who is chairman of Rural Solutions, a planning consultancy, and director of Talisman Capital, a property company. Heather Hancock is a non-executive director of Rural Solutions. Together they own a pub, a restaurant, and Threshfield Moor, a 1,500-acre grouse moor in the Yorkshire Dales, for which they receive stewardship payments. Hancock is a director of Amerdale Ltd, their family company.

Academic offices
| Preceded by Chris Dobson | Master of St John's College, Cambridge; 2020 - | Succeeded by Incumbent |
