= Tremor (Daniel Avery album) =

Studio album by Daniel Avery
- Released: 31 October 2025
- Length: 49:11
- Label: Domino

Daniel Avery chronology
Ultra Truth (2022)	Tremor (2025)

Singles from Tremor
- 1. "Rapture in Blue" Released: 23 July 2025

Tremor is the sixth studio album by English electronic musician Daniel Avery. It was released on 31 October 2025, by Domino Recording Company.

== Background ==
On 23 July 2025, Daniel Avery announced the release of his new studio album Tremor, alongside the single Rapture in Blue. The single features Canadian musician Cecile Believe.

== Critical reception ==
Professional ratings
Aggregate scores
Source	Rating
AnyDecentMusic?	(7.5/10)
Metacritic	81/100
Review scores
Source	Rating
AllMusic	4/5 stars
Clash	(7/10)
DIY	4.5/5 stars
God Is in the TV	(8/10)
Hot Press	(8/10)
Pitchfork	(6.9/10)
PopMatters	(8/10)

Tremor was met with "universal acclaim" reviews from critics. At Metacritic, which assigns a weighted average rating out of 100 to reviews from mainstream publications, this release received an average score of 81, based on 6 reviews.

=== Accolades ===
Publications' year-end list appearances for Tremor
Critic/Publication	List	Rank	Ref
PopMatters	Best Electronic Albums of 2025	8	

== Track listing ==
All music is composed by Daniel Avery, unless noted.

Tremor track listing
No.	Title	Music	Length
1.	"Neon Pulse"	Daniel Avery; James Greenwood	2:19
2.	"Rapture in Blue"	Avery; Andy Bell; Manni Dee; Caila Thompson-Hannant	4:13
3.	"Haze"	Avery; Greenwood; Ellie Rowsell	3:56
4.	"Silent Shadow" (featuring Bdrmm)	Avery; Greenwood	5:06
5.	"New Life"	Avery; Manni Dee; Asha Catherine Nandy	4:16
6.	"Greasy off the Racing Line"	Avery; Greenwood; Alison Mosshart	4:09
7.	"Until the Moon Starts Shaking"	Avery; Dee	2:16
8.	"The Ghost of Her Smile"	Avery; Greenwood; Julie Dawson	3:40
9.	"Disturb Me"	Avery; Dee; Nat Ćmiel	3:07
10.	"In Keeping (Soon We'll Be Dust)"	Avery; Greenwood; Walter Schreifels	3:43
11.	"Tremor"	Avery; Greenwood	3:57
12.	"A Memory Wrapped in Paper and Smoke"	Avery; Greenwood	3:11
13.	"I Feel You"	Avery; Greenwood; Polly Mackey	5:18
Total length:			49:11

== Charts ==
Chart performance for Tremor
Chart (2025)	Peak position
Scottish Albums (Official Charts)	30
UK Album Downloads (Official Charts)	11
UK Dance Albums (Official Charts)	5
UK Independent Albums (Official Charts)	7
