= Polyawkward =

EP by English Teacher
- Released: 22 April 2022
- Genre: Art punk
- Length: 16:24
- Label: Nice Swan
- Producer: Theo Verney

English Teacher chronology
Polyawkward (2022)	This Could Be Texas (2024)

Polyawkward is the debut EP by the English group English Teacher, released on 22 April 2022 through Nice Swan Recordings. It received positive reviews from critics.

== Critical reception ==
Professional ratings
Review scores
Source	Rating
Beats Per Minute	76%
DIY	4/5 stars
The Line of Best Fit	8/10
NME	4/5 stars

Ims Taylor of DIY called it "ethereal, exploratory, and unexpected", calling it "a bitesize promise of exciting things to come". Taylor also found that "moody guitar meanderings and offbeat vocal musings are English Teacher's weapons of choice". The Line of Best Fit's Kieran Macadie summarised it as "a solid body of work from a fresh young band that intend to make their mark on music – filled with absurdist humour, orbiting guitar riffs and punchy melody".

Reviewing the EP for NME, Sophie Williams called the five tracks "punchy, melodic songs [that] unite nervy, whirlpooling guitars with cutting takedowns of the day-to-day (laborious supermarket trips, hangovers, dodgy dates). It makes for a deliciously sour debut EP, set to a soundtrack of restless art-punk". Eddie Smith of Beats Per Minute wrote that the band's "haunting arpeggios lurch into a capricious mix of poetry, bass riffs and guitar stabs, making for an exhilarating 16 minutes" with "math rock volatility" and "overt indie pop moments present".

== Track listing ==
Polyawkward track listing
No.	Title	Length
1.	"Polyawkward"	4:04
2.	"A55"	4:09
3.	"Mental Maths"	3:08
4.	"Yorkshire Tapas"	2:21
5.	"Good Grief"	2:42
Total length:		16:24
