= Lily Fontaine =

British musician (born 1997)

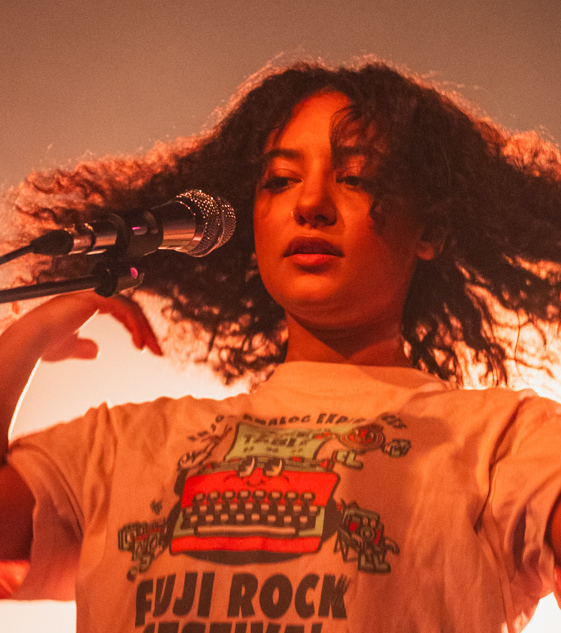
- Fontaine in 2026

Background information
- Born: 17 October 1997 (age 28); Huddersfield, West Yorkshire, England
- Origin: Colne, Lancashire, England
- Genres: Indie rock; art rock; post-punk
- Occupations: Musician; singer; journalist
- Instruments: Vocals; rhythm guitar; piano; synthesiser; percussion
- Years active: 2016–present
- Member of: English Teacher
- Formerly of: Eades

Lily Fontaine (born 17 October 1997) is a British musician and the frontwoman of the indie rock band English Teacher. She was also previously a member of the band Eades.

== Early life ==
Fontaine was born to a Dominican father and an English mother in Huddersfield, Yorkshire and grew up in Colne, Lancashire. She attended Park High School and completed her A Levels at Burnley College. As a teenager, she was a member of a wedding band with a friend. Fontaine graduated from the Leeds College of Music.

== Career ==
Fontaine first came up with the concept for a band in 2016 and met the members of what would become English Teacher in 2018 while studying at the Leeds College of Music, initially forming the band Frank. Frank released their debut EP Valentine in 2019. By 2020, Frank had rebranded to English Teacher. The band would go on to receive critical acclaim and the Mercury Prize debut album This Could Be Texas (2024).

In addition, Fontaine was recruited to join the indie rock and post punk band Eades by Harry Jordan and Tom O'Reilly, whom she also met through the Leeds College of Music. She primarily contributed vocals, synths and percussion to the group, as well as keyboard and rhythm guitar. The group signed with Heist or Hit Records. She departed Eades in 2022.

As a journalist, Fontaine had a column in Come Play With Me magazine. She also contributed to Northern Life Magazine and DIY. She was offered a job as an editor, but declined to focus on English Teacher.

In 2025, Fontaine was appointed a Fellow of Leeds Conservatoire (her re-named alma mater).

== Artistry ==
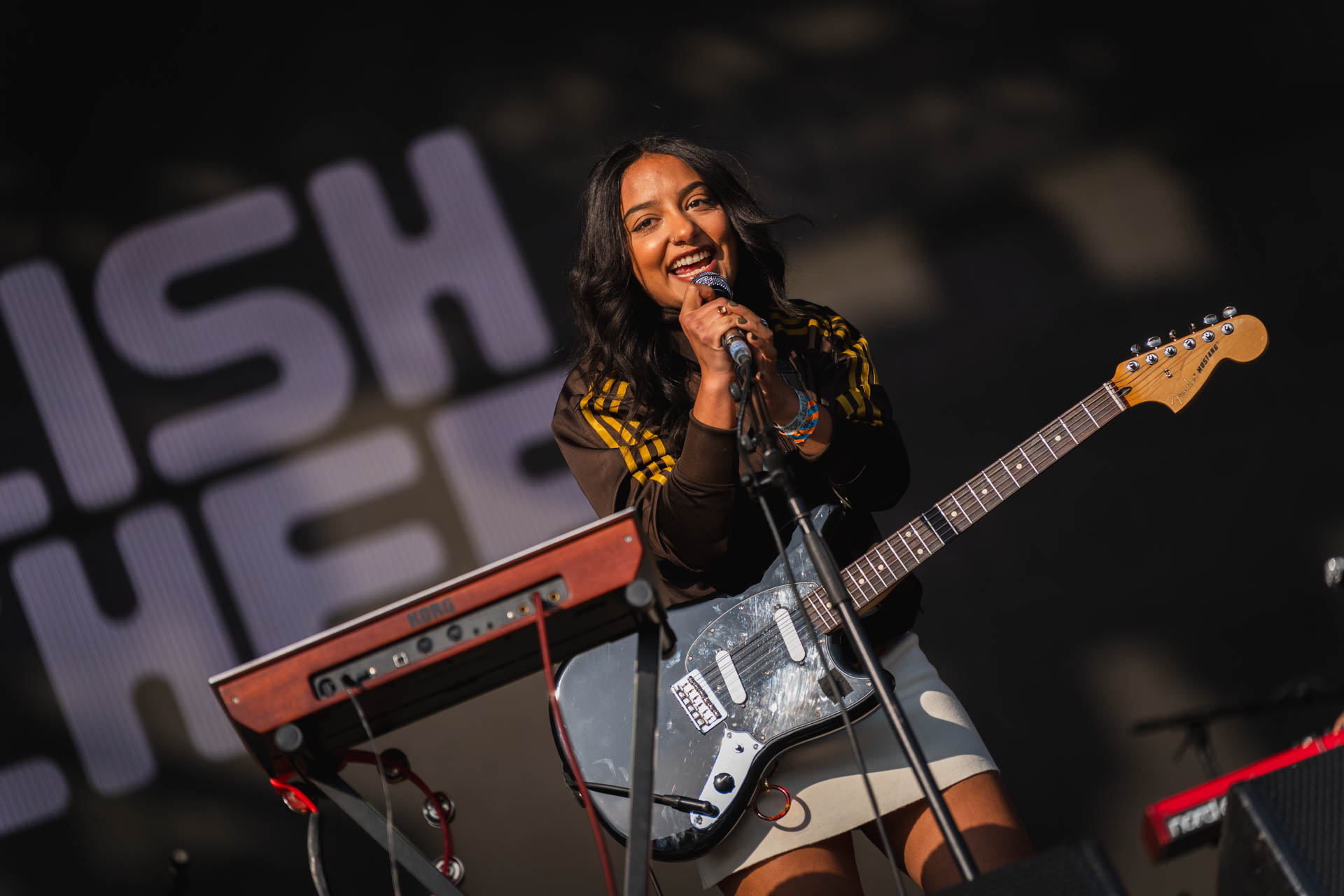
Fontaine performing at Wide Awake 2025

Fontaine is the primary lyricist of English Teacher and one of its primary songwriters. Caradoc Gayer of LeftLion praised Fontaine's lyricism, which "read like poems filled with motion – dynamic, topical, and grounded in the cultural memory of Yorkshire. It's top-grade song writing", while Tom Pinnock of Uncut called her lyrics "deep and funny". When the Horn Blows described Fontaine's writing as "wry observations on modern life", with the band's lyrics touching on topics such as racism, identity, class and mental health.

Regarding influences, Fontaine called herself "a big fan of Alex Turner's lyricism; Arctic Monkeys were one of the first bands that I really got into… after The Beatles". Amy Winehouse was one of her "biggest influences". Winehouse, The Smiths and Joy Division inspired Fontaine to pursue music. She also named the poets John Cooper Clarke, Benjamin Zephaniah and Carol Ann Duffy as writing influences. In addition, Fontaine is an admirer of Poly Styrene of X-Ray Spex.

English Teacher's 2021 single "R&B" drew upon Black Midi and Black Country, New Road, although Fontaine said they "didn't want to be pigeonholed" into that.
