= Song for Alpha =

Studio album by Daniel Avery
- Released: 6 April 2018
- Label: Mute/Phantasy Sound

Daniel Avery chronology
Drone Logic (2013)	Song for Alpha (2018)	Illusion of Time (2020)

Singles from Song for Alpha
- 1. "Sensation/Clear" Released: 4 December 2015; 2. "Diminuendo" Released: 12 October 2018

Professional ratings
Aggregate scores
Source	Rating
AnyDecentMusic?	8/10
Metacritic	84/100
Review scores
Source	Rating
AllMusic	4/5 stars
Clash	8/10
DIY	4/5 stars
Drowned in Sound	8/10
Exclaim!	8/10
The Guardian	4/5 stars
The Line of Best Fit	8/10
MusicOMH	3.5/5 stars
Resident Advisor	4/5 stars
Under the Radar	7/10

Song for Alpha is the second studio album by English electronic musician Daniel Avery. It was released on 6 April 2018 under Mute Records in the United States and Canada, and Phantasy Sound for worldwide.

== Accolades ==
Accolades for Songs for Alpha
Publication	Accolade	Rank	Ref.
The A.V. Club	Top 20 Albums of 2018	17	
DJ Mag	Top 50 Albums of 2018	15	
Fopp	Top 100 Albums of 2018	20	
The Guardian	Best Albums of 2018 - Mid-year	N/A	
Mixmag	Top 50 Albums of 2018	7	
PopMatters	Top 25 Electronic Albums of 2018	24	
Rough Trade	Top 100 Albums of 2018	33	

== Critical reception ==
Song for Alpha was met with universal acclaim reviews from critics. At Metacritic, which assigns a weighted average rating out of 100 to reviews from mainstream publications, this release received an average score of 84, based on 17 reviews.

== Track listing ==
Songs for Alpha track listing
No.	Title	Length
1.	"First Light"	1:38
2.	"Stereo L"	5:39
3.	"Projector"	5:14
4.	"TBW17"	1:09
5.	"Sensation"	7:33
6.	"Citizen // Nowhere"	3:37
7.	"Clear"	5:33
8.	"Diminuendo"	7:00
9.	"Days From Now"	2:45
10.	"Embers"	1:55
11.	"Slow Fade"	5:32
12.	"Glitter"	6:42
13.	"Endnote"	0:08
14.	"Quick Eternity"	8:35

== Charts ==
Chart performance for Song for Alpha
Chart (2020)	Peak position
Belgian Albums (Ultratop Flanders)	188
Scottish Albums (Official Charts)	34
UK Albums (Official Charts)	80
UK Dance Albums (Official Charts)	4
UK Independent Albums (Official Charts)	15
