= Ultra Truth =

Studio album by Daniel Avery
- Released: 4 November 2022
- Length: 57:27
- Label: Phantasy Sound
- Producers: Daniel Avery; James Greenwood

Professional ratings
Aggregate scores
Source	Rating
AnyDecentMusic?	7.7/10
Metacritic	85/100
Review scores
Source	Rating
AllMusic	4/5 stars
The Daily Telegraph	5/5 stars
DIY	4.5/5 stars
Financial Times	4/5 stars
The Guardian	4/5 stars
MusicOMH	4/5 stars
PopMatters	9/10
The Skinny	3/5 stars
Slant	4.5/5 stars
Uncut	8/10

Ultra Truth is an album by English musician Daniel Avery. It was released on 4 November 2022 through Phantasy Sound. It features guest appearances from HAAi, Jonnine, James Massiah, Kelly Lee Owens, A. K. Paul and Sherelle.

== Track listing ==
All tracks are produced by Daniel Avery except where noted.

Ultra Truth track listing
No.	Title	Writer(s)	Producer(s)	Length
1.	"New Faith"	Daniel Avery; Manni Dee; Sophie Hutchings		3:44
2.	"Ultra Truth"	Avery; James Greenwood; Marie Davidson	Avery; Greenwood	5:17
3.	"Wall of Sleep" (with HAAi)	Avery; HAAi; Dee	Avery; Greenwood	4:47
4.	"The Slow Bullet"	Avery; Dee; Matty Healy		1:18
5.	"Devotion"	Avery; Dee		3:51
6.	"Only" (with Jonnine)	Avery; Jonnine Standish; Dee		2:36
7.	"Spider"	Avery; Greenwood	Avery; Greenwood	5:05
8.	"Near Perfect" (with Sherelle)	Avery; Dee; Sherelle		2:30
9.	"Higher"	Avery; Dee		5:02
10.	"Ache" (with A. K. Paul)	Avery; Dee; A. K. Paul		1:22
11.	"Collapsing Sky"	Avery; Greenwood	Avery; Greenwood	4:52
12.	"Lone Swordsman"	Avery; Greenwood; Dee	Avery; Greenwood	4:23
13.	"Overflowing with Escape"	Avery; Dee		2:11
14.	"Chaos Energy" (with Kelly Lee Owens and HAAi)	Avery; HAAi; Greenwood; Kelly Lee Owens	Avery; Greenwood	5:13
15.	"Heavy Rain" (with James Massiah)	Avery; Greenwood; James Massiah	Avery; Greenwood	5:09
Total length:				57:27

== Charts ==
Chart performance for Ultra Truth
Chart (2022)	Peak position
Scottish Albums (Official Charts)	36
UK Albums (Official Charts)	61
UK Dance Albums (Official Charts)	1
UK Independent Albums (Official Charts)	8
