= LondonMetric Property =

British property company

LondonMetric Property plc
- Company type: Public
- Traded as: LSE: LMP; FTSE 100 component
- Industry: Property
- Founded: 2007
- Headquarters: London, England, UK
- Key people: Alistair Elliott, Chairman; Andrew Jones, CEO
- Revenue: ▲£464.6 million (2026)
- Operating income: ▼£452.4 million (2026)
- Net income: ▼£295.4 million (2026)
- Website: londonmetric.com

LondonMetric Property plc is a British property company based in London, England. It is listed on the London Stock Exchange and is a constituent of the FTSE 100 Index.

== History ==
The company was established by Raymond Mould and Patrick Vaughan in October 2007 as London & Stamford Property plc and admitted to the Alternative Investment Market in November 2007.

It acquired a significant stake in the Meadowhall Shopping Centre from British Land in February 2009. It was first listed on the London Stock Exchange and became a REIT in October 2010.

In January 2013, the company merged with Metric Property Investments to form LondonMetric Property.

In January 2024, it was confirmed that the company would acquire LXi REIT in a deal worth £1.9 billion (US$2.43 billion), and, in April 2025, it was confirmed that the company would buy Urban Logistics REIT in a deal worth £674 million.

In January 2026, it was announced LondonMetric Property had acquired nine purpose-built Premier Inn hotels from Whitbread for £89 million. The properties were acquired through a sale and leaseback arrangement and let to Whitbread on new 30-year leases, increasing LondonMetric’s Premier Inn portfolio to 22 hotels.

== Operations ==
The company has about 572 property investments, all located in the UK. The company's investment properties were valued at £7.8 billion as of 31 March 2026.
