= Drone Logic =

Studio album by Daniel Avery
- Released: 7 October 2013
- Length: 68:47
- Label: Phantasy Sound

Daniel Avery chronology
Drone Logic (2013)	Song for Alpha (2018)

Professional ratings
Aggregate scores
Source	Rating
Metacritic	83/100
Review scores
Source	Rating
AllMusic	4.5/5 stars
Clash	7/10
The Irish Times	4/5 stars
Mixmag	5/5 stars
Mojo	4/5 stars
NME	4/5 stars
Pitchfork	7.2/10
Q	4/5 stars
Resident Advisor	4/5 stars
The Skinny	5/5 stars

Drone Logic is the debut studio album by English electronic musician Daniel Avery. It was released on 7 October 2013 under Phantasy Sound and Because Music.

== Accolades ==
Accolades for Drone Logic
Publication	Accolade	Rank	Ref.
Clash	Top 40 Albums of 2013	38	
Crack Magazine	Top 100 Albums of 2013	9	
The Quietus	Top 100 Albums of 2013	7	
Resident Advisor	Top 20 Albums of 2013	20	

== Critical reception ==
Drone Logic was met with universal acclaim from critics. At Metacritic, which assigns a weighted average rating out of 100 to reviews from mainstream publications, this release received an average score of 83, based on 11 reviews.

== Track listing ==
Drone Logic track listing
No.	Title	Length
1.	"Water Jump"	8:29
2.	"Free Floating"	6:29
3.	"Drone Logic"	7:09
4.	"These Nights Never End"	5:46
5.	"Naive Response"	5:23
6.	"Platform Zero"	3:03
7.	"Need Electric"	6:09
8.	"All I Need"	6:55
9.	"Spring 27"	1:41
10.	"Simulrec"	6:02
11.	"New Energy (Live Through It)"	5:54
12.	"Knowing We'll Be Here"	5:42

== Charts ==
Chart performance for Drone Logic
Chart (2013)	Peak position
UK Dance Albums (Official Charts)	20
UK Independent Albums (Official Charts)	23
