= Rosemary Lain-Priestley =

The Venerable Rosemary Lain-Priestley
- Archdeacon for the Two Cities (Archdeacon of Charing Cross)
- Diocese: Diocese of London
- In office: 1 January 2016 – 31 December 2018 (res.)
- Other post: Adviser to the Bishop of London (2019–present)

Orders
- Ordination: 1996 (deacon); 1997(priest)

Personal details
- Born: 1967 (age 58–59)
- Education: Park High School; Nelson and Colne College
- Alma mater: University of Kent

Rosemary Jane Lain-Priestley (born 1967) is a Church of England priest and former Archdeacon for the Two Cities.

== Early life and education ==
She was born in 1967 in Lancashire, England. She was educated at the University of Kent and worked as an immigration adviser until joining the Carlisle Diocese Training Course. She holds an MA from King's College London.

== Ordained ministry ==
She was ordained deacon in 1996 and priest in 1997. After curacies at St Paul, Scotforth and St Martin-in-the-Fields she was the Dean of Women's Ministry in the Two Cities Area from 2006 to 2015. In 2016 she became the Associate Archdeacon of London, working with Luke Miller, the Archdeacon of London. She was collated to the Archdeaconry of Charing Cross, but her title was later revised to "Archdeacon for the Two Cities". She resigned her archdeaconry on 31 December 2018, to become an Adviser to the Bishop of London.

== Personal life ==
She is married and has three children, two daughters and one son.
