= LXi REIT =

British real estate investment trust

- Company type: Public
- Traded as: Formerly LSE: LXI
- Industry: Property
- Founded: 2016; 10 years ago
- Headquarters: London, UK
- Key people: Cyrus Ardalan, Chairman
- Revenue: ▲£203.5 million (2023)
- Operating income: ▼£(207.9) million (2023)
- Net income: ▼£(288.1) million (2023)
- Parent: LondonMetric Property
- Website: www.lxireit.com

LXi REIT is a British real estate investment trust based in London. It was listed on the London Stock Exchange until it was acquired by LondonMetric Property in March 2024.

== History ==
The company was established by Osprey Equity Partners with support from Ram Bhavnani, a wealthy Spanish investor, in 2016. Bhavnani's previous ventures included a significant investment in Bankinter, a Spanish-based bank. LXi REIT was the subject of an initial public offering in 2018.

In January 2024, it was confirmed that LondonMetric Property would acquire LXi REIT in a deal worth £1.9 billion (US$2.43 billion). The transaction received court approval on 4 March 2024.

== Operations ==
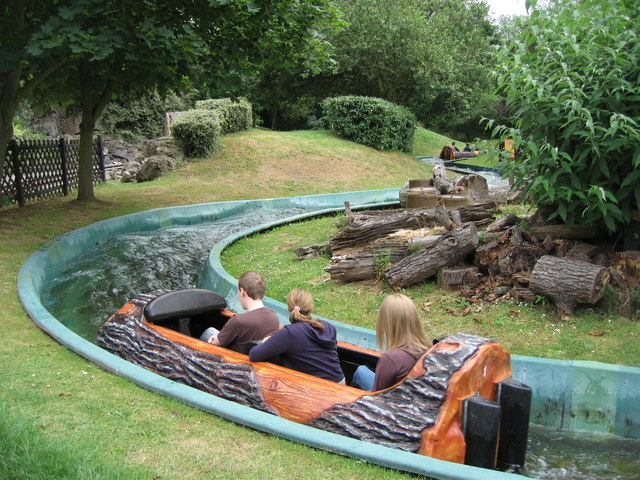
Thorpe Park theme park is one of LXI's assets.

The company has a portfolio of commercial properties rented out to corporate customers on 20 to 30-year inflation-linked leases. The net book value of the portfolio was £3.6 billion as at 31 March 2023. Its assets include interests in the Thorpe Park and Alton Towers theme parks.
