= Lookers =

British car dealership

- Type: Privately owned company
- Industry: Car sales
- Founded: 1908
- Headquarters: Altrincham, UK
- Key people: Alex Smith (Chair); Owen McLellan (CFO); Tiku Patel (Non Executive Director)
- Products: New and used cars and vans
- Revenue: ▲£4,300.9 million (2022)
- Operating income: ▼£108.9 million (2022)
- Net income: ▲£73.9 million (2022)
- Number of employees: 6,500
- Website: www.lookers.co.uk

Lookers is a British car dealership chain in the United Kingdom and Ireland. It represents multiple brands, and is based in Altrincham. It was listed on the London Stock Exchange until it was bought by Global Auto Holdings, a sister company of Alpha Auto Group, for £465.4m in 2023.

== History ==
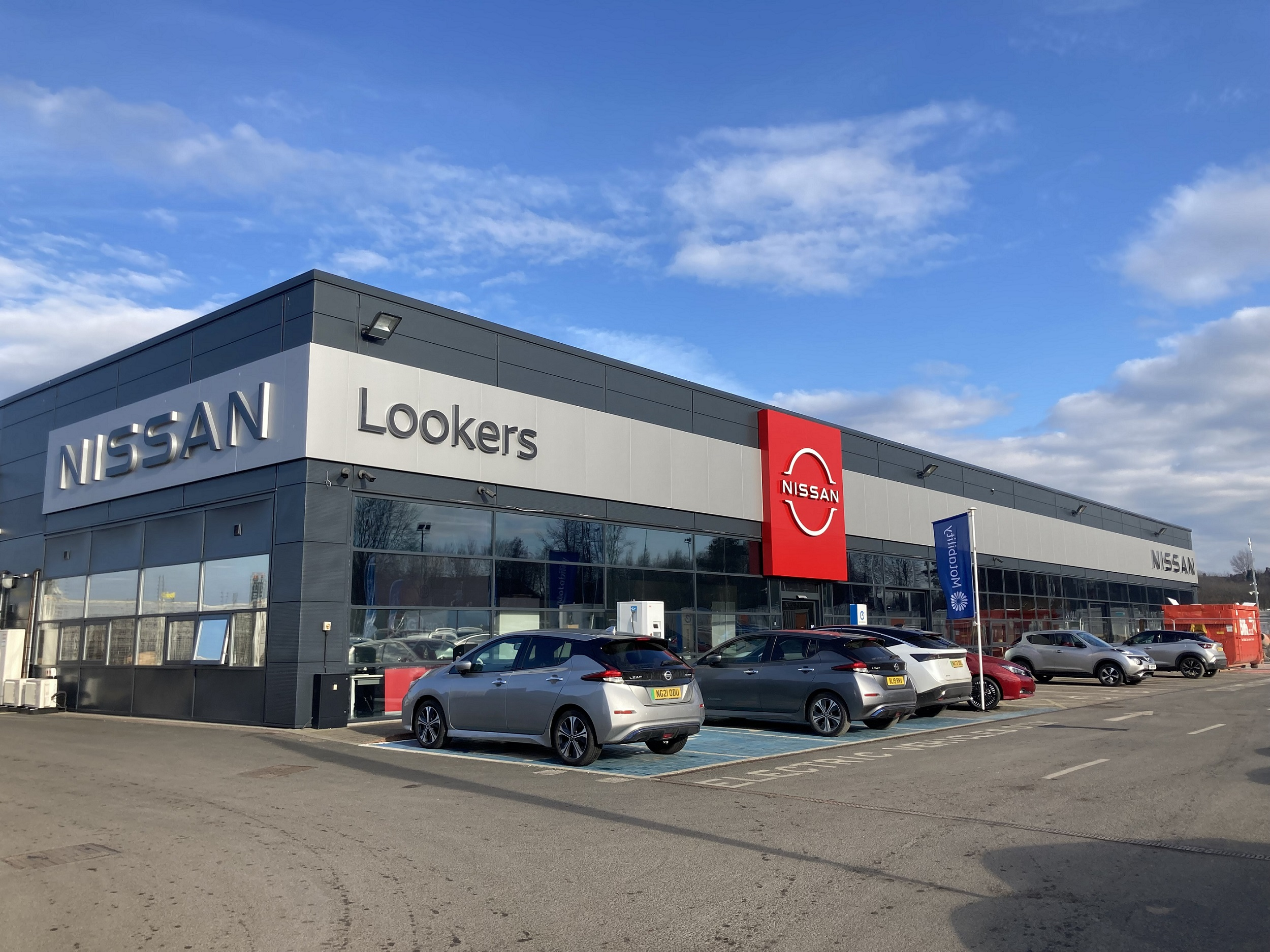
Lookers Nissan Gateshead, 2023

The Lookers Group was established in 1908, by John Looker. It was based in Manchester, and dealt with the sale of bicycles, parts, accessories. In 1910, the business joined forces, to create Lookers Ltd. Until World War I, Lookers Ltd was primarily a Ford dealer, which thrived to such an extent that, in 1911, the garage in Hardman Street had to be completely rebuilt, to accommodate the business generated by Ford.

In 1918, the business was appointed a distributor of Austin Motor Company. It continued to grow throughout Lancashire and Cheshire, through the acquisition of a number of garages. Lookers and Austin became very closely associated such that the slogan "Lookers is Austin" lasted for many years. The business continued to prosper until World War II, in 1939.

In 1973, the group's headquarters were transferred to Chester Road in Timperley and the company became a listed company on the London Stock Exchange. Issuing shares on the stock exchange created extra funds, which then enabled the company to take its first major steps towards expansion.

Lookers strengthened its Vauxhall dealerships, with the acquisition of Braid Group, a major dealership group based in Liverpool, for £3 million. The purchase was completed in 1983. By December 1984, the first full year including Braid, the company's sales topped £150 million.

In 1989, Lookers acquired SMAC Continental, based in South East England, for £14.7 million. That purchase also added SMAC's dealerships of Mercedes-Benz to Lookers portfolio of manufacturers. In February 1996, Lookers bought Charles Hurst Group, a dealership in Northern Ireland.

Meanwhile, Lookers began an investment program, which included the opening of a £4.5 million dealership in Stretford in 1999, for sales of Suzuki, SEAT and Mazda. Investments totalling £20 million, in order to open new showrooms in Chester, Liverpool, and Oldham in 2001. The company added a number of existing dealerships as well, such as 452 Birmingham and Spekehall Vauxhall, bought from Vauxhall and Rystar Aston and Selly Oak Vauxhall, bought from Ryland Group.

In August 2002, Lookers further strengthened its Vauxhall network, with the purchase of Elt Brothers, based in Birmingham, for £900,000.

In May 2002, Lookers teamed up with Morrisons, in an experiment to sell cars from Internet displays in three supermarkets of Morrisons. By 2003, Lookers' network of dealerships had topped 90. The company had built up an extensive network, throughout the United Kingdom. In February 2003, Lookers completed its United Kingdom presence, with a move into Scotland. Through Hurst, it acquired JN Holdings, better known as the operator of Taggarts Motor Group in Glasgow and Motherwell.

In August 2004, Lookers made another significant acquisition, this time boosting its presence in the United Kingdom aftermarket car parts circuit, when it bought FPS Distribution.

Other dealerships acquired through December 2004 included Savoy Honda in Warrington; Vauxhall dealerships in Lisburn and Portadown; Darlington Volkswagen; another Volkswagen dealership in Northallerton; and one dealership of Saab in Chester. In February 2005, Lookers added a used car "supermarket" Bristol Trade Center, paying £8.5 million.

In December 2005, Lookers made a bid for larger rival Reg Vardy. However, Pendragon PLC offered a counter bid, which succeeded after Lookers decided it could not raise its bid. During the bidding battle for Reg Vardy, Pendragon made an unsuccessful hostile bid for Lookers. In October 2007, Lookers acquired Dutton Forshaw, another dealership, from Lloyds TSB for £60 million.

The company went on to buy Lomond Audi Group in July 2012, Shields Motors, and opened Volkswagen Van Centre Glasgow in May 2013, and Colborne Group in March 2014.

On 3 September 2015, Lookers acquired Tyneside based Benfield Motor Group for £87.5 million and expanded to become the third biggest car dealership in the country. The deal saw Lookers plc expand further into the North East and Cumbria. Benfield brands include Nissan, Renault, Volkswagen, Škoda, Kia, Honda, Hyundai, Lexus, Toyota and Ford. The company headquarters moved to Altrincham in July 2017. In 2018, Lookers acquired Stockton-based Jennings Motor Group.

Lookers appointed Mark Rabban as CEO in February 2020. Following the outbreak of Covid-19, in March 2020, Lookers temporarily closed all its dealerships with immediate effect in order to minimise the impact of the virus to both its customers and staff members in line with government guidance. The beginning of 2022 saw Constellation – Europe’s biggest car seller – acquire a 20% stake in Lookers, totalling 78m shares. In March 2022 Lookers Plc sold its London Battersea site for £28m in a sale and leaseback deal with property group Urban Logistics REIT.

In April 2022, Lookers transformed its Manchester Headquarters into a collaboration hub for its hybrid teams to meet.

In June 2023, Global Auto Holdings, a sister company of Alpha Auto Group, which is an Ontario-based car dealership chain, made an agreed offer to acquire the company at a price which valued it at £465.4m.

== Operations ==
Lookers plc operates a national network of car dealerships, featuring a wide range of car manufacturers, including the volume brands Vauxhall and Renault. The company also has dealerships for a number of high end manufacturers, including Ferrari in Northern Ireland, and Jaguar in Northern Ireland and Scotland. The company also sells agricultural vehicles, equipment and machinery, and operates the United Kingdom's leading wholesale auto parts distributor, FPS Distribution.

== Investigation ==
In June 2019, the company announced it would be investigated by the Financial Conduct Authority (FCA) over its sales processes from 2016 to 2019. In December 2018, the company completed an independent review that found control issues with the group's sale processes. The review was shared with the FCA. Just over a week later, chief financial officer Robin Gregson left and was succeeded by Mark Raban. In November 2019, chief executive Andy Bruce and chief operating officer Nigel McMinn resigned.

In March 2020 the company delayed the announcement of its results after the discovery of "potentially fraudulent transactions". In June 2020, Lookers announced that it will cut out 1,200 jobs and sell or reorganize 12 sites in order to save around £50 million. The company discovered fraudulent transactions, misstatement in debtor balances and false expenses claims at one of its divisions. The investigation was extended across all its operating divisions.

In March 2021, the FCA investigation into Lookers was closed, with the FCA concluding that it would not be fining the company for any breaches. However, the investigation highlighted concerns relating to "the historic culture, systems and controls" at Lookers.
