= English Teacher =

British musical group

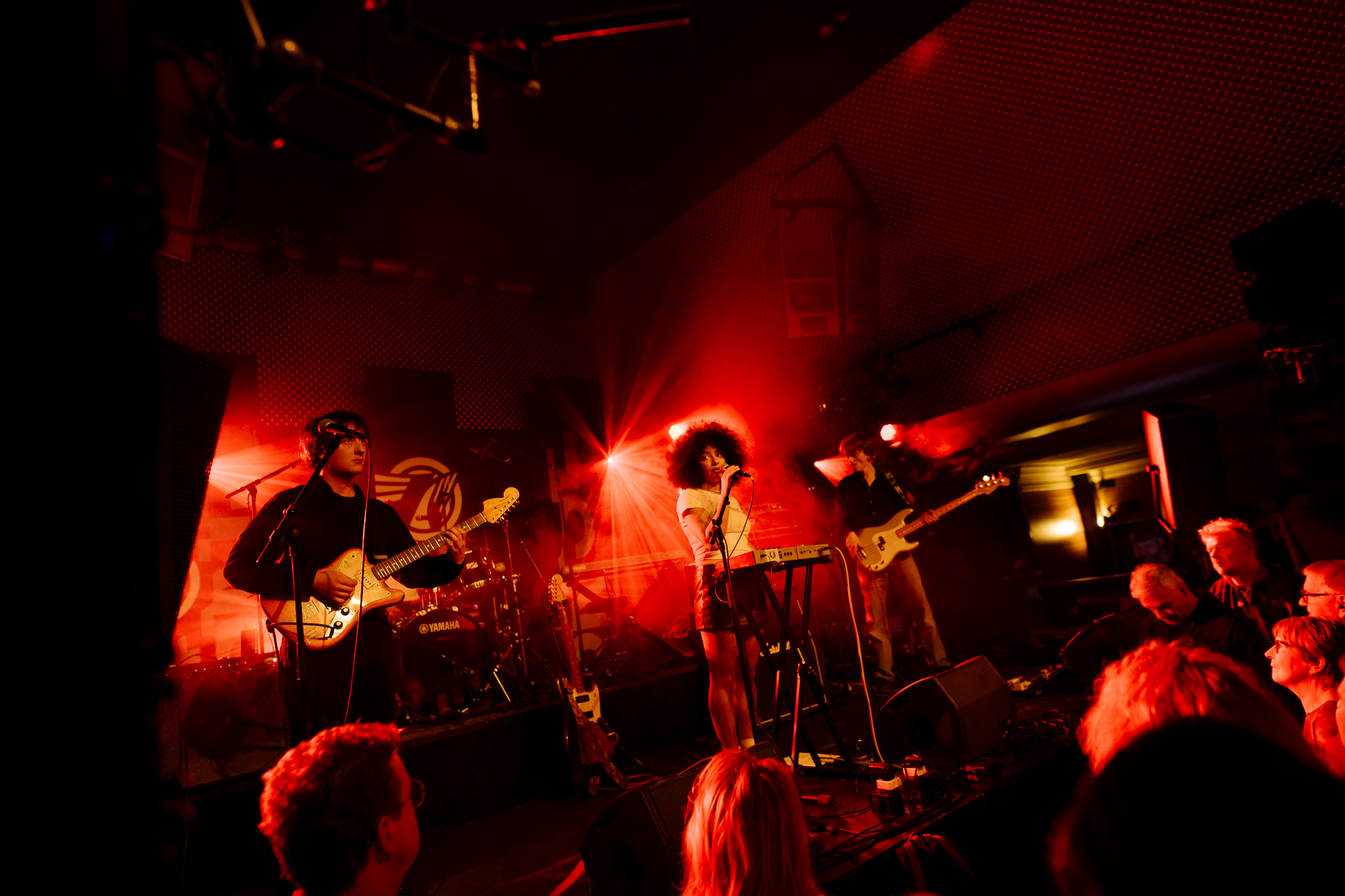
- English Teacher performing in 2024

Background information
- Origin: Leeds, West Yorkshire, England
- Genres: Indie rock, art rock, post-punk
- Years active: 2020–present
- Labels: Island; Nice Swan Records
- Spinoff of: Frank
- Members: Lily Fontaine; Lewis Whiting; Douglas Frost; Nicholas Eden
- Website: englishteacherband.com

English Teacher are an English indie rock band who formed in 2020. They consist of vocalist Lily Fontaine, guitarist Lewis Whiting, drummer Douglas Frost, and bassist Nicholas Eden. In 2024, the group won the Mercury Music Prize for their debut studio album This Could Be Texas, released through Island Records.

== History ==
The band met at Leeds Conservatoire. They originally started as a dream pop band called 'Frank' in 2018 before playing their first gig as English Teacher in 2020. Frontwoman Lily Fontaine said of the shift: "The band that we were before, and the band that we are now, are so different. I think we've benefited from having time to figure ourselves out."

The band's first single, 2021's R&B, garnered both critical praise and mainstream radio play. The song sees Fontaine consider her place in the white, male world of indie-rock as a mixed race woman. They released the EP Polyawkward in April 2022 through Nice Swan Records. NME called it " a deliciously sour debut EP, set to a soundtrack of restless art-punk." The band appeared on Later... with Jools Holland in November 2023. Their song "Nearly Daffodils" was named one of the 10 best songs of 2023 by Time magazine.

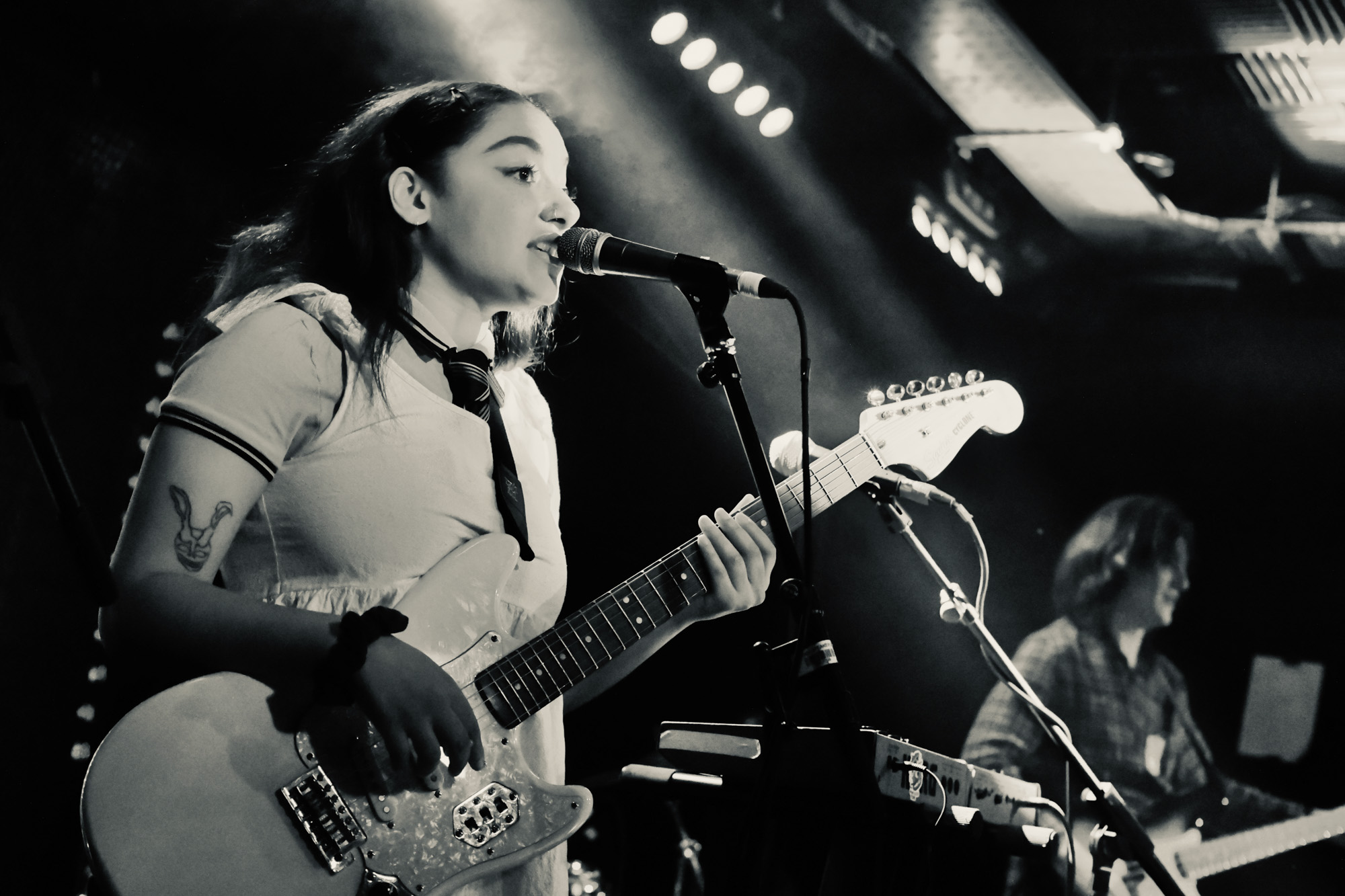
Fontaine and Eden at Camden Assembly, London, April 2022

In January 2024, the band announced their debut album This Could Be Texas, which was released on 12 April through Island Records. The album was well received by critics, winning the 2024 Mercury Prize. 2024 also saw English Teacher named Newcomer of the Year at the Northern Music Awards.

=== This Could Be Texas ===
English Teacher released their debut studio album, This Could Be Texas, on 12 April 2024 through Island Records. The album received widespread critical acclaim. The Line of Best Fit suggested it "could be one of the finest debuts of the decade, with every band member shining in their ability and craftsmanship." It also lauded the band's "Northern charm". On 5th September 2024, it was announced that the album won the 2024 Mercury Prize. Judges said their album stood out "for its originality and character" and displayed a "fresh approach to the traditional guitar band format”. English Teacher’s Mercury Prize win ended a nine-year streak of London-based talent winning the award, sparking conversation about the disparity in opportunities for musicians across the United Kingdom.

== Band members ==
- Lily Fontaine – lead vocals, rhythm guitar, synthesizer, piano
- Lewis Whiting – lead guitar, synthesizer
- Douglas Frost – drums, piano, synthesizer, backing vocals
- Nicholas Eden – bass guitar

=== Touring members ===
- Blossom Caldarone - cello, piano

== Discography ==
=== Studio albums ===
List of albums, with selected details and peak chart positions
Title	Album details	Peak chart positions					Sales
Title	Album details	UK	UK Phys	UK Sales	BE (FL)	SCO	Sales
This Could Be Texas	Released: 12 April 2024; Label: Island; Format: CD, digital download, LP, streaming	8	3	4	186	5	UK: 14,109

=== Live albums ===
List of albums, with selected details and peak chart positions
Title	Album details	Peak chart positions			
Title	Album details	UK Phys	UK Sales	UK Vinyl	SCO
Live at the Brudenell Social Club	Released: 20 April 2024; Label: Island; Format: LP	50	53	34	89

=== Extended plays ===
List of extended plays, with selected details
Title	Release details
Polyawkward	Released: 22 April 2022; Labels: Nice Swan; Format: download, streaming, vinyl
Live from BBC Maida Vale	Released: 30 August 2024; Labels: Island; Format: download, streaming

=== Singles ===
List of singles, with selected chart positions, showing year released and album name
Title	Year	Peak chart positions			Album
Title	Year	UK Sales	UK Phys	UK Vinyl	Album
"You Won't Believe How Beautiful She Is When It Has Snowed"	2020	—	—	—	Non-album singles
"R&B (Theo Verney Version)"	2021	—	21	13	Non-album singles
"Song About Love"	2023	—	—	—	Non-album singles
"The World's Biggest Paving Slab"	2023	56	7	5	This Could Be Texas
"Nearly Daffodils"	2023	—	—	—	This Could Be Texas
"Mastermind Specialism"	2023	—	—	—	This Could Be Texas
"Albert Road"	2024	—	—	—	This Could Be Texas
"R&B"	2024	—	—	—	This Could Be Texas
"—" denotes release did not chart.

== Videography ==
=== Music videos ===
List of music videos
Title	Year	Director(s)
"R&B (Theo Verney Version)"	2021	Douglas Frost
"Good Grief"	2021	Lily Fontaine
"Polyawkward"	2022	Charles Gall
"Song About Love"	2023	Lily Fontaine
"The World’s Biggest Paving Slab"	2023	Claryn Chong
"Albert Road"	2024	Douglas Frost, Sarah Oglesby
"R&B"	2024	Sarah Oglesby
"The Best Tears of Your Life"	2024	

== Awards and nominations ==
Organisation	Year	Category	Nominated work	Result	Ref.
Youth Music Awards	2022	Rising Star (Artist)	Themselves	Won	
Mercury Prize	2024	Album of the Year	This Could Be Texas	Won	
BBC	2025	Sound of 2025	Themselves	Fifth	
Brit Awards	2025	Best New Artist	Themselves	Nominated	
Youth Music Awards	2025	Grassroots Hero Award	Themselves	Won	
