= Blossom Caldarone =

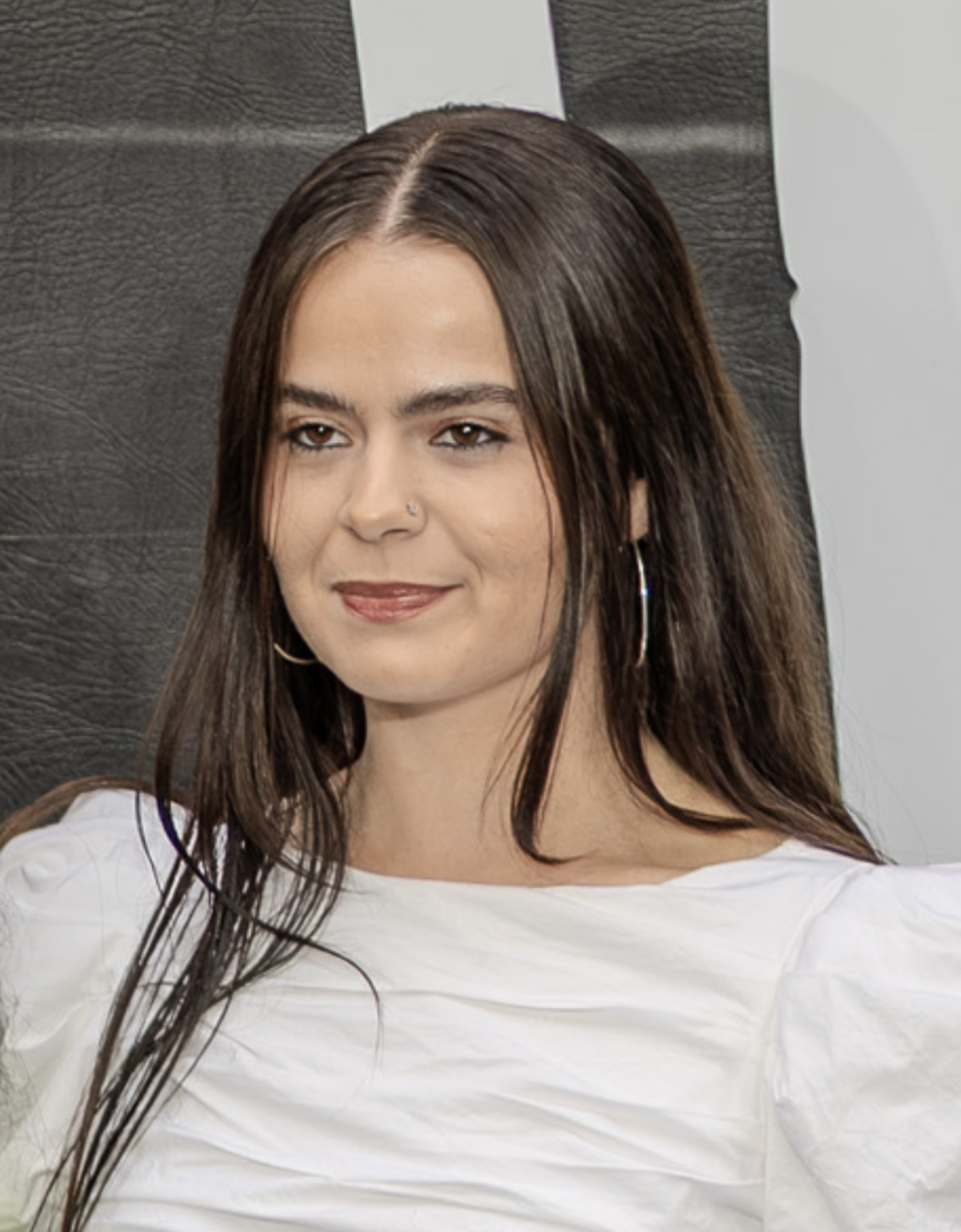
- Caldarone in 2025

Background information
- Born: Blossom Clementina Caldarone; 1999 (age 26–27); Gloucester, England
- Genres: Indie pop; jazz pop
- Instruments: Vocals; cello; piano
- Years active: 2017–present
- Labels: Sid & Ruby Recordings; Machine; Nice Swan Records
- Member of: English Teacher (live)

Blossom Clementina Caldarone (born 1999) is an English singer-songwriter, cellist and pianist. As a solo artist, she has released four EPs. She is also a touring member of the indie rock band English Teacher.

== Early life ==
Caldarone was born in Gloucester and is of Italian descent. She started playing cello at a young age. Caldarone trained at the South West Music School (SWMS) in Bristol until 2015, after which she went to the BRIT School in South London for sixth form.

== Career ==
In 2017, Caldarone released her debut single "Fairytale Lullaby" and EP Sit and Be. "Fairytale Lullaby" was named a hottest track in The Sunday Times. This was followed by the singles "Fickle Friend", "Aldo" and "Life Again" in 2018. She performed at the 2018 All Points East and Bestival.

Caldarone's second EP Not My Stories to Tell was released in 2019 alongside the accompanying singles "Perfect Too" and "House Party No. 1". She performed at the 2020 Great Escape Festival.

In 2020, Caldarone released the singles "Less of a Girl" and "Girlfriends" and collaborated with George Moir on "Lonely" over lockdown. "Lonely" featured on the soundtrack of the Netflix film Hello, Goodbye, and Everything in Between. Caldarone contributed cello and vocals to Black Midi's 2021 sophomore album Cavalcade.

Following the 2022 singles "The Princess Song" and "Fridge Space", Caldarone released her third EP Maybe in Love (Maybe Not) in January 2023. Around this time, she officially joined the indie rock band English Teacher as a touring cellist and pianist. She also performed with The Big Moon. As a solo artists, she had a 2024 Live at Leeds gig.

Caldarone returned to solo releases with the singles "Wreck" and "Secret" in 2025, in the lead-up to her fourth EP Might Smash a Window in 2026.

== Artistry ==
Caldarone grew up listening to the Annie soundtrack. In 2017, it was stated her influences included The Chordettes, The McGuire Sisters and The Supremes, Carole King, Tracy Chapman, Lily Allen, Mallrat and Melody's Echo Chamber. In 2020, she described her nostalgia for Johnny Cash, Billy Joel, Elton John, The Lovin' Spoonful, The Beatles and Mary Hopkin. Her parents would also play Ska when she was growing up.

== Discography ==
=== EPs ===
- Sit and Be (2017)
- Not My Stories to Tell (2019)
- Maybe in Love (Maybe Not) (2023)
- Might Smash a Window (2026)

=== Singles ===
- "Fairytale Lullaby" (2017)
- "Fickle Friend" (2018)
- "Aldo" (2018)
- "Life Again" (2018)
- "Perfect Too" (2019)
- "House Party No 1" (2019)
- "Less of a Girl" (2020)
- "Lonely" (2020) with George Moir
- "Girlfriends" (2020)
- "The Princess Song" (2022)
- "Fridge Space" (2022)
- "Waxing Lyrical" (2025)
- "Wreck" (2026)
- "Secret" (2026)
