= Urban Logistics REIT =

British warehouse investment company

- Company type: Public limited company
- Traded as: LSE: SHED
- Industry: Property investment
- Founded: 2016; 10 years ago
- Headquarters: London, United Kingdom
- Key people: Nigel Rich (chairman); Richard Moffitt ( CEO)
- Revenue: ▲£60.0 million (2024)
- Operating income: ▲£41.5 million (2024)
- Net income: ▲£24.7 million (2024)
- Website: www.urbanlogisticsreit.com

Urban Logistics REIT is a British property investment company which invests in warehouses. The company is structured as a real estate investment trust (REIT). The company was listed on the London Stock Exchange until it was acquired by LondonMetric Property in June 2025.

== History ==
The company was launched on the Alternative Investment Market as Pacific Industrial & Logistics REIT plc in April 2016. It changed its name to Urban Logistics REIT in March 2018. It acquired a portfolio of seven warehouses from Legal & General Investment Management in April 2020, and raised an additional £250 million in capital and transferred to the main market as in December 2021.

In April 2025, it was confirmed that LondonMetric Property would buy the company in a deal worth £674 million. The takeover was approved by the court in June 2025, so allowing the deal to be completed.

== Operations ==
The company specialises in warehouses. Its portfolio was valued at £1.1 billion as at 31 March 2024.
