= Working Men's Club (album) =

Studio album by Working Men's Club
- Released: 2 October 2020
- Studios: McCall Sound Studio, Sheffield
- Genres: Electronic; Industrial; Acid
- Length: 47:00
- Label: Heavenly
- Producer: Ross Orton

Working Men's Club chronology
Working Men's Club (2020)	Fear Fear (2022)

Singles from Working Men's Club
- 1. "Teeth" Released: 23 August 2019; 2. "White Rooms & People" Released: 10 February 2020; 3. "Valleys" Released: 23 October 2020

Professional ratings
Aggregate scores
Source	Rating
AnyDecentMusic?	8.1/10
Review scores
Source	Rating
AllMusic	3/5 stars
Clash	8/10
The Guardian	4/5 stars
NME	5/5 stars

Working Men's Club is the debut album by the English band Working Men's Club, released on 2 October 2020 on Heavenly Recordings.

== Critical reception ==
Working Men's Club was met with critical acclaim. At Metacritic, which assigns a normalized rating out of 100 to reviews from mainstream publications, the album received an average score of 83, which indicates "universal acclaim", based on 10 reviews. The record also received an average score of 8.1 from AnyDecentMusic?, a normalized rating out of 10.

Clash critic Josh Crowe described the record as something that "could pass as a mixtape, traversing through a medley of sounds, eras and genres", stating that "the one thing consistent throughout are the standout vocals of Minsky-Sargeant." Dave Simpson of The Guardian wrote: "The West Yorkshire band take the stark electronics of the post-punk scene and warm them with Detroit techno and Italian house – while addressing Andrew Neil with mischievous one-liners."

Ali Shutler of NME was positive about the album, writing, "a world away from their early work, the Todmorden group find chaos in the every day on their superb debut."

Tim Russell of God Is in the TV was also positive, calling Working Men's Club "a very special record, inspired by a fairly specific past but managing to sound fresh, contemporary and original, due in no small part to the precocious talent and charisma of singer Syd Minsky-Sargeant, a true star in the making."

Matthew Horton of The Quietus drew comparisons to New Order, The Fall and OMD, while alleging a lack of originality. He concluded, however, that this "intrepid, cocksure debut" is "just fantastically listenable, decisive, a promise of fun things to come".

=== Accolades ===
Accolades for Working Men's Club
Publication	Accolade	Rank	Ref.
God Is in the TV	GIITV's 10 Albums of the Year for 2020	1	
Les Inrockuptibles	Notre top 100 des albums 2020	2	
OOR	DIT ZIJN DE 20 BESTE ALBUMS VAN 2020	11	
Mondo Sonoro	Los mejores discos internacionales de 2020	21	

== Track listing ==
All tracks are written by Sydney Minsky-Sargeant.

No.	Title	Length
1.	"Valleys"	6:30
2.	"A.A.A.A."	3:06
3.	"John Cooper Clarke"	5:27
4.	"White Rooms & People"	2:31
5.	"Outside"	2:51
6.	"Be My Guest"	3:56
7.	"Tomorrow"	4:05
8.	"Cook a Coffee"	2:51
9.	"Teeth"	3:41
10.	"Angel"	12:30
Total length:		47:00
