= Sherelle =

British DJ

- Born: Sherelle Camille Thomas; 3 September 1993 (age 32)
- Origin: London, England
- Genres: Footwork, jungle, experimental
- Years active: 2015–present
- Labels: Beautiful; Hooversound

Sherelle Camille Thomas (born 3 September 1993), known mononymously as Sherelle (stylized in all caps), is a British DJ and electronic musician. With a background in dancehall and rave music, Sherelle is best known for her DJ sets and mixes. Sherelle is also known for co-founding the label Hooversound with Naina and for founding Beautiful (stylized in all caps), a label and musical project for Black and LGBT musicians.

== Early life ==
Sherelle was raised in Walthamstow, East London by her mother and sister. She grew up listening to dancehall, R&B and hip hop music, pirated through her family TV. She also grew up playing football and is a fan of Arsenal F.C.

She was a presenter on the South London station Reprezent whilst attending Goldsmiths University. She completed radio courses before being given her own specialist slot on the station playing footwork and jungle. She eventually held a slot on BBC Radio 1 as a part of their Radio 1 Residency until 2021. She now has a slot on NTS alongside label co-owner and Apple Music 1's NAINA. Sherelle is openly gay. Sherelle is also vegan.

== Career ==
Sherelle's breakthrough was with her 2019 Boiler Room DJ set, which went viral and allowed her to take up music full-time. In September 2019, she participated in the BBC Radio 1 residency series, featuring guestmixes and interviews from 4hero, Goldie, and Virgil Abloh. In 2020, she was recognized by DJ Mag as the year's best British DJ. Sherelle was also recognized as the 2020 BBC Radio 1 Essential Mix winner.

In July 2021, her debut EP, 160 Down the A406, was met with positive reviews, and was acclaimed by Resident Advisor as "one of the year's most exciting production debuts."

In October 2021, Sherelle released her first clothing collection, a collaboration with Boiler Room.

She gained wider recognition with her recorded mix for fabric, fabric presents SHERELLE, released in November 2021. The mix was met with positive reviews, with particular praise for its high level of intensity and genre mixing. Pitchfork described the mix as "compressing decades of dancing to tightly woven two- and three-minute segments" which "catalogs a moment in which a new generation is grasping and reshaping a raving past that's too distant for them to remember."

Until its disbandment in January 2022, Sherelle was a member of the all-female and non-binary DJ group 6 Figure Gang.

From 16 September 2023, SHERELLE started hosting a new weekly show on BBC Radio 6 Music airing on Saturday nights, following the departure of fellow DJ The Blessed Madonna.

== Style ==
Sherelle is known for the 160 beats per minute pacing in her music. She often mixes music released over the course of several decades. Her DJ sets and mixes have been described as Footwork, Hardcore and Jungle.

== Discography ==
=== Albums ===
- WITH A VENGEANCE (2025)

=== Extended plays ===
- 160 Down the A406 (2021)

=== Remixes ===
- Visited By Astronauts (SHERELLE Had A Groove Remix) (with Lone) (2022)
- Since I (SHERELLE’S in a K Hole Remix) (with Real Lies) (2022)
- NEON RATS (SHERELLE's Sleepless in Philadelphia Remix) (with Moderat) (2023)
- SIMONA 'ADENTRO DE MÍ SHERELLE 160 BPM (2023)

=== DJ mixes ===
- BBC Radio 1 Essential Mix (2020)
- fabric presents SHERELLE (2021)

=== Singles ===
- "JUNGLE TEKNAH (Fabric)" (2021)
- "Gentrification" (a part of the This is BEAUTIFUL compilation) (2021)
- "Higher (with Daniel Avery)" (2022)
- "Ultra Truth (with Daniel Avery)" (2022)
- I. JORDAN - "M1, M3" // SHERELLE - "GETOUTOFMYHEAD" (2023)
- "HENRY'S REVENGE" (2024)
