= HSBC Bank =

HSBC Bank may refer to any one of the following principal local banks or divisions of the HSBC Group:

== Americas ==
- HSBC Bank USA
  - HSBC Finance, a specialized lending subsidiary
- HSBC Bank Argentina
- HSBC Bank Bermuda
- HSBC Bank Canada
- HSBC Bank (Chile)
- HSBC México
- HSBC Bank Panama

== Asia-Pacific ==
- HSBC (Hong Kong)
  - PayMe, its local payment service
- HSBC Bank (China)
- HSBC Bank Australia
- HSBC Bank India
- HSBC Bank Malaysia
- HSBC Sri Lanka
- HSBC Bank (Taiwan)

== Europe ==
- HSBC UK
  - M&S Bank, its subsidiary
  - First Direct, its direct banking division
- HSBC Continental Europe in the euro area
  - HSBC Trinkaus in Germany
  - HSBC Bank Malta
- HSBC Bank Polska
- HSBC Bank (Turkey)

== Other geographies ==
- HSBC Bank Egypt
- HSBC Bank Middle East
- HSBC Saudi Arabia, joint venture between HSBC and Saudi Awwal Bank

== Global divisions ==
- HSBC Expat, an offshore banking services provider based in Jersey
- HSBC InvestDirect, an electronic trading platform
- HSBC Private Bank

== Others ==
- Hang Seng Bank, a bank in Hong Kong that is majority-owned by HSBC
- Banco Davivienda El Salvador, formerly HSBC El Salvador
- HSBC Bank Georgia, closed in 2011
- HSBC Bank (Brazil), sold in 2016
