= HSBC =

British bank and financial services group

HSBC Holdings plc

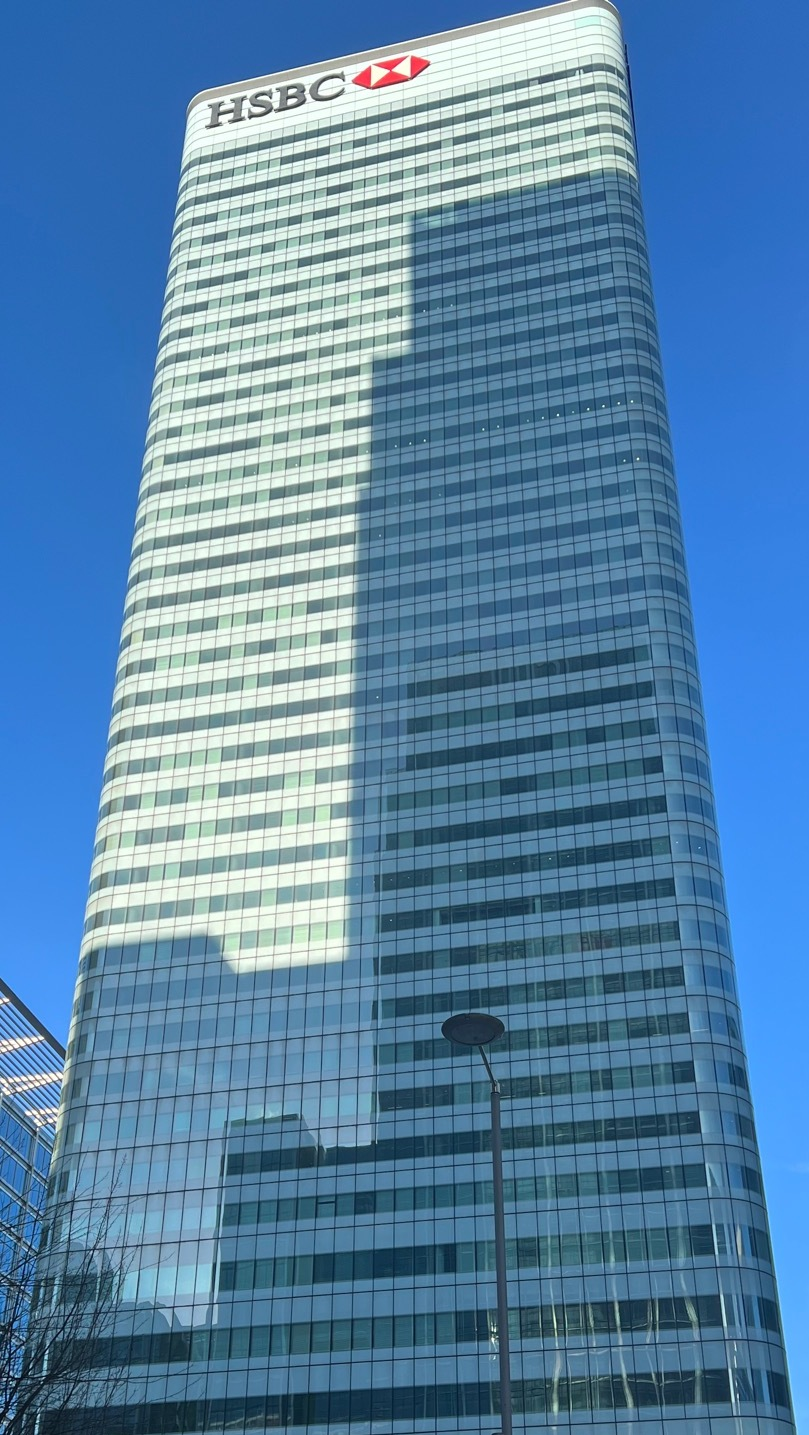
- Headquarters at 8 Canada Square in Canary Wharf, London
- Type: Public
- Traded as: LSE: HSBA; SEHK: 5; NYSE: HSBC; BSX: HSBC.BH; FTSE 100 component (HSBA); Hang Seng Index component (5)
- ISIN: GB0005405286
- Industry: Financial services
- Founded: First established on 3 March 1865; 161 years ago in British Hong Kong (as The Hongkong and Shanghai Bank); First incorporated on 14 August 1866; 160 years ago (as The Hongkong and Shanghai Banking Corporation); 25 March 1991; 35 years ago in London (as HSBC Holdings plc, as parent holding company to the entity in Hong Kong now as a subsidiary)
- Founder: Sir Thomas Sutherland
- Headquarters: 8 Canada Square, London, England
- Area served: Worldwide
- Key people: Brendan Nelson (Group Chairman); Georges Elhedery (Group Chief Executive)
- Products: Asset management; Banking; Commodities; Credit cards; Equities trading; Insurance; Investment management; Mortgage loans; Private equity; Wealth management
- Revenue: ▲US$64.424 billion (2025)
- Operating income: ▼US$27.996 billion (2025)
- Net income: ▼US$23.131 billion (2025)
- Total assets: ▲US$3,233.034 billion (2025)
- Total equity: ▲US$205.666 billion (2025)
- Number of employees: 211,000 (2026)
- Subsidiaries: Subsidiaries: Hang Seng Bank; HSBC Bank Australia; HSBC Bank Bermuda; HSBC Bank India; HSBC Bank Hong Kong; HSBC Trinkaus; HSBC Bank Malaysia; HSBC México; HSBC Bank Middle East; HSBC Sri Lanka; HSBC Bank USA; HSBC Finance; HSBC UK; M&S Financial Services; HSBC Innovation Bank Limited
- Capital ratio: Tier 1 14.9% (2025)
- Website: hsbc.com

HSBC Holdings plc (Chinese: 滙豐; lit. 'focus of wealth') is a British universal bank and financial services group headquartered in London, England, with historical and business links to East Asia and a multinational footprint. According to S&P Global's April 2026 report, HSBC is Europe's second-largest bank by assets, with $3.212 trillion in assets. This also puts it as the eighth-largest bank in the world by total assets and the third-largest non-state owned bank in the world.

HSBC traces its origins to a hong trading house in British Hong Kong. The bank was established in 1865 in Hong Kong and opened branches in Shanghai in the same year. It was formally incorporated in 1866 as the Hongkong and Shanghai Banking Corporation. In 1991, the current parent company, HSBC Holdings plc, was established in London and the historic Hong Kong–based bank from which the group took its name became that entity's wholly owned subsidiary. The following year (1992), HSBC took over Midland Bank, becoming one of the largest domestic banks in the United Kingdom.

HSBC has offices, branches and subsidiaries in 57 countries and territories across Africa, Asia, Oceania, Europe, North America, and South America, serving around 39 million customers. As of 2025, it was ranked number 15 in the world in the Forbes Global 2000, a ranking of large companies made by Forbes by sales, profits, assets, and market value. HSBC has a primary share listing on the London Stock Exchange and branch listings on the Hong Kong Stock Exchange and the Bermuda Stock Exchange. Its shares are also listed on the New York Stock Exchange through the American depositary receipt programme. It is a constituent of the Hang Seng Index and the FTSE 100 Index.

== History ==
=== Foundation ===
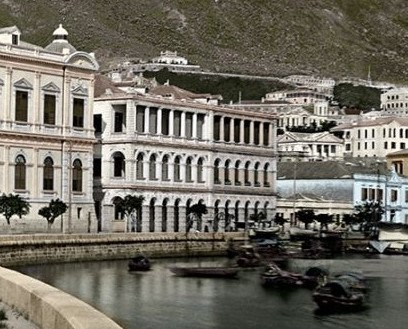
Wardley House on the Hong Kong Praya (waterfront), where the bank had leased its first Hong Kong office in 1865

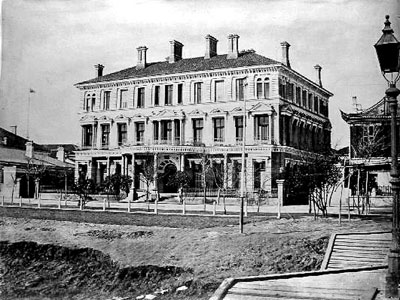
Former Shanghai Club building on No. 12 Bund, Shanghai, purchased by HSBC in 1874 and its Shanghai head office until reconstruction in the early 1920s

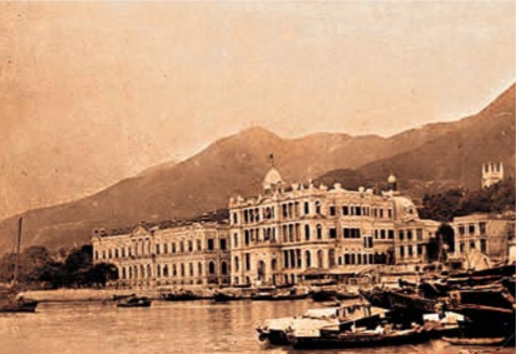
The bank's first purpose-built head office building in Hong Kong (center right), designed by Clement Palmer and completed in 1886 on the former Wardley House location

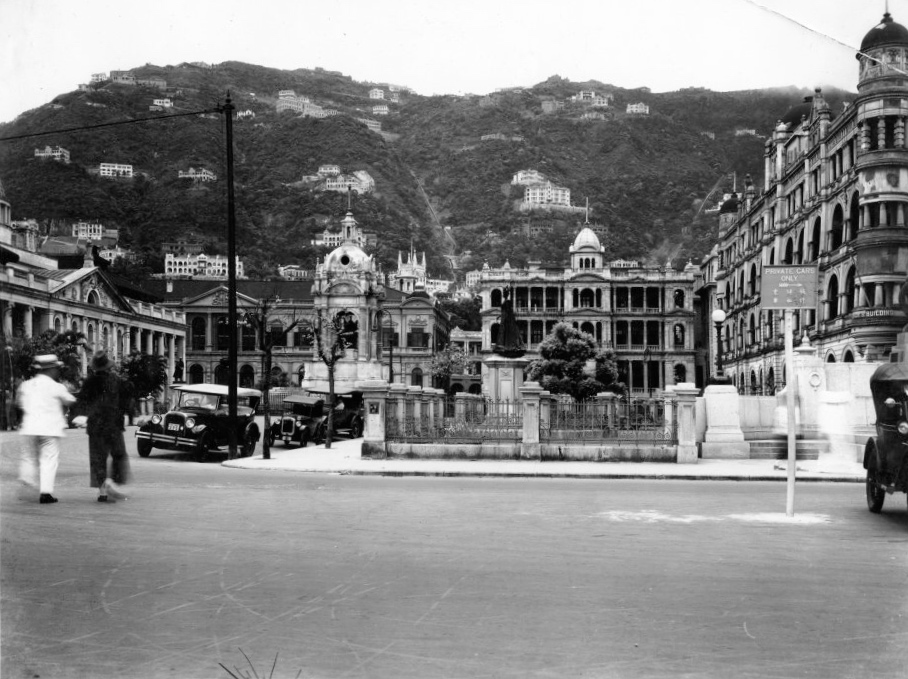
The same building (center right) following the Praya Reclamation Scheme and creation of Statue Square

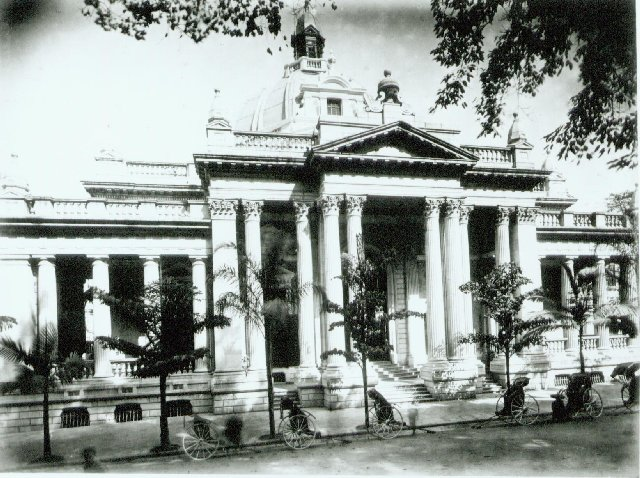
Rear façade of the 1886 building on Queen's Road, photographed in 1890

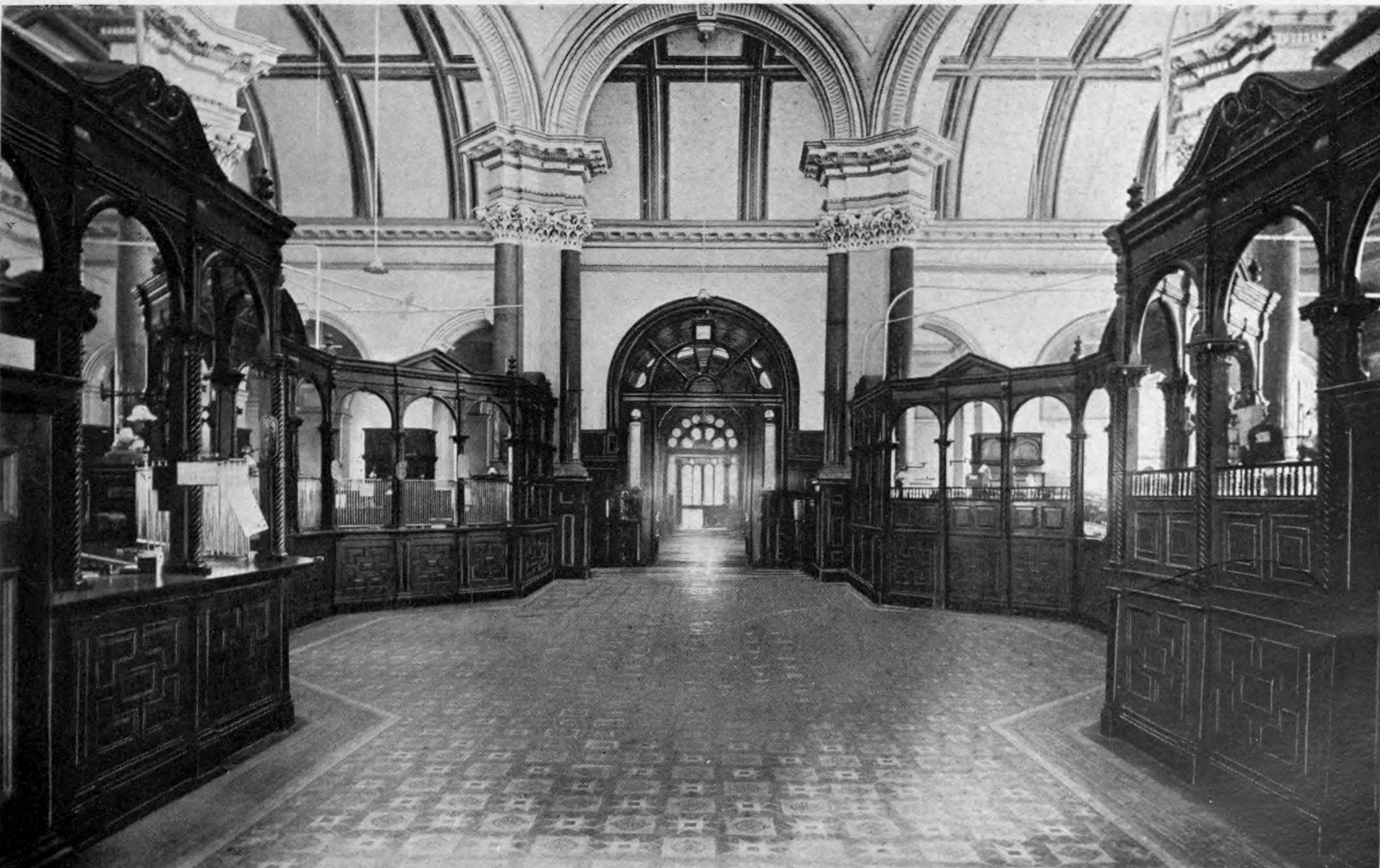
HSBC Hong Kong banking hall in 1908

After the British established Hong Kong as a crown colony in the aftermath of the First Opium War, merchants from other parts of the British Empire, now in Hong Kong, felt the need for a bank to finance the growing trade, through Hong Kong and sometimes also through Shanghai, between China and India, the rest of the British Empire and Europe, of goods, produces and merchandises of all kinds, but especially opium, cultivated in or transited (re-exported) through the Raj.

The founder, Thomas Sutherland of P&O, wanted a bank operating on "sound Scottish banking principles". Still, the original location of the bank was considered crucial and the founders chose Wardley House in Hong Kong since the construction was based on some of the best feng shui in colonial Hong Kong.

After raising a capital stock of HK$5 million, the bank commenced operations on 3 March 1865. It opened a branch in Shanghai in April of that year and started issuing locally denominated banknotes in both the Crown Colony and Shanghai soon afterwards. The bank was incorporated in Hong Kong as The Hongkong and Shanghai Banking Corporation by the Hongkong and Shanghai Bank Ordinance (Numbers 2 and 5 of 1866), and a branch in Japan was also established in Yokohama in 1866. Shares of the bank were one of 13 securities initially traded on the Shanghai Stock Exchange, and were traded on that exchange until the Japanese closed the exchange in 1941.

=== Business development ===
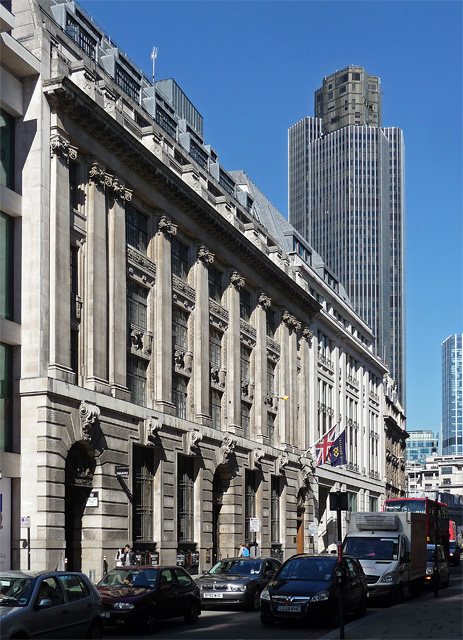
First purpose-built HSBC London office on Gracechurch Street (1913, designed by William Campbell-Jones), replacing leased offices at 31 Lombard Street; maintained by HSBC until relocation to 99 Bishopsgate in 1976, and later converted into a Club Quarters hotel and Wetherspoons pub

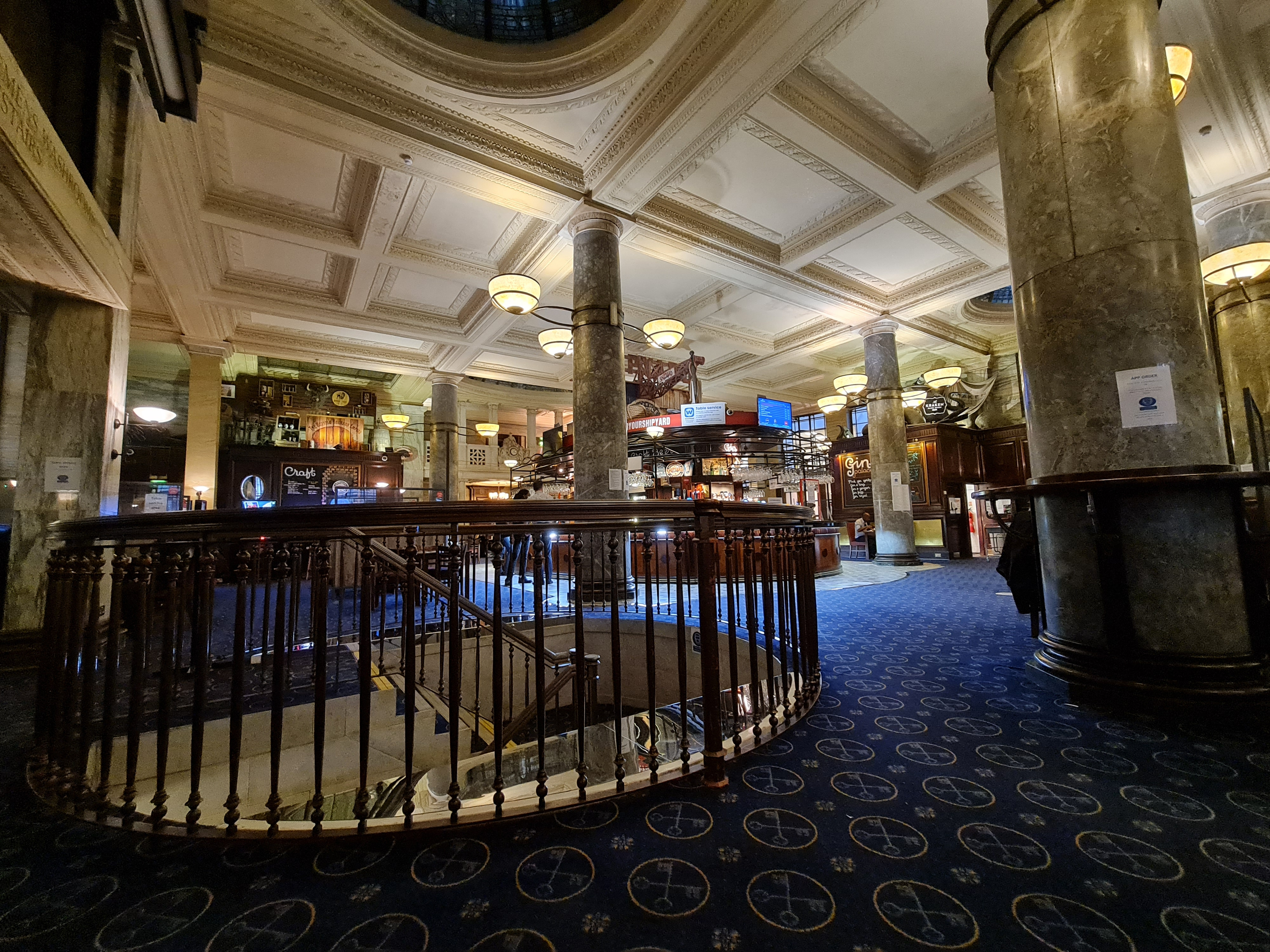
The former HSBC banking hall in the Gracechurch Street building, converted as the Crosse Keys pub

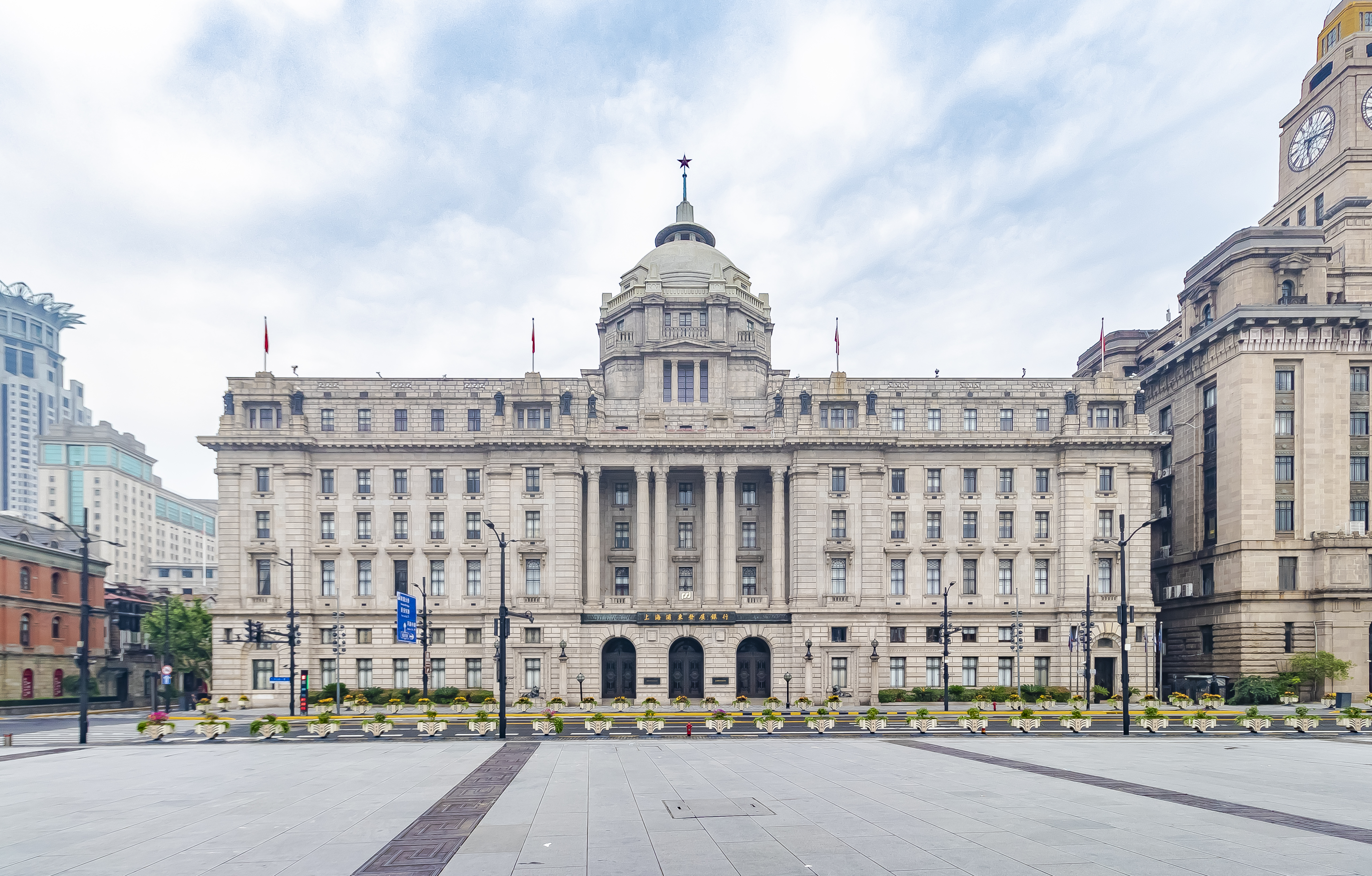
HSBC Building on the Bund, the bank's Shanghai headquarters from 1923 to 1955, photographed in 2021

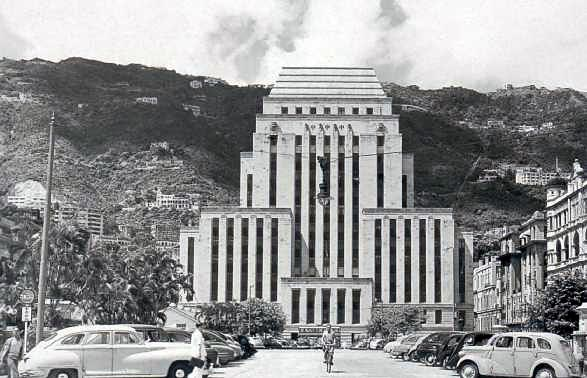
HSBC Hong Kong head office in 1936 after reconstruction

Sir Thomas Jackson became chief manager in 1876. During his twenty-six-year tenure, the bank became a leader in Asia. A period of expansion followed, with new buildings constructed in Bangkok (1921), Manila (1922) and Shanghai (1923), and a new head office building in Hong Kong in 1935. Bank note issuance displaced other forms of the era and of the region, such as silver taels, due to political and economic instability. HSBC gained significant influence as a result.

=== International expansion ===
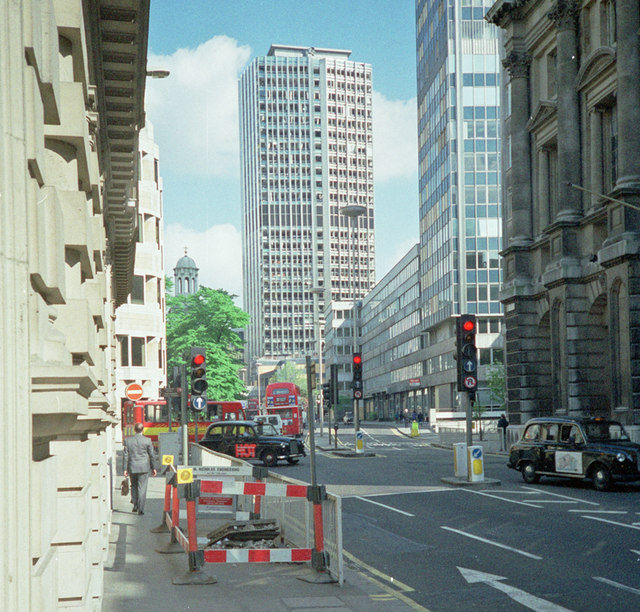
Tower at 99 Bishopsgate, HSBC's main London office from 1976 to 1993 and occupied by the bank until its move to Canary Wharf in 2002-2003

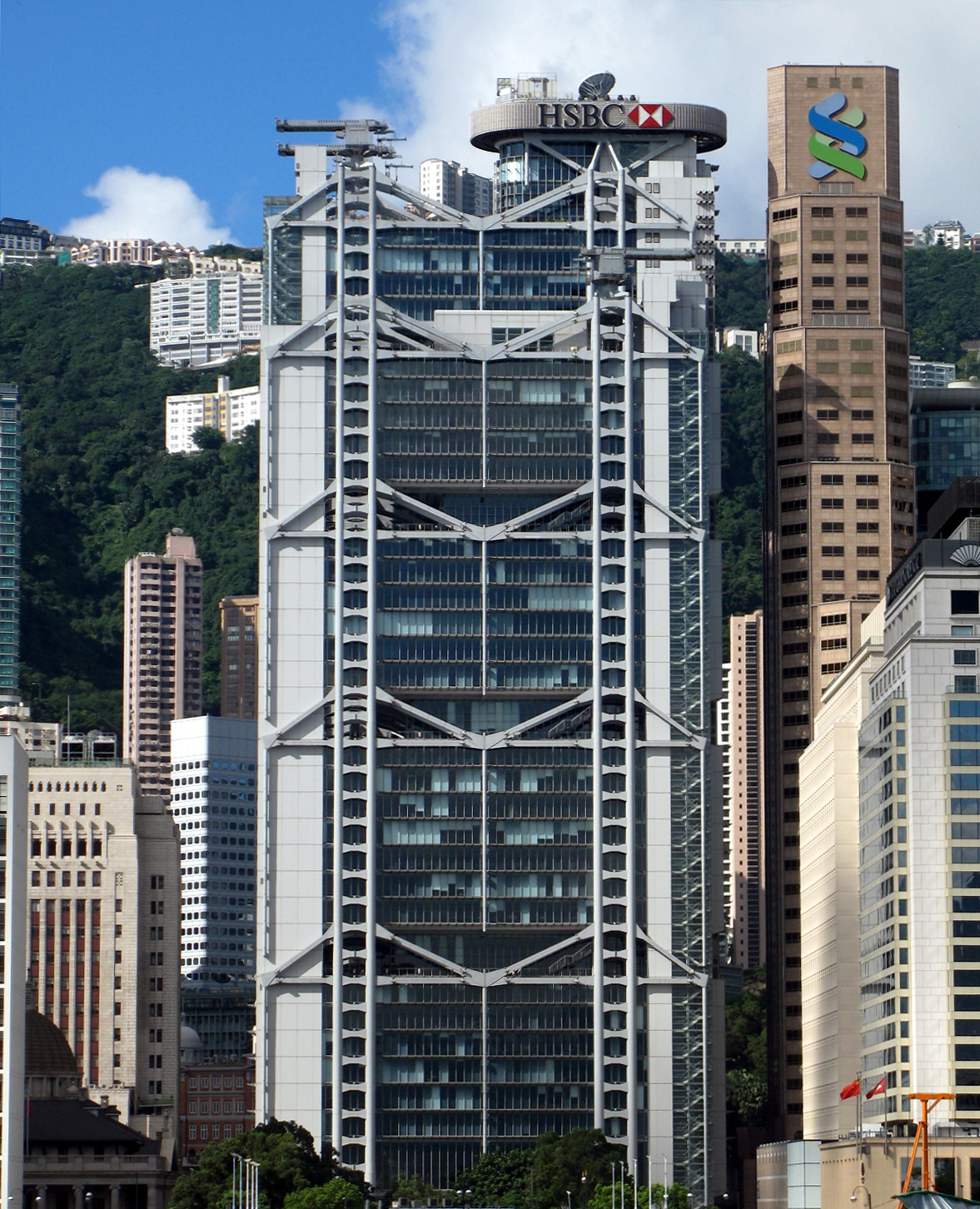
HSBC Main Building, Hong Kong, designed by Norman Foster and completed in 1985 on the same location as the 1886 and 1936 predecessors

Michael Turner became chief manager in 1953 and set about diversifying the business. His tenure came to an end in 1962 having established The Hong Kong and Shanghai Banking Corporation of California 1955 and having acquired The British Bank of the Middle East and the Mercantile Bank (based in India) in Aug 1959. Turner was succeeded in 1962 by Jake Saunders. In 1964 the Chief Managership was superseded as the top executive role in the bank by an Executive Chairmanship.

During the Konfrontasi period in the 1960s, a group of Indonesian forces bombed the MacDonald House building in Singapore (at the time used by HSBC) just a few months after Singapore was granted its independence from Malaysia. Three people were killed, 33 injured, and the two Indonesian military officers responsible for the bombing were tried and executed.

The present building in Hong Kong was designed by Sir Norman Foster and was held as one of the most expensive and technologically advanced buildings in the world in 1986, costing HK$5.3 billion.

=== Creation of the HSBC Group ===
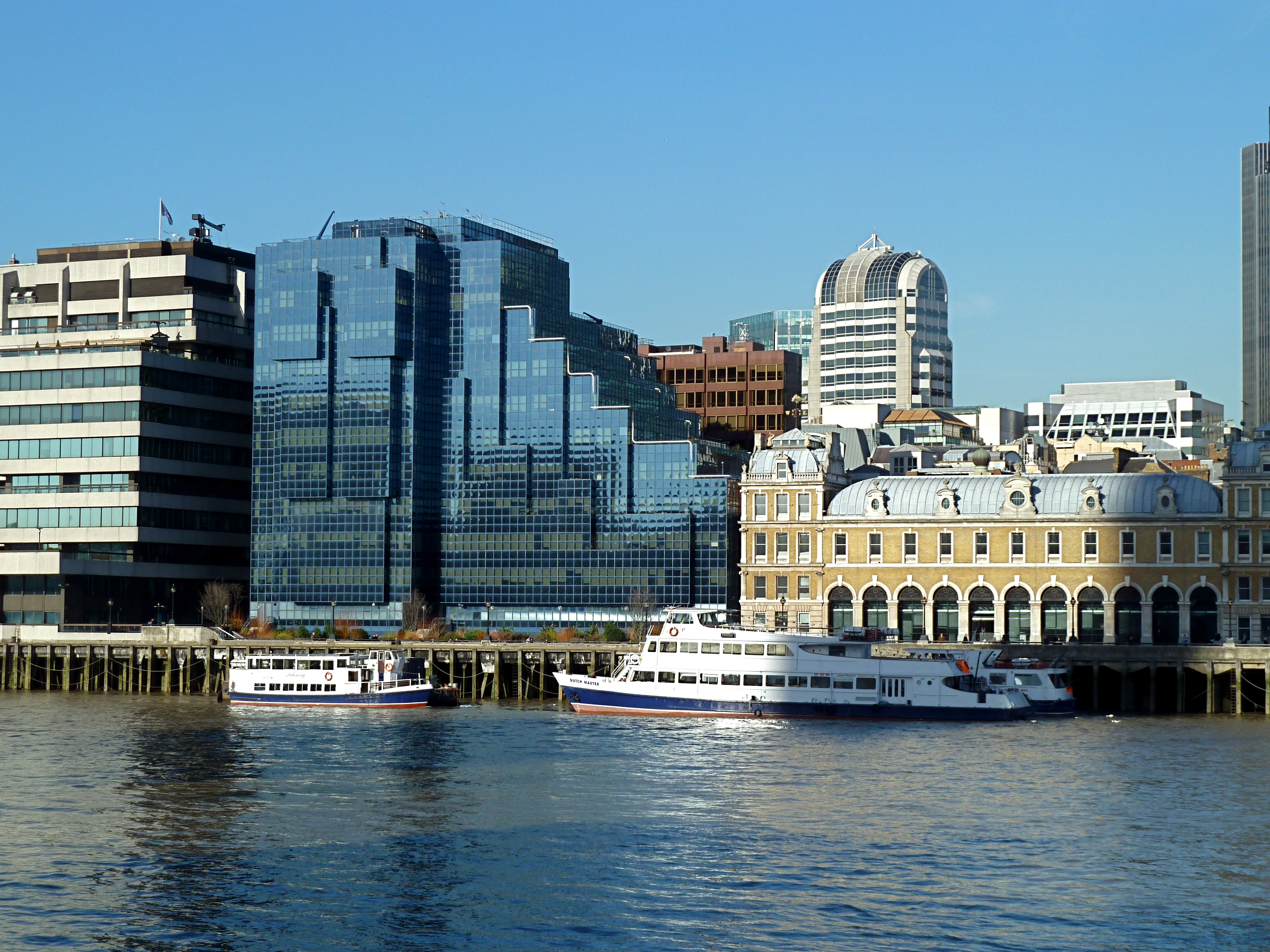
Building at 10 Lower Thames Street in London, completed in 1989, occupied by Samuel Montagu & Co., then used by HSBC Holdings as global head office from 1993 to relocation to Canary Wharf in 2002–2003; eventually sold by the bank in May 2011

On 6 October 1989, it was registered as a regulated bank with the Banking Commissioner of the Government of Hong Kong.

HSBC Holdings plc, originally incorporated in England and Wales, was a non-trading, dormant shelf company when it completed its transformation on 25 March 1991 into the parent holding company to the Hongkong and Shanghai Banking Corporation Limited now as a subsidiary, in preparation for its purchase of the UK-based Midland Bank and the impending transfer of sovereignty of Hong Kong to China. HSBC Holdings' acquisition of Midland Bank was completed in 1992 and gave HSBC a substantial market presence in the United Kingdom. As part of the takeover conditions for the acquisition of the bank thereof, HSBC Holdings plc was required to relocate its world headquarters from Hong Kong to London in 1993.

Major acquisitions in South America started with the purchase of the Banco Bamerindus of Brazil for $1 billion in March 1997 and the acquisition of Roberts SA de Inversiones of Argentina for $600 million in May 1997. In May 1999, HSBC expanded its presence in the United States with the purchase of Republic National Bank of New York for $10.3 billion.

=== 2000 to 2010 ===
Expansion into Continental Europe took place in April 2000 with the acquisition of Crédit Commercial de France, a large French bank, for £6.6 billion ($8.85 billion). In July 2001 HSBC bought Demirbank, an insolvent Turkish bank. In July 2002, Arthur Andersen announced that HSBC USA, Inc., through a new subsidiary, Wealth and Tax Advisory Services USA Inc. (WTAS), would purchase a portion of Andersen's tax practice. The new HSBC Private Client Services Group would serve the wealth and tax advisory needs of high-net-worth individuals. Then in August 2002 HSBC acquired Grupo Financiero Bital, SA de CV, Mexico's third largest retail bank for $1.1 billion.

In November 2002, HSBC expanded further in the United States. Under the chairmanship of John Bond, it spent £9 billion (US$15.5 billion) to acquire Household Finance Corporation (HFC), a US credit card issuer and subprime lender. In a 2003 cover story, The Banker noted "when banking historians look back, they may conclude that [it] was the deal of the first decade of the 21st century". Under the new name of HSBC Finance, the division was the second largest subprime lender in the United States.

The new headquarters of HSBC Holdings at 8 Canada Square, London officially opened in April 2003.

In July 2003, HSBC announced that it had agreed to acquire 82.19% of the Korean fund administrator, Asset Management Technology (AM TeK), for $12.47 million in cash; it was the largest fund administrator in South Korea, with $24 billion of assets under administration. In September 2003 HSBC bought Polski Kredyt Bank SA of Poland for $7.8 million. In June 2004 HSBC expanded into China buying 19.9% of the Bank of Communications of Shanghai. In the United Kingdom HSBC acquired Marks & Spencer Retail Financial Services Holdings Ltd for £763 million in December 2004. Acquisitions in 2005 included Metris Inc, a US credit card issuer for $1.6 billion in August and 70.1% of Dar es Salaam Investment Bank of Iraq in October. In April 2006, HSBC bought the 90 branches in Argentina of Banca Nazionale del Lavoro for $155 million. In December 2007 HSBC acquired the Chinese Bank in Taiwan. In May 2008, HSBC acquired IL&FS Investment, an Indian retail broking firm. On 3 August 2008, HSBC began its banking operations in Algeria with the opening of a branch in Algiers.

In 2005, Bloomberg Markets magazine accused HSBC of money laundering for drug dealers and state sponsors of terrorism. Subsequent investigation indicated that it was accurate and proved that the bank was involved in money laundering for the Sinaloa Cartel and throughout Mexico.

In July 2006, HSBC announced that it would acquire Westpac's sub-custody operations in Australia and New Zealand for $112.5 million, making HSBC the leading sub-custody and clearing player in Australia and New Zealand.

In 2007, HSBC wrote down its holdings of subprime-related mortgage securities by $10.5 billion, becoming the first major bank to report its losses due to the unfolding subprime mortgage crisis.

According to Bloomberg, "HSBC is one of world's strongest banks by some measures". When HM Treasury required all UK banks to increase their capital in October 2007, the group transferred £750 million ($1.006 billion) to London within hours, and announced that it had just lent £4 billion ($5.37 billion) to other UK banks.

In March 2009, HSBC announced that it would shut down the branch network of its HSBC Finance arm in the United States, leading to nearly 6,000 job losses and leaving only the credit card business to continue operating. Chairman Stephen Green stated, "HSBC has a reputation for telling it as it is. With the benefit of hindsight, this is an acquisition we wish we had not undertaken." According to analyst Colin Morton, "the takeover was an absolute disaster".

In March 2009, it announced that it had made US$9.3 billion of profit in 2008 and announced a £12.5 billion (US$17.7 billion; HK$138 billion) rights issue to enable it to buy other banks that were struggling to survive. However, uncertainty over the rights issue's implications for institutional investors caused volatility in the Hong Kong stock market: on 9 March 2009 HSBC's share price fell 24.14%, with 12 million shares sold in the last few seconds of trading.

=== 2010 to 2013 ===
On 25 April 2011, HSBC decided to shut down its retail banking business in Russia and reduce its private banking presence to a representative office.

HSBC announced renaming of its Personal Financial Services (PFS) business group to Retail Banking and Wealth Management (also known as RBWM) on HSBC's 2011 Investor Day.

On 11 May 2013, the new chief executive Stuart Gulliver announced that HSBC would refocus its business strategy and that a large-scale retrenchment of operations, particularly in respect of the retail sector, was planned. HSBC would no longer seek to be 'the world's local bank', as costs associated with this were spiraling and US$3.5 billion needed to be saved by 2013, with the aim of bringing overheads down from 55% of revenues to 48%. In 2010, then-chairman Stephen Green planned to depart HSBC to accept a government appointment in the Trade Ministry. Group Chief Executive Michael Geoghegan was expected to become the next chairman. However, while many current and former senior employees supported the tradition of promoting the chief executive to chairman, many shareholders instead pushed for an external candidate. HSBC's board of directors had reportedly been split over the succession planning and investors were alarmed that the row would damage the company.

On 23 September 2010, Geoghegan announced he would step down as chief executive of HSBC. He was succeeded as chief executive by Stuart Gulliver, while Green was succeeded as chairman by Douglas Flint; Flint was serving as HSBC's finance director (chief financial officer). August 2011: Further to CEO Stuart Gulliver's plan to cut $3.5 billion in costs over the next two years, HSBC announced that it will cut 25,000 jobs and exit from 20 countries by 2013 in addition to 5,000 job cuts announced earlier in the year. The consumer banking division of HSBC will focus on the UK, Hong Kong, high-growth markets such as Mexico, Singapore, Turkey, and Brazil, and smaller countries where it has a leading market share. According to Reuters, Chief Executive Stuart Gulliver told the media, "There will be further job cuts. There will be something like 25,000 roles eliminated between now and the end of 2013."

In August 2011 "to align our U.S. business with our global network and meet the local and international needs of domestic and overseas clients", HSBC agreed to sell 195 branches in New York and Connecticut to First Niagara Financial Group Inc, and divestitures to KeyCorp, Community Bank, N.A. and Five Star Bank for around $1 billion, and announced the closure of 13 branches in Connecticut and New Jersey. The rest of HSBC's U.S. network will only be about half from a total 470 branches before divestments. On 9 August 2011, Capital One Financial Corp. agreed to acquire HSBC's U.S. credit card business for $2.6 billion, netting HSBC Holdings an estimated after-tax profit of $2.4 billion. In September it was announced that HSBC sought to sell its general insurance business for around $1 billion.

In 2012, HSBC was the subject of hearings of the U.S. Senate permanent subcommittee for investigations for severe deficiencies in its anti-money laundering practices (see Controversies). On 16 July the committee presented its findings. Among other things, it concluded that HSBC had been transferring $7 billion in banknotes from its Mexican to its US subsidiary (much of it related to drug dealing), was disregarding terrorist financing links and was actively circumventing US safeguards designed to prevent transactions involving terrorists, drug lords and rogue regimes, including hiding $19.4 billion in transactions with Iran. This investigation followed on from a probe by the US Federal Reserve and Office of the Comptroller of the Currency found that there was "significant potential for unreported money laundering or terrorist financing".

On 11 December 2012, HSBC agreed to pay a record $1.92 billion fine in this money laundering case. It was reported that bank officials consistently overlooked internal warnings about the inadequacy of HSBC's monitoring systems, according to the Justice Department. For example, in 2008, the CEO of HSBC Mexico was reportedly informed by Mexican law enforcement about a recording of a Mexican drug lord, who indicated that HSBC Mexico was a preferred location for money laundering. The United States Department of Justice, however, decided not to pursue criminal penalties, a decision which the New York Times labelled a "dark day for the rule of law." HSBC chief executive Stuart Gulliver said: "We accept responsibility for our past mistakes. We have said we are profoundly sorry for them, and we do so again."

=== 2013 to 2020 ===
In July 2013, Alan Keir was appointed chief executive of HSBC UK after Brian Robertson's resignation. Keir's duties include overseeing the firm's UK, European, Middle Eastern, and African divisions.

In June 2014, an indirect wholly owned subsidiary HSBC Life (UK) Limited agreed to sell its £4.2 billion UK pensions business to Swiss Re. In February 2015 the International Consortium of Investigative Journalists released information about the business conduct of HSBC under the title Swiss Leaks based on the 2007 hacked HSBC account records from whistle-blower Hervé Falciani. The ICIJ alleges that the bank profited from doing business with corrupt politicians, dictators, tax evaders, dealers of blood diamonds, arms dealers and other clients. US Senate investigators in 2012 had sought the hacked HSBC account records from Falciani and French authorities, but never received the data.

HSBC announced in August 2015 that it would be selling its Brazilian unit to Banco Bradesco for $5.2 billion following years of disappointing performance. In 2015, HSBC was recognised as the most trusted foreign bank in India by The Brand Trust Report 2015.

In 2016, the bank was mentioned numerous times in connection with the Panama Papers investigation. Many Syrians were angered when their accounts were judged high-risk and closed, despite the bank reportedly telling Mossack Fonseca it was "comfortable" with Rami Makhlouf as a customer, even though US Treasury sanctions against him were in effect at the time.

On 20 March 2017, the British newspaper The Guardian reported that hundreds of banks had helped launder KGB-related funds out of Russia, as uncovered by an investigation named Global Laundromat. HSBC was listed among the 17 banks in the UK that were "facing questions over what they knew about the international scheme and why they did not turn away suspicious money transfers," as HSBC "processed $545.3m in Laundromat cash, mostly routed through its Hong Kong branch." Other banks facing scrutiny under the investigation included the Royal Bank of Scotland, NatWest, Lloyds, Barclays and Coutts. In response, HSBC stated that it was against financial crime, and that the case "highlights the need for greater information sharing between the public and private sectors."

On 1 October 2017, Mark Tucker succeeded Douglas Flint as group chairman of HSBC, the first non-executive and outside chairman appointed by the group. Also in October 2017, HSBC announced that John Flint, chief executive of Retail Banking and Wealth Management, would succeed Stuart Gulliver as Group Chief Executive on 21 February 2018. It was further announced on 5 August 2019 that Flint was leaving and his role would be filled on a temporary basis by Noel Quinn, head of HSBC's global commercial bank. Noel Quinn was subsequently appointed to the role on a permanent basis in March 2020.

=== Since 2020 ===
In February 2020, HSBC announced it would cut 35,000 jobs worldwide after it was announced corporate profits decreased by 33% in 2019.

In 2020, HSBC announced merging two of its business lines: Retail Banking and Wealth Management & Global Private Banking to form a new business unit as Wealth and Personal Banking.

In October 2020, HSBC committed to achieve zero-emission by 2050, e.g., by this year it would not only become carbon neutral by itself but also will work only with carbon-neutral clients. It also committed to providing 750–1,000 billion dollars to help clients make the transition. It also pledged to achieve carbon neutrality in its own operations by 2030.

In January 2021, HSBC announced that it would be closing 82 branches in Britain. In May 2021, HSBC announced the exit of US retail banking business by selling 10 California branches to Cathay Bank and 80 branches to Citizens Financial Group and closing the remaining branches. The bank said it intends to focus on the banking and wealth management needs of globally connected affluent and high net worth clients.

In May 2021, HSBC committed to end the financing of the coal industry, with a commitment to publish a new coal policy and provide further detail on its climate strategy by the end of 2021. The organisation's "Thermal Coal Phase-Out Policy" was published in December 2021. The company broke its coal pledge in 2023 when it helped raise $1 billion for Glencore, a mining giant that had ramped up coal production.

In August 2021, HSBC announced the acquisition of Axa Singapore. HSBC Insurance (Asia-Pacific) Holdings Ltd, an indirect wholly owned subsidiary of HSBC would acquire 100% of the issued share capital of Axa Singapore for $575m. In December 2021, HSBC Asset Management (India) Private Ltd, an indirect wholly owned subsidiary of HSBC announced it would acquire L&T Investment Management for $425 million from L&T Finance Holdings.

In June 2022, HSBC announced its intention to sell its business in Russia. This requires approval from the Russian government, and the deal is expected to close in the first half of 2024. The projected loss is $300 million. A possible buyer is the Russian Expobank. In February 2024, the President of Russia allowed HSBC and Expobank to carry out this transaction.

In July 2022, HSBC became the first foreign lender to open a Chinese Communist Party (CCP) committee in its Chinese investment banking subsidiary. The subsidiary, HSBC Qianhai Securities, is a 90% HSBC-owned joint venture.

In November 2022, HSBC announced its intention to exit the Canadian market. Royal Bank of Canada would acquire 100% of the common shares of HSBC Canada for an all-cash purchase price of $13.5 billion, 9.4 times HSBC Canada's estimated 2024 earnings. Completion of the transaction is expected by late 2023, subject to regulatory approvals. HSBC has been under pressure to cut costs and divest non-Asian businesses.

In February 2023, HSBC announced that its profits for the last quarter of 2022 had almost doubled compared to those at the same time the previous year. However, its pre-tax profit actually fell because it absorbed the cost of selling its French retail banking operations. The bank also announced that they were closing 114 branches in the United Kingdom. The move came as more people were using online banking since the pandemic, reducing the need for physical branches. The move has been criticized by Unite.

As interest rates increased globally in May 2023, HSBC Holdings reported a 212% increase in quarterly profit.

In May 2023, HSBC defeated a proposal, backed by its largest stakeholder Chinese insurer Ping An, to consider spinning off its Asia business into a Hong Kong-listed entity.

In November 2023, HSBC agreed to sell its hedge fund administration business in several markets, including Hong Kong, Singapore, Ireland, and Luxembourg to BNP Paribas’ Securities Services.

In December 2023, HSBC Asset Management announced they would be acquiring the Singapore Based Investment manager, Silkroad Property Partners. The proposed acquisition includes Singapore-based SilkRoad Property Partners Pte Ltd, along with its subsidiaries in Hong Kong, Shanghai and Tokyo, and the five general partner entities associated with its active funds. Terms of the agreement were not disclosed. The deal would expand HSBC's real estate fund management capabilities in the region by bringing on board a business with an estimated $2 billion in assets under management, primarily in value-add strategies, as well as a senior team with experience executing deals in the region's major cities.

HSBC announced, in December 2023, that it intended to move its head office from 8 Canada Square to 81 Newgate Street when the lease on the former building expires in 2027.

In 2024, HSBC, as part of the Hong Kong Association of Banks, began developing a roadmap to phase out cheques in the city and switch to electronic payments. According to Hong Kong Interbank Clearing, cheque transactions in Hong Kong fell to HK$488.6 billion (US$62.5 billion) in December, down 13 percent year-on-year. On 30 April 2024, Noel Quinn, the CEO for nearly five years, announced his retirement.

In 2024, HSBC announced an international payments app, Zing, a competitor to Revolut and Wise apps. It will also focus on retail customers and low-cost currency exchange. In January 2025, HSBC decided to shut down the app only one year after its launch, as part of a cost-cutting drive.

In 2024, HSBC Philippines launched "Omni Collect" to allow companies to connect to HSBC's single API to offer and manage payments across multiple channels. "It supports multiple online and offline payment options for customers and delivers transaction data through HSBC’s global digital platform, HSBCnet," the bank Head Art Tanseco said.

On 9 April 2024, HSBC announced the sale of its Argentina business to Galicia for $550 million. HSBC said that the deal awaited government approval but was expected to be finalized by the year-end. HSBC was also approved to exit its Armenia holdings by the central bank in a sale to Ardshinbank on 27 August.

In January 2025, HSBC announced the closure of some of its investment banking units in Europe, UK and US as part of the ongoing restructuring effort by its CEO Georges Elhedery, followed by a new round of investment bank job cuts. These significant revamps were expected to bring $1.8 billion cost savings by the end of 2026.

In May 2025, HSBC announced that group chairman Mark Tucker would retire by the end of 2025 after an eight-year stint at the bank.

In June 2025, HSBC agreed the sales of its custody and depositary bank business in Germany to BNP Paribas. In July 2025, HSBC has announced the sales of its fund administration business in Germany, i.e. Internationale Kapitalanlagegesellschaft (INKA), to a fund managed by BlackFin Capital Partners.

In July 2025, HSBC became the first major UK bank to withdraw from the Net-Zero Banking Alliance, raising concerns about the future participation of other European banks amid shifting political and regulatory priorities.

On 25 September 2025, HSBC announced that it had agreed to sell its retail banking operations in Sri Lanka to Nations Trust Bank, a local financial institution. HSBC stated that it would retain its corporate and institutional banking services in the country following the divestment.

In September 2025, HSBC Asset Management launched a new investment strategy focused on trade finance, called Trade & Working Capital Solutions. The move reflects broader trends in asset management and investment with third party investors.

In October 2025, HSBC announced that it had acquired 100% of Hang Seng Bank for a total of US$14 billion.

In October 2025, FirstRand officially took over the assets and customers of HSBC's South African branch.

In January 2026, it was revealed that HSBC was exploring the option of selling its insurance unit in Singapore, HSBC Life, which would be valued at more than US$1 billion.

In January 2026, HSBC Group Chairman Brendan Nelson was one of the business representatives from the financial sector to accompany UK Prime Minister Sir Keir Starmer at his meeting with CCP General Secretary Xi Jinping and Chinese Premier Li Qiang to discuss trade, investment and national security.

On 12 March 2026, Sun Life and Allianz began considering bids for HSBC Holdings' insurance unit in Singapore. A sale process was initiated in March, with non-binding bids materialising soon.

In March 2026, HSBC announced that it would be engaging in a wave of deep job cuts over the coming years that could ultimately impact around 20,000 roles, or about 10 per cent of its total workforce. This would most heavily impact non-client-facing roles in global service centres as HSBC increases its reliance on AI.

On 31 July 2026, HSBC Australia announced an agreement to sell its portfolio of Australian home loans and personal loans to Blackstone. Also announced was that the remainder of HSBC Australia's retail business that were not included in the sale would be wound down during the 18 months following the announcement. At the time of the announcement, regulatory approval had not been granted.

In October 2026, Reuters reported that HSBC planned to integrate Hang Seng Bank's asset management unit, Hang Seng Investment Management, into HSBC Asset Management, citing two people familiar with the matter. The proposed integration would combine businesses managing approximately $876 billion and $50 billion in assets, respectively. HSBC said it aimed to expand its asset management business but did not confirm the proposed merger.

== Operations ==
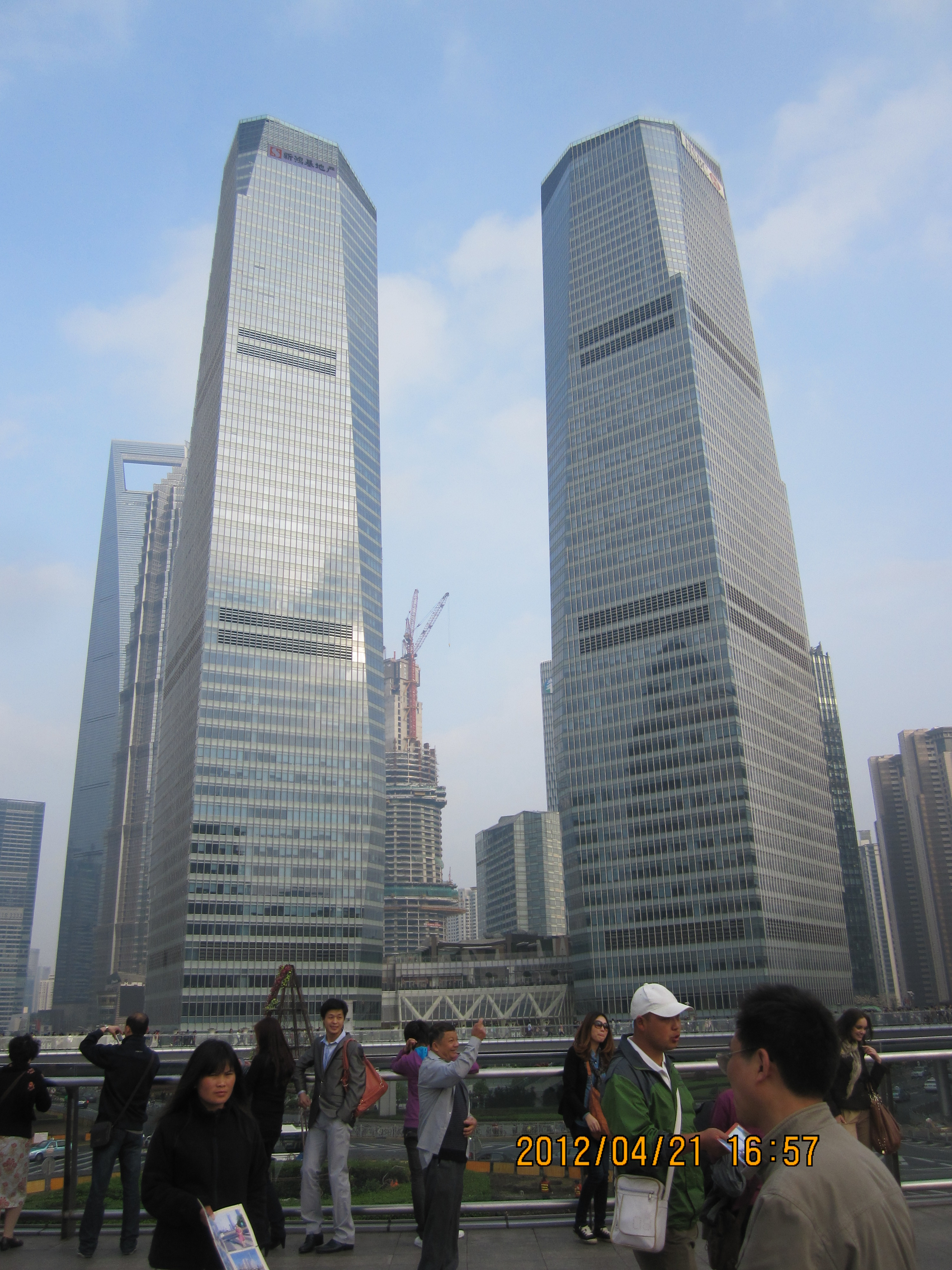
Head office of HSBC Bank (China) in the north tower of Shanghai IFC (right)

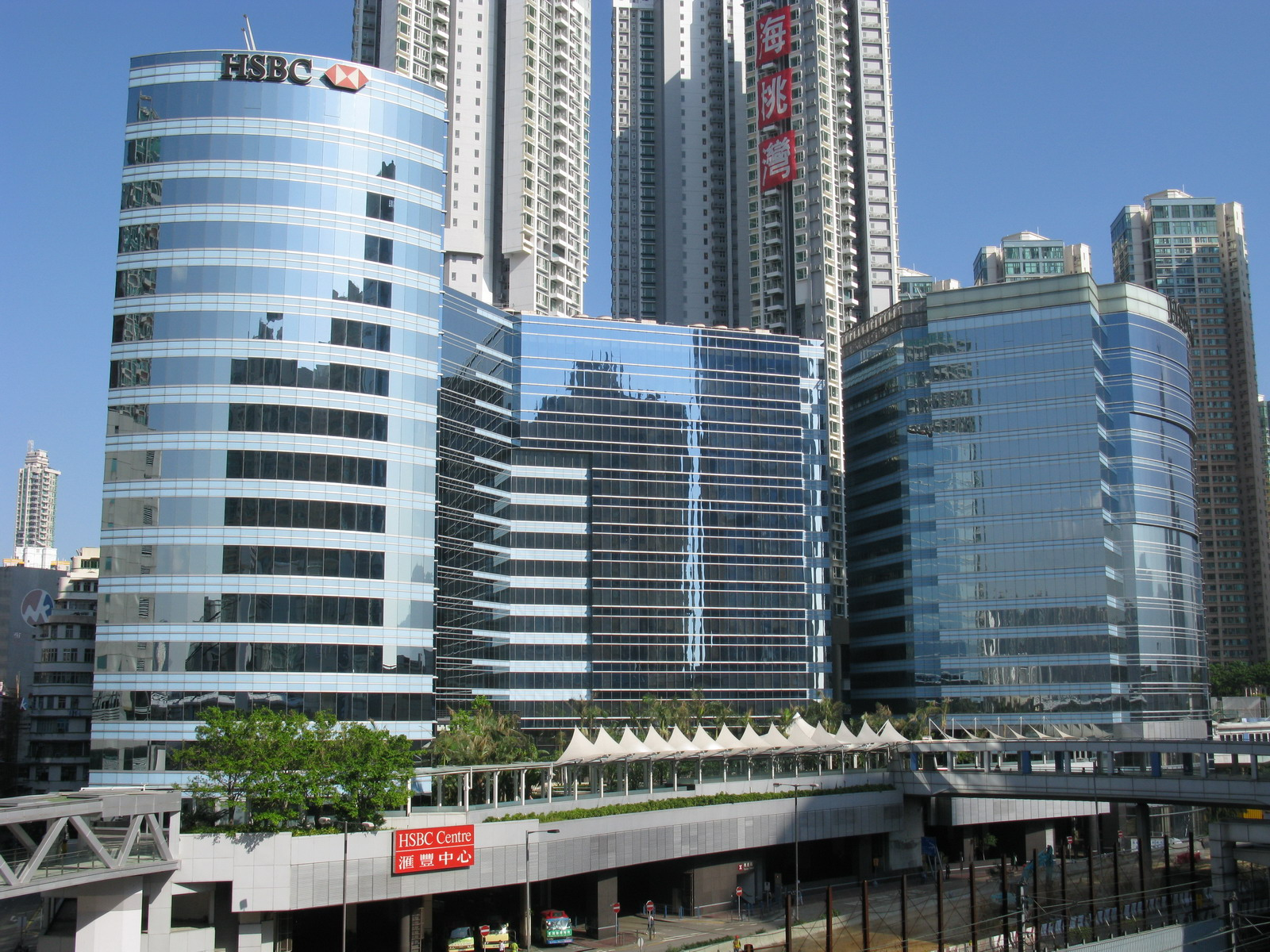
HSBC Centre, Hong Kong

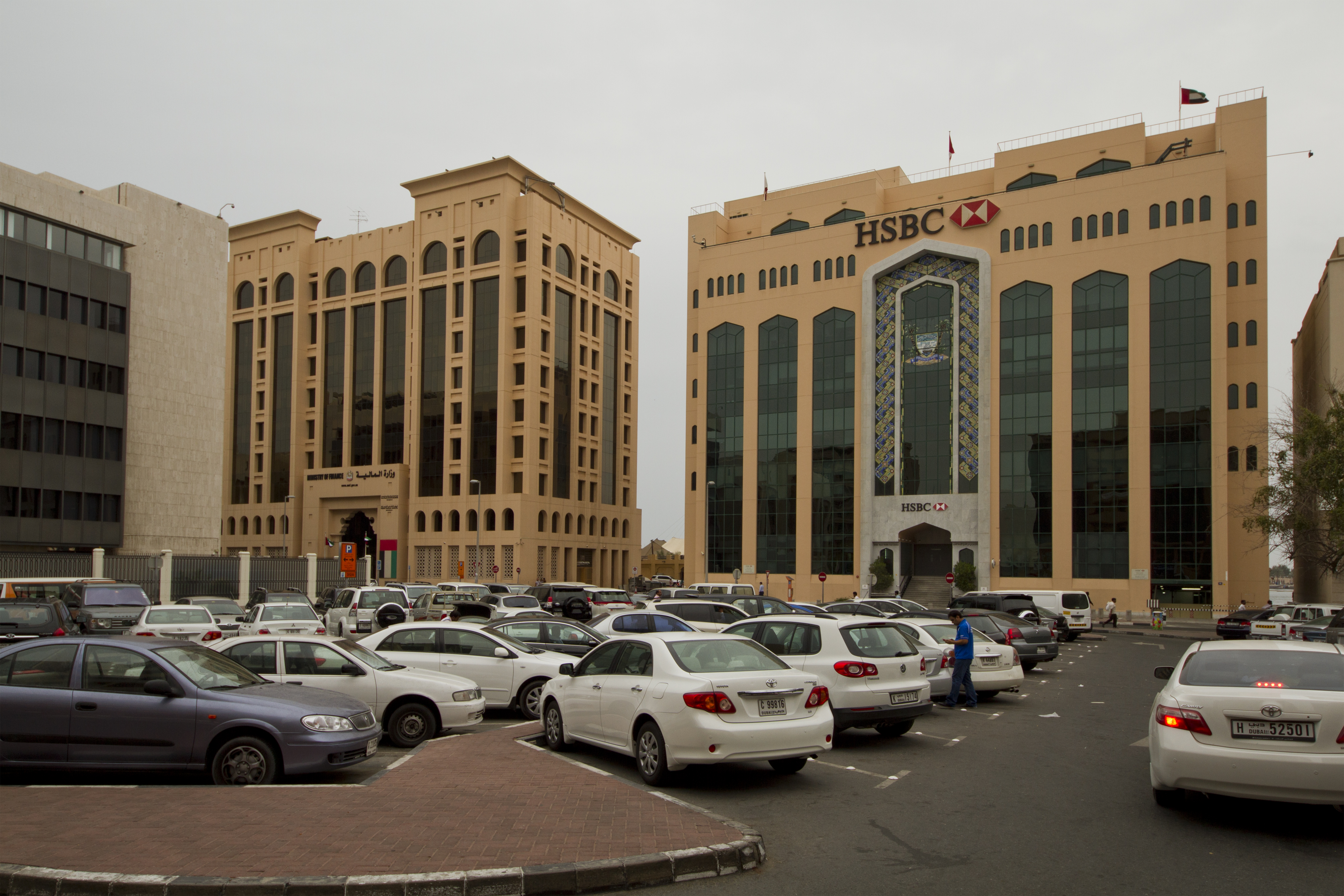
HSBC building in Bur Dubai

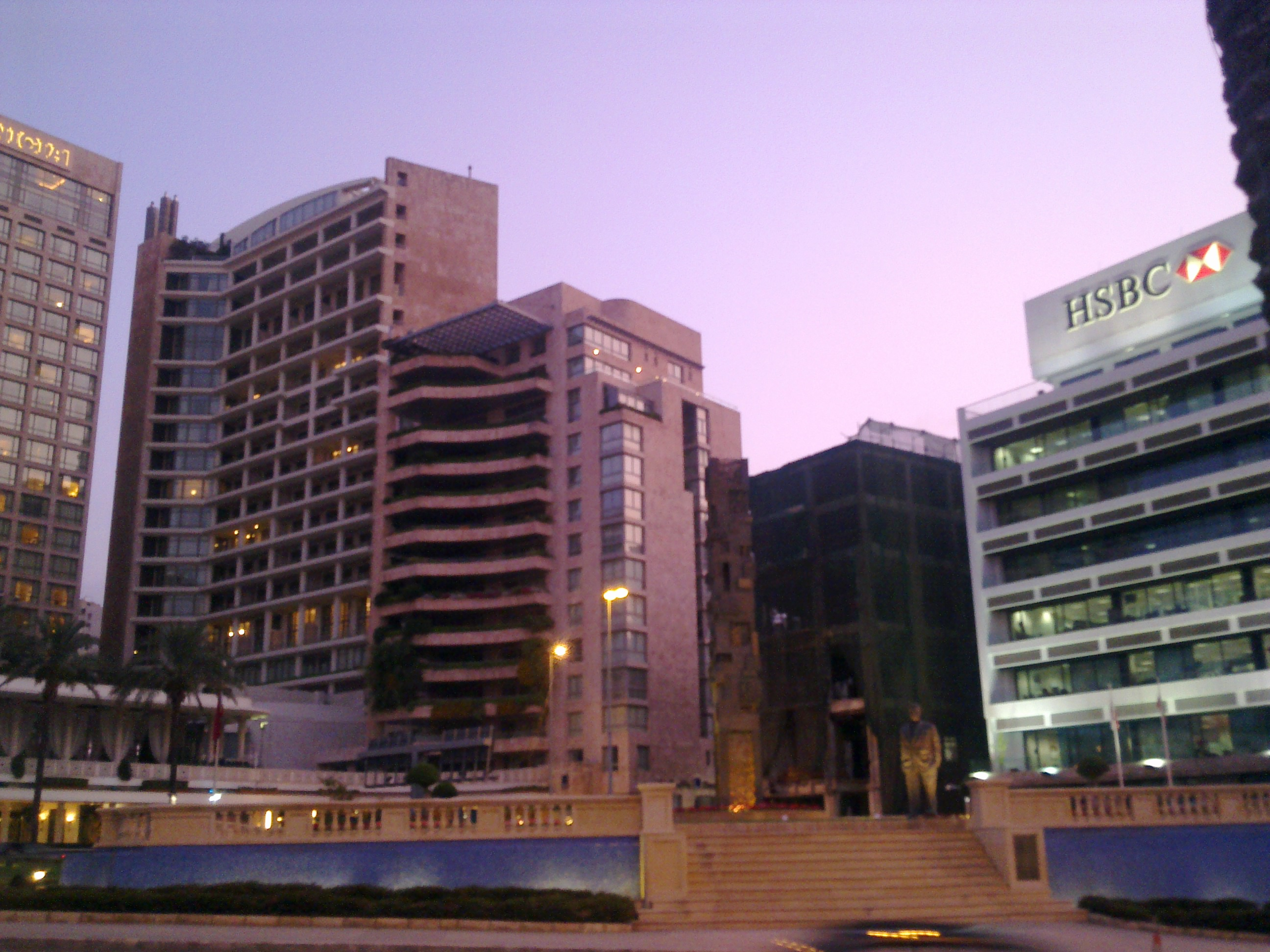
HSBC building in Beirut (right)

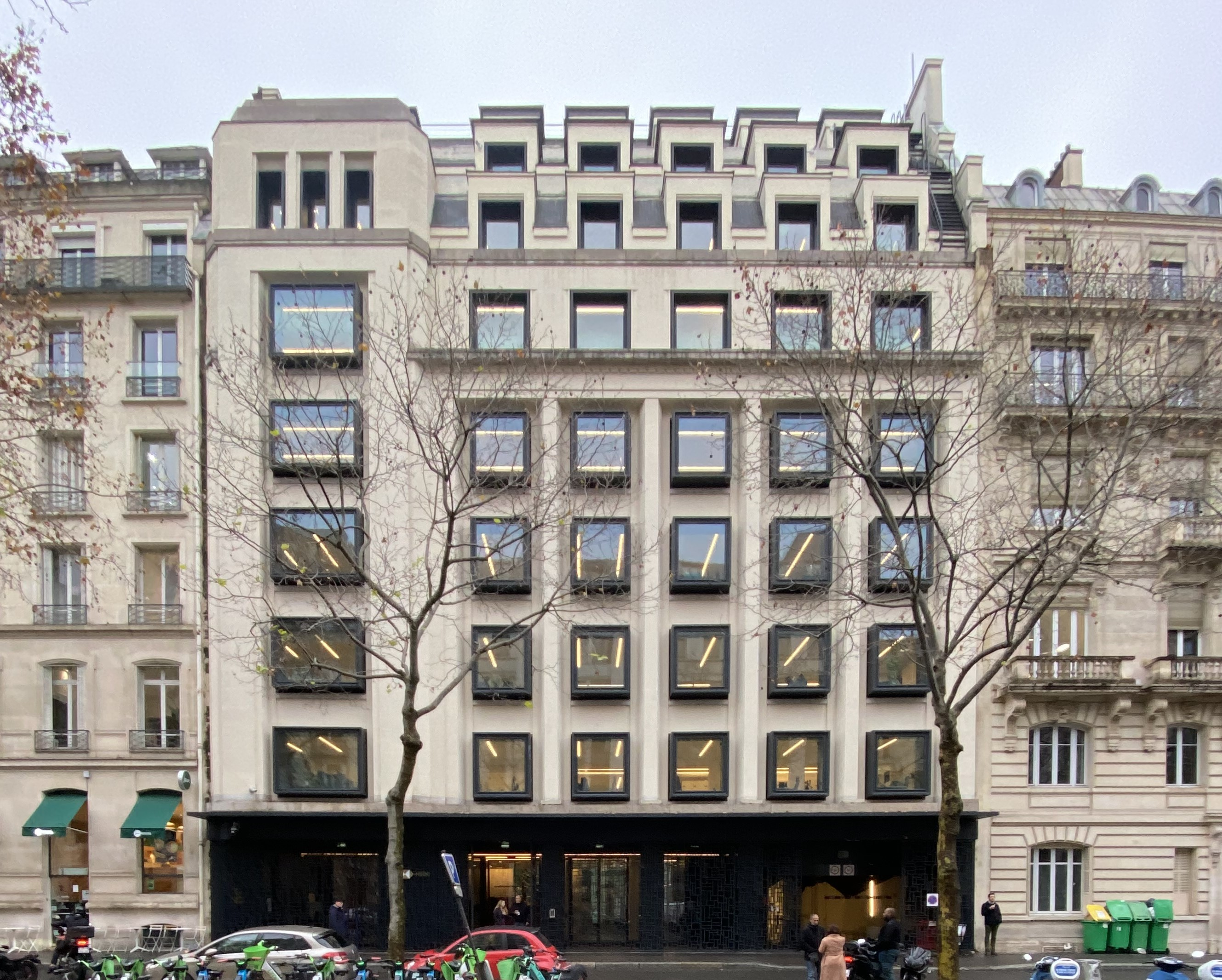
Building at 38, avenue Kléber in Paris, head office of HSBC Continental Europe

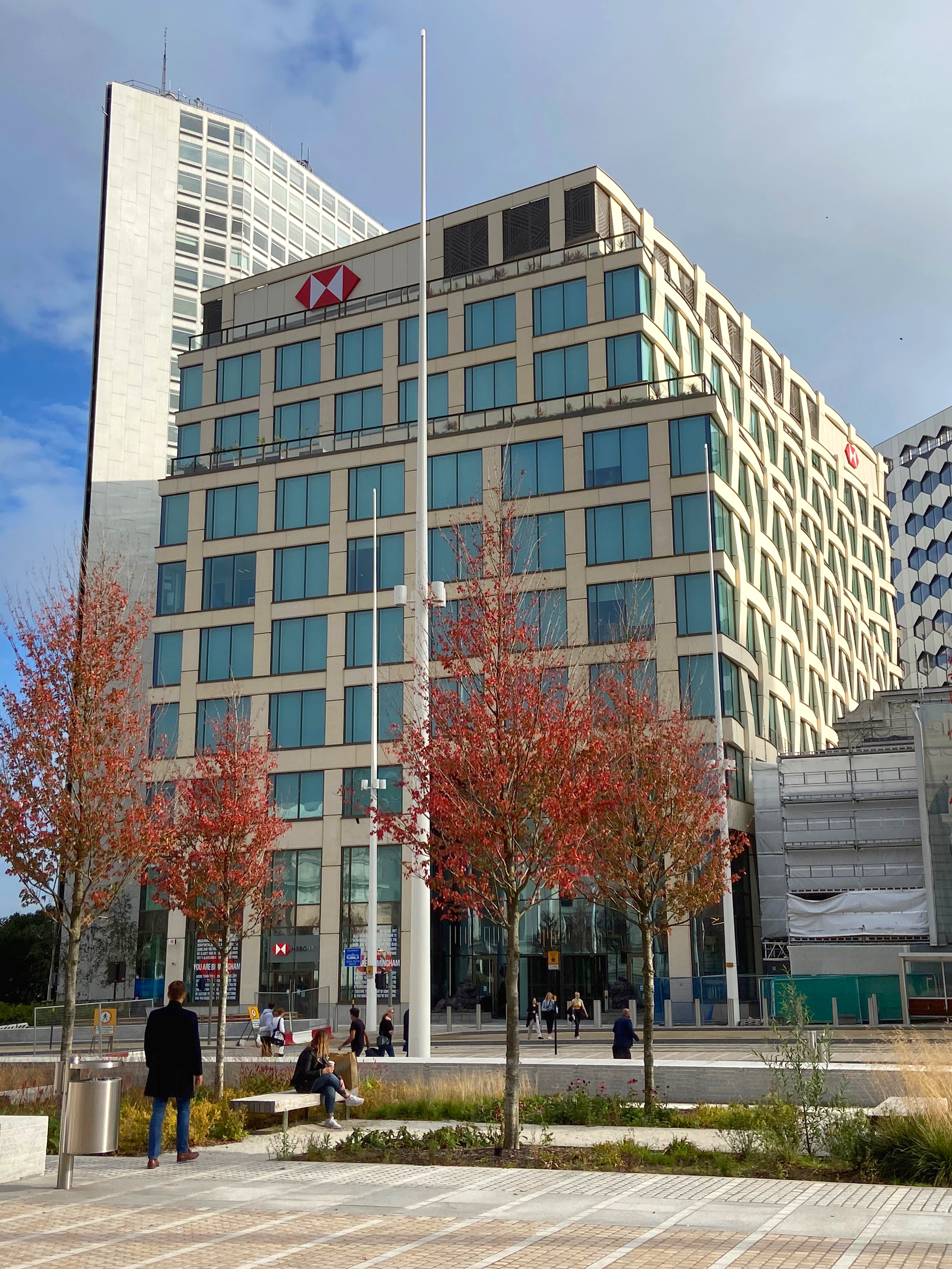
Building at One Centenary Square in Birmingham, head office of HSBC UK since 2018

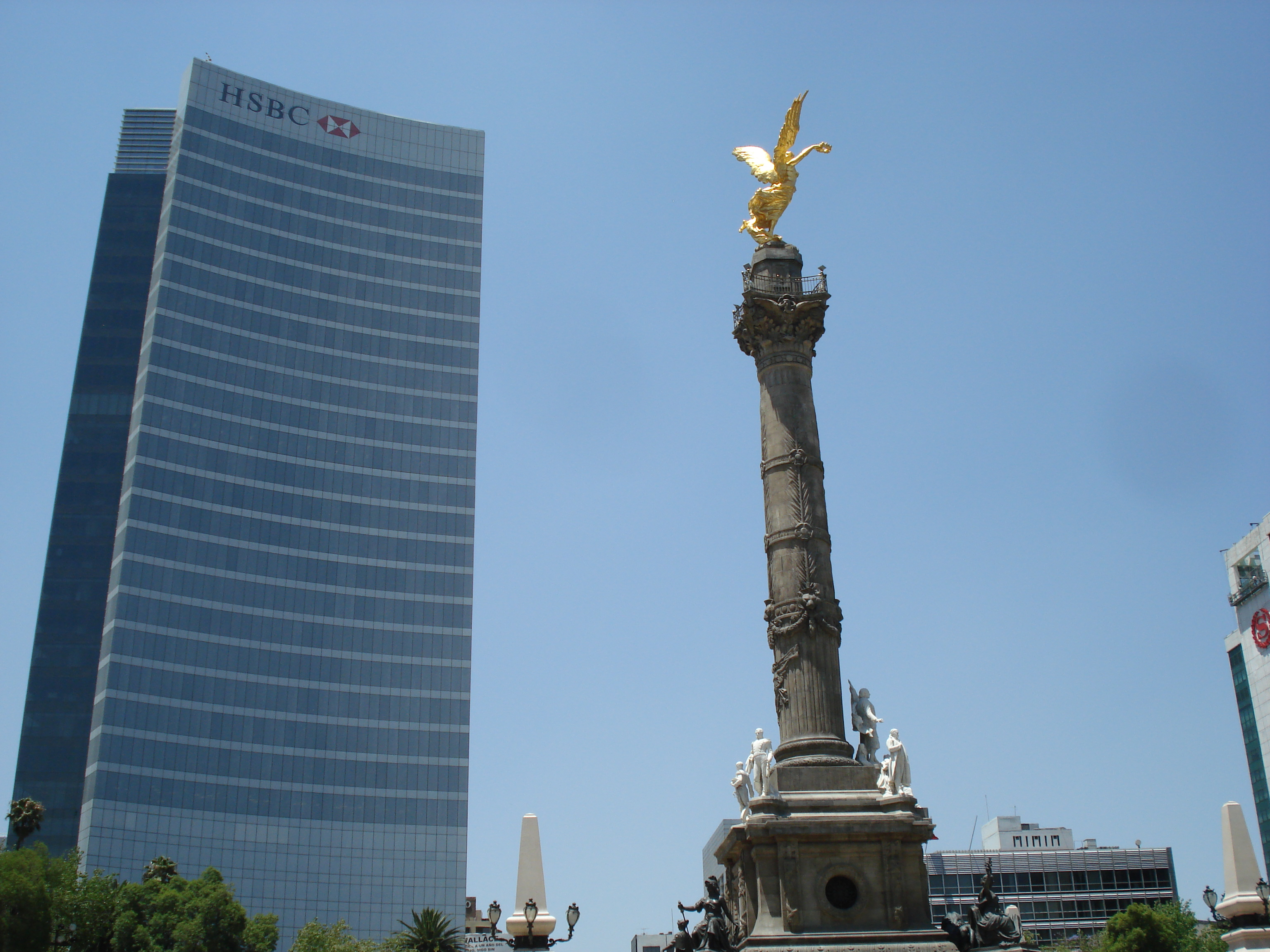
HSBC Tower, Mexico City facing the Angel of Independence

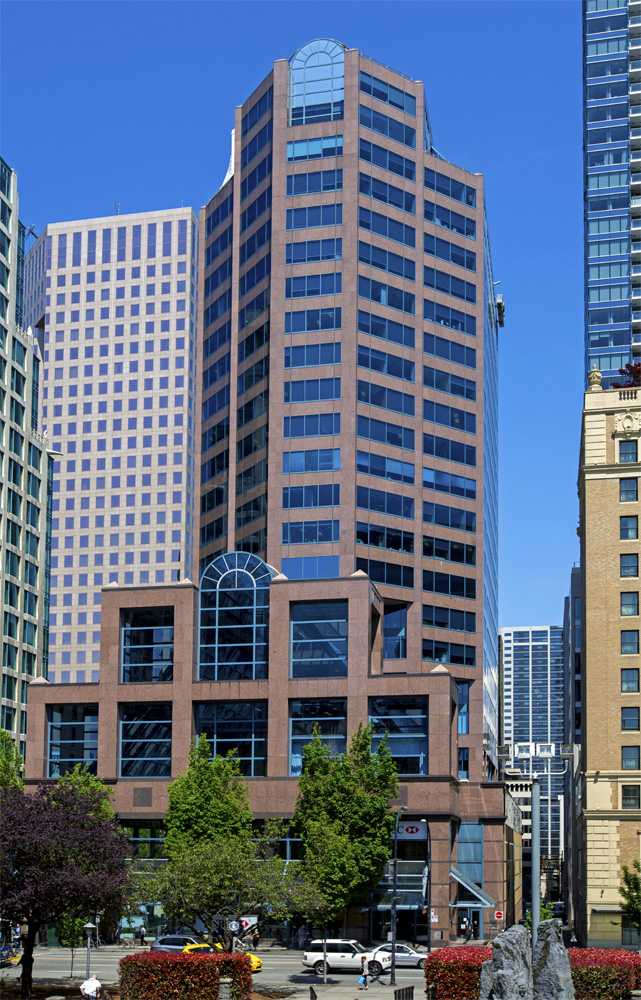
Former HSBC Canada Building in Vancouver

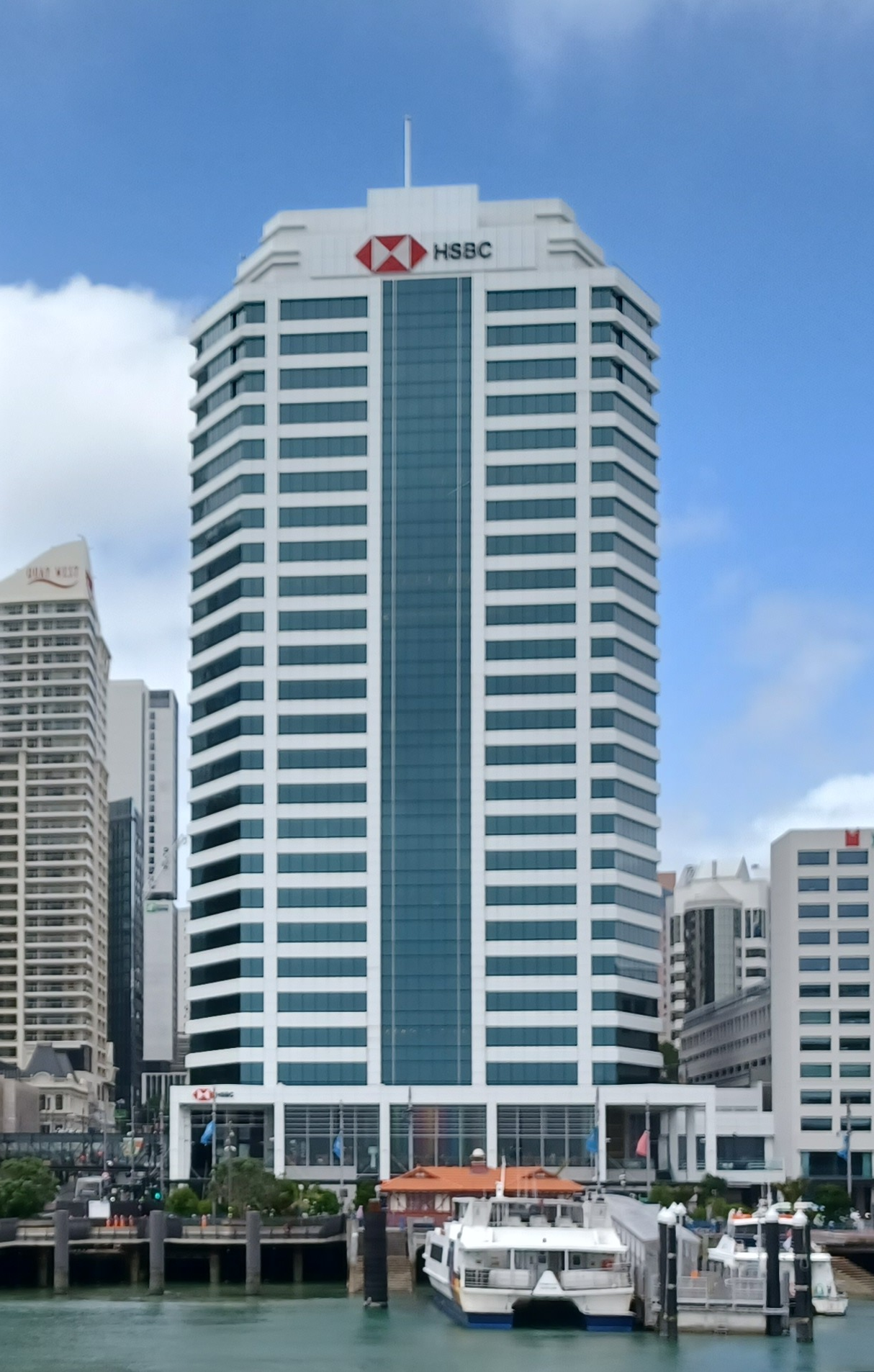
HSBC tower in Auckland, New Zealand

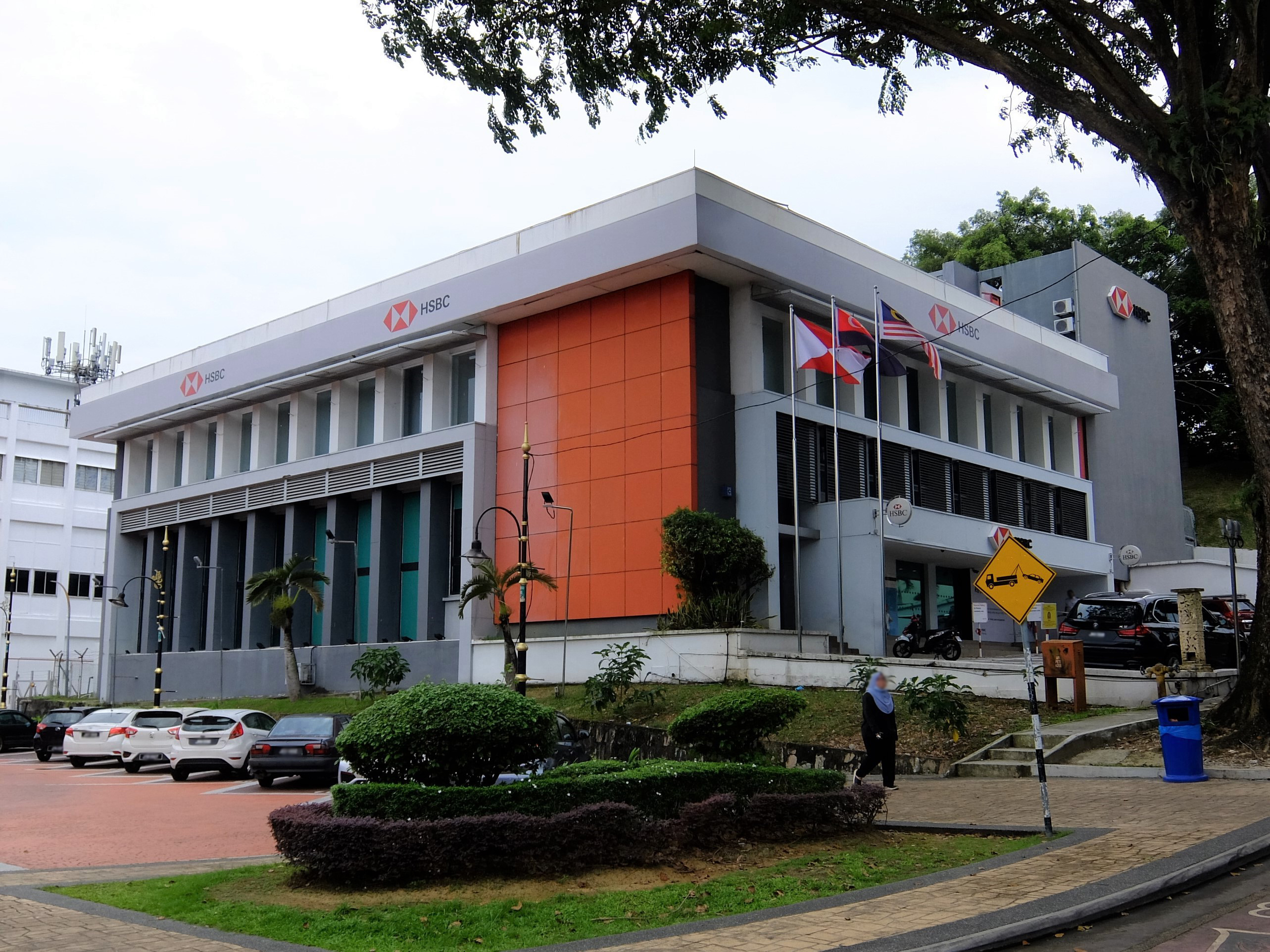
HSBC Building in Johor Bahru, Johor, Malaysia

HSBC has its world headquarters at 8 Canada Square in Canary Wharf, London. In June 2023, the bank announced its intentions to exit this building when its lease expires in 2027, stating their intention to move to a building in the City of London near St Paul's Cathedral.

HSBC's U.S. headquarters is located at The Spiral in Hudson Yards, a neighbourhood in Manhattan. Designed by M Moser Associates, it is a 260,000-square-foot, zero-carbon office space.

In 2025, the bank generated one-third of its revenue in the Hong Kong financial centre. 20.3 percent came from its operations in the United Kingdom, 7 percent from its US business, and 2.7 percent from France. The remainder (approximately 37 percent) came from other markets.

=== Size, profit and auditors ===
- As of 2014, according to Relsbank, HSBC was the fourth-largest bank in the world by assets (with $2,670.00 billion), the second largest in terms of revenues (with $146.50 billion) and the largest in terms of market value (with $180.81 billion).
- It was also the most profitable bank in the world with $19.13 billion in net income in 2007 (compared to Citigroup's $3.62 billion and Bank of America's $14.98 billion in the same period).
- In June 2006, The Economist stated that since the end of 2005 HSBC has been rated the largest banking group in the world by Tier 1 capital. In June 2014 The Banker ranked HSBC first in Western Europe and 5th in the world for Tier 1 capital.
- In February 2008, HSBC was named the world's most valuable banking brand by The Banker magazine.
- HSBC has been audited by PwC, one of the Big Four auditors since 2015.
- Despite being domiciled in the UK, HSBC generates around two-thirds of its profits in Asia, with China contributing 44% of the bank's profit in 2022.

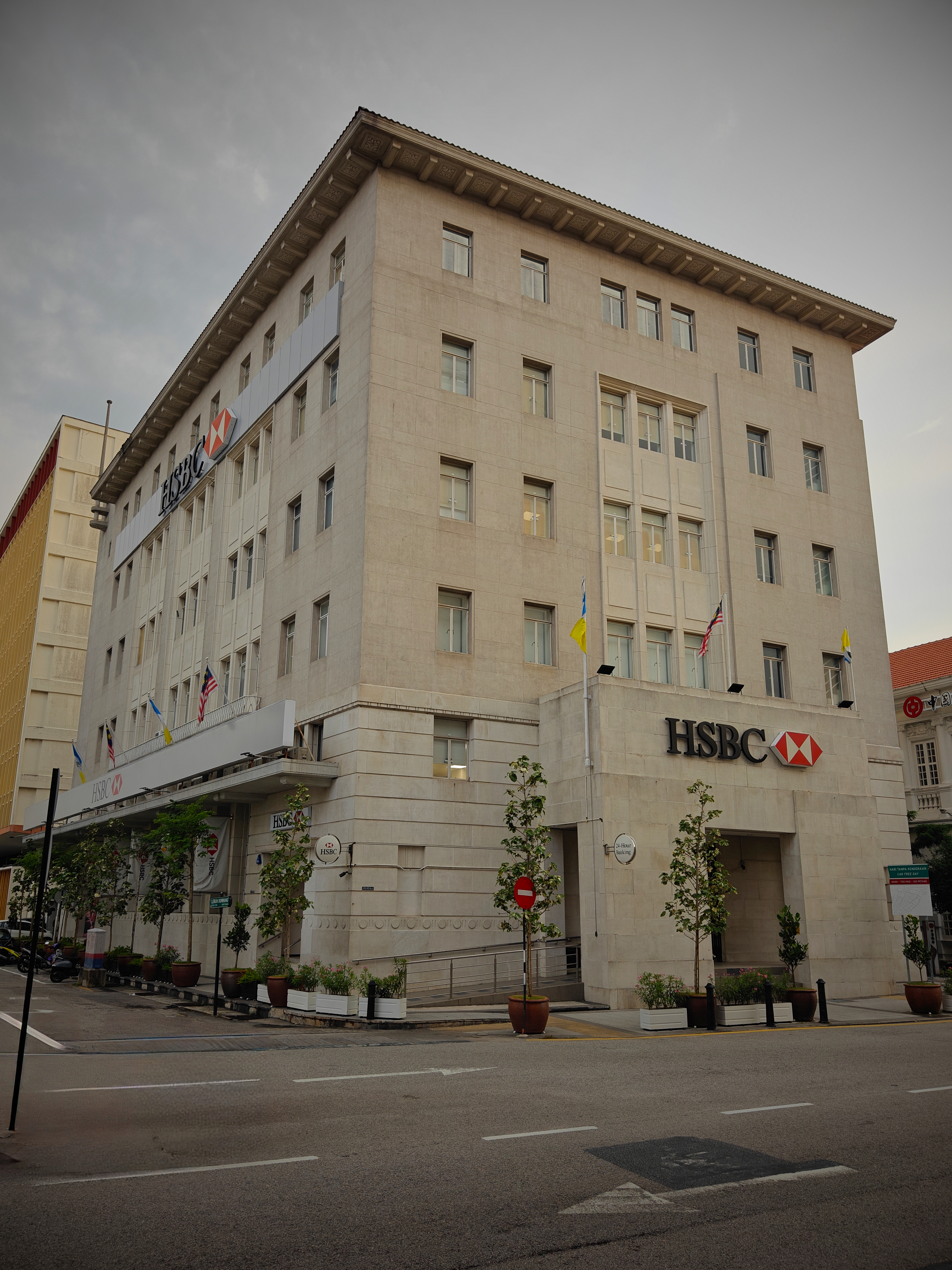
HSBC Building in George Town, Penang, Malaysia

=== Group service centres ===
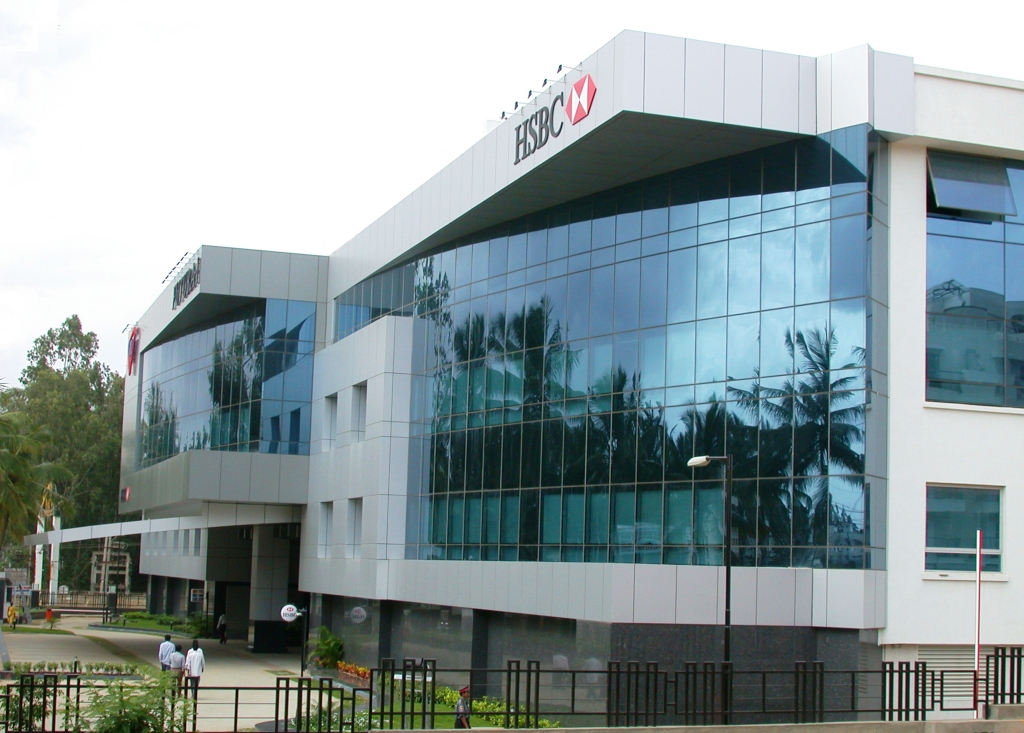
HSBC Data Processing Center in Bangalore, India

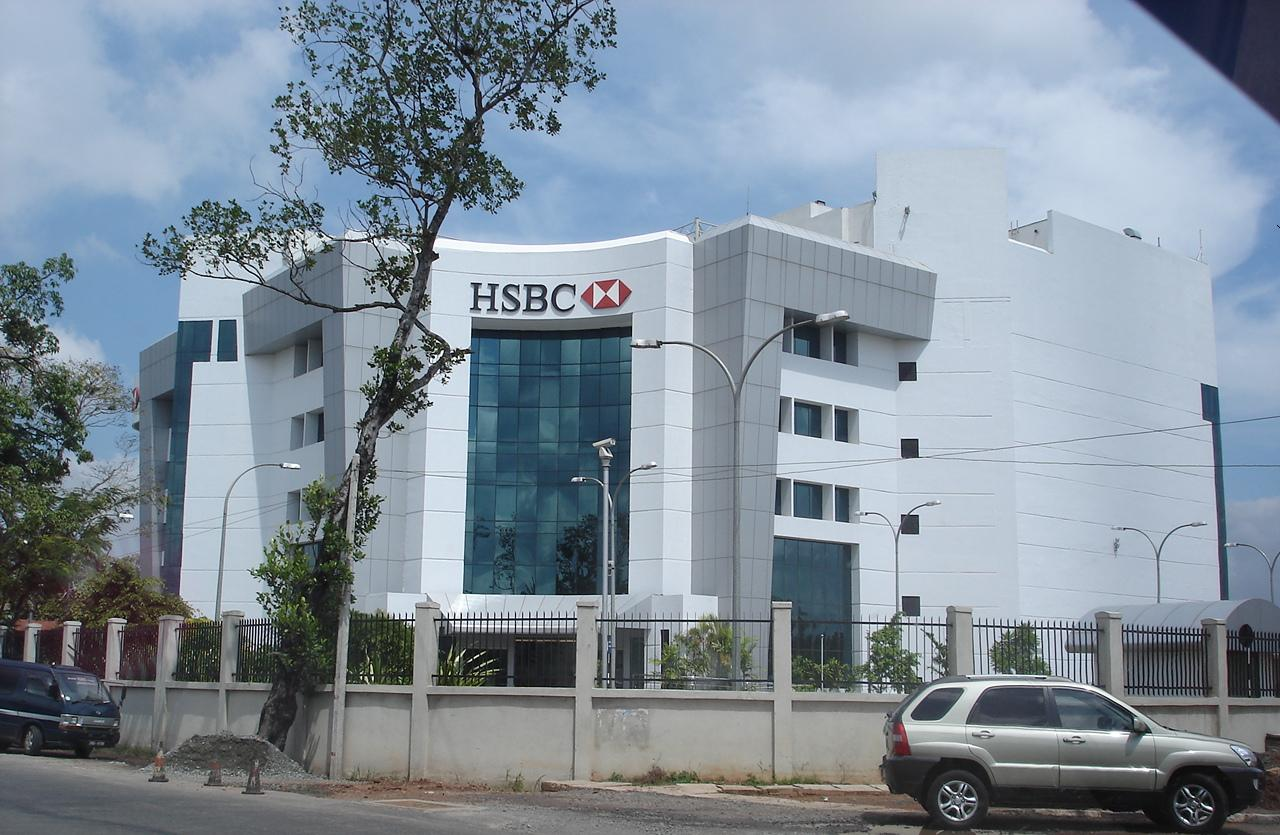
The HSBC Technology Center in Colombo, Sri Lanka

COO Alan Jebson said in March 2005 that he would be very surprised if fewer than 25,000 people were working in the centres over the next three years: "I don't have a precise target but I would be surprised if we had less than 15 (global service centers) in three years' time." He went on to say that each centre cost the bank from $20m to $30m to set up, but that for every job moved the bank saves about $20,000 (£10,400). Trades unions, particularly in the UK and US, blame these centres for job losses and also for the effective imposition of wage caps on their members.

=== Principal subsidiaries ===
The HSBC building in Manila, Philippines

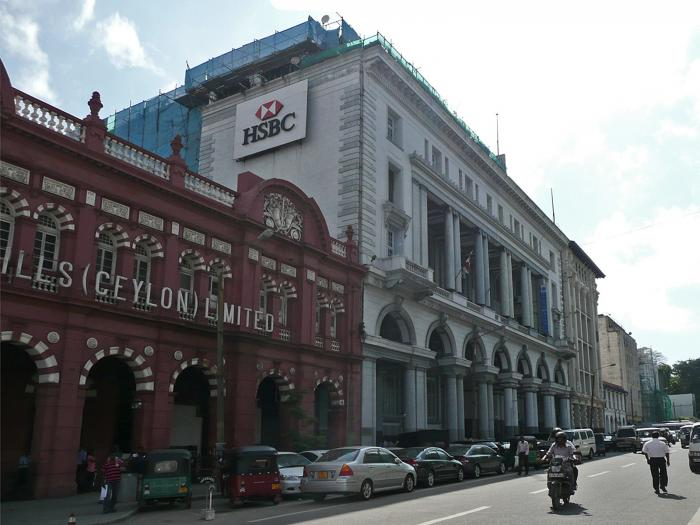
HSBC Bank in Colombo Fort, Sri Lanka

These are HSBC's subsidiaries worldwide:

Africa

- HSBC Mauritius (Only commercial banking)
- HSBC South Africa (Only commercial banking)

Asia-Pacific

- HSBC (Hong Kong)
  - Hang Seng Bank
    - Hang Seng Bank (China)
- HSBC Bank Australia
- HSBC Bangladesh (Only commercial banking) (HSBC withdrew consumer retail banking from Bangladesh in 2025)
- HSBC China
- HSBC Bank India
- HSBC Bank Indonesia
- HSBC Japan (Only commercial banking) (HSBC withdrew consumer retail banking from Japan in 2012)
- HSBC Korea (Only commercial banking) (HSBC withdrew consumer retail banking from South Korea in 2013)
- HSBC Bank Macau
- HSBC Bank Malaysia
- HSBC Maldives (Only commercial banking) (HSBC withdrew consumer retail banking from Maldives in 2016)
- HSBC New Zealand (Only commercial banking) (HSBC withdrew consumer retail banking from New Zealand in 2024)
- HSBC Bank Philippines
- HSBC Bank Singapore
- HSBC Sri Lanka (Only commercial banking) (HSBC withdrew consumer retail banking from Sri Lanka in 2026)
- HSBC Taiwan
- HSBC Thailand (Only commercial banking) (HSBC withdrew consumer retail banking from Thailand in 2012)
- HSBC Bank Vietnam

Europe

- HSBC Austria (Only Asset Management)
- HSBC Channel Islands and Isle of Man
- HSBC Continental Europe (Only commercial banking). Formed by:
  - HSBC Continental Europe, Belgium
  - HSBC Continental Europe, Czech Republic
  - HSBC Continental Europe, France
  - HSBC Continental Europe, Germany
  - HSBC Continental Europe, Ireland
  - HSBC Continental Europe, Italy
  - HSBC Continental Europe, Luxembourg
  - HSBC Continental Europe, Netherlands
  - HSBC Continental Europe, Poland
  - HSBC Continental Europe, Spain
  - HSBC Continental Europe, Sweden
- HSBC Denmark (Only Asset Management)
- HSBC Finland (Only Asset Management)
- HSBC Greece (Only Asset Management) (HSBC withdrew consumer retail banking from Greece in 2023)
- HSBC Bank Malta
- HSBC Norway (Only Asset Management)
- HSBC Portugal (Only Asset Management)
- HSBC Switzerland
- HSBC UK Bank plc

The Americas

- HSBC Bank Bermuda
- HSBC Brazil (Only commercial banking) (HSBC withdrew consumer retail banking from Brazil in 2016)
- HSBC Institutional Trust Services (British Virgin Islands)
- HSBC Cayman Services (Cayman Islands) (HSBC withdrew consumer retail banking from the Cayman Islands in 2014)
- HSBC Bank Chile (Only commercial banking)
- HSBC Colombia (HSBC withdrew consumer retail banking from Colombia in 2012)
- HSBC Peru (HSBC withdrew consumer retail banking from Peru in 2012)
- HSBC México
- HSBC Bank USA
  - HSBC Securities (USA) Inc.

Middle East

- HSBC Bank Egypt
- HSBC Israel (Only commercial banking)
- HSBC Lebanon (Only commercial banking) (HSBC withdrew consumer retail banking from Lebanon in 2016)
- HSBC Bank Middle East. Formed by:
  - HSBC Bank Middle East Limited Algeria Branch (Only commercial banking)
  - HSBC Bank Middle East Limited Bahrain Branch
  - HSBC Bank Middle East Limited Kuwait Branch (Only commercial banking)
  - HSBC Bank Middle East Limited Oman Branch (Only commercial banking) (HSBC withdrew consumer retail banking from Oman in 2023)
  - HSBC Bank Middle East Limited Qatar Branch
  - HSBC Bank Middle East Limited UAE Branch
- Saudi Awwal Bank
  - HSBC Saudi Arabia
- HSBC Bank (Turkey)

==== Specialized Ventures ====
- HSBC Finance is the non-banking financial services arm that focuses on credit card networking and consumer finance.
- HSBC Insurance (Asia Pacific) is the insurance arm.
- HSBC Private Bank is the private banking arm.
- HSBC Expat is the offshore banking arm that focuses on providing finance and cross border services to expatriates and migrants.

==== Global Reorganization ====
HSBC ceased retail banking operations in Thailand and Japan in 2012, South Korea in 2013, Brazil and Maldives in 2016, Oman in 2023, New Zealand, Mauritius and France in 2024, Bangladesh in 2025, and Sri Lanka in 2026.

HSBC sold its businesses in Zimbabwe in 2000, Costa Rica, El Salvador, Honduras, Colombia, Peru, Uruguay, Paraguay and Hungary in 2012, Panama and Guatemala in 2013, Kazakhstan, Pakistan, Jordan, Libya, Cook Islands and Cayman Islands in 2014, Monaco and Lebanon in 2016, Greece in 2023, Canada, Argentina, Russia and Armenia in 2024, and Uruguay in 2025.

HSBC ceased banking operations in Azerbaijan, Guam and the Northern Mariana Islands in 2002, Iran in 2007, Nicaragua in 2009, Georgia in 2011, Slovakia in 2012, Kenya in 2014, Palestine in 2015, Brunei in 2016, and Nigeria in 2018.

HSBC disposed of its 70.1% stake in the Dar Es Salaam Investment Bank, a bank based in Iraq, in 2013.

HSBC Bank (Turkey) transferred its operations in the Turkish Republic of Northern Cyprus to ALBANK in 2017.

HSBC previously had banking presence in Angola, Côte d'Ivoire, Fiji, Ghana, Morocco, Mozambique, Myanmar, Namibia, Uganda, Vanuatu, Venezuela and Zambia.

As of 2019, HSBC stopped offering Amanah (a retail banking product and service in compliance with the Islamic Sharia laws) in Bahrain, Bangladesh, Indonesia, Singapore and the UAE following a strategic review of its global Islamic Finance businesses, while the bank continues on offering the same Sharia compliant products and services in Malaysia and in Saudi Arabia.

== Controversies ==
HSBC has been implicated in a number of controversies and the bank has been repeatedly fined for money laundering (sometimes in relation to major criminal organizations such as the Sinaloa cartel).

=== Money laundering ===
In both 2003 and 2010, U.S. regulators ordered HSBC to strengthen its anti-money laundering practices. In October 2010, the United States OCC issued a Cease and Desist Order requiring HSBC to strengthen multiple aspects of its Anti-Money Laundering (AML) program. The identified problems included a once massive backlog of over 17,000 alerts identifying suspicious activity, failure to file timely suspicious activity reports with U.S. law enforcement, failure to conduct any due diligence to assess risks to HSBC affiliates before opening correspondent accounts for them, a three-year failure by HBUS from mid-2006 to mid-2009 to conduct any AML of $15 billion in bulk cash transactions from those same HSBC affiliates, failure to monitor $60 trillion in annual wire transfers by customers in countries rated lower risk by HBUS, and inadequate and unqualified AML staffing, resources, and leadership. It was noted that HSBC fully cooperated with the Senate investigation.

In 2012, HSBC was fined by $14 million by Argentina for failure to report suspicious transactions in the country in 2008.

On 19 July 2012, India investigated alleged violation of safety compliance, in which Indian employees were believed to be involved. On 9 November 2012, Indian activist and politician Arvind Kejriwal said he had details of 700 Indian bank accounts hiding black money with a total value of ₹60 billion (US$620 million) with HSBC in Geneva. In June 2013, a media outlet in India did an undercover expose where HSBC officers were caught on camera agreeing to launder "black money." HSBC placed these employees on leave pending their own internal investigation.

In November 2012, it was reported that HSBC had set up offshore accounts in Jersey for suspected drug-dealers and other criminals, and that HM Revenue and Customs had launched an investigation following a whistle blower leaking details of £700 million allegedly held in HSBC accounts in the Crown dependency.

Following search warrants and raids beginning in January 2013, in mid-March 2013 Argentina's main taxing authority accused HSBC of using fake receipts and dummy accounts to facilitate money laundering and tax evasion.

In early February 2013, appearing before UK's Parliamentary Banking Standards Commission, CEO Stuart Gulliver acknowledged that the structure of the bank had been "not fit for purpose." He also stated, "Matters that should have been shared and escalated were not shared and escalated." HSBC has also been accused of laundering money for terrorist groups.

In June 2015, HSBC was fined by the Geneva authorities after an investigation into money laundering within its Swiss subsidiary. The fine was 40 million Swiss Francs.

In 2018, HSBC was fined 15 million rand by South Africa's central bank for weaknesses in its processes meant to detect money laundering and terrorism financing, though it also added that HSBC was not found to have facilitated any transactions involving money laundering or the financing of terrorism in South Africa.

In 2020, HSBC told AUSTRAC that it may have broken Australia's anti money laundering and counter-terrorism laws after allegedly failing to report thousands of transactions to AUSTRAC.

In July 2021, HSBC disclosed that in 2016 it discovered a suspected money laundering network that received $4.2 billion worth of payments which has raised questions over whether it disclosed this appropriately to US monitors as the bank was still under probation by U.S. authorities over anti-money laundering concerns.

In December 2021, HSBC was fined 64 million pounds ($85 million) by British regulators for failings in its anti-money laundering processes spanning eight years.

==== US Senate investigation (2012) ====
In July 2012, a US Senate committee issued a report which stated that HSBC had been in breach of money-laundering rules, and had assisted Iran and North Korea to circumvent US nuclear-weapons sanctions.

In December 2012, Assistant U.S. Attorney General Lanny Breuer suggested that the U.S. government might resist criminal prosecution of HSBC which could lead to the loss of the bank's U.S. charter. He stated, "Our goal here is not to bring HSBC down, it's not to cause a systemic effect on the economy, it's not for people to lose thousands of jobs."

In December 2012, HSBC was penalised $1.9 billion (US), the largest fine under the Bank Secrecy Act, for violating four U.S. laws designed to protect the U.S. financial system. HSBC had allegedly laundered at least $881 million in drugs proceeds through the U.S. financial system for international cartels, as well as processing an additional $660 million for banks in US sanctioned countries. According to the report, "The U.S. bank subsidiary [also] failed to monitor more than $670 billion in wire transfers and more than $9.4 billion in purchases of physical dollars from its Mexico unit." As part of the agreement deferring its prosecution, HSBC acknowledged that for years it had ignored warning signs that drug cartels in Mexico were using its branches to launder millions of dollars, and also acknowledged that HSBC's international staff had stripped identifying information on transactions made through the United States from countries facing economic sanctions such as Iran and Sudan.

A December 2012 CNNMoney article compared the 1.9 billion dollar fine to HSBC's profit "last year" (2011) of 16.8 billion.

In 2016, HSBC was sued by American families involved in deaths by organized-crime gangs for processing funds ("money laundering") for the Sinaloa cartel.

==== FinCEN Files (2020) ====
The FinCEN Files showed that HSBC continued to serve alleged criminals and corporations involved in government corruption, including $292 million for the Waked Family company Viva Panama between 2010 and 2016 before the United States Department of the Treasury declared it a drug money-laundering organization. HSBC's activities took place while the bank was under probation from the U.S. government; six former HSBC employees reported to the International Consortium of Investigative Journalists that the deferred prosecution agreement for HSBC marked a "cultural shift" in the organization toward profit-making motives. Employees working in compliance at HSBC also expressed concern to Buzzfeed about what they felt were inadequate efforts to combat money laundering, including hasty investigations and unachievable internal investigation quotas. In response to the report HSBC said it is "continually seeking ways to improve" its financial crime compliance regime.

=== Forex, Libor and Euribor scandals (2014) ===
The bank was fined US$275m by the US CFTC in 2014 for taking part in the Forex scandal. The bank also settled for US$18m in the related Libor scandal and EUR 33m for the Euribor rate scandal (relative to other banks a small amount). In October 2020 HSBC was fined about $2.2 million over the Euribor rate scandal in Switzerland.

=== Belgian tax fraud, money laundering charges (2014) ===
In November 2014, HSBC was accused of tax fraud and money laundering by Belgian Prosecutors for helping hundreds of clients move money into offshore tax havens.

In August 2019, HSBC agreed to pay $336 million to settle the case.

=== Tax avoidance schemes (2015) ===
In February 2015, the International Consortium of Investigative Journalists released information about the bank's business conduct under the title Swiss Leaks. The ICIJ alleges that the bank profited from doing business with tax evaders and other clients. The BBC reported that the bank had put pressure on media not to report about the controversy, with British newspaper The Guardian claiming bank advertising had been put "on pause" after The Guardian's coverage of the matter. Peter Oborne, chief political commentator at The Daily Telegraph, resigned from the paper and in an open letter claimed the newspaper suppressed negative stories and dropped investigations into HSBC because of the bank's advertising.

In November 2017, HSBC agreed to pay $352 million to settle a French investigation into the case.

In August 2019, the former head of HSBC Swiss from 2000 to 2008, Peter Braunwalder pleaded guilty in a French court for helping wealthy clients hide $1.8 billion. He was fined $560,000 and received a one-year suspended jail sentence.

In December 2019, HSBC Swiss agreed to pay a $192 million United States fine for the case.

=== $3.5 billion currency scheme (2016) ===
In July 2016, the United States Department of Justice charged two executives from HSBC Bank over an alleged $3.5 billion currency scheme which defrauded HSBC clients and "manipulated the foreign exchange market to benefit themselves and their bank". "Mark Johnson and Stuart Scott, both British citizens, are being accused." "Johnson was arrested late Tuesday [19 July 2016] at JFK International Airport in New York City." "Stuart Scott, who was HSBC's European head of foreign exchange trading in London until December 2014, is accused of the same crimes." A warrant was issued for Scott's arrest, but he fled to Britain. In July 2018 the High Court of Justice ruled against extraditing him to the United States since most of the alleged crimes took place in Britain and because Scott has no significant connection to the United States.

Mark Johnson was later convicted of nine counts of wire fraud and conspiracy to defraud related to front running the currency trades of HSBC clients and sentenced to two years in federal prison. He was released after serving three months in prison and was allowed to return home to the U.K. while he pursued an appeal. November 2020 the U.S. Supreme Court declined to hear an appeal of his 2017 conviction, which was previously upheld by the United States Court of Appeals for the Second Circuit. It meant he would have to return to the U.S. to serve his sentence. In February 2021 a judge ruled that Johnson would not need to report to prison until he is vaccinated against COVID-19. In January 2018 HSBC agreed to pay a $101.5 million fine over the case.

=== Housing crisis fine (2018) ===
In 2018, HSBC agreed to pay a $765 million fine to settle claims it mis-sold Residential mortgage-backed securities between 2005 and 2007. Forbes noted the settlement was the lowest of 11 banks that settled with the Department of Justice. HSBC has said in a statement that it has been improving relevant control mechanisms since the financial crisis.

=== Support for China's Security Law for Hong Kong (2020) ===
In June 2020, on the eve of the anniversary of the 1989 Tiananmen Square protests and massacre, HSBC took the rare step of wading into political issues by publicly backing Beijing's controversial new national security law for Hong Kong. The chief executive for HSBC's Asia-Pacific division, Peter Wong, signed a petition supporting the law and stated in a post on Chinese social media that HSBC "respects and supports all laws that stabilise Hong Kong's social order."

Though HSBC moved its headquarters to London in 1993, Hong Kong remains its largest market accounting for 54% of its profit, a third of its global revenue, and 50,000 local staff. In response, Joshua Wong, a top Hong Kong pro-democracy activist decried the bank's position stating that HSBC's stance demonstrates "how China will use the national security law as new leverage for more political influence over foreign business community in this global city." Alistair Carmichael, the U.K. chairman of the All Parliamentary Group on Hong Kong, said HSBC made a serious error by bending to China's will regarding the security law, calling it "a colossal misjudgment" since it would be seen as a large British corporation advocating for "a fairly flagrant breach of international law" when banks rely on a rules-based system. Human Rights Watch alleged that "the new national security law will deal the most severe blow to the rights of people in Hong Kong since the territory's transfer to China in 1997."

British Foreign Secretary Dominic Raab also commented on HSBC's stance, saying "Businesses will make their own judgment calls, but let me just put it this way – we will not sacrifice the people of Hong Kong over the altar of banker bonuses".

Since August 2020, HSBC has frozen the accounts of numerous pro-democratic organizations and activists, and their families, including Jimmy Lai, Ted Hui and the Good Neighbour North District Church.

In January 2021, the CEO of HSBC defended its relationship with Chinese authorities in Hong Kong and freezing of Ted Hui's account to the United Kingdom's parliamentary foreign affairs committee.

In February 2021, more than 50 members of the Inter-Parliamentary Alliance on China called for the immediate unfreezing of funds belonging to Ted Hui and his family,

In 2023 an All-party parliamentary group released a report regarding the actions of the bank's operations in Hong Kong. The report found that HSBC was complicit in human rights abuses by bank's cutting off the pension plan after the Hong Kong authority cut off pension funding for those that fled the anti-democratic crackdown on the region. The group was chaired by Alistair Carmichael who stated that the bank has been "complicit in the repression of the human rights of innocent Hong Kongers".

=== Sterling Lads (2021) ===
EU antitrust regulators fined HSBC 174.3 million euros for foreign exchange market rigging by exchanging sensitive information and trading plans through an online chat room dubbed "Sterling Lads".

=== Other ===
==== Data loss (2008) ====
In 2008, HSBC issued a statement confirming it had lost a disc containing details of 370,000 customers of its life insurance business. HSBC said the disc had failed to arrive in the post between offices and it was not encrypted. The bank was later fined over £3 million by the Financial Services Authority for failing to exercise reasonable care with regards to data protection in connection with this and other lost customer information.

==== Breaching Iran sanctions for Huawei (2009–2014) ====
From 2009 to 2014, in breach of United States sanctions on Iran, the bank facilitated money transfers in Iran on behalf of the Chinese company Huawei.

==== Gaddafi Libya claims (2011) ====
According to Global Witness and cited by BBC, "billions of dollars of assets" were held by the bank for the Libyan Investment Authority, controlled by Colonel Muammar Gaddafi. Following Gaddafi's overthrow the bank declined to reveal information about the funds citing customer confidentiality.

==== Deforestation claims (2012, 2018) ====
In the report titled "In the Future There Will Be No Forests Left" produced by Global Witness, the bank was accused of supporting the seven largest Malaysian timber conglomerates, which are responsible for deforestation in the Malaysian state of Sarawak. The bank declined to divulge its clients, citing client confidentiality, but maintains that the accusations are not accurate. The environmentalist group Greenpeace has also alleged that the bank is contributing to the deforestation in Indonesia and subsequent hazardous impacts in the region by providing funds to palm oil producers for new plantations. The bank has denied these claims, citing its sustainability policy that prohibits the bank from financing projects that "damage high conservation value forest."

==== Money-laundering policies (2014) ====
The bank was reported to have refused large cash withdrawals for customers without a third-party letter confirming what the money would be used for. Douglas Carswell, the Conservative MP for Clacton, was alarmed by the policy: "All these regulations which have been imposed on banks allow enormous interpretation. It basically infantilises the customer. In a sense, your money becomes pocket money and the bank becomes your parent."

==== Racism report (2021) ====
HSBC banker Ian Clarke alleged a failure of HSBC to retain or promote black and other ethnic minority staff, a lack of such people in senior positions, and insufficient policies to address these problems. HSBC did not address the specifics of Clarke's assertions and he resigned shortly thereafter.

==== Climate change (2022) ====
Stuart Kirk, the bank's global head of responsible investing, was suspended in May due to his speech in which he said "There's always some nut job telling me about the end of the world." He quit his position in July, criticising the "cancel culture" in his Linkedin post, and blaming it for his suspension and resignation. In October, the company had its two advertisements banned due to being misleading about the company's activities for reducing the effects of climate change. The Advertising Standards Authority (ASA), who was behind the ban, stated that the posters omitted material information about how HSBC planned to tackle the climate change and reduce its impact.

== Sponsorships ==
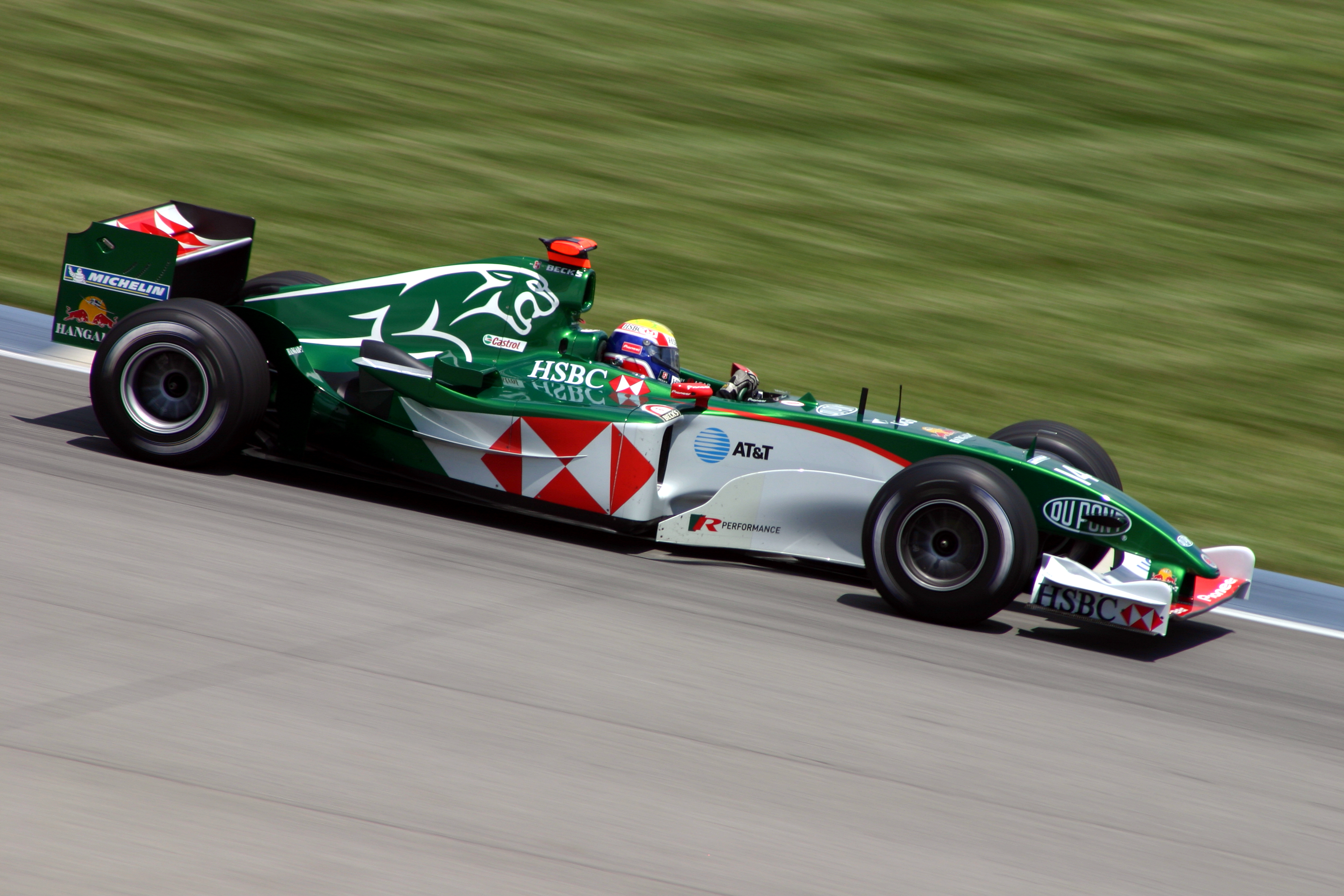
The 2004 Jaguar Racing Formula One car, being driven by Mark Webber

Having sponsored the Jaguar Racing Formula One team since the days of Stewart Grand Prix, HSBC ended its relationship with motorsport after seven years when Red Bull purchased Jaguar Racing from Ford.

In the mid-2000s, HSBC switched its focus to golf, taking title sponsorship of several events such as the HSBC World Match Play Championship, HSBC Women's World Match Play Championship (now defunct), WGC-HSBC Champions, Abu Dhabi HSBC Golf Championship, HSBC Women's Champions, HSBC Golf Business Forum and HSBC Golf Roots (a youth development programme). HSBC was named the 'Official Banking Partner' of the Open Championship, in a five-year deal announced in 2010.

In October 2010, the International Rugby Board announced that they had concluded a 5-year deal with HSBC which granted them status as the first-ever title sponsor of the World Sevens Series. Through the accord, HSBC is paying more than $100 million for the title naming rights to all the tournaments. HSBC opted to sub-license the naming rights to all but one of the individual tournaments while retaining its name sponsorship of the overall series and the Hong Kong Sevens. The company also sponsors the Hong Kong Rugby Union and the New South Wales Waratahs team in Super Rugby. It sponsored British & Irish Lions during their 2009 tour to South Africa and 2013 tour to Australia.

HSBC is the official banking partner of the Wimbledon Championships tennis tournament, providing banking facilities on site and renaming the junior event as the HSBC Road to Wimbledon National 14 and Under Challenge.

HSBC's other sponsorships are mainly in the area of education, health and the environment. In November 2006, HSBC announced a $5 million partnership with SOS Children as part of Future First.

In 2022, it was announced that Zhou Guanyu, the first Chinese F1 driver in history who made his debut a few months earlier, became an ambassador for the Chinese subsidiary of HSBC.

From 1999 until 2011, HSBC's American division was the venue sponsor for the Buffalo Sabres of the National Hockey League (NHL), known as the HSBC Arena, which was renamed to FirstNiagara Center in 2011 after its divestiture of its upstate New York bank branches to Buffalo-based First Niagara Bank before becoming KeyBank Center in 2016 following KeyBank's merger with First Niagara.

== Ownership ==
Around 44% of HSBC shares are held by the general public and around 56% are held by institutions. The largest shareholders in early 2024 were:

- BlackRock (8.9%)
- Ping An Asset Management (8.82%)
- The Vanguard Group (4.75%)
- Norges Bank (2.87%)
- Legal & General (1.89%)
- State Street Global Advisors (1.66%)
- HSBC Asset Management (1.12%)
- UBS Asset Management AG (1.05%)
- HSBC Holdings General Employee Benefit Trust (0.9%)
- Schroder Investment Management (0.71%)
- Northern Trust Global Investments (0.68%)
- Aviva Investors (0.64%)
- Royal London Asset Management (0.61%)
- Amundi (0.54%)
- Abrdn Plc (0.53%)

== Financial indicators ==
	2016	2017	2018	2019	2020	2021	2022	2023	2024	2025
Total revenue (USD bn)	44.6	49.6	52.1	53.3	41.6	50.5	50.5	56.4	61.3	63.2
Net profit (USD bn)	3.5	10.8	13.7	7.4	5.2	13.9	16.0	23.5	24.0	22.3
Total Deposits (USD bn)	1,332	1,435	1,438	1,516	1,744	1,828	1,656	1,706	1,753	1,912
Total assets (USD bn)	2,375	2,522	2,558	2,715	2,984	2,958	2,967	3,039	3,017	3,233
Total equity (USD bn)	183	198	194	193	205	207	196	193	192	206
Full Time Employees	235,000	229,000	235,000	235,000	226,000	220,000	219,000	221,000	211,000	209,000
References										

== Leadership ==
- Group Chairman: Brendan Nelson (December 2025 to present)
- Group Chief Executive: Georges Elhedery (September 2024 to present)

=== List of former group chairmen ===
The position of Group Chairman was formed in 1991; the preceding position, Chairman of The Hongkong and Shanghai Banking Corporation, has remained a separate position.

1. Sir William Purves (1991–1998); concurrently Group Chief Executive from 1991 to 1993
2. Sir John Bond (1998–2006)
3. The Lord Green (2006–2010)
4. Sir Douglas Flint (2010–2017)
5. Sir Mark Tucker (2017–2025)

=== List of former group chief executives ===
The position of Group Chief Executive was formed in 1991; the preceding position, chief executive of The Hongkong and Shanghai Banking Corporation, has remained a separate position.

1. William Purves (1991–1993)
2. John Bond (1993–1998)
3. Keith Whitson (1998–2003)
4. Stephen Green (2003–2006)
5. Michael Geoghegan (2007–2010)
6. Stuart Gulliver (2011–2018)
7. John Flint (2018–2019)
8. Noel Quinn (2020–2024)

== See also ==
- HSBC lions
- List of banks in the United Kingdom
- List of buildings and structures in Hong Kong
- List of investors in Bernard L. Madoff Investment Securities
- Peking University HSBC Business School
- Primary dealer
- Too big to fail
