= HSBC Bank Chile =

HSBC Bank (Chile)
- Type: Subsidiary of HSBC Holdings plc
- Industry: Finance and Insurance
- Headquarters: Santiago, Chile, Santiago, Chile
- Key people: Alberto A Silva, CEO
- Products: Financial services
- Website: www.hsbc.cl/

HSBC Bank (Chile) is a subsidiary of HSBC. Presently, the bank is focusing on corporate banking and global Treasury.

== History ==
The HSBC Group has had a presence in Chile since 1981. By 1985 it had three branches, two in Santiago and one in Valparaíso. In 1993 HSBC sold its operations to Banco O'Higgins, which was owned by the Luksic Group. In 1997 a merger between Banco O'Higgins and Banco de Santiago created Banco Santiago, one of the largest local banks in Chile and one in which HSBC continues to have a 7% shareholding. The acquisition of the former Republic National Bank of New York returned HSBC to Chile through two full service branches of HSBC Bank USA, in addition to a domestic factoring business.
