= Banking hall =

Room in a bank

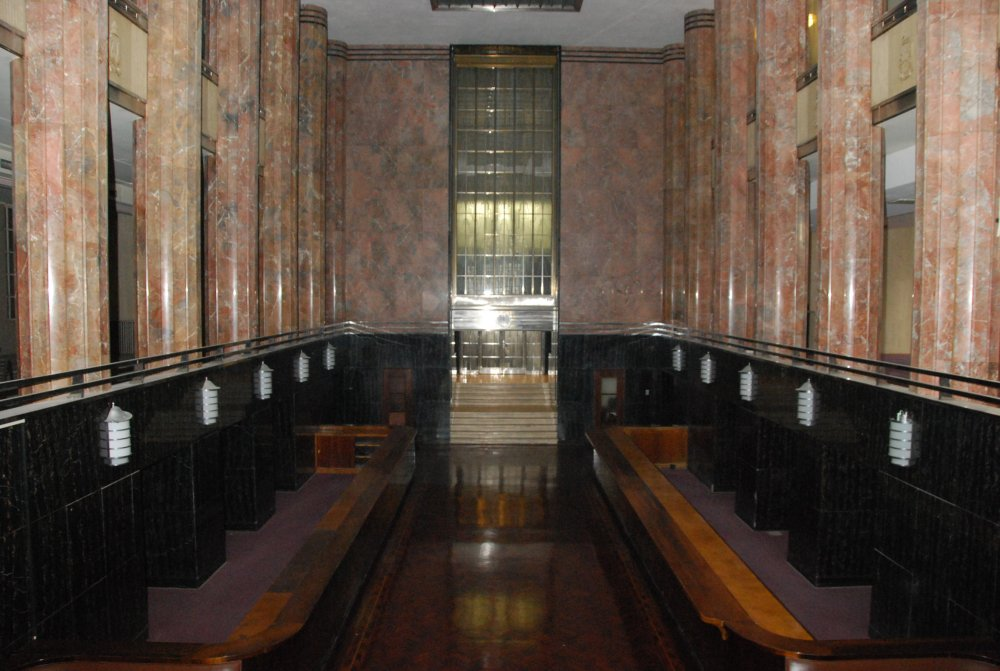
The banking hall at Mutual Building, Cape Town

A banking hall is traditionally the centre of banking activity in a bank where staff and customers meet surrounded by offices for managers and clerks. It has been described as the "shop floor" of a bank. Often built to an opulent standard, many banking halls are architecturally notable. In the twentieth century many banking halls were converted to retail or entertainment use due to their typically large size and central locations. The Counting House in Glasgow, for instance, which was built in the Victorian era and once owned by the Royal Bank of Scotland, is now a Wetherspoons pub.
