= HSBC Bank Taiwan =

HSBC Bank (Taiwan) Limited 滙豐(台灣)商業銀行股份有限公司
- Type: Subsidiary
- Industry: Finance and Insurance
- Founded: 2009
- Headquarters: Taipei, Taiwan
- Key people: Vincent Cheng (Chairman); Nicholas Winsor (CEO)
- Products: Financial services
- Parent: HSBC
- Website: hsbc.com.tw

HSBC Bank (Taiwan) Limited (Chinese: 滙豐(台灣)商業銀行股份有限公司) is a foreign bank incorporated locally in Taiwan since 2009. It is part of HSBC and is wholly owned by Hong Kong–based The Hongkong and Shanghai Banking Corporation Limited.

HSBC's presence in Taiwan dates back to 1885 when The Hongkong and Shanghai Banking Corporation appointed an agent. A full-service branch was established in Taipei in 1984.

Prior to the acquisition of the business and operations of The Chinese Bank (Chinese: 中華商業銀行), The bank had a network of eight branches, providing a full range of insurance, personal, commercial, corporate, private banking and investment services to its customers in Taiwan. In 2007, The Hongkong and Shanghai Banking Corporation acquired one of Taiwan's leading factoring companies, Chailease Credit Services, and opened a new life insurance company. In 2006, HSBC Direct launched, it is the first Direct Banking services in Taiwan.

In March 2008, The bank acquired the business and operations of The Chinese Bank in Taiwan, which gave HSBC an additional 39 branch licenses, increasing its network at the time five-fold. In 2009, HSBC Bank (Taiwan) Limited established, and operated through the locally incorporated entity in May 2010.
