= Banco Santiago del Estero =

Bank in Santiago del Estero, Argentina

Banco de Santiago del Estero S.A.
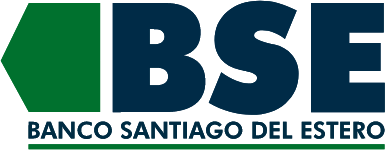
- Type: Privately held company
- Industry: Financial services
- Founded: December 18, 1911 as "Banco Comercial y Edificador de Santiago del Estero"
- Headquarters: Av. Belgrano 529, Santiago del Estero, Argentina
- Key people: Gustavo Eduardo Ick (President)
- Products: Retail Banking; Business finance; Trade finance; Factoring; Mutual funds; Pension funds; Insurance; Mortgages; Consumer Finance; Credit cards
- Number of employees: 1,000
- Website: bse.com.ar

The Banco Santiago del Estero is an Argentine bank that is the largest financial institution in the Santiago del Estero Province. It operates as a commercial bank serving the retail financial market and acts as the primary financial agent for the government of the Santiago del Estero Province.

Headquartered in the City of Santiago del Estero, the bank maintains branches and payment centers throughout the interior of the province, alongside regional branches in Buenos Aires, Córdoba, Catamarca, Tucumán, Salta, and Jujuy.

== History ==
=== Early years ===
On December 18, 1911, the institution was founded as the "Banco Comercial y Edificador de Santiago del Estero" by entrepreneur Luis Suárez and a group of local residents. It was established with an initial capital of m$n 500,000, which later expanded to m$n 1 million. By 1923, under the management of Suárez and accountant Andrés Pereda, the bank handled an annual cash flow of m$n 35 million, primarily offering long-term credits for residential construction.

=== Public capitalization and nationalization ===
The economic fallout from the Great Depression forced the private shareholders to accept public capitalization in 1932 under the provincial administration of Juan Bautista Castro. Through provincial law 1,144, the bank was restructured into a mixed-ownership entity and renamed "Banco de la Provincia de Santiago del Estero".

In 1953, under the governorship of Francisco Javier González and the passage of provincial law 2,939, the state nationalized the institution completely, converting it into an autonomous entity under the local provincial government.

=== Expansion and privatization ===
During the mid-20th century, the bank established its initial branch network along major railway lines within the provincial interior, including locations in La Banda, Añatuya, Suncho Corral, and Frías. In 1961, a metropolitan branch was opened on Florida Street in the city of Buenos Aires. By 1971, the network expanded to 20 branches employing 340 staff members.

Following a severe provincial fiscal crisis in the early 1990s, the financial institution faced insolvency. On September 2, 1996, following an international public bidding process, the bank was officially privatized, with controlling stakes awarded to Grupo Ick and Banco Florencia S.A.
