= HSBC Expat =

Offshore bank of HSBC Group

- Company type: Subsidiary of HSBC Holdings plc
- Industry: Finance and Insurance
- Headquarters: Saint Helier, Jersey, Channel Islands
- Products: Financial services
- Website: www.expat.hsbc.com

HSBC Expat, formerly HSBC International, is the offshore banking arm and wholly owned by HSBC based in Saint Helier, Jersey, Channel Islands.

== Operations ==
HSBC Expat focuses on providing finance and cross border services to expatriates and migrants. It offers its global services in over 100 countries.

Its key business operations include multi-currency accounts for easy management of finances across borders, wealth management and investments for international clients, insurance suited to expatriates' needs, international mortgage services, tax planning, and managing global wealth.
