= HSBC Bank Bermuda =

HSBC Bank Bermuda Limited
- Company type: Subsidiary
- Industry: Finance and Insurance
- Founded: 1889; 137 years ago
- Headquarters: Hamilton, Bermuda
- Key people: L. Anthony Joaquin (chairman); Steve Banner (CEO)
- Products: Financial services
- Operating income: US$262m (2016)
- Net income: US$117m (2016)
- Number of employees: 320
- Parent: HSBC Holdings plc
- Website: www.hsbc.bm

The original logo of The Bank of Bermuda before it joined the HSBC Group

HSBC Bank Bermuda Limited, previously the Bank of Bermuda Limited, is a financial services company in Bermuda providing retail and corporate banking, investment, custody and fund administration services to international and local clients. In 2004 the HSBC Group acquired the Bank of Bermuda, which has since become a focus for certain fund management and private banking activities. The bank sold much of its Cayman operations in 2014, and disposed its private banking operations at the end of April 2016. The three remaining divisions are retail banking wealth management (including HSBC Asset Management and Premier banking), commercial banking and global banking and markets. These three businesses represent over 90% of total revenues.

== History ==
=== Foundation ===
In 1889, Bermudian merchants founded the Bank of Bermuda, a second bank to compete with N. T. Butterfield & Son. The Bank of Bermuda took over the branch that the Merchants' Bank of Halifax, Nova Scotia had established in 1886 to take over the agency it had awarded to N. T. Butterfield & Son Ltd. The merchants formally incorporated the Bank of Bermuda in 1890.

=== Acquisition by the HSBC Group ===
The Bank of Bermuda grew to a presence in 17 of the world's key financial and offshore centers including Bahrain, Cayman Islands, Cook Islands, Dublin, Guernsey, Hong Kong, Isle of Man, Japan, Jersey, London, Luxembourg, New York, New Zealand, Singapore, South Africa and Switzerland prior to its acquisition by the HSBC Group in February 2004. Shareholders accepted an offer valuing the Bank at US$1.3 billion, the initial offer having been made on 28 October 2003. Most of Bank of Bermuda's operations in these overseas locations were amalgamated with HSBC offices in 2004.

In 2015, HSBC Bermuda sold its Trust and Investment Business operations to N. T. Butterfield & Son.

In 2018, Steve Banner replaced Mark Watkinson as CEO of the bank, after the bank had launched the first US Treasury Fund to be domiciled in Bermuda.

== Activities ==
In 2009, HSBC Bank Bermuda had a 41% market share in terms of deposits in Bermuda, trailing Butterfield Bank at 51%.

== See also ==
- HSBC Holdings plc
