= HSBC Bank Georgia =

HSBC Bank Georgia JSC HSBC ბანკი საქართველოს
- Company type: Subsidiary of HSBC Holdings plc
- Industry: Finance and Insurance
- Founded: 2008
- Defunct: 2011
- Headquarters: Tbilisi, Georgia
- Key people: Antony Turner, CEO
- Products: Financial services

HSBC Bank Georgia JSC (Georgian: HSBC ბანკი საქართველოს, romanized: HSBC bank'i sakartvelos) was a subsidiary of HSBC Holdings plc headquartered in Tbilisi, Georgia. The bank provided personal banking and corporate banking services. In 2011, HSBC announced that it would close its Georgian business.

== History ==
HSBC Bank Georgia JSC, a subsidiary of HSBC Holdings plc, commenced operations in Tbilisi in June 2008, marking HSBC’s entry into the Georgian banking sector. The bank was a locally licensed joint venture, with HSBC Holdings plc holding a 70% ownership stake and members of overseas businesses holding the remaining 30%. HSBC’s presence in Georgia was part of its strategy to expand into emerging markets and provide comprehensive banking services to corporate clients.

In September 2011, following a strategic review, HSBC announced its decision to exit the Georgian market, citing limited size and scale as the primary reasons for withdrawal. Guy Lewis, Chief Executive of HSBC Bank Georgia, stated that despite considerable efforts, the bank felt it was the right time to withdraw from the market.

In December 2011, HSBC Bank Georgia entered into an agreement to sell its legacy personal and mortgage loan portfolio to Bank Republic JSC, a subsidiary of the Société Générale Group. The value of the gross assets sold was approximately USD 4.5 million as of November 23, 2011. The full withdrawal from Georgia was completed by early 2012.

== See also ==
- List of banks in Georgia (country)
