= HSBC Sri Lanka =

Sri Lankan financial services company

- Type: Subsidiary
- Industry: Financial services
- Founded: 1 July 1892; 134 years ago
- Defunct: April 30, 2026
- Fate: Merge with Nations Trust Bank
- Headquarters: Colombo, Sri Lanka
- Key people: Mark Surgenor (CEO)
- Products: Retail Banking and Wealth Management Commercial Banking Global Banking and Markets
- Number of employees: 760
- Parent: HSBC Holdings plc
- Website: www.hsbc.lk

HSBC Sri Lanka was a banking and financial services company in Sri Lanka and is a licensed commercial bank supervised by the Central Bank of Sri Lanka. Founded in 1892 (just 27 years after its first offices were established in Hong Kong and Shanghai), it was one of the oldest banks in Sri Lanka. The company maintained an international outlook from the start, while its activities centered on trade finance.

On 24 September 2025, HSBC Sri Lanka entered into a sale and purchase agreement (SPA), to sell its retail banking business in Sri Lanka to Nations Trust Bank in a deal valued at Rs. 18 billion plus taxes (approximately US$60 million). The sale is expected to be completed in the first half of 2026.

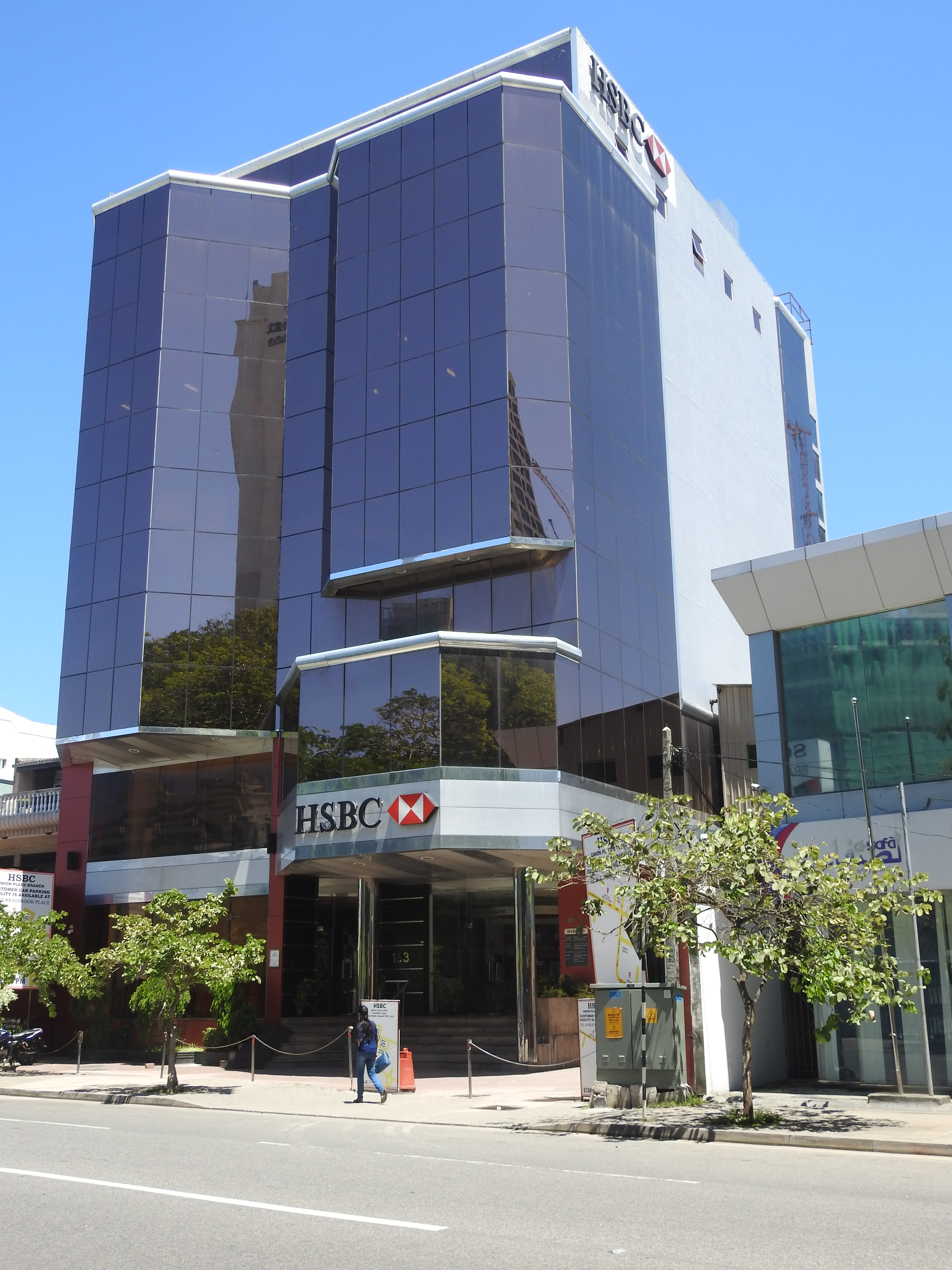
Union Place branch in March 2017.
