= HSBC Bank Polska =

HSBC Bank Polska S.A.
- Type: Subsidiary
- Industry: Finance and Insurance
- Headquarters: Warsaw, Poland
- Key people: Janusz Dedo, CEO, Sumanth Pasupuleti, CTO & Head of Commercial & Global Banking Line
- Products: Financial services
- Parent: HSBC
- Website: www.hsbc.pl

HSBC Bank Polska S.A. was a bank in Poland. It offered consumer finance, corporate banking, and treasury services, with headquarters in Piłsudski Square, Warsaw.

== Polski Kredyt Bank S.A. integration into the HSBC Group ==
On the 11 September 2003, the Polish Commission of Banking Supervision announced its approval for the acquisition of Polski Kredyt Bank S.A. from its parent, Kredyt Bank S.A. and the granting of a new banking licence to the bank. HSBC agreed a price of approximately PLN31 million (approximately US$7.8 million), and renamed Polski Kredyt Bank S.A. as HSBC Bank Polska S.A. following completion.

HSBC Holdings plc announceds the appointment of Sumanth Pasupuleti as a Chief Technology Officer (CTO) of HSBC Bank Polaska S.A and Head of Commercial & Global Banking Line Designate from 1 June 2017.

HSBC Bank Polska S.A. was converted into a branch of Paris-based HSBC Continental Europe in 2019.

== See also ==
- List of banks in Poland
