= HSBC Hong Kong =

Hong Kong subsidiary of HSBC Group

The Hongkong and Shanghai Banking Corporation Limited

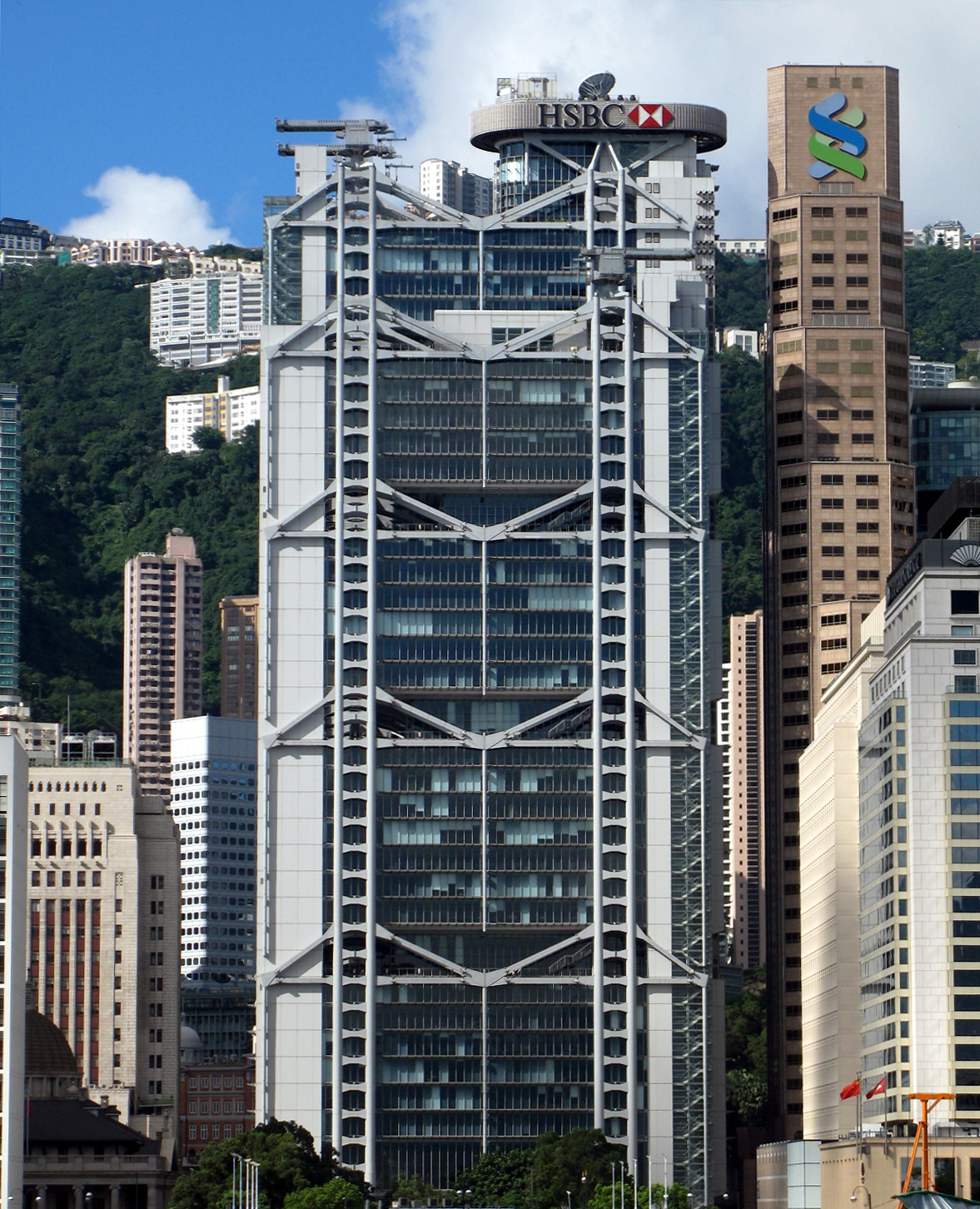
- HSBC Main Building (HSBC headquarters), Central, Hong Kong
- Trade name: HSBC; HongkongBank
- Native name: 香港上海滙豐銀行有限公司
- Formerly: The Hongkong and Shanghai Bank
- Type: Subsidiary
- Industry: Financial services
- Founded: 3 March 1865; 161 years ago in British Hong Kong; Incorporated on 14 August 1866; 160 years ago
- Founder: Sir Thomas Sutherland
- Headquarters: HSBC Main Building, 1 Queen's Road Central, Central, Hong Kong
- Key people: Peter Wong (chairman); David Liao (co-CEO); Surendra Rosha (co-CEO)
- Products: Retail banking, commercial banking, investment banking, mortgage loans, private banking, wealth management, credit cards, finance and insurance
- Number of employees: 20,000 (2024)
- Parent: HSBC
- Subsidiaries: Hang Seng Bank; HSBC Bank (China); HSBC Insurance; HSBC Broking Services (Asia); HSBC Global Asset Management (Hong Kong); HSBC Private Equity (Asia); HSBC Securities (Asia)
- Website: www.hsbc.com.hk

HSBC Hong Kong
- Traditional Chinese: 香港上海滙豐銀行有限公司
- Simplified Chinese: 香港上海汇丰银行有限公司
- Cantonese Yale: Heūnggóng Seuhnghói Wuihfūng ngànhòng yaúhhaahn gūngsī
Transcriptions
Standard Mandarin
- Hanyu Pinyin: Xiānggǎng Shànghǎi Huìfēng Yínháng Yǒuxiàn gōngsī
- Wade–Giles: Hsiang Kang Shang Hai Hui Feng In Hang Yu Hsien Kung Ssŭ
Yue: Cantonese
- Yale Romanization: Heūnggóng Seuhnghói Wuihfūng ngànhòng yaúhhaahn gūngsī
- Jyutping: Hoeng1gong2 soeng6hoi2 wui6fung1 ngan4hong4 jau5haan6 gung1si1
- IPA: [hœ́ːŋ kɔ̌ːŋ sœ̀ːŋ hɔ̌ːy wùːy fóŋ ŋɐ̏n hɔ̏ːŋ jɐ̬u hàːn kóŋ síː]

Alternative Chinese name
- Traditional Chinese: 滙豐
- Simplified Chinese: 汇丰
- Cantonese Yale: Wuihfūng
- Literal meaning: focus of wealth
Transcriptions
Standard Mandarin
- Hanyu Pinyin: Huìfēng
- Wade–Giles: Hui-feng
Yue: Cantonese
- Yale Romanization: Wuihfūng
- Jyutping: wui6fung1
- IPA: [wùːy fóŋ]

The Hongkong and Shanghai Banking Corporation Limited (Chinese: 香港上海滙豐銀行有限公司; commonly abbreviated as HSBC Hong Kong or simply HSBC (Chinese: 滙豐; lit. 'focus of wealth'; romanized as Wayfoong by the bank); formerly known as HongkongBank) is the Hong Kong–based Asia-Pacific subsidiary of the British HSBC banking group, for which it was the parent entity until 1991. The largest bank in Hong Kong, HSBC operates branches and offices throughout the Indo-Pacific region and in other countries around the world. It is also one of the three commercial banks licensed by the Hong Kong Monetary Authority to issue banknotes for the Hong Kong dollar.

The Hongkong and Shanghai Bank was established in British Hong Kong in 1865 and was incorporated as The Hongkong and Shanghai Banking Corporation in 1866, and has been based in Hong Kong (although now as a subsidiary) ever since. It is the founding member of the HSBC group of banks and companies, and, since 1990, is the namesake and one of the leading subsidiaries of the London-based HSBC Holdings. The company's business ranges from the traditional High Street roles of retail banking, commercial banking, corporate banking to investment banking, private banking and global banking.

== Hong Kong banking ==
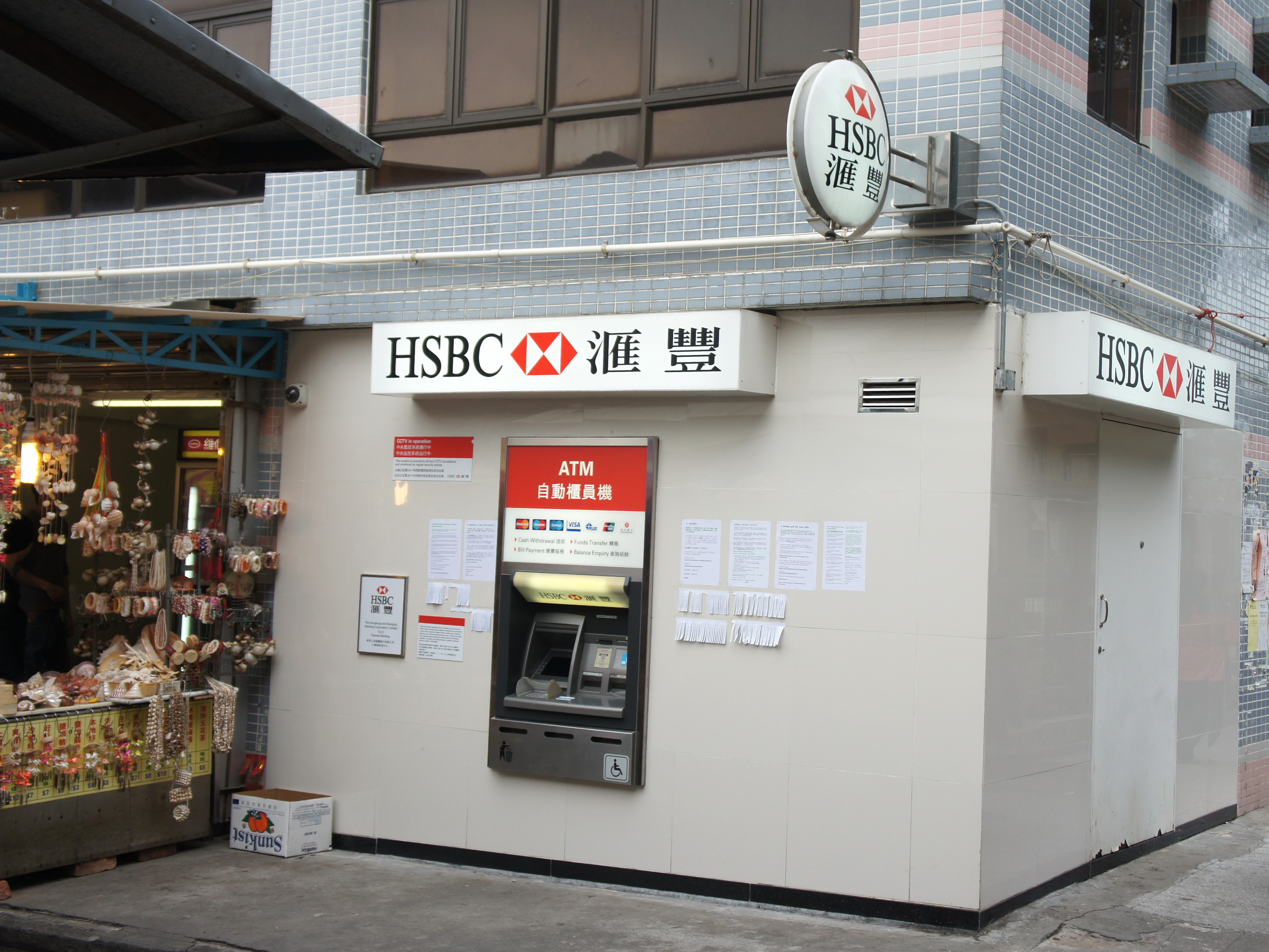
An HSBC ATM at Tai O, Lantau Island, Hong Kong

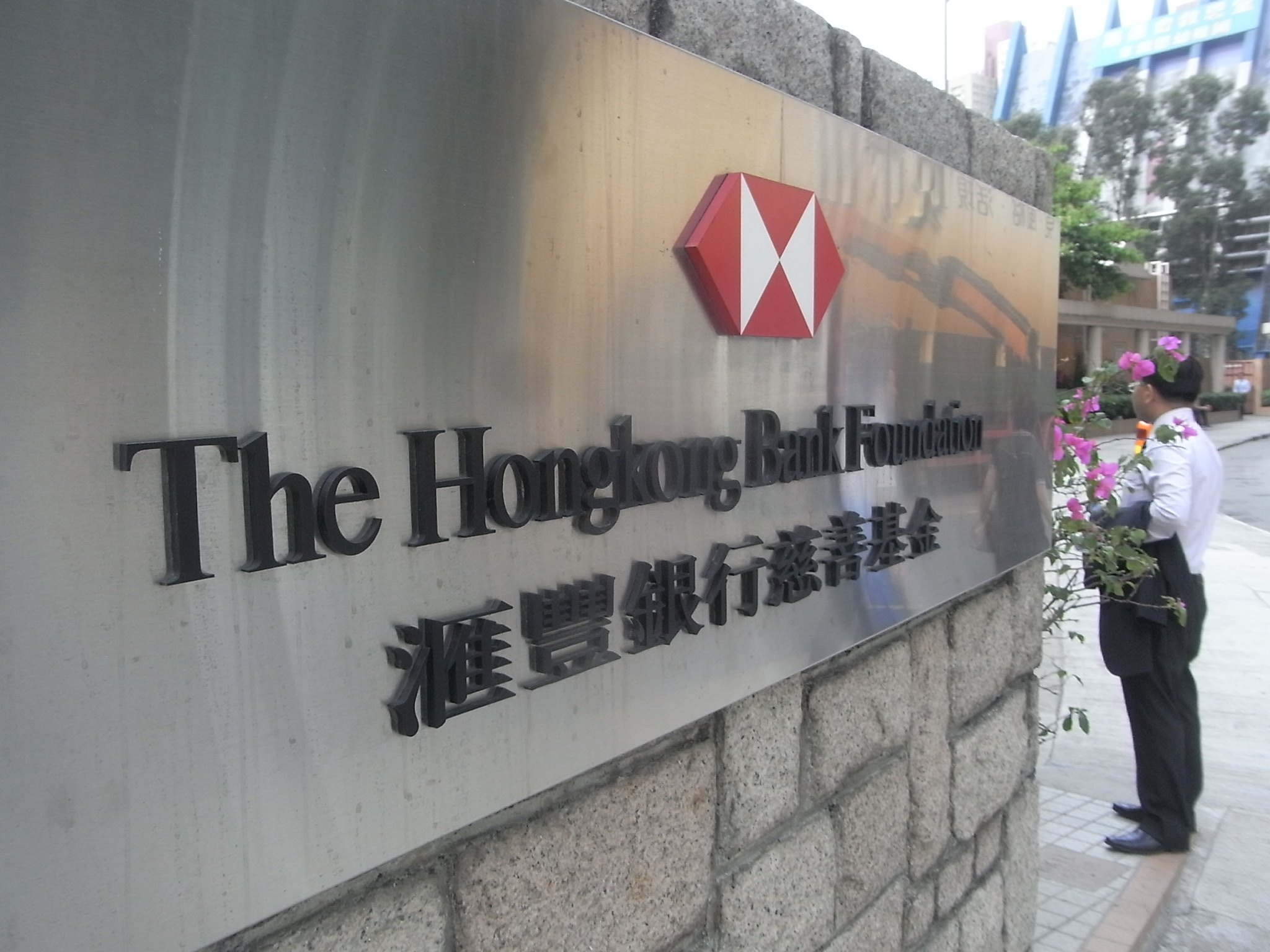
The HongkongBank Foundation

Under the HSBC brand, the bank maintains a network of around 220 branches throughout Hong Kong, from which it offers a wide range of financial products and services. For some time in the late 1980s and early 1990s, the bank was known by the name HongkongBank in its native city, although it now trades as HSBC. During that period, it also adopted the idiosyncratic practice of calling its ATMs Electronic Teller Card (ETC) machines.

=== Headquarters ===
The HSBC Hong Kong headquarters building is located in No 1 Queen's Road Central in the Central district on Hong Kong Island. It was also home to HSBC Holdings's headquarters until the latter firm's move to London to meet the requirements of the UK regulatory authorities after the acquisition of the Midland Bank in 1992. It was designed by British architect Norman, Lord Foster, and was the most expensive building in the world based on usable floor area at the time it was built.

=== Hong Kong dollar bank notes ===
A HK$20 note issued by the HSBC

HSBC is one of the three commercial banks which are authorised to issue banknotes for Hong Kong – the other two being the Bank of China (Hong Kong) and Standard Chartered Bank (Hong Kong). Of the total notes in circulation measured by value, HSBC is the most prolific issuer, its notes representing 67.7% of those in issue. Hong Kong is unusual in that it is one of the few countries or territories where commercial banks are still permitted to issue their own banknotes.

=== Closure of bank accounts ===
In June 2023, it was reported that HSBC had closed the bank accounts of the pro-democracy League of Social Democrats (LSD), and had refused to give reasons for its decision.

=== Digital assets development ===
In April 2026, HSBC has been awarded Hong Kong's one of the first stablecoin issuer licences by Hong Kong Monetary Authority.

== Other Hong Kong operations ==
=== Hang Seng Bank ===
HSBC acquired a 62.14%, controlling interest in the local Hang Seng Bank in 1965 during a crisis of the latter. The Hang Seng Index for stock prices in Hong Kong is named after the Hang Seng Bank.

In October 2025, HSBC, the majority shareholder of Hang Seng Bank, announced that it would privatise Hang Seng Bank by purchasing the 38% that it didn't already own, and take the company off the SEHK after completion.

=== PayMe ===
In 2017, HSBC launched the PayMe brand and mobile app, which features as a social payment app in Hong Kong, available to all non-HSBC users.

=== HSBC Insurance ===
HSBC Insurance provides insurance products and services to international and local brokers, agents and direct customers in Hong Kong, mainland China, Macau, Singapore, India and Malaysia.

== Asia Pacific operations ==
The Hongkong and Shanghai Banking Corporation maintains a network of around 600 offices in 20 countries in Asia Pacific, as well as owning of a number of HSBC banks operating in various countries and holding the group's stakes in further lenders, particularly in China.

Operations of the group in the Asia Pacific are under this subsidiary, and it forms the regional headquarters for Asia Pacific. This means that it is responsible for entities such as HSBC Bank Australia Limited, Hang Seng Bank Limited, HSBC Bank (China) Company Limited, HSBC Bank Malaysia Berhad (since 2009), HSBC Bank (Vietnam), HSBC Bank (Taiwan) and HSBC Insurance (Asia-Pacific) Holdings Limited, and the management of stakes in Bank of Communications (19.9%), Barrowgate Limited (24.64%) and Industrial Bank. But excluding the majority of the HSBC's Private Banking business in Asia Pacific.

=== Bangladesh ===
HSBC started operations in 1996. The bank primarily focuses on urban areas and has branches in most areas of the capital city of Dhaka, it also has branches in the city of Chittagong. The bank also has a good number of ATM booths in the cities present, it also has booths in most five star hotels.

HSBC Bangladesh is rated 'AAA' in the Long-term and ST-1 rating in the Short-term, which are the highest level of ratings for any bank or financial institution in Bangladesh.

HSBC Bangladesh has a help centre which operates on a daily basis. It is one of the very few banks in the country to offer day night banking. It also has begun to support education initiatives for people with disabilities; the bank recently partnered with the Blind Education and Rehabilitation Development Organisation to give scholarships to people with blindness.

=== Brunei ===
On 6 April 2016, HSBC Brunei commenced winding down its operation in Brunei as a part of HSBC Group global review. The bank which comprise retail, commercial and global banking services will no longer take on any new accounts, facilities or business from that date. Employees of the bank have been offered fair redundancy packages. On 9 and 10 November 2017, all HSBC Brunei branches and ATMs had ceased its operations. The remaining accounts were all transferred to the local, Baiduri Bank on the same date.

=== China ===
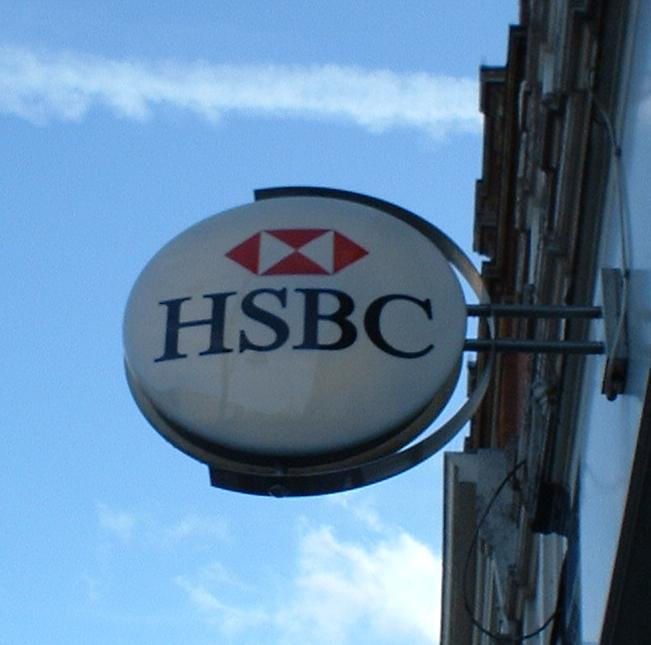
HSBC logo

HSBC established its Shanghai branch office on 3 March 1865 and has had a continuous presence in the city since then, except during the Japanese Occupation. Until the economic reforms of the late 1970s, its activities were mainly in inward remittances and export bills, however its activities now span a wider range.

On 6 August 2004, HSBC announced that it would pay US$1.75 billion for a 19.9% stake in Shanghai-based Bank of Communications. At the time of the announcement, Bank of Communications was China's fifth-largest bank and the investment by HSBC was eight times bigger than any previous foreign investment in a Chinese bank. The industry considered this move, giving HSBC a lead in the race to grab pieces of mainland China's banking market. A year earlier, HSBC had joined with Hong Kong's Shanghai Commercial Bank to purchase an 11% stake in Bank of Shanghai (HSBC paid US$62.6 million for an 8% stake) and US$733 million for a 10% stake in Ping An Insurance.

On 1 April 2007, the mainland China offices of The Hongkong and Shanghai Banking Corporation transferred to its subsidiary HSBC Bank (China), and it started operations on 2 April.

In July 2022, HSBC became the first foreign lender to open a Chinese Communist Party (CCP) committee in its Chinese investment banking subsidiary. The subsidiary, HSBC Qianhai Securities, is a 90% HSBC-owned joint venture.

=== India ===
In 1959 HSBC acquired The Mercantile Bank of India, London and China, established in October 1853 in Bombay. HSBC is now one of the fastest growing foreign banks in India, both in domestic banking and support operations for worldwide operations (see Group Service Centres).

=== Indonesia ===
The Hongkong and Shanghai Banking Corporation opened its first Indonesian office in Jakarta in 1884. Having been able to restart its operations after the Second World War, it was again forced to close in the mid-1960s, however the bank was granted a new banking licence in 1968 its operations have grown to make it one of the largest foreign banks operating in Indonesia.

=== Japan ===
HSBC opened its first Japan operations in Yokohama in 1866, followed by branches in other trading ports such as Osaka, Kobe and Nagasaki. It was heavily involved in the early development of Japan's current monetary system, and consulted with the government regarding fiscal policy, currency printing and related matters.

HSBC does not conduct ordinary retail banking in Japan, but conducts investment banking in Tokyo and Osaka. Since 2007 it has expanded its HSBC Premier private banking services for the "Mass affluent" market or high-net-worth individual clients. HSBC Premier has seven Premier branches in Japan including centers in the Hiroo, Akasaka, Marunouchi (flagship), Ginza, Yokohama, Ikebukuro, areas of Tokyo and one in Kobe.

In December 2011, HSBC announced to selling its private bank in Japan to Swiss peer Credit Suisse for an undisclosed sum, but at the end of October 2011 the value of the gross assets included in the sale was about $2.7 billion. It was a strategy to cut $3.5 billion annual costs by quitting businesses or countries where it lacks scale which Credit Suisse has a larger business in Japan than HSBC and in line with a global business restructuring it announced that will see it cut 30,000 jobs as it pares back small or inefficient operations.

=== New Zealand ===
HSBC's operations in New Zealand are as a branch of The Hongkong and Shanghai Banking Corporation, which first gained a licence from the Reserve Bank of New Zealand on 22 July 1987. Today HSBC offers a range of financial products from a network of 9 offices.

=== Philippines ===
HSBC's history in the Philippines dates back more than 150 years with the establishment of their first branch no. 90 Rosario Street (Now Quintin Paredes Street) in Binondo, Manila in 1875. In its early years of operation, HSBC serviced the booming Philippine sugar industry in the Visayas region by opening its first branch outside Manila in Iloilo in 1883. At the turn of the century, it financed railways that connected provincial towns across Luzon to Manila. During the American regime, HSBC was called to advise on Philippine currency reform. Its current headquarters are in Bonifacio Global City. Today, HSBC Philippines operates in key Philippine cities such as Cebu and Davao. It has ended Citibank and Standard Chartered's duopoly on international banking in the Philippines and currently the last among the former with retail banking operations in the Philippines since the Philippine exit of Citibank in 2023.

=== Singapore ===
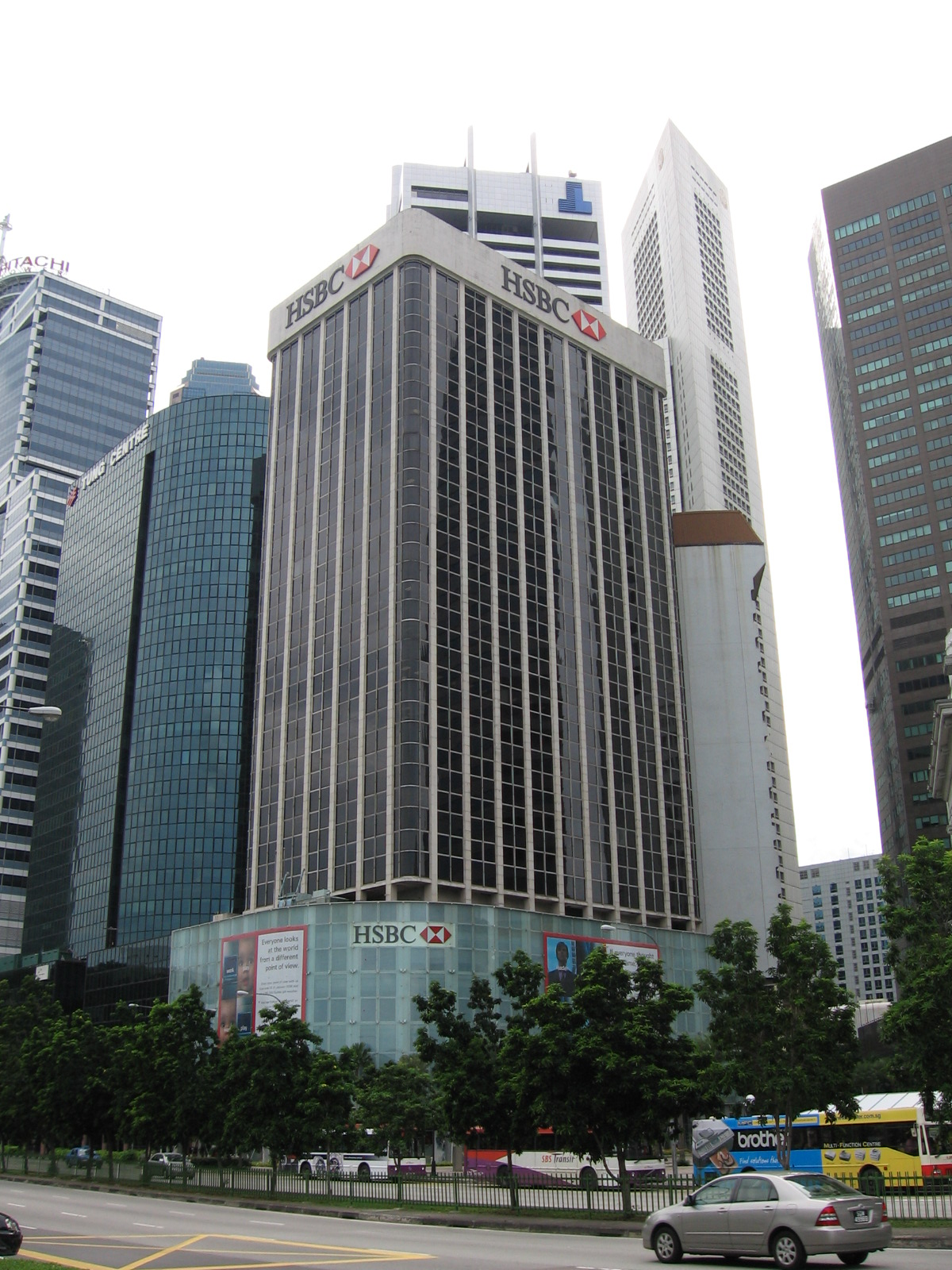
HSBC Singapore branch head office located at Collyer Quay, Central Area, Singapore

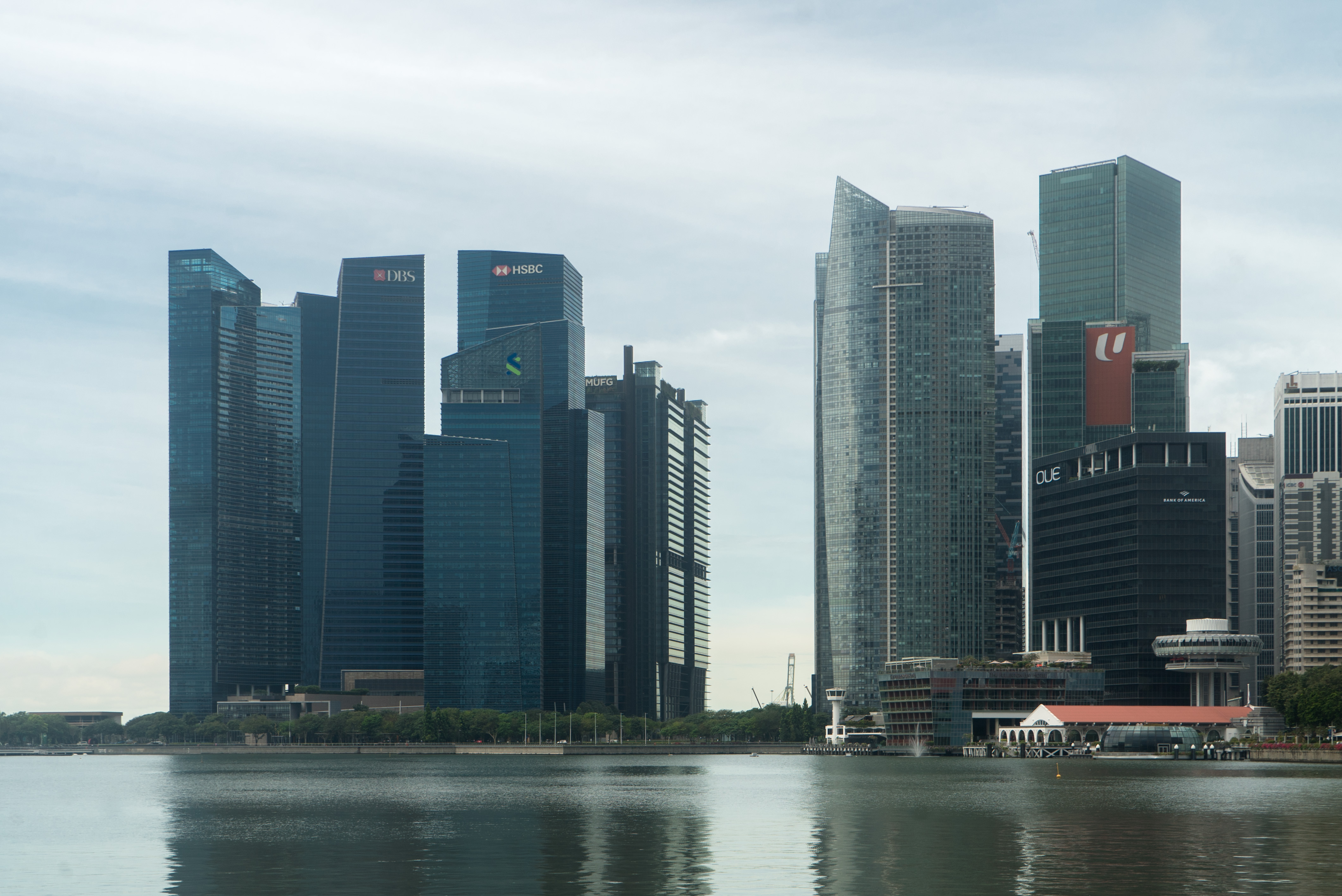
Marina Bay Financial Centre, which is new HSBC Singapore headquarter

In Singapore, the Hongkong and Shanghai Banking Corporation Limited operates as a full service bank with its headquarters in Collyer Quay. It opened its doors in December 1877. In 2016, HSBC has created a locally incorporated bank in Singapore and has moved its retail and wealth business from HSBC Singapore Branch to the locally incorporated bank. Today, HSBC's flagship office remains at the original Collyer Quay site where its first branch was opened. Its main office is located at Mapletree Business City in Pasir Panjang, HarbourFront.

HSBC Singapore is a Qualifying Full Bank and offers a comprehensive range of financial services including commercial banking, investment and private banking, insurance, forfaiting and trustee services, and securities and capital markets services.

The retail and wealth business operated through the locally incorporated bank has 12 branches incorporating 10 HSBC Premier Centres and 33 Automated Teller Machines in Singapore.

In the 1960s, a group of Indonesian forces bombed the HSBC building in Singapore, just a few months after Singapore was granted its independence from Malaysia. A number of people were killed and the two military officers responsible for the bombing were tried and executed.

=== South Korea ===
HSBC is expanding in competitive South Korean market, operating from a network of 11 branches, the first having been opened in Jemulpo in 1897.

=== Sri Lanka ===
HSBC has been present in Sri Lanka for 120 years. The Hongkong and Shanghai Banking Corporation Limited established its first branch in Colombo Sri Lanka on 1 July 1892, just 27 years after it began operating in Hong Kong and Shanghai. It has established itself as one of the largest and most profitable banks operating in the country. It has achieved leadership in Corporate Banking, Capital Markets and Credit Card issuance.

=== Taiwan ===
HSBC's presence in Taiwan dates back to 1885 when The Hongkong and Shanghai Banking Corporation appointed an agent in Tamsui. A full service branch was established in Taipei in 1984. The bank now has a network of 8 branches (Hyperlink to service channel) nationwide, including Taipei, Jianguo, Banqiao, Tianmu, Taoyuan, Taichung, Tainan, and Kaohsiung. In 2007, The Hongkong and Shanghai Banking Corporation acquired The Chinese Bank in Taiwan. The acquisition made HSBC's nationwide branch network increase to 47.

=== Thailand ===
HSBC initially opened for business in Thailand in 1888, becoming the first commercial bank in the country. HSBC has made significant contributions to the establishment of solid foundations for Thailand's financial and banking sectors. For example, in 1889 HSBC issued the first banknotes in Thailand. HSBC also issued the first foreign loan to the Thai government for its railroad construction project. HSBC's main branch office in Thailand is situated in Bangkok on Rama IV Road opposite Lumpini Park. In 2011, Phase 2 of the new Financial Sector Master Plan allowed foreign banks to open up to two branches in the Kingdom of Thailand in preparation for full retail operations. Accordingly, a second branch was opened on Thonglor (Sukhumvit 55) in early 2011.

In January 2012 HSBC announced the sale of its Thailand retail banking operations to the Krungsri Group (Bank of Ayudhya) and its intention to maintain only corporate banking business in Thailand. Its 2 retail branches will be closed in March and June 2012 respectively.

=== Vietnam ===
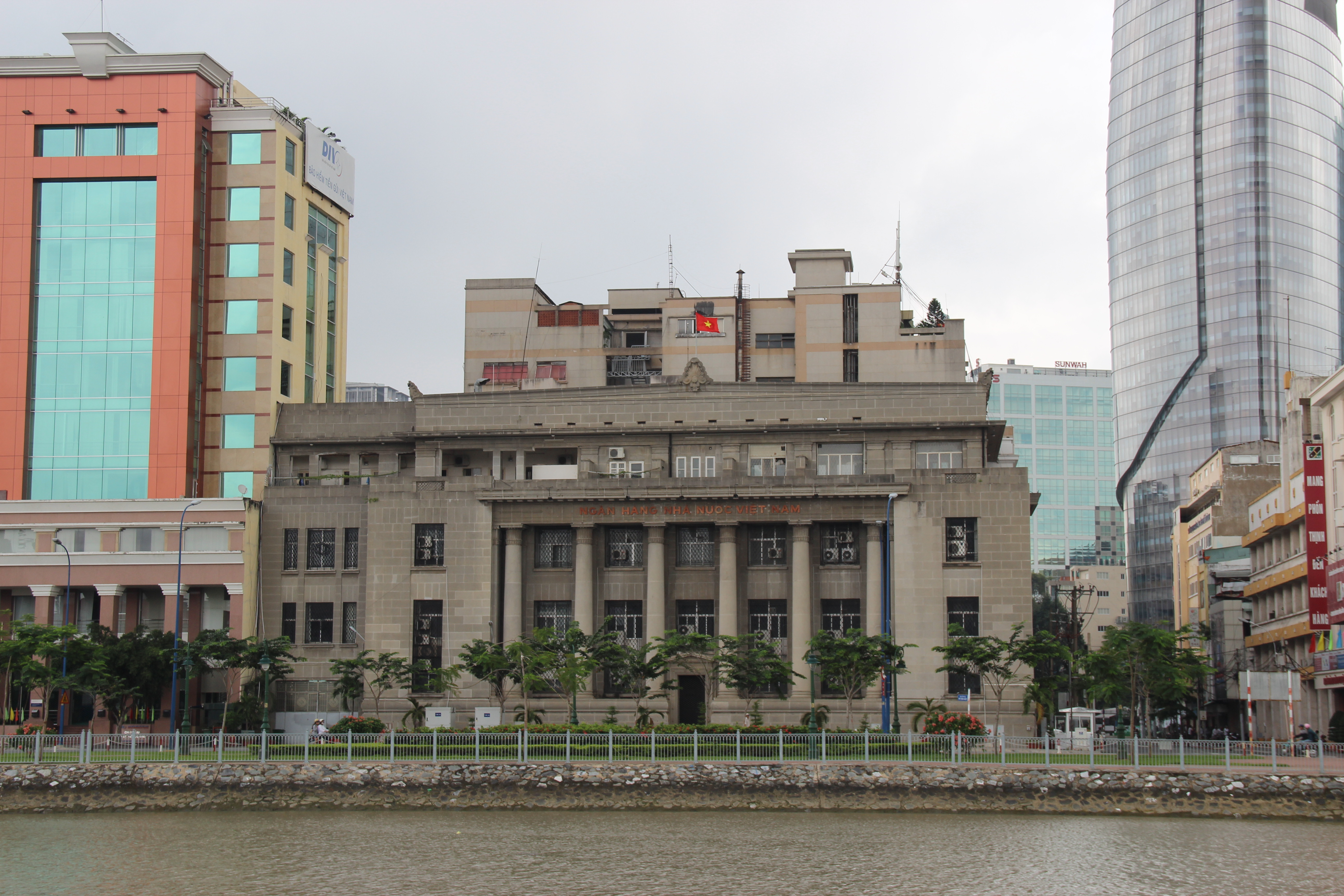
The former HSBC building in District 1, Saigon at 9 Bến Chương Dương, now used by the State Bank of Vietnam for HCMC branch, along with the nearby 17 Bến Chương Dương building

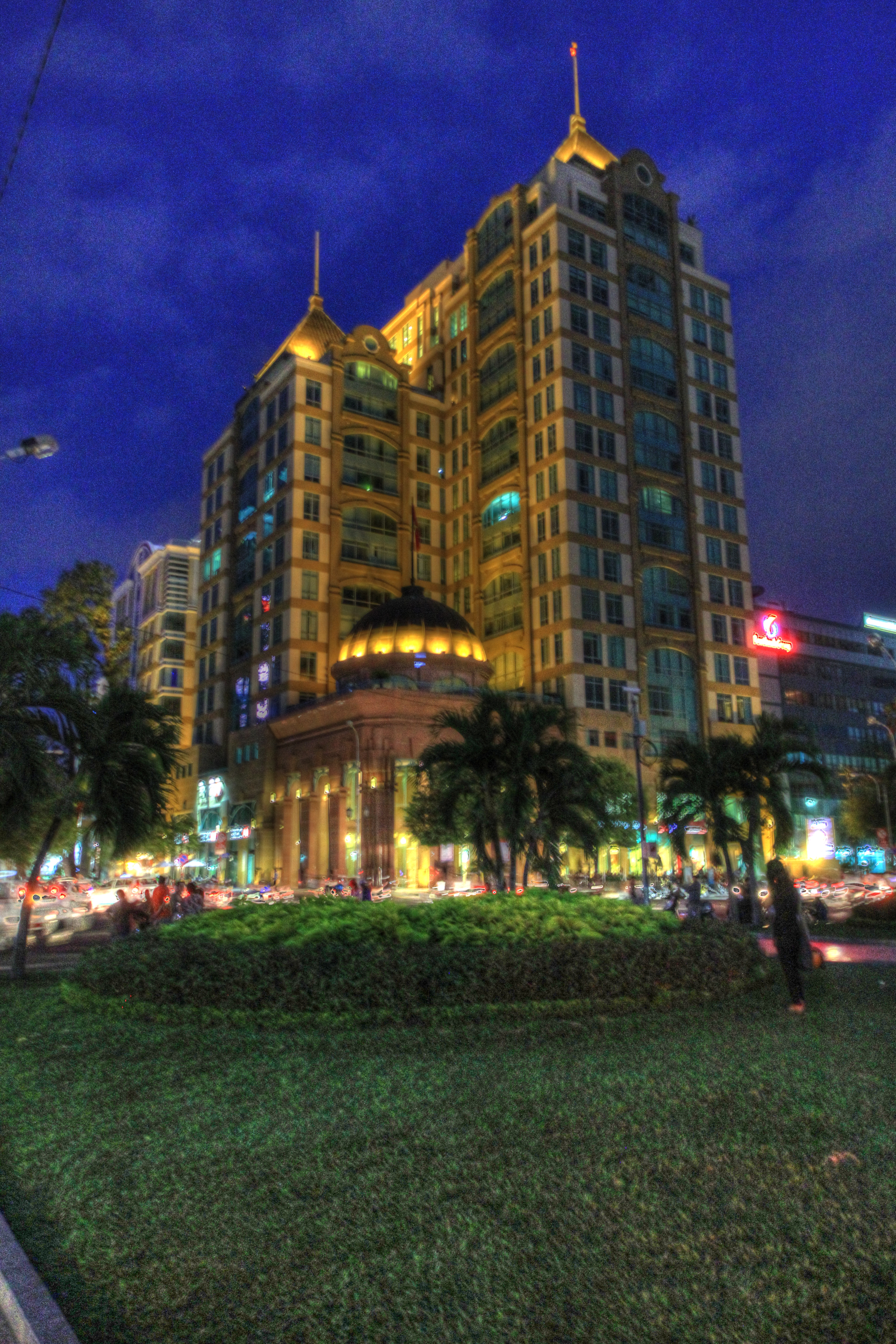
The current HSBC Vietnam headquarter located at The Metropolitan Tower, 235 Đồng Khởi Street, Bến Nghé, District 1

In Vietnam, HSBC first opened an office in Saigon (now Ho Chi Minh City) in 1870, but it was closed in 1975. In 1992, HSBC reopened a representative office in Ho Chi Minh City and opened another in Hanoi. In August 1995, HSBC opened a full-service branch in Ho Chi Minh City. In 2005, HSBC also opened its second branch in Hanoi and established a representative office in Can Tho.

On 29 December 2005, HSBC acquired 10% share capital of Vietnam Technological and Commercial Joint Stock Bank (Techcombank), one of the largest joint stock commercial banks in Vietnam by equity. In July 2007, HSBC became the first foreign bank to increase its stake in Techcombank to 15%. In September 2008, HSBC completed the increase of its stake in Techcombank to 20%, became the first foreign bank in Vietnam to hold a 20% interest in a domestic bank.

In September 2007, HSBC acquired 10% share capital of Bao Viet Holdings, becoming the sole foreign strategic partner of Vietnam's leading insurance company. In October 2009, HSBC signed an agreement to increase its shareholding in Bao Viet Holdings to 18% from 10% for VND1.88 trillion (approximately US$105.3 million).

On 1 January 2009, HSBC started operating its locally incorporated entity and became the first foreign bank to incorporate in Vietnam, after gaining approval from the State Bank of Vietnam (SBV) to set up a Wholly Foreign-Owned Bank (WFOB) in Vietnam in September 2008.

Financials in Hong Kong dollars
Year	2004	2005	2006	2007	2008	2009	2010	2011	2012	2013	2014	2015	2016	2017
Operating income, bln	81.01	94.51	114.8	154.0	139.0	155.1	171.4	187.6	217.3	259.2	233.6	235.9	232.7	255.2
Net profit, bln	36.55	37.20	42.61	65.31	54.98	50.21	63.28	73.90	90.72	129.1	92.18	99.98	84.80	96.02
Total assets, trln	2.487	2.673	3.151	3.952	4.260	4.361	5.040	5.607	6.065	6.439	6.877	6.954	7.549	7.943
Total equity, bln	100.1	114.4	165.4	245.9	216.5	260.2	320.1	371.3	473.1	522.2	608.3	635.9	679.1	753.0

== Leadership ==
- Chairman: Peter Wong (since June 2021); non-executive chairman
- Chief Executive: David Liao and Surendra Rosha (since June 2021); co-chief executives

=== Former chairmen ===
In 1991, the superseding position of group chairman of HSBC was formed; since then, the chairman of the Hongkong and Shanghai Banking Corporation has been held as an independent position, held concurrently by the chief executive of the Hongkong and Shanghai Banking Corporation, or held by the group chief executive of HSBC ex-officio.

1. William Purves (1991–1994), also HSBC group chairman until 1998
2. John Gray (1994–1996), concurrent chief executive
3. John Strickland (1997–1999)
4. David Eldon (1999–2005)
5. Vincent Cheng (2005–2010); first local Hong Kong Chinese chairman
6. Michael Geoghegan (2010–2011); group chief executive from 2006 to 2011
7. Stuart Gulliver (2011–2017); concurrent group chief executive
8. John Flint (2017–2019); concurrent group chief executive
9. Laura Cha (2019–2021); non-executive chairman

=== Former chief executives ===
In 1991, the superseding position of group chief executive of HSBC was formed, with the Chief Executive of the Hongkong Shanghai Banking Corporation now being the Asia-Pacific regional head.

1. John Gray (1993–1996)
2. David Eldon (1997–1999)
3. Aman Mehta (1999–2004)
4. Michael Smith (2004–2007)
5. Sandy Flockhart (2007–2009)
6. Peter Wong (2010–2021)

== Cultural references ==
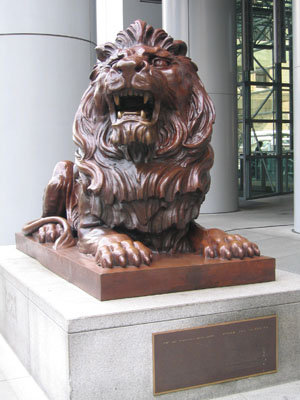
Left lion statue (Stephen)

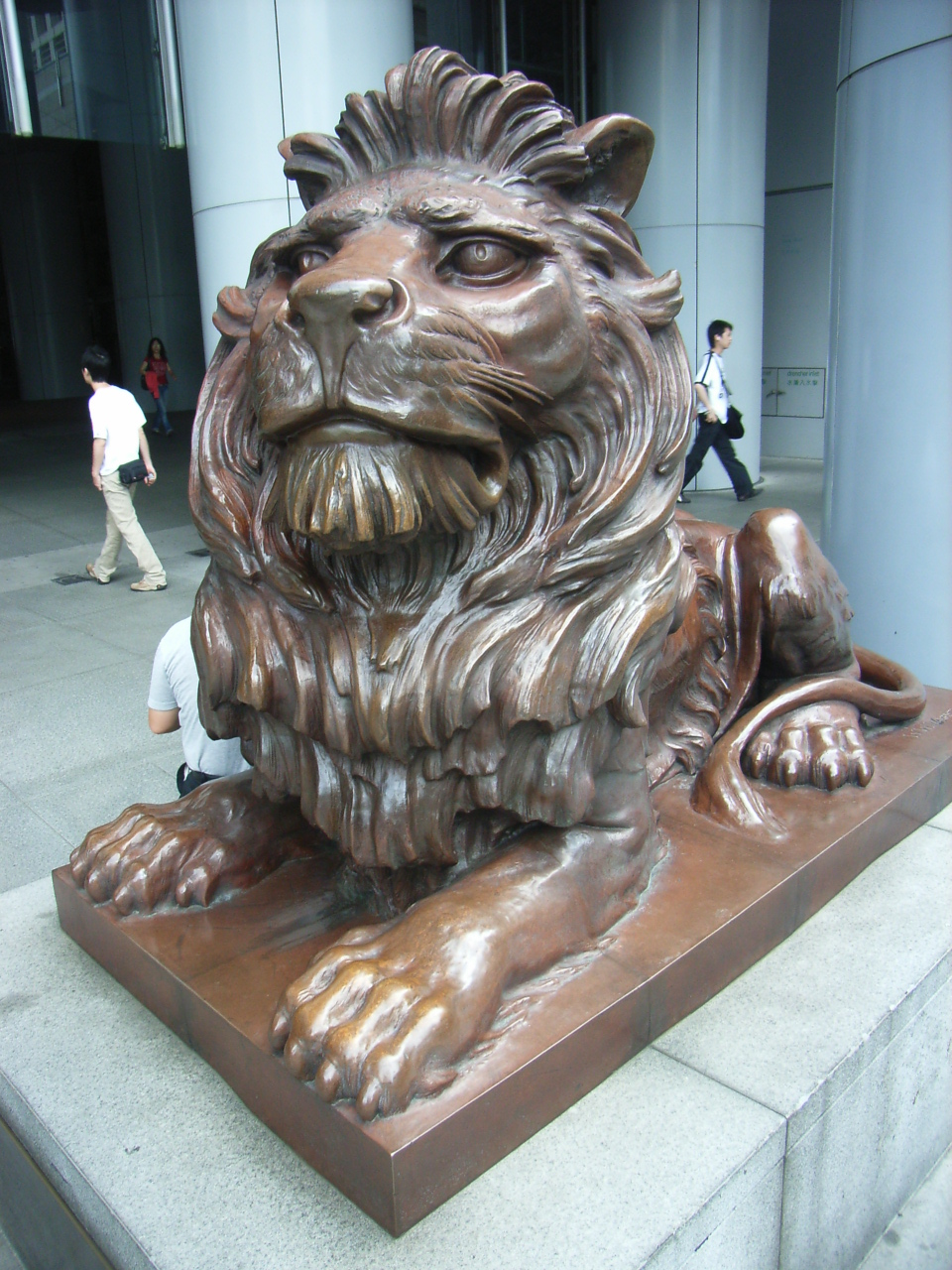
Right lion statue (Stitt)

The lion statues of HSBC Main Building in Hong Kong

In Hong Kong, the local population sometimes refers to the bank as 獅子銀行, "the Lion Bank", after the pair of lion sculptures outside the bank's headquarters, which also appear in some banknotes. Local films and television series set in Hong Kong, especially comedies, use this nickname when referring to the bank.

Although the Hong Kong Government changed the official spelling of "Hongkong" to "Hong Kong", by the instructions of the Secretary of State for the Colonies, on 3 September 1926, HSBC uses the older Hongkong, as the bank's name was conceived before the official declaration of the modern two-word name, and it was decided to retain the single word spelling in the bank's name: Hongkong.

The English humorist P. G. Wodehouse was a junior employee at the bank's London office in Lombard Street from 1900 to 1902, and used the bank as an inspiration for some of his early work, especially his 1910 novel Psmith in the City.

== See also ==
- HSBC Holdings plc
- HSBC Bank (China)
- HSBC Bank Australia
- HSBC Bank Malaysia
- Hang Seng Bank
- Bank of Communications
- HSBC Hong Kong headquarters building
