= HSBC México =

Mexican subsidiary of multinational bank

HSBC México, S.A.
- Type: Subsidiary
- Industry: Finance and Insurance
- Founded: 1941; 85 years ago
- Headquarters: HSBC Tower, Mexico City, Mexico
- Key people: Jorge Arce (CEO)
- Products: Financial services
- Number of employees: 22,000
- Parent: HSBC
- Website: www.hsbc.com.mx

HSBC México, S.A., the principal operating company of Grupo Financiero HSBC, S.A. de C.V., is one of Mexico's four largest banking and financial service companies, with 1,400 branches and 5,200 ATMs. HSBC purchased Banco Internacional, S.A. known as Bital, in November 2002, several years after Bital participated in the controversial Fobaproa, which rescued the nation's banks from the 1994 crisis, at the cost of the Mexican taxpayers.

HSBC's Mexico headquarters are at Torre HSBC on the Paseo de la Reforma near the Angel of Independence in Colonia Cuauhtémoc, Cuauhtémoc, Mexico City.

In July 2012, the US Senate accused HSBC of breaching safeguards that should have stopped the laundering of money from Mexico. HSBC had laundered over $800 million for the Sinaloa cartel and the Norte del Valle cartel. HSBC agreed to pay a $1.92 billion fine and separate itself from former executives Sandy Flockhart and Michael Geoghegan.

== Bital joins the HSBC Group ==
HSBC Holdings plc acquired GF Bital on November 22, 2002.

=== Rebranding ===
They were first known as Banco del Atlantico during the 1980s and later changed to Bital. On January 29, 2004 the entire branch network of Bital (Banco Internacional) was rebranded as HSBC overnight. HSBC saturated newspapers, television and radio, purchased advertising space on every luggage trolley at Mexico City International Airport, on the sides of taxis, on buses, on the plastic bags in which newspapers are delivered, on flower stalls the side of tall buildings around Mexico City. That same day Bital customers received new credit cards with the HSBC logo and notification of changes to their account numbers.

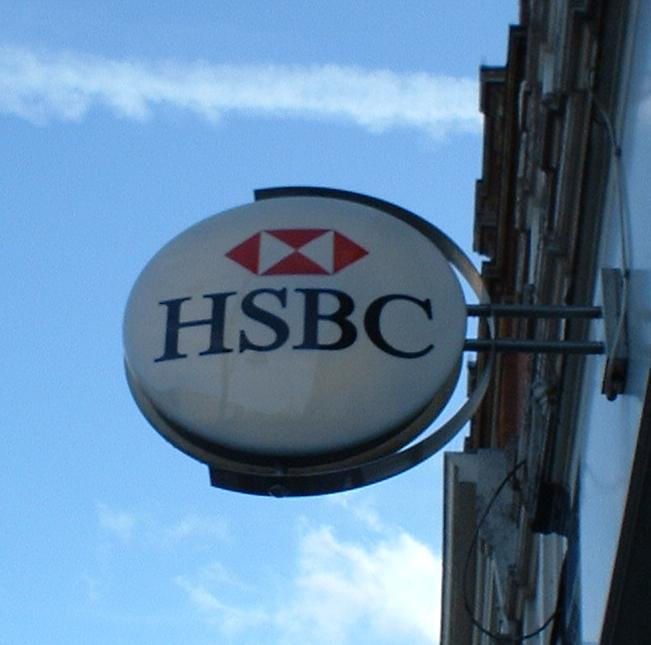
HSBC logo

== Mexican banking ==
Under the HSBC brand, the bank maintains a network of around 1400 branches nationwide, with the longest opening hours (8AM-7PM) including Saturdays. An innovation brought to the Mexican market was the first fixed-rate mortgage, which was an unusual product in Mexico, but was chosen to appeal to low-income customers concerned with the repossessions that followed the crisis of 1994-95.

=== ATM network ===
HSBC was the first Mexican bank to offer pre-approved personal loans via ATMs, and also has a program called "Niños con Futuro" which allows customers to make charitable donations via ATMs - this idea has since been taken up by HSBC Bank UK. HSBC Mexico also deploys advanced computerized modeling techniques to predict usage patterns for ATMs and ensure that they are best placed for usage and hence profit.

=== Pensions ===
On August 14, 2003, HSBC agreed to acquire AFORE Allianz Dresdner, S.A. de C.V., from the Allianz Group.

== Other Mexican Operations ==
HSBC México, S.A. Institución de Banca Múltiple (Bank)
HSBC Seguros, S.A. de C.V. (Insurance)
HSBC Afore, S.A. de C.V. (Pension Fund)
HSBC Fianzas, S.A.
HSBC Casa de Bolsa, S.A. de C.V. (Stockbroker)
HSBC Operadora de Fondos, S.A. de C.V.

HSBC also has a 19.99 percent stake in Financiera Independencia, S.A. de C.V. and its affiliate Serfincor, S.A. de C.V. which was acquired in the first half of 2006.

== Regional Operations ==
As a principal member of the HSBC Group HSBC Mexico is responsible for other operations in the area, principally HSBC Bank (Panama) S.A., HSBC Colombia S.A. formerly Grupo Banistmo, HSBC Costa Rica through the acquisition of the local bank Banex, HSBC El Salvador by the acquisition of the local bank Banco Salvadoreño and HSBC Honduras through what was BGA.

== Money laundering ==
In December 2012, HSBC was penalized $1.9 billion (US), the largest fine under the Bank Secrecy Act, for violating four U.S. laws designed to protect the U.S. financial system. HSBC had allegedly laundered at least $881 million in drugs proceeds through the U.S. financial system for international cartels, as well as processing an additional $660 million for banks in US sanctioned countries. According to the report, "The U.S. bank subsidiary [also] failed to monitor more than $670 million in wire transfers and more than $9.4 billion in purchases of physical dollars from its Mexico unit." As part of the agreement deferring its prosecution, HSBC acknowledged that for years it had ignored warning signs that drug cartels in Mexico were using its branches to launder millions of dollars, and also acknowledged that HSBC's international staff had stripped identifying information on transactions made through the United States from countries facing economic sanctions such as Iran and Sudan. Former HSBC Mexico Chief Executive Sandy Flockhart retired in 2012 from HSBC as part of the deal with the US authorities.

== See also ==
- HSBC Holdings plc

== Bibliography ==
- HSBC Mexico website
- Financial Times article "The difference a name makes", John Authers, 6 May 2004
