= Vincent Cheng Hoi-Chuen =

Hong Kong banker (1948–2022)

Vincent Cheng GBS JP OBE

Chairman of the Council of the Chinese University of Hong Kong
- In office 24 October 2009 – 24 October 2015
- Preceded by: Edgar Cheng
- Succeeded by: Norman Leung

Chairman of The Hongkong and Shanghai Banking Corporation Limited
- In office 25 May 2005 – 1 Feb 2010
- Preceded by: David Gordon Eldon
- Succeeded by: Michael Geoghegan

Unofficial Member of the Legislative Council
- In office 1991–1995
- Appointed by: Sir David Wilson

Personal details
- Born: 16 July 1948 Hong Kong
- Died: 28 August 2022 (aged 74)
- Education: Kowloon Technical School; Chinese University of Hong Kong; University of Auckland

Vincent Cheng Hoi-Chuen
- Traditional Chinese: 鄭海泉
- Simplified Chinese: 郑海泉
Transcriptions
Standard Mandarin
- Hanyu Pinyin: Zhèng Hǎiquán
- Wade–Giles: Cheng Hai-ch'üan
- IPA: [ʈʂə̂ŋ xàɪtɕʰɥɛ̌n]
Yue: Cantonese
- Yale Romanization: Jehng Hoí Chyùhn
- Jyutping: Zeng^{6} Hoi^{2}cyun^{4}
- IPA: [tsɛ̀ːŋ hɔ̌ːi tɕʰy̏ːn]

Vincent Cheng Hoi-Chuen GBS OBE JP (Chinese: 鄭海泉, 16 July 1948 – 28 August 2022) was a Hong Kong banker who was an executive director of HSBC Holdings plc. He was also chairman of The Hongkong and Shanghai Banking Corporation Limited, the Asia-Pacific branch of HSBC, and founding member of the group, from 2005 to 2010.

== Early years and education ==
Cheng grew up in a poor family of six, despite difficult circumstances and having been crippled by polio at a young age. He was educated in Hong Kong and in New Zealand, receiving his Bachelor of Social Science in Economics from the Chinese University of Hong Kong (CUHK) and a Master of Philosophy in Economics from the University of Auckland.

== Career ==
Cheng joined The Hongkong and Shanghai Banking Corporation in 1978, when he worked in the Group Finance department. In 1982 he moved to the Bank's Group Planning department, before he was appointed Chief Economist in 1986. From April 1989 to April 1991, he was seconded to the Hong Kong Government's Central Policy Unit and acted as an adviser to the Governor of Hong Kong. He took up the post of general manager in June 1995 and then the first ethnic Chinese Executive Director of the Bank in November that same year.

He was appointed vice-chairman and Chief Executive of Hang Seng Bank, a bank which The Hongkong and Shanghai Banking Corporation holds majority stake, in 1998. On 25 May 2005, he became Chairman of The Hongkong and Shanghai Banking Corporation, taking over from David Eldon. He also became the managing director of HSBC Group and the Director of HSBC Bank Australia Limited. On 1 April 2007, he became Chairman of the HSBC Bank (China) Company Limited. He has also been appointed the first ethnic Chinese Executive Director of HSBC Holdings on 1 February 2008.

In January 2008, he was appointed a member of the National Committee of the 11th Chinese People's Political Consultative Conference (CPPCC), and a senior advisor to the 11th Beijing Municipal Committee of the CPPCC.

His previous government advisory roles have included Member of the Executive Council from 1995 to 1997 and a Hong Kong Affairs Adviser to the People's Republic of China from 1994 to 1997.

He was also a member of the Legislative Council of Hong Kong from 1991 to 1995.

His public service duties included serving as Chairman of the Standing Committee on Directorate Salaries and Conditions of Service for the Government of the Hong Kong Special Administrative Region and Member of the Exchange Fund Advisory Committee of the Hong Kong Monetary Authority. He was also Honorary President of the Hong Kong Society for Rehabilitation.

On August 28, 2022, Vincent CHENG died at the age of 74 at the Happy Valley Sanatorium and Hospital, with media reports suggesting that he had suffered from nasopharyngeal cancer before his death.

On September 21, 2022, the repose service of Mr. Cheng was held at St. John's Cathedral of the Sheng Kung Hui, supported by the Financial Secretary Mr. Paul Chan Mo-po, Executive Council member Mr. Moses Cheng Mo-chi, and the Vice-Chancellor of The Chinese University of Hong Kong Mr. and Mrs. Duan Chongzhi. Former Chief Executive Mr. and Mrs. Donald Tsang, Liberal Party Legislative Councillor Tommy Cheung, and Pragmatic Round Table Legislative Councillor Michael Tien were present to pay homage.

Cheng had been appointed the Justice of the Peace, Officer of the Most Excellent Order of the British Empire (OBE) (1994), and Gold Bauhinia Star (GBS) (2005).

== Death ==
Cheng died on the night of 28 August 2022, aged 74.

Academic offices
Preceded by Dr Edgar W.K. Cheng	Chairman of the Council of the Chinese University of Hong Kong; 2009–2015	Succeeded by TBA
Order of precedence
Preceded by Yeoh Eng-kiong; Recipients of the Gold Bauhinia Star	Hong Kong order of precedence Recipients of the Gold Bauhinia Star	Succeeded by Eric Charles Barnes; Recipients of the Gold Bauhinia Star
