= Yau Yue Commercial Bank =

Yau Yue Commercial Bank (Chinese: 有餘銀行) was a bank in Hong Kong.

== Background ==
The bank was founded in 1953. In the banking crisis of 1965, bank runs occurred in several small and medium-sized banks. In 1966, the British Hong Kong government asked The Hongkong and Shanghai Banking Corporation to take over the bank. The bank was bankrupted in 1969.
