= Stuart Gulliver =

British banker

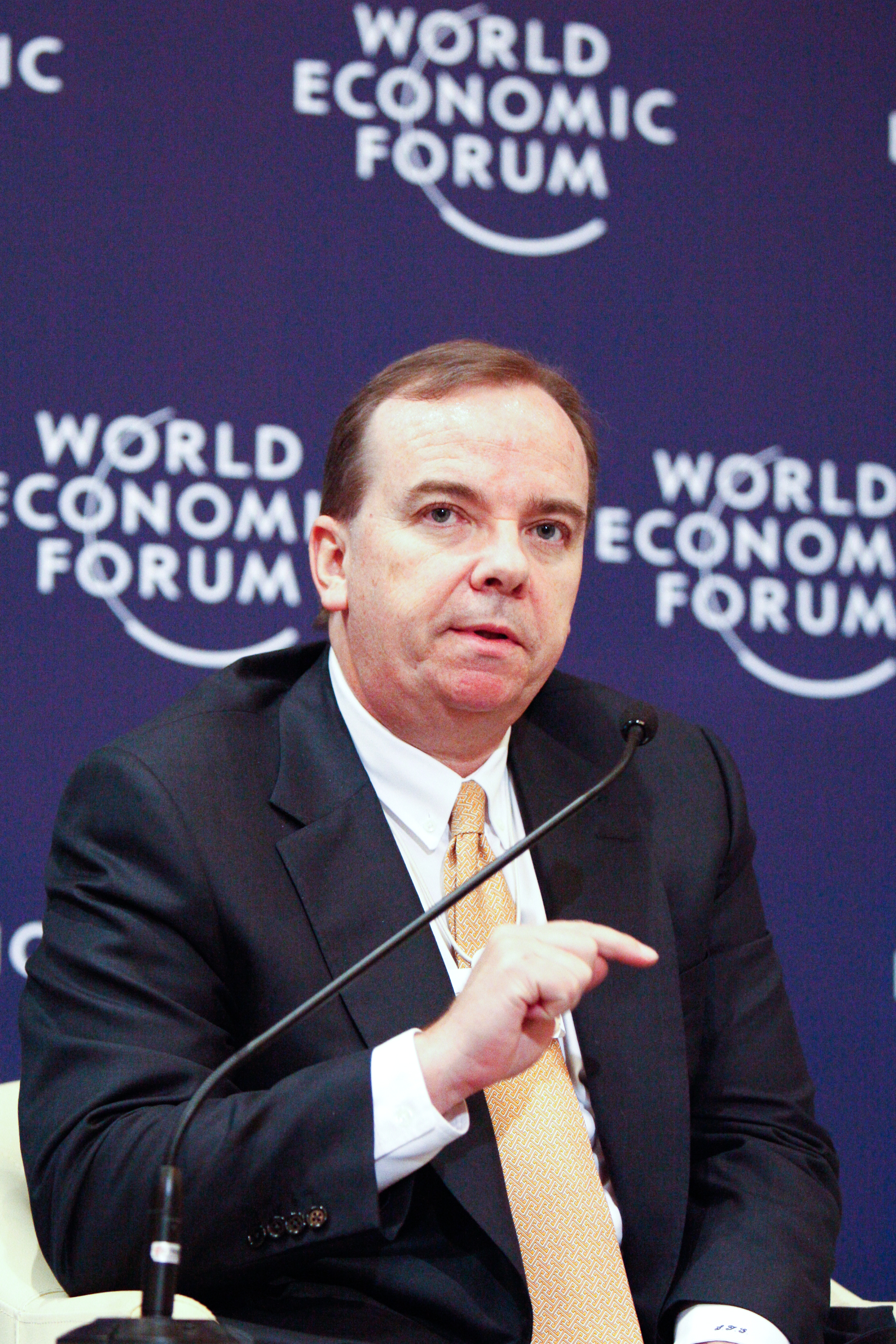
- Stuart Gulliver at the World Economic Forum on East Asia 2011, Jakarta, Indonesia
- Born: 9 March 1959 (age 67); Derby, England
- Education: Oxford University (M.J.)
- Occupation: Banker
- Years active: 1980–present
- Title: Former CEO, HSBC
- Term: 2010-18
- Successor: John Flint
- Spouse: Amanda "Mandy" Henricks
- Children: 3 (with first wife)

Stuart Thomson Gulliver (born 9 March 1959) is a British banker, and the former group chief executive of HSBC. He was succeeded on 21 February 2018 by John Flint.

== Early life and education ==
He was born in Derby, England, in 1959. His father Philip was a legal executive, while his mother Jean was personal assistant to the senior engineer at a local dockyard. Gulliver went to grammar school in Plymouth, Devon.

Gulliver was an avid boxer while at Worcester College, Oxford, where he received a degree in jurisprudence (law). In a 2011 interview to Financial Times, Gulliver recalls his humble upbringing and his childhood aspiration, and said: "I wanted to be a barrister, but my parents couldn’t afford it".

== Professional career ==
=== Early career and HSBC (1980–2010) ===
In 1980, an HSBC executive serving in India urged him to join HSBC's elite international officer programme, as it was called at that time, which paved the way for his banking career. Gulliver worked his way up in treasury and capital markets divisions, rose through the ranks in the bank's Global banking and markets division, and held a number of key roles in the group's operations worldwide; including postings in London, Hong Kong, Tokyo, Kuala Lumpur and the United Arab Emirates.

Gulliver was appointed to run the Asian and treasury capital markets desks from Hong Kong in the mid 1990s. During the 1990s, Gulliver built HSBC's investment banking business in Hong Kong and turned HSBC's Asian markets business into one of the group's major money-spinners, even in the aftermath of the Asian financial crisis. He served as the head of treasury and capital markets in Asia-Pacific from 1996 to 2012.

He was appointed a group general manager in 2000, and later he led the global markets division from 2002 to 2003. He moved back to London in early 2003 to co-head the group's global corporate, investment banking and markets division along with John Studzinski. In March 2004, he joined the group management board as a group managing director. Upon the departure of John Studzinski in 2006, he was appointed chief executive of global banking and markets and HSBC Global Asset Management in May 2006.

He was a director of HSBC North America Holdings Inc until May 2009; of HSBC Bank Middle East Ltd from February 2010 to May 2011; of HSBC Latin America Holdings (UK) Limited until December 2009.

He is deputy chairman of the supervisory committee of HSBC Trinkaus & Burkhardt AG (since September 2007; member since May 2006); non-executive chairman and a director of HSBC France since January 2009; and chairman of HSBC Private Banking Holdings (Suisse) SA since February 2010 (Director since September 2007).

He was made a director of The Hongkong and Shanghai Banking Corporation Limited in September 2006 and has been an executive director of HSBC Holdings plc since May 2008.

=== Group CEO of HSBC (2010–2018) ===
On 7 September 2010, Stephen Green, the then group chairman of HSBC, announced that he would step down, in order to accept the invitation of the UK Prime Minister to become Minister of State for Trade and Investment in January 2011. As a result of Stephen Green's decision to step down earlier than planned, Michael Geoghegan, the then group CEO of HSBC, announced his retirement and Stuart Gulliver, who led HSBC's investment-banking division since 2006, was appointed as the new Group CEO of HSBC Holdings plc, effective 1 January 2011.

He was also appointed the chairman of The Hongkong and Shanghai Banking Corporation Limited, a wholly owned subsidiary of HSBC Holdings plc.

In 2011, he was included in the 50 Most Influential ranking of Bloomberg Markets.

In 2014, he received a total of £7.6 million in pay and bonuses.

In October 2017, it was announced that he will be succeeded in February 2018 by John Flint.

== Personal life ==
His primary residence is in Kensington in West London, where he lives with his Australian-born second wife, Amanda "Mandy" Henricks. He has three children from his first marriage. He officially lives in Hong Kong.

A 2017 tax tribunal case shows HMRC agreed that by 2002/2003 Gulliver had become non-domiciled by establishing a domicile of choice in Hong Kong, despite having returned to be resident in the UK again, for what was intended to be a period of two years. In 2015, HMRC opened an enquiry into his domicile status, since he had in fact remained UK resident.

The Guardian newspaper reported that Gulliver was a client of the scandal-ridden Panamanian lawfirm Mossack Fonseca, investing bonus payments through them.

Business positions
Preceded by Michael Geoghegan	Group Chief Executive of HSBC Group; 2010–2018	Succeeded by John Flint
