= David Eldon =

Chairman of the Hong Kong General Chamber of Commerce
- In office 24 April 2005 – 3 May 2007
- Preceded by: Anthony John Liddell Nightingale
- Succeeded by: Lily Chiang

Chairman of the Hongkong and Shanghai Banking Corporation Limited
- In office 1999 – 24 May 2005
- Preceded by: John Estmond Strickland
- Succeeded by: Vincent Cheng

Chairman of the Hang Seng Bank Limited
- In office 1 January 1998 – 21 April 2005
- Preceded by: Lee Quo-wei
- Succeeded by: Michael Roger Pearson Smith

Personal details
- Born: 14 October 1945 (age 80)
- Spouse: Maria Margarita Eldon

David Gordon Eldon CBE (Chinese: 艾爾敦, born 1945) is the former chairman of The Hongkong and Shanghai Banking Corporation Limited. He retired in May 2005, after spending 37 years with HSBC Group, but made a return to banking in 2011 as non-executive chairman of HSBC Bank Middle East Limited. He stepped down from the role on April 30, 2021 and served as non-executive deputy chairman of The Hongkong and Shanghai Banking Corporation from June 2021 to June 2026. He has now accepted the role as Adviser to the Board.

== Career ==
Eldon commenced a career in banking with an Australian banking group in London in 1964, and joined The British Bank of the Middle East (now HSBC Bank Middle East Limited) in 1968. In January that year he took up his first position in Dubai, remaining in the Middle East undertaking a variety of roles in different countries. He was appointed Manager of Sharjah branch in 1973 and Manager of Ras Al Khaimah branch in 1977.

He took up his first position in Hong Kong in 1979 as Manager Special Projects in the head office of The Hongkong and Shanghai Banking Corporation. He later became a District Manager, with responsibility for the Bank's branches in Mongkok.

Eldon was appointed Deputy managing director of The Saudi British Bank (SABB) in 1984 and returned to Hong Kong in 1987, when he took up the position of Senior Manager (International Corporate Accounts). At the end of 1988, he was appointed chief executive officer in Malaysia, and was promoted to general manager in 1990. He returned to Hong Kong again in 1992 and later became general manager in The Hongkong and Shanghai Banking Corporation's International department.

He became an Executive Director of The Hongkong and Shanghai Banking Corporation in 1994 and chief executive officer of the Bank in January 1996. In January 1999, he was appointed Chairman of The Hongkong and Shanghai Banking Corporation and the Executive Director of HSBC Holdings.

Eldon retired in 2005, but made a return to banking in 2011 as non-executive chairman of HSBC Bank Middle East Limited. He stepped down from the role on April 30, 2021 and was then appointed non-executive Deputy Chairman of The Hongkong and Shanghai Banking Corporation in June 2021. He served in this role until stepping down in June 2026, at which point he accepted the role of Adviser to the Board.

Eldon was the non-executive chairman of HSBC Bank Egypt and HSBC Bank Turkey A.S., roles to which he was appointed in 2017, and retired from both during 2021. He was non-executive chairman of HSBC Bank Oman between 2013 and 2017 and he has been Adviser to the CEO of HSBC's Global Commercial Bank since 2016.

Other positions held by Eldon during his career include non-executive chairman of Hang Seng Bank Limited, a director of HSBC Bank Australia Limited (formerly Hongkong Bank of Australia Limited), a director of the MTR Corporation, a director of Swire Pacific Limited, deputy chairman of The Hong Kong Jockey Club, chairman of the Hong Kong General Chamber of Commerce and chairman of the Dubai International Financial Centre Authority. He was a member of the Presidential Committee for National Competitiveness of President of South Korea Lee Myung-bak and a senior adviser to PricewaterhouseCoopers in Hong Kong and China from September 2005 until 2014.

From January 2016 to December 2022, he served as non-executive chairman of Octopus Holdings Limited, Octopus Cards Limited and Octopus Cards Client Funds Limited. During his seven-year tenure, Eldon steered the digital transformation of the home-grown Hong Kong company, fast-tracking online and mobile strategies as well as spearheading product diversification with the aim of deepening market penetration.

Eldon also sits on a number of other boards, advisory boards and Hong Kong Government entities.

== Blog ==
Eldon maintains a blog, where he gives (sometimes controversial) opinions on political topics. In 2014, Eldon attracted attention after posting comments about Hong Kong’s Chief Executive Leung Chun-ying, and saying that pro-democracy protesters should "move on from the current impasse" during the 2014 Hong Kong protests. This had led to HSBC feeling the need to comment that the views expressed were his own, and not a company view on the matters.

== Personal life ==
Born in Inverness, Scotland, Eldon was educated at the Duke of York's Royal Military School. Eldon married in 1975 and has three children. Two of his children are living and working in Hong Kong, while the other lives and works in Canberra, Australia. Eldon continues to live in Hong Kong, where he has spent more than half his working life, and he intends to remain in Hong Kong.

== Honours ==
- Fellow of the Chartered Institute of Bankers
- Fellow of the Hong Kong Institute of Bankers
- Justice of the Peace (2000)
- Honorary Doctor of Business Administration of the City University of Hong Kong (November 2003)
- DHL/SCMP Hong Kong Business Person of the Year for 2003
- Gold Bauhinia Star (GBS) (2004)
- Commander of the Order of the British Empire (CBE) (2005)
- Asian Banker Lifetime Achievement Award (2005)
- Honorary Citizenship of Seoul
- Honorary Doctor of the Hong Kong Academy for Performing Arts (2011)

Order of precedence
Preceded by Kenneth Fang; Recipients of the Gold Bauhinia Star	Hong Kong order of precedence Recipients of the Gold Bauhinia Star	Succeeded by Michael Sze; Recipients of the Gold Bauhinia Star
