= Blind Education and Rehabilitation Development Organisation =

Disability organization based in Bangladesh

- Founded: 1991
- Type: Non-profit; NGO
- Location: Dhaka, Bangladesh
- Website: berdo-bd.org

Blind Education and Rehabilitation Development Organisation (BERDO) is a nonprofit non-governmental organization which works to empower people with disabilities through programs such as microcredit financing and education.

== Organization ==
The executive director of BERDO, MD.Saidul Huq, called for "creating an environment where the people with disability can enjoy life with dignity" in 2005. Its microcredit program is aimed at supporting people with physical disabilities and is one of its main support programs. It also tries to support education initiatives for people with disabilities; the organization recently partnered with the Hongkong and Shanghai Banking Corporation to give scholarships to people with blindness. BERDO also created a "talking library" to support education initiatives for blind people so they can continue on with school despite a lack of braille textbooks; the library holds hundreds of book on cassette tape so people who are blind can listen to them. To help create more access to braille texts, BERDO helped to create and test a Bengali-to-braille software translator that will help to create braille books at 20% of the cost. According to BERDO, there are 2,000,000 people in Bangladesh suffering from some sort of eye disability.

BERDO often attracts government ministers to its events celebrating the rights of people with disabilities in Bangladesh. Its 20th anniversary celebration brought a number of ministry leaders of Bangladesh to speak as guests.
