= John Gray (British banker) =

John Malcolm Gray, CBE (28 July 1934 - 19 November 2009) was a Scottish businessman and the former chairman and chief executive of the Hongkong and Shanghai Banking Corporation in Hong Kong from 1993 until his retirement in 1996. He was the third generation of his family to work for the organisation. Gray was appointed a Commander of the Order of the British Empire in 1996.

== Background ==
John Malcolm Gray was born in Hong Kong on 28 July 1934. At the beginning of the Second World War, Samuel Gray, his father, was manager of the bank in Calcutta. He sent his family to Australia for safety. Gray was educated in Australia and at Strathallan School in Perthshire, Scotland.

Gray's family connection with the HSBC began in 1883 when his great uncle joined the Hongkong Bank serving as its agent in Hankow. His father joined the bank in 1914 and his great uncle in 1920, all of whom would become bank managers.

== Career ==
Gray joined the London branch of the bank as a trainee in 1952 before moving out to Hong Kong in 1956. Further postings with the bank led him to India, Malaysia, Brunei, France and Germany. In 1979 Gray was appointed as chief accountant closely followed by several promotions in the early eighties to executive director and subsequently deputy chairman of the bank. During this time he also served as chairman of James Capel, the newly acquired stockbroking arm of the organisation. In 1992 he was appointed a director of the recently founded HSBC Holdings in London.

== Further appointments ==
- Member of the Executive Council of Hong Kong;
- Chairman of the Hong Kong Port Development Board;
- Chairman of the Hong Kong Club;
- Deputy chairman of Harvey Nichols;
- Director of the World Maritime shipping group;
- Appointed a CBE in 1996.

== Awards ==
- Friendship Award (China) 2016
