= Peter Wong (banker) =

Hong Kong banker

Peter Wong Tung-shun

Personal details
- Spouse: Yan Junqi
- Children: Julia Wong
- Occupation: Group Managing Director, HSBC Group; Deputy Chairman and Chief Executive, The Hongkong and Shanghai Banking Corporation Limited

Peter Wong Tung-shun, Justice of the Peace (born November 1951, in British Hong Kong) is a Hong Kong banker associated with the HSBC, StanChart and Citi. He retired as CEO of HSBC Asia-Pacific and became non-executive chairman of The Hongkong and Shanghai Banking Corporation, effective 7 June 2021. He holds a BComm degree from the University of Calgary in Alberta, Canada, a master's degree in marketing and finance in 1976 from Indiana University School of Business and a master's degree in computer science in 1979 from Indiana University Bloomington in the United States.

He is one of the 124 members of Hong Kong's delegation to the Chinese People's Political Consultative Conference.

== Biography Of Wong ==
- 1980: Joined Citibank and served as Deputy Financial Controller, Director of Business Development, Assistant Managing Director and Director of Banking Business.
- 1996: Appointed as the Director of Operating, Services, and Sales for North Asia of Citibank
- 1997: Joined Standard Chartered Bank and served as Director of Personal Banking for Hong Kong and China
- 2000: Appointed as Chief Executive for Hong Kong of Standard Chartered Bank
- 2002: Appointed as Director of Greater China of Standard Chartered Bank
- 2005: Joined HSBC and served as General Manager of HSBC Group and an executive director of The Hongkong and Shanghai Banking Corporation
- 2010: Appointed as the first Chinese - Asia Pacific CEO of The Hongkong and Shanghai Banking Corporation

In 2020, in a highly symbolic act that ended the bank's previous political neutrality, Wong signed a public petition supporting the Chinese leadership's creation of a far-reaching national security law for Hong Kong. The move was understood as politically necessary to avoid punitive action against the bank by Beijing but drew widespread international and local Hong Kong criticism.
