= Torre Diana =

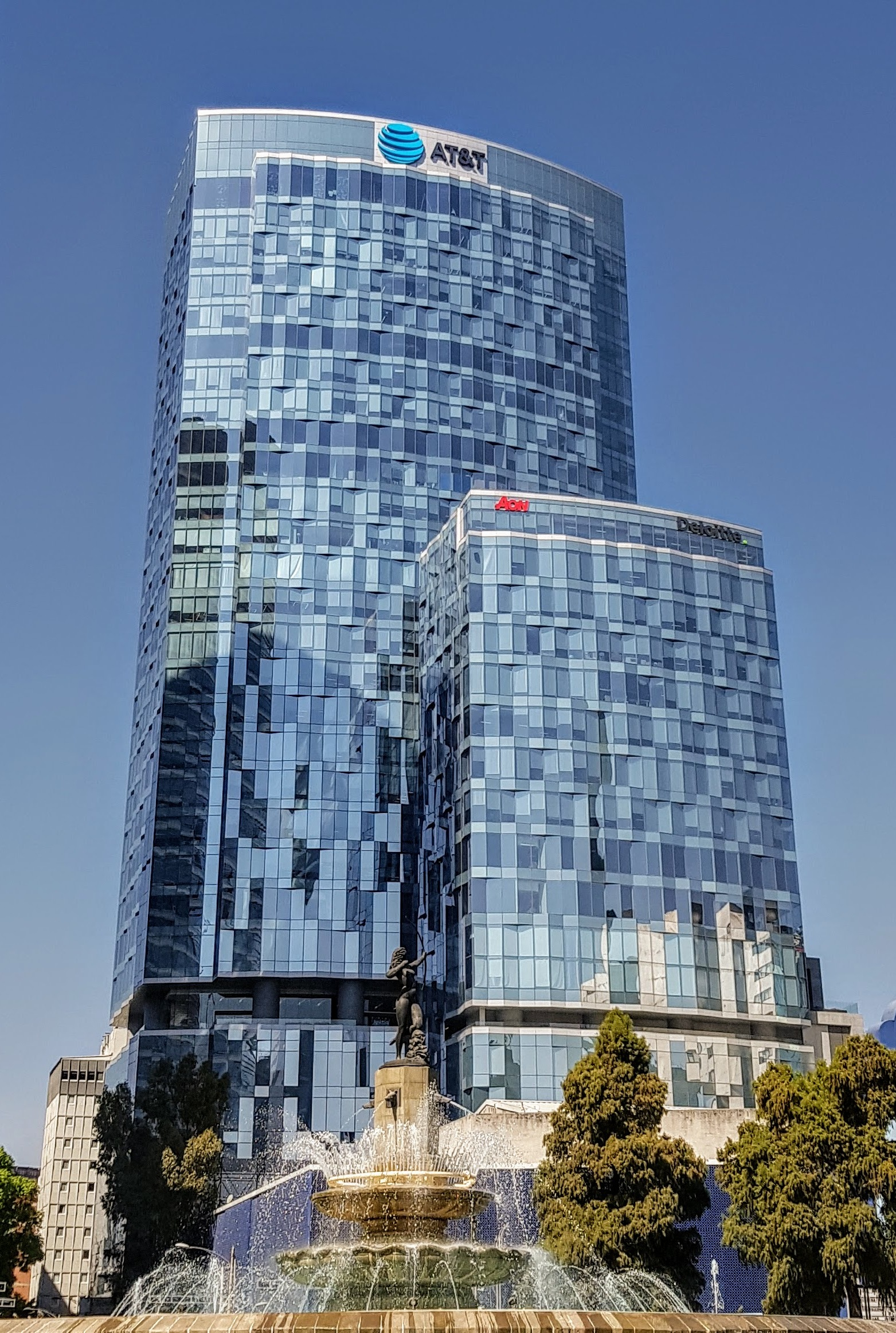
- Torre Diana

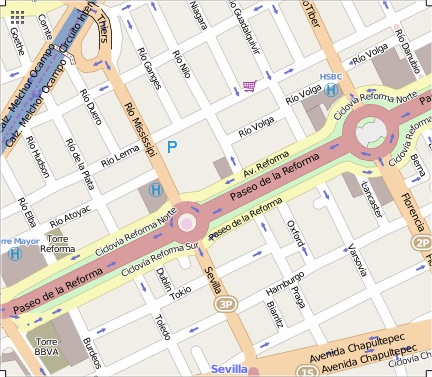
- Location within Mexico City Reforma Angel to Diana

General information
- Status: Completed
- Type: Office
- Location: Río Lerma street #232. at Río Misisiṕi st., Colonia Cuauhtémoc, Cuauhtémoc borough, Mexico City, Mexico
- Coordinates: 19.42667°N 99.17206°W
- Construction started: April 2013
- Completed: 2016
- Cost: USD 165,000,000
- Client: Paul Reichmann, Fibra Uno and the Farca/Salame Trust

Height
- Height: 158 metres (518 ft)

Technical details
- Floor count: 33
- Grounds: 6,243 square metres (67,200 sq ft)

References
- "Invertirá Fibra Uno 50 mdd" ("Fibra Uno will invest 50 million dollars"), Reforma, 2013-05-04, Official website

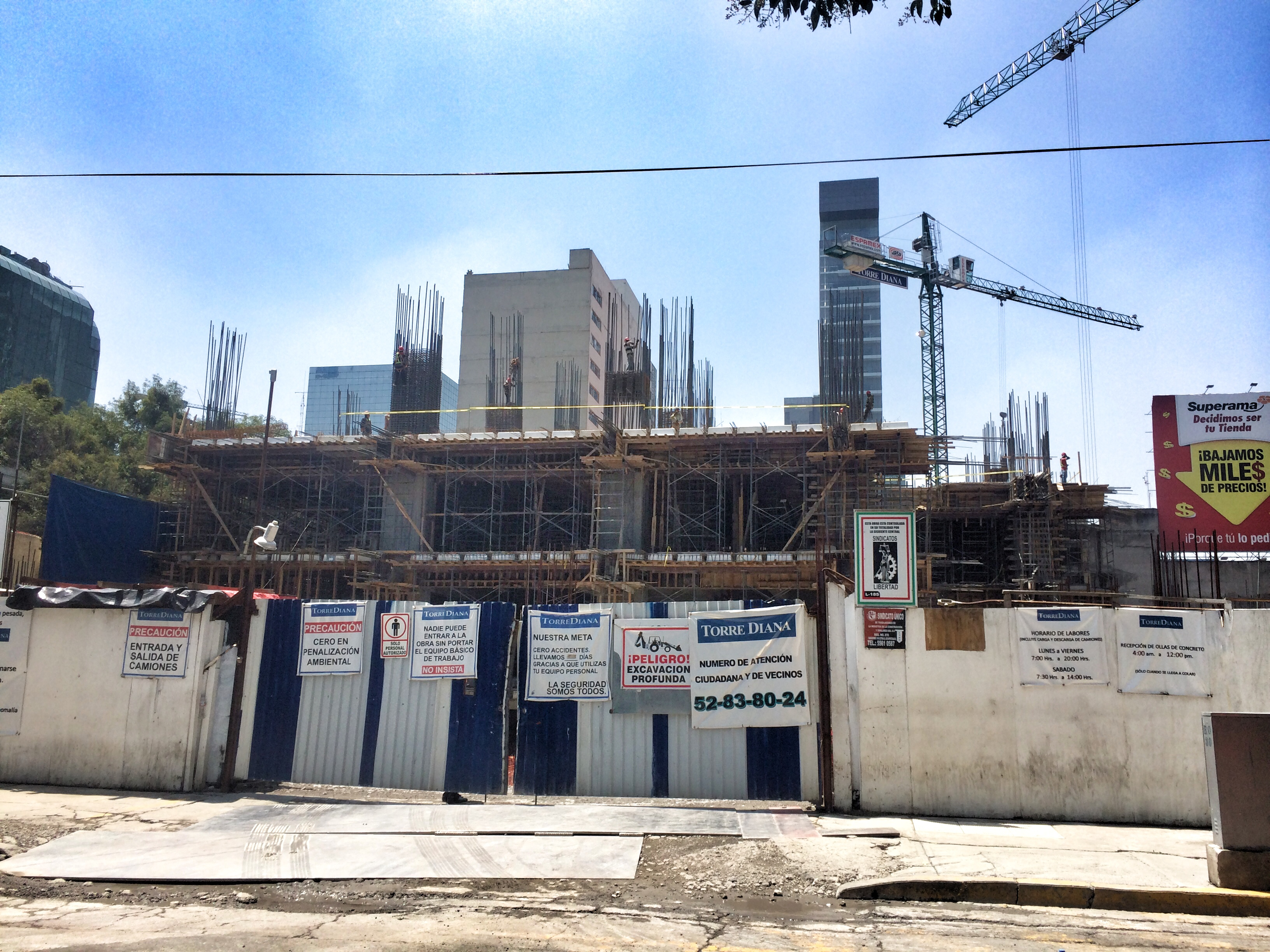
Construction, late July 2014

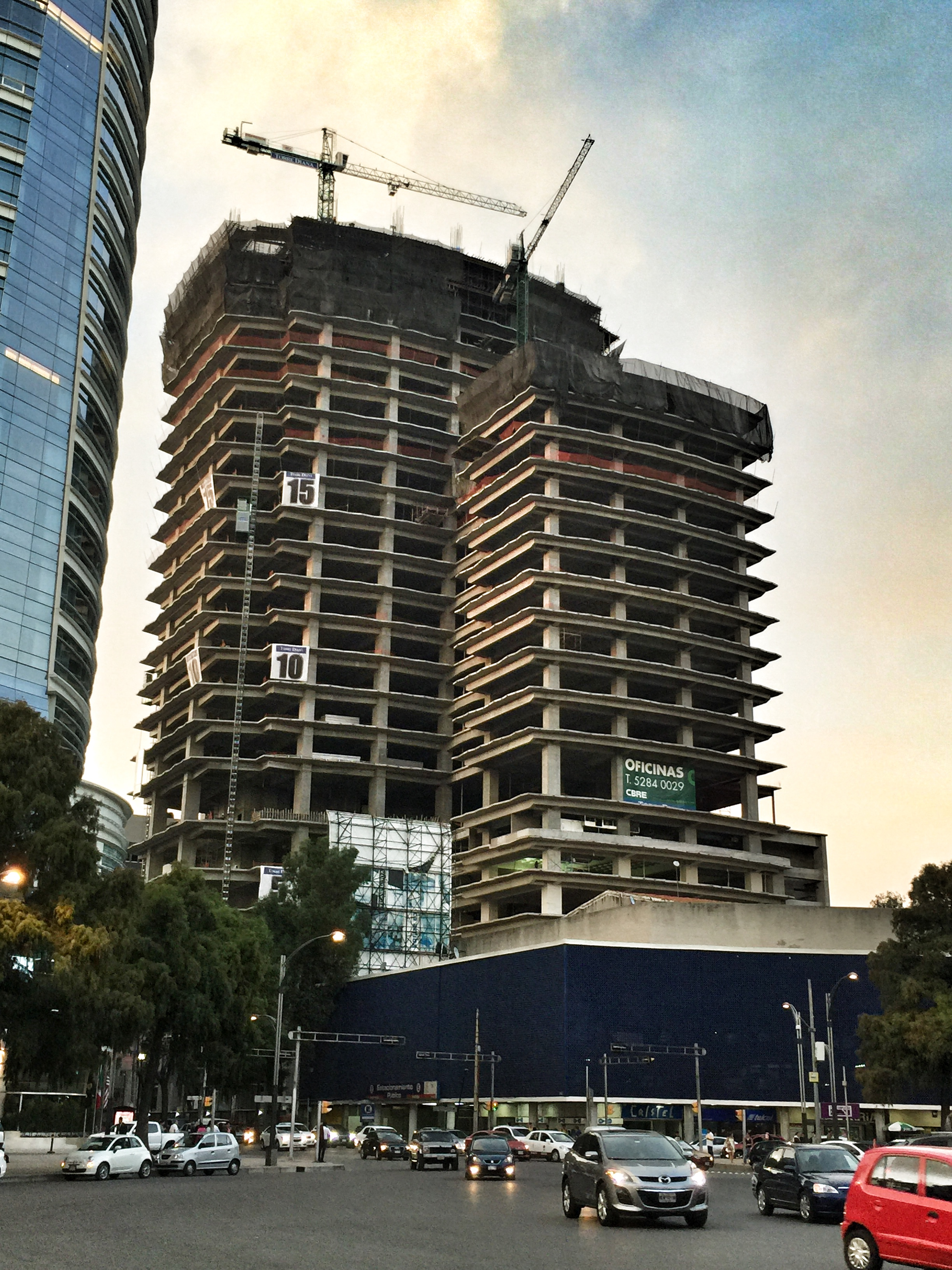
Under construction, end Feb. 2015

The Torre Diana ("Diana Tower") is a 33-story, 158-metre (518 ft) office skyscraper at Río Lerma street #232, at the corner of Río Misisipí, just off the city's iconic boulevard, Paseo de la Reforma in the Colonia Cuauhtémoc neighborhood near the Diana the Huntress fountain.
