= HSBC Tower, Mexico City =

Skyscraper in Mexico City, Mexico

HSBC Tower
- Torre HSBC
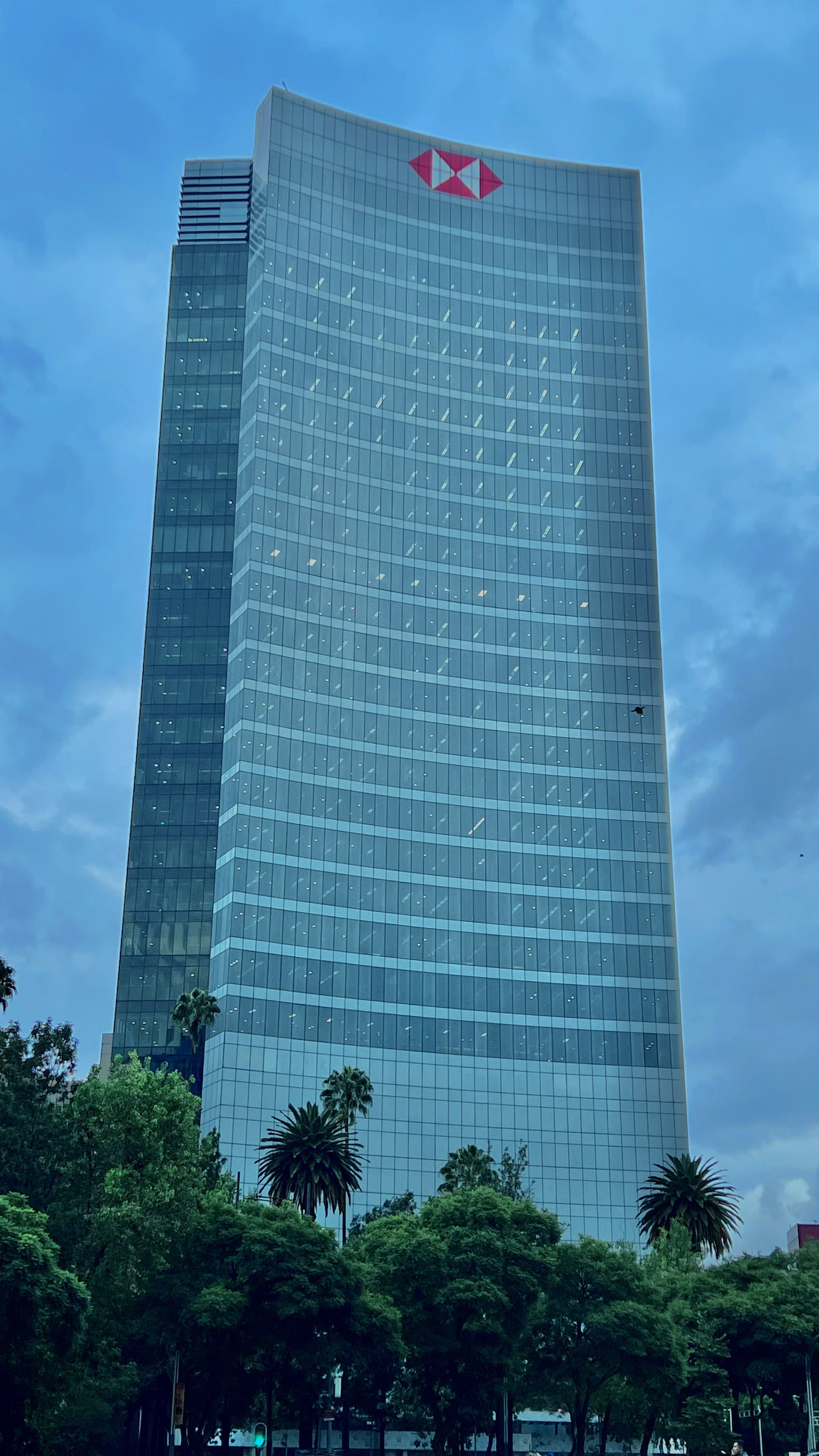
- In 2022
- Interactive map of the HSBC Tower area

General information
- Location: Paseo de la Reforma, Mexico City, Mexico
- Coordinates: 19.4278°N 99.1686°W
- Construction started: 2002
- Completed: 2006
- Cost: US$150 million

Height
- Roof: 136 m (446 ft)

Technical details
- Floor count: 36
- Floor area: 430,000 square feet (40,000 m^{2}).
- Lifts/elevators: 18

HSBC Tower (Spanish: Torre HSBC) is a skyscraper office building located on Paseo de la Reforma in Colonia Cuauhtémoc, Cuauhtémoc, Mexico City, Mexico, which is the headquarters of HSBC Mexico. It is located opposite the Angel of Independence, and is home to the around 2,800 HSBC Mexico staff. Construction was completed in 2006, at a cost of around US$150 million. There are 23 office floors and 12 parking levels in the 136-metre-high (446 ft) tower, which is one of the tallest in Mexico City.

The HSBC Tower is the first of its type of environmentally friendly buildings in Latin America. It was the first in Latin America to be given LEED (Leadership in Energy and Environmental Design) gold certification from the US Green Building Council.

== Opening ==
The inauguration of the new head office took place on 5 April 2006, attended by President of Mexico Vicente Fox Quesada, the President's wife Marta Sahagún, Secretary of Finance Francisco Gil Diaz, Banco de México Guillermo Ortiz Martínez, HSBC Mexico CEO Sandy Flockhart, HSBC Group Chief Executive Stephen Green, HSBC Group Chairman Sir John Bond and Deputy Chairman and senior non-executive Director Baroness Dunn.

== Notable features ==
HSBC's environmental principles mean that the building has been designed from the start to include the best available technology to reduce the consumption of water and electricity, including low consumption bathroom furniture, waterless urinals, rain collection, water treatment plant and efficient use of non-drinkable water. HSBC claim that the building will consume 55% less water and 40% less energy than comparable structures.

=== Credit Transforms to Mexico ===
Credit Transforms to Mexico is a mural which was unveiled by President Fox and Sandy Flockhart in the reception area of the building.

=== Stephen and Stitt ===
In common with other HSBC head office buildings, the HSBC Tower has a pair of bronze lions guarding the main entrance. These are copies of those which have stood outside the HSBC Hong Kong headquarters building at 1 Queen's Road Central since 1935.

== See also ==
- HSBC
- A list of other towers named HSBC Tower
