= Colonia Cuauhtémoc, Mexico City =

Neighborhood in Mexico City, Mexico

Coordinates: 19°25′50.95″N 99°10′9.45″W

Cuauhtémoc
- Neighborhood of Mexico City
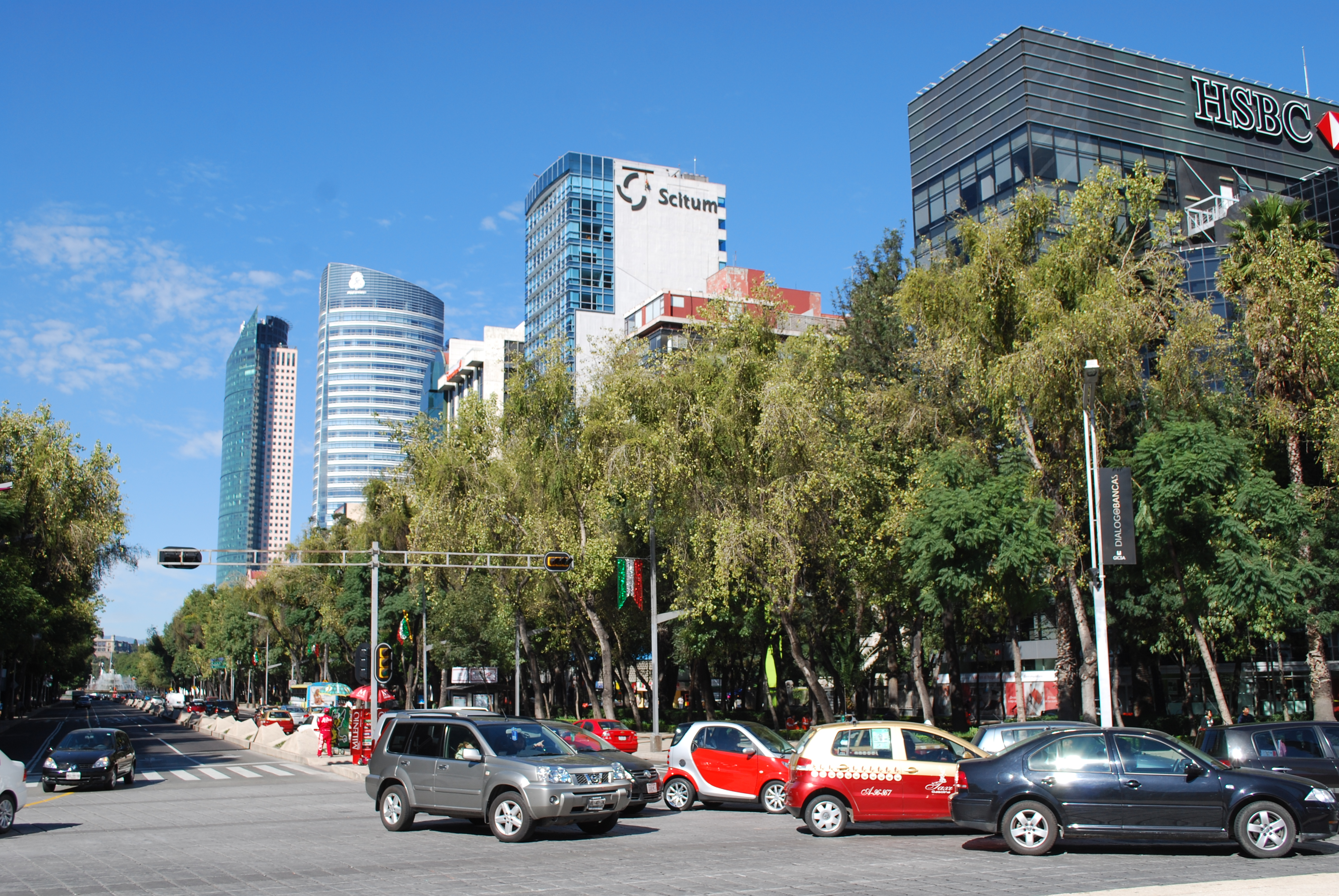
- Skyscrapers along Paseo de la Reforma in the colonia

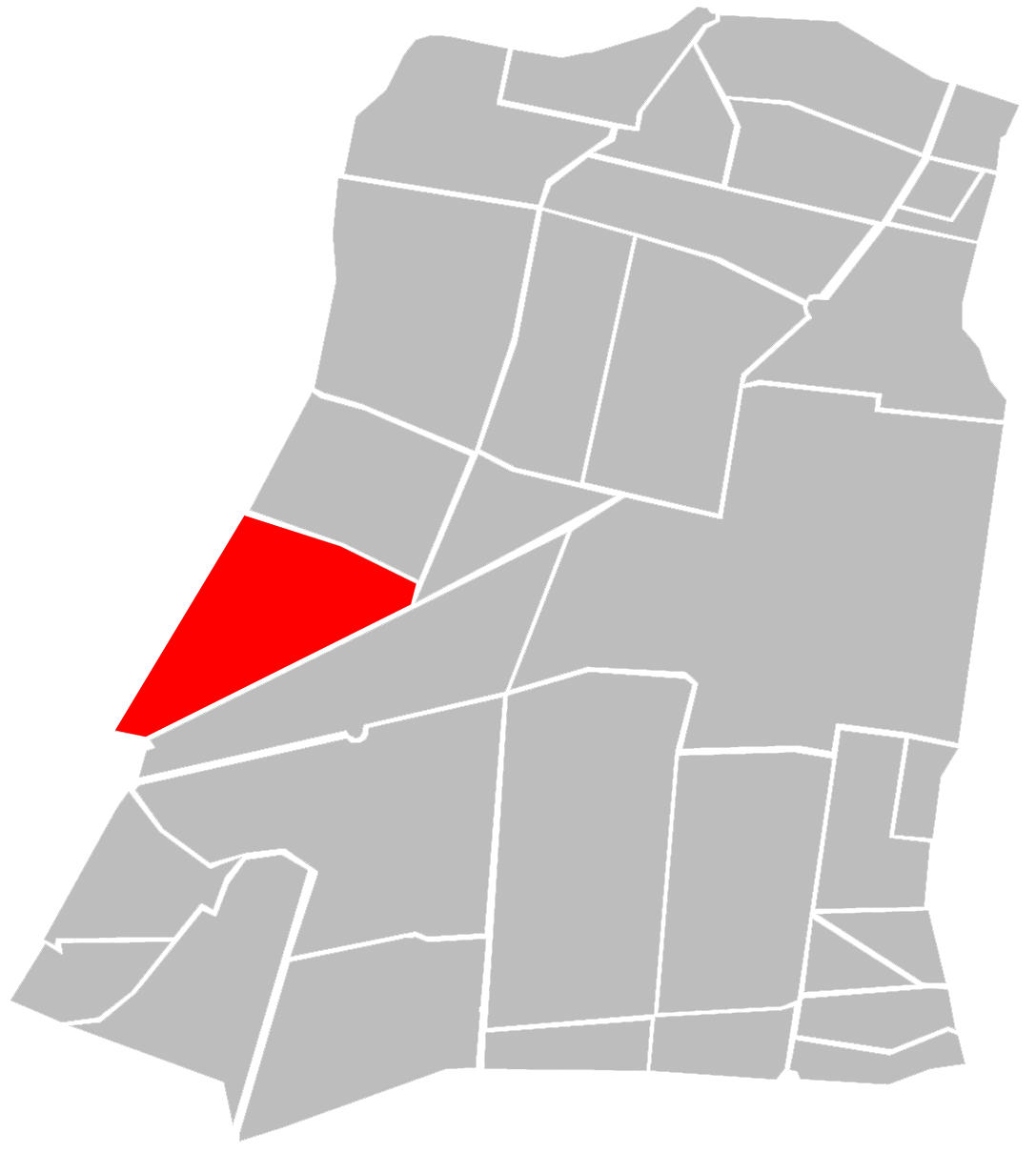
- Location of Colonia Cuauhtémoc (in red) within Cuauhtémoc borough
- Country: Mexico
- City: Mexico City
- Borough: Cuauhtémoc

Population (2010)
  - Total: 11,399
- Postal code: 06500

Colonia Cuauhtémoc is a colonia (official neighborhood) in the Cuauhtémoc municipality of central Mexico City. It is located just north of Paseo de la Reforma, west of the historic center of Mexico City.

The colonia was created in the late 19th century after some false starts, and is named after the Monument to Cuauhtémoc which is a nearby landmark on Paseo de la Reforma. Actions taken by residents have ensured that the area remains mostly residential, with commercial development limited to the strip along Paseo de la Reforma. This strip includes a number of important buildings such as the Mexican Stock Exchange, the Torre Mayor, the Torre HSBC, the British Embassy, and the United States Embassy.

== Location ==
The neighborhood is bordered by:

- James Sullivan street on the northeast, across which is Colonia San Rafael
- Circuito Interior Melchor Ocampo on the west, across which is Colonia Anzures
- Paseo de la Reforma on the south, across which is Colonia Juárez

== Description ==
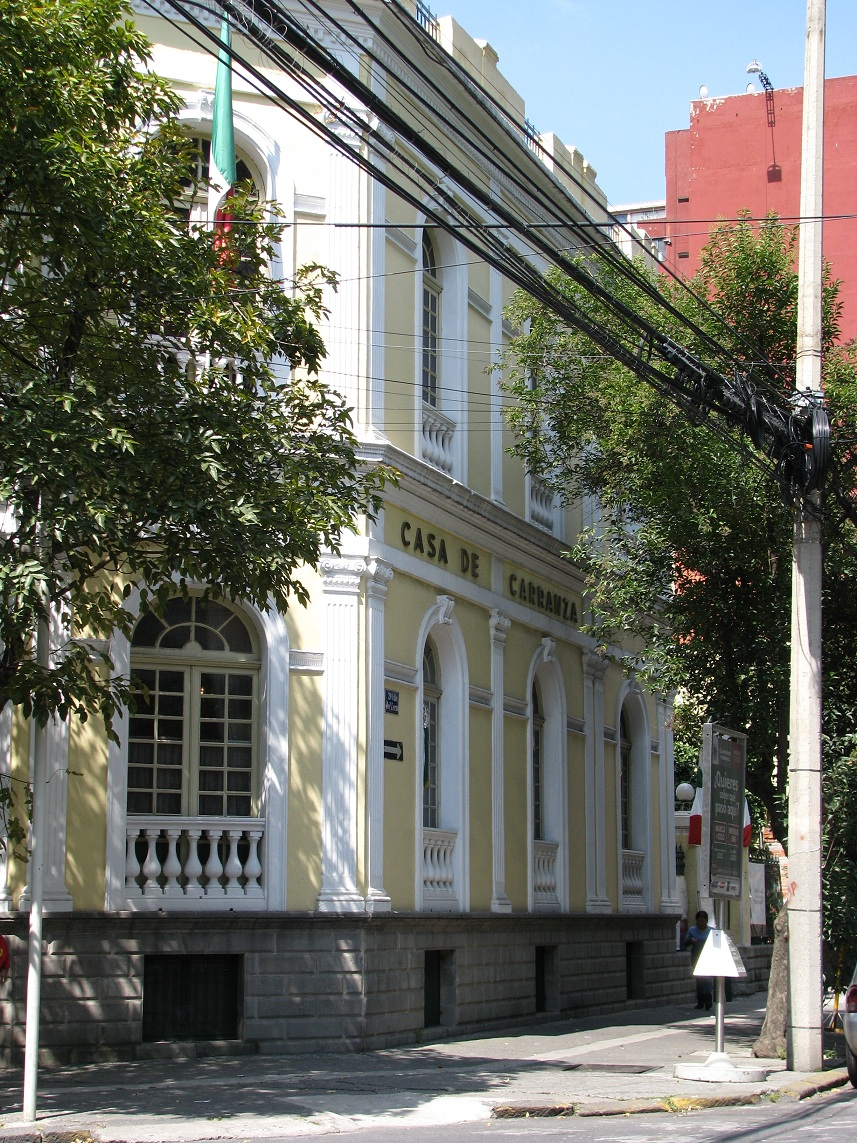
This Porfirian-era mansion was the last residence of President Venustiano Carranza before his assassination. It later hosted the Embassy of France and afterwards the Embassy of El Salvador. Since 1961 the building houses the Museo Casa de Carranza.

The colonia is just west of the historic center of the city, bordered by the following streets: Calzada Manuel Villalogín in the north, Paseo de la Reforma to the south and east and Avenida Melchor Ocampo in the west. It is still mostly residential, with development limited to the strip right along Paseo de la Reforma. It has just under 10,000 residents, on its 2,700 pieces of private property stretching over 90 blocks. Public schools in the colonia include Cendi Gdf Tsj Cristina Pachecho (primary), Cendi IMSS 35 Tipo B (primary), Cendi IMSS 46 Tipo B (primary), Cendi IMSS 52 (primary), Cendi Part Colegio Cibeles, S.C., (primary), Cendi Part Colegio del Angel (primary) and Colegio Reina Maria (technical school). Private schools in the colonia include Alitas (preschool), Busy Children (preschool), Centro Educativo Best, (high school), Colegio Colbert (secondary), Colegio Nueva Infancia (secondary), Colegio Reina Maria (secondary), Nihao-chop (language school) and Escuela Inglesa Kent (secondary).

Street vendors have proliferated in the colonia, taking over sidewalks, especially near office buildings. Most of these vendors sell foods such as tortas, tacos, sweets and other fast/convenience foods. Residents complain that these vendors impede traffic and have a negative effect on established and legal businesses. Most are located on Lerma, Guadalquivir, Volga, Villalongin and Panuco Streets. When Paseo de Reforma closes for construction, protests or events, the streets on the colonia get jammed with diverted traffic.

== History ==
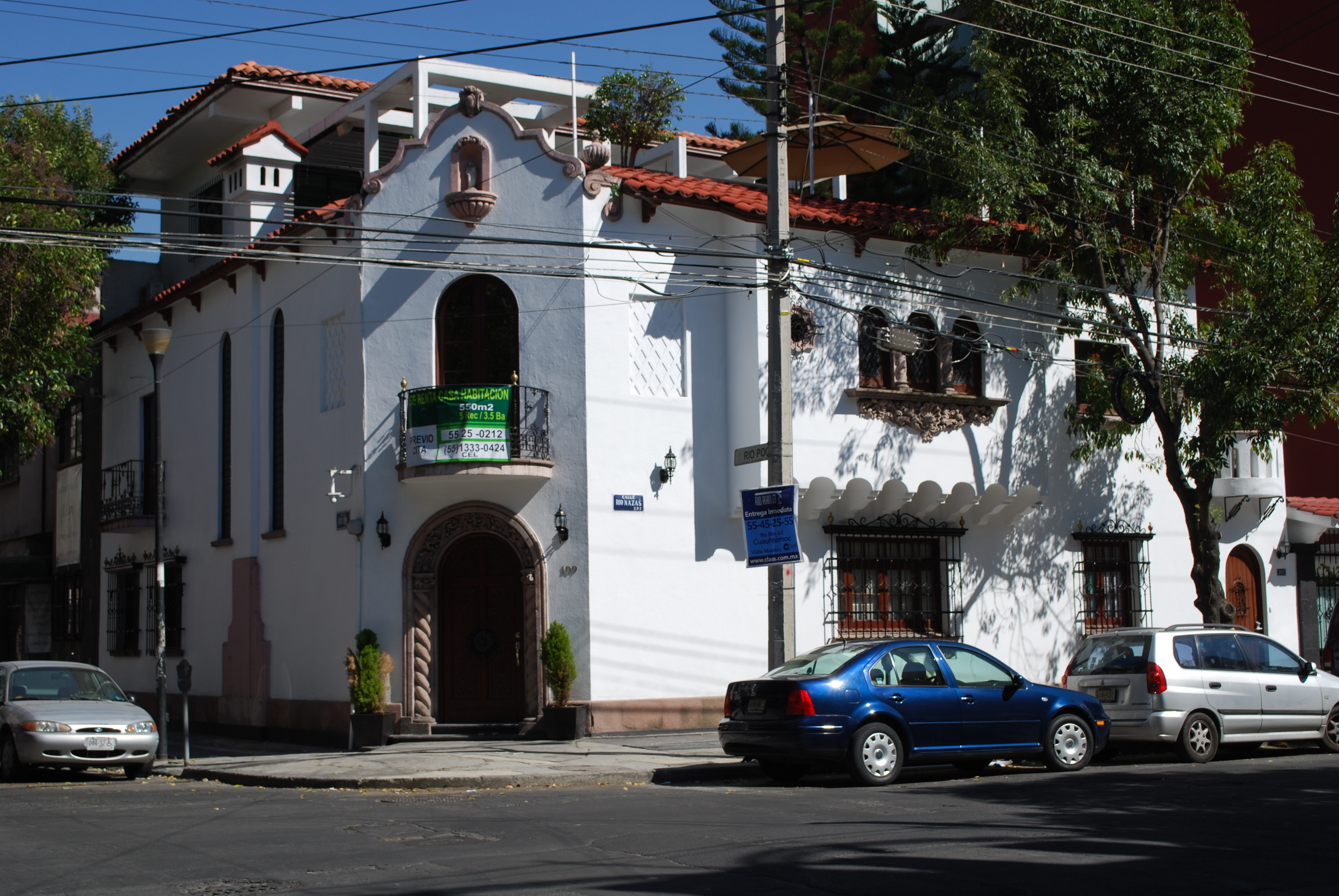
Home built in the colonial californiano style

In 1874, Rafael Martinez de la Torre obtained permission to establish a colonia on what were the lands of the Hacienda de la Teja, located west of what was then the city. The lands were located on both sides of the Paseo de la Reforma. The lands on the opposite side of the Paseo are now Colonia Juárez. The original name of the colonia was De la Teja and it was established in 1876, with plans to form the main streets at an angle to Paseo de la Reforma.

However, construction did not begin until 1882, when Salvador Malo acquired the rights to the land. This construction was interrupted in 1904 when the city contracted with the Mexico City Improvement Company to build a road leading south from the Paseo to Chapultepec Park, today Avenida Melchor Ocampo. Other lands in the north of the property were expropriated for the Ferrocarrill Nacional Mexico rail line, which was later used to build the Hospital de los Ferrocarrilles, today a unit of IMSS and the Jardín del Arte. The reduced colonia was officially approved by the city in 1907, with the new main street bearing the names of Reforma 1, 3, 5 and 7, then names such as Calle Norte 1 or Calle Sur 1. Eventually, these names were changed for their permanent ones, based on rivers found in the world. The colonia's name comes from the statue of Cuauhtémoc found on Paseo de la Reforma in this area, sculpted by Miguel Noreña.

In 1933, the neighborhood association, Asociación de Vecinos de la Colonia Cuauhtémoc, contracted with the city to make the area a “special zone for controlled development” in order to keep the area's primarily residential nature. Most commercial construction is limited to the areas facing Paseo de la Reforma.

Since the mid-1990s, the colonia was supposed to receive a percentage of the income from parking meters installed in the area by the Cuauhtemoc borough, mostly to augment public security. Between 2002 and 2006, none of that money was forthcoming until a recent judicial ruling in their favor. The amount in question was between 200,000 and 250,000 pesos per month from the 3,000 parking meters.

== Landmarks ==
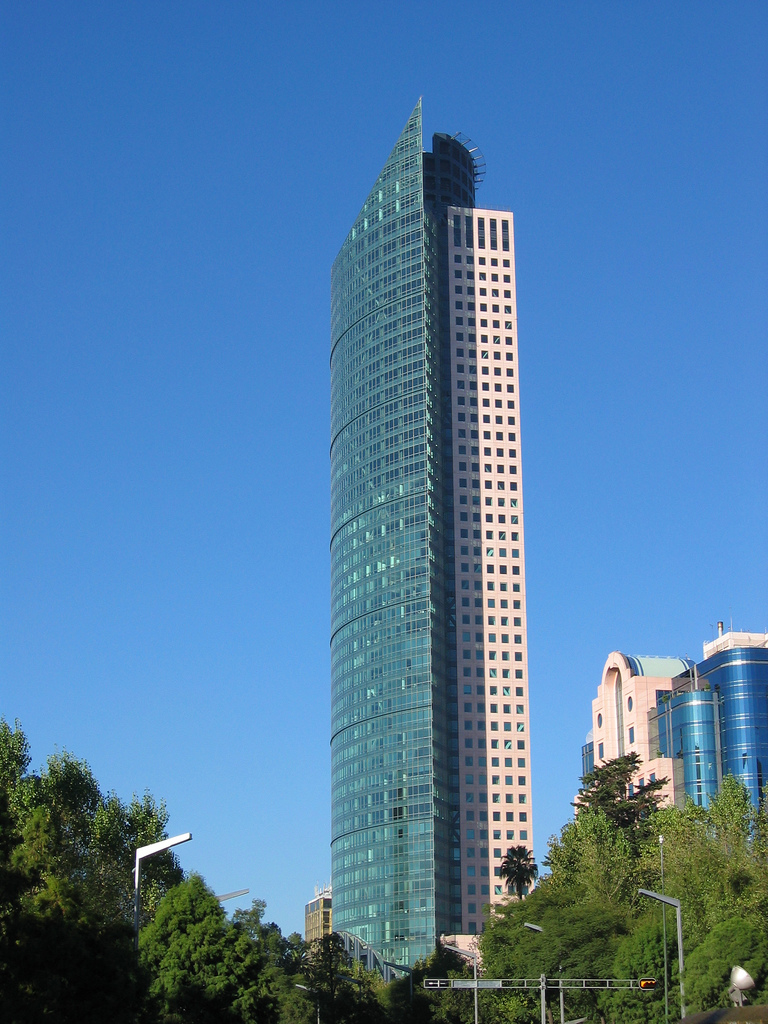
Torre Mayor

The Torre Mayor is located on Paseo de la Reforma at the western end of the colonia. It was finished in 2003, and from then to 2010, it was the tallest building in Latin America. It continues to be the tallest building in Mexico at 225.4 meters tall. Due to the earthquake-prone city, this tower was built with 96 dampers, which work like car shock absorbers to block the resonating effect of the lakebed and its own height. These diamond-shaped dampers are seen architecturally on its perimeter. With this extra-bracing, this tower can withstand earthquake forces nearly four times as efficiently as a conventionally damped building. The dampening system proved its worth in January 2003, when a 7.6 earthquake shook the city. Not only did the building survive undamaged, occupants inside at the time did not know a trembler had occurred.

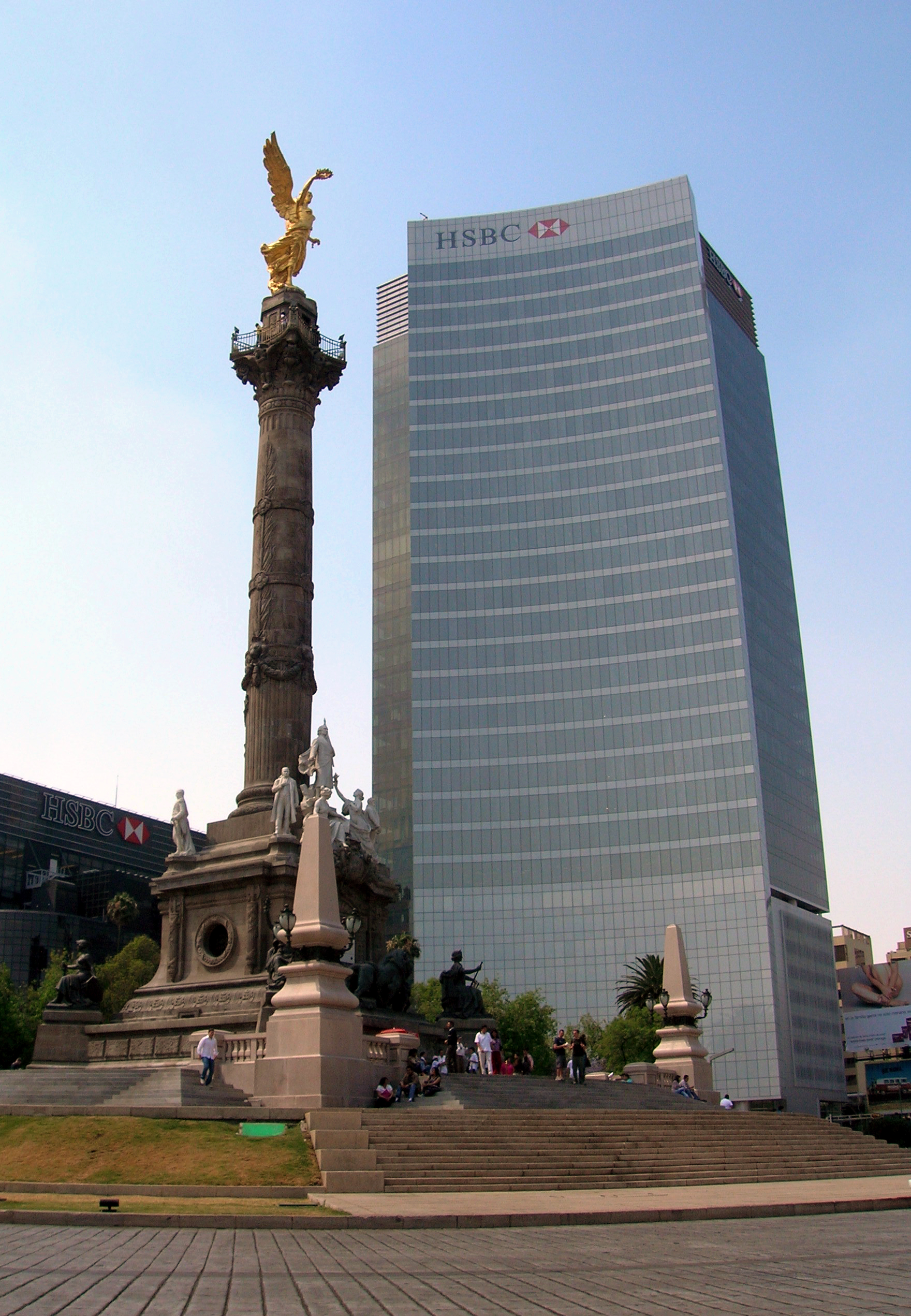
HSBC Tower and Angel de la Independencia

La Torre Ejecutiva, better known as the La Torre HSBC, was constructed at a cost of US$146 million in the colonia on Paseo de la Reforma overlooking the Angel de la Independencia. It was completed and occupied in 2006. The building has a LEED certification, which means that is it environmentally friendly, using technology to cut needs for water and electricity.

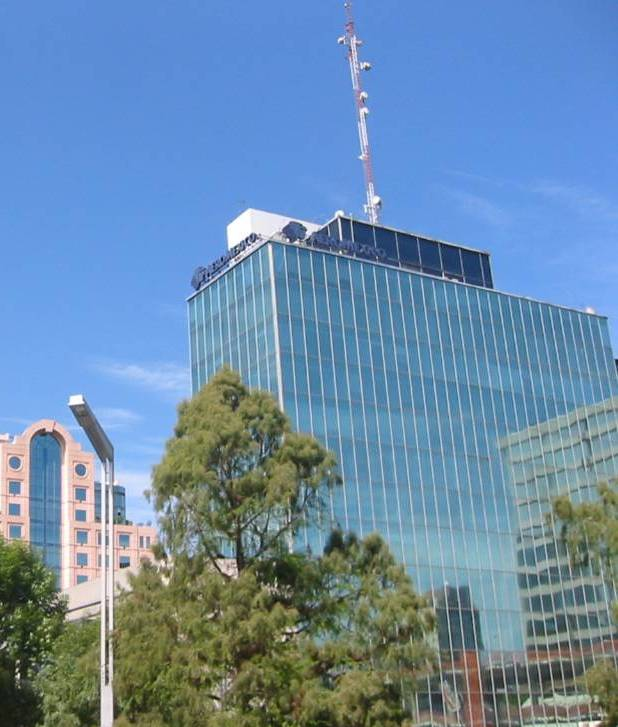
The headquarters of Aeroméxico

The Mexican Stock Exchange, or Bolsa Mexicana de Valores (BVM), is Mexico's only stock exchange. It is the second largest stock exchange by market capitalization in Latin America. BMV is now itself is a public company which is listed on its own stock exchange following a 2008 IPO. The Mexican Stock Exchange is located on Paseo de la Reforma on the eastern half of the colonia. It handles companies such as Cemex, Telmex, America Movil, Televisa, TV Azteca and Walmex.

=== U.S. Embassy ===
The U.S. embassy is located in the colonia, facing Reforma. This embassy has massive security around it and streets have been closed around the building for both security and construction purposes. The lines for those applying for visas regularly spills out into the side streets causing streets like Rio Danubio to close during the embassy's operating hours. The presence of the embassy also provokes 24-hour police presence of the area immediately surrounding the building but some residents doubt that this provides extra security.

=== New skyscrapers ===
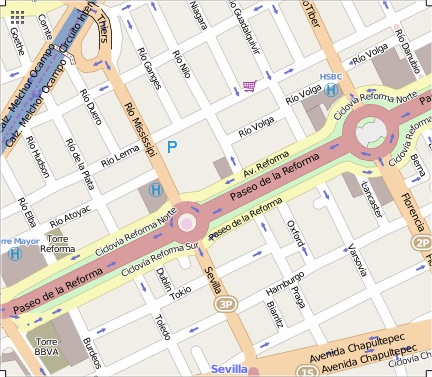
Skyscrapers under construction in the kilometer between Chapultepec Park and the Angel of Independence

Four skyscrapers are under construction along the boulevard between the entrance to Chapultepec Park and the Diana the Huntress fountain: Torre Reforma (244m), Punto Chapultepec (238m), and Torre Diana (158m). Across Reforma from colonia Cuauhtémoc the Torre BBVA Bancomer (235m) is rising, which will be the tallest building in the city upon completion.

== Economy ==
HSBC Mexico has its headquarters in the HSBC Tower in the community. Aeroméxico has its headquarters in the community. Cambridge Analytica maintains an office in the colonia.

Río Lerma street has become a "restaurant row".

== Transportation ==
=== Public transportation ===
The area is served by the Mexico City Metrobús and EcoBici bikeshare.

Metrobús stations

- La Palma
- El Ángel
- La Diana
