= Diana the Huntress Fountain =

Fountain and sculpture in Mexico City, Mexico

- Fuente de la Diana Cazadora
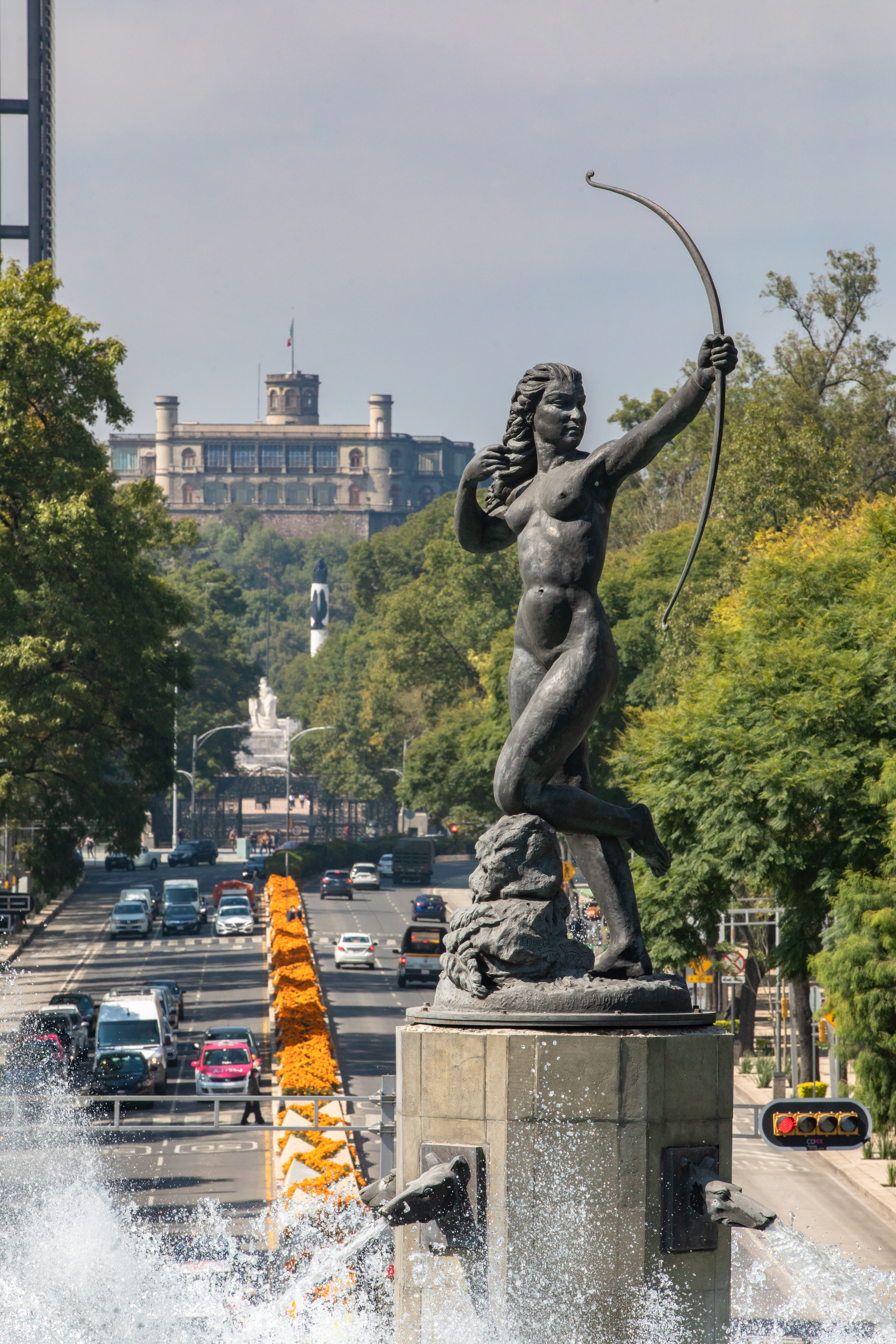
- The fountain in 2020
- Interactive map of Diana the Huntress Fountain
- Location: Roundabout at Paseo de la Reforma and Río Misisipi and Sevilla streets, Colonia Cuauhtémoc/Zona Rosa, Mexico City
- Coordinates: 19°25′31″N 99°10′18″W
- Designer: Vicente Mendiola (architect); Juan Fernando Olaguíbel (sculptor)
- Type: Fountain
- Beginning date: 1938
- Completion date: 1942

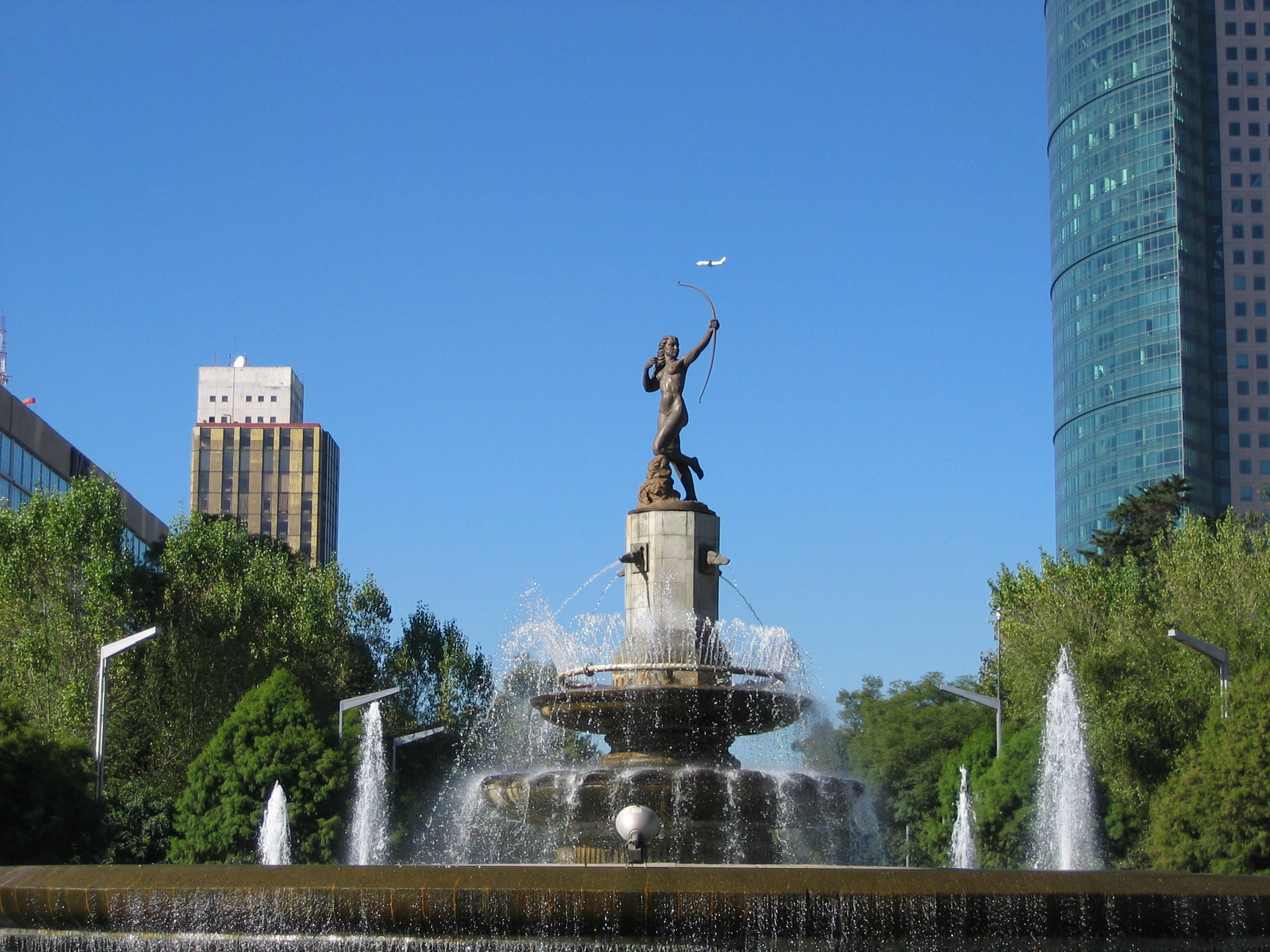
fountain of Diana

The Huntress Diana Fountain (Spanish: Fuente de la Diana Cazadora) is a sculpture situated within the roundabout at the intersection of Paseo de la Reforma and Río Misisipí and Sevilla streets, on the border of the Colonia Cuauhtémoc and Colonia Juárez neighborhoods in Mexico City. The fountain was designed by the Italian architect and sculptor Enrique Alciati, and was unveiled in 1942. The centerpiece of the fountain is a bronze statue depicting Diana, the Roman goddess of the hunt, on top of a stone pedestal. Nearby skyscrapers include the Corporativo Reforma Diana (also known as Torre Reforma Diana) and Torre Diana.

== History ==
Between the 1930s and 1960s, the capital authorities carried out different beautification projects that would involve the placement of various monuments and monumental fountains in the public space in tune with the mural movement and with the aesthetic influence of socialist realism.

The then president of Mexico Manuel Ávila Camacho, through the regent of the Federal District, Javier Rojo Gómez, commissioned the construction of a fountain for the roundabout that was located in Paseo de la Reforma near the entrance to the Chapultepec Forest. The project was given to the architect Vicente Mendiola and the sculptor Juan Olaguíbel, who would jointly carry out other similar projects, such as the fountain of the Plaza California in Colonia del Valle and the Oil Fountain. The topic chosen by the commission agents was Diana, the Roman goddess of the hunt. On this fountain, instead of hunting animals she would point her arrow to the stars of the northern sky. The sculpture was made between April and September 1942.
