= Bital =

Former Mexican financial institution (1941–2004)

Grupo Financiero Bital SA was Mexico's fifth-largest bank.

== History ==
Bital was first known as Banco del Atlantico during the 1980s and later was changed to Bital. It was the last Mexican bank whose balance sheet was still struggling from the 1995 Mexican peso crisis.

In 2002, HSBC Holdings PLC agreed to acquire Bital at an agreed price of $1.20 a share, thus Bital was valued at $1.14 Billion.
