= Sandy Flockhart =

British banker (born 1951)

Alexander Andrew "Sandy" Flockhart CBE (Chinese: 霍嘉治, born 22 December 1951) is a former CEO of The Hongkong and Shanghai Banking Corporation Limited.

== Early life ==
He was born in the UK and brought up and educated in Edinburgh, Scotland, where he attended George Watson's College. He joined HSBC in July 1974 after graduating in law (LLB) from the University of Edinburgh.

== Career ==
His appointments include postings to Hong Kong, the United Arab Emirates and Qatar. From 1992-1994, Flockhart served as CEO of Thailand branch of The Hongkong and Shanghai Banking Corporation. In January 1995, he became Deputy Managing Director of The Saudi British Bank (SABB).

He was Presidente y Director General of HSBC Mexico from October 2002, during which time he opened Torre HSBC, the new headquarters of the bank in April 2006. In September 2006, Flockhart became the CEO and President of HSBC for Latin America and the Caribbean.

In June 2007, the HSBC Group announced that Flockhart was to become CEO of The Hongkong and Shanghai Banking Corporation. He also became Chairman and non-executive director of HSBC Bank Malaysia, a director of HSBC Bank Australia and a non-executive director of HSBC Bank (China) and Hang Seng Bank. He became an executive director of HSBC Holdings in May 2008.

In 2012 he retired from HSBC, coinciding with a settlement with the US authorities in which HSBC Mexico, of which Sandy Flockhart had been CEO, admitted to aiding the laundering of nearly US$1 billion of drug traffickers funds. Following his departure from HSBC the bank was reported to be initiating a bonus clawback process against him.

In December 2012 he was named non-executive chairman of newly rebranded Church House Trust Plc after its acquisition by Ocean Industries.

== Honours and awards ==
He was appointed Commander of the Order of the British Empire (CBE) in the 2008 New Year Honours.

== Personal life ==
Flockhart's interests include golf, fishing, classic cars and history. He is married with four children, two of them born in Hong Kong.
