= John Flint (banker) =

British banking businessman

John Flint CBE
- Born: John Michael Flint; 1968 (age 57–58); Yorkshire, England
- Education: Giggleswick School; Portsmouth University
- Occupation: Banker
- Years active: 1989 – present
- Known for: Former CEO of HSBC
- Title: CEO, National Wealth Fund
- Term: February 2018 – August 2019
- Predecessor: Stuart Gulliver
- Successor: Noel Quinn
- Children: 2

John Michael Flint (born 1968) is a British banking businessman, who was chief executive (CEO) of HSBC Group from February 2018, having succeeded Stuart Gulliver. After serving for about 18 months, Flint announced on 5 August 2019 that he would be stepping down from the position, after a mutual agreement with the board. He is the chief executive of the National Wealth Fund.

== Early life and education ==
Flint was born in Yorkshire in 1968. He was educated at Dhahran Academy and Giggleswick School. Flint grew up in Yorkshire in the early 1970s before moving to Saudi Arabia at the age of 7 where he attended elementary school when his father was a university professor. He returned to Yorkshire to go to boarding school. He earned a bachelor's degree in economics from the Portsmouth Polytechnic.

== Career ==
He joined HSBC in 1989 as international officer, and spent 14 years developing markets in Asia. In 2004, he integrated all of HSBC's investment activities under HSBC Global Asset Management umbrella. In 2006, Flint was promoted Group Treasurer, and Deputy Head of Global Markets and Head of Global Markets MENA in 2008. In 2010, Flint became the CEO of HSBC Global Asset Management. In 2012, he was named chief of staff to the group's CEO, in charge of strategy and planning. In January 2013, Flint became a managing director of HSBC and CEO of retail banking and wealth management (RBWM).

In October 2017, Flint was named CEO-designate of HSBC, and took over from Stuart Gulliver on 21 February 2018.

On 5 August 2019, he immediately ceased his day-to-day operations at the bank after mutual agreement with the board. His interim successor was named as Noel Quinn. No official reasons for this move were presented.

In September 2021, Flint was announced as the first permanent chief executive of the UK Infrastructure Bank, where he leads the organisation to support regional growth. In October 2024, Flint led the UK Infrastructure Bank as it transitioned into the National Wealth Fund.

== Personal life ==
Flint is married with two children.

Flint competes in triathlon and Ironman competitions.

Business positions
Preceded by Stuart Gulliver	Group Chief Executive of HSBC Group; 21 February 2018 – August 2019	Succeeded by Noel Quinn
