= Michael Geoghegan =

British banker

- Born: Michael Francis Geoghegan; 4 October 1953 (age 73)
- Occupation: Banker
- Known for: Former CEO, HSBC

Michael Francis Geoghegan CBE (born 4 October 1953) is an international banking business executive, who served as the chief executive (CEO) of HSBC from 26 March 2006 to 31 December 2010. He joined HSBC in 1973 and had previously led the group's South American and European operations.

== Early life and education ==
Michael Geoghegan was born in Windsor, England and educated in the United Kingdom and Ireland.

== Professional career ==
=== Early career: 1973 - 2006 ===
He joined HSBC in 1973 as an international manager and, since then, spent twelve years in North and South America, eight years in Asia, seven years in the Middle East and three years in Europe. Geoghegan arrived in Brazil in March 1997 to establish the group's operations in the country following the creation of Banco HSBC Bamerindus S.A. He was appointed a group general manager of HSBC Holdings plc in the same year.

In January 2000, as president of HSBC Bank (Brazil), he became responsible for all of HSBC's business throughout South America and chaired the group's regional executive committee. In October 2000 he became President of HSBC Investment Bank Brasil HSBC Seguros S.A. which resulted from the group's acquisition of CCF and the incorporation of certain activities of HSBC Brasil.

Once Geoghegan was appointed chief executive and a director HSBC Bank plc on 1 January 2004, he gave up the position of UK CEO on 6 March 2006 which was in turn filled by Dyfrig John.

=== Group CEO of HSBC: 2006 - 2010 ===
HSBC announced on 28 November 2005 that he would succeed Stephen Green as Group Chief Executive of HSBC Holdings, as Green became Group Chairman. Geoghegan was named Deputy Chairman of HSBC Bank plc 26 May 2006. In that management shuffle, the group management board was created in 2006. Before that, the chairman essentially held the duties of a chief executive, while the chief executive served as the deputy. Green said he wanted to break that tradition, having a management cadre to look after the business, while the chairman would oversee the controls of the business through compliance and audit and the direction of the business. Geoghegan was paid an annual salary of £1,070,000 for his role as chief executive.

He shifted the chief executive's office of HSBC Group from London to Hong Kong on 28 January 2010, while the chairman remained in London. He became the chairman of The Hong Kong and Shanghai Banking Corporation.

With group chairman Stephen Green planning to depart HSBC to accept a government appointment as Minister of Trade, Geoghegan was expected to become the next chairman. However, many shareholders instead pushed for an external candidate. Geoghegan's detractors noted that while he was effective at getting things done, they argued that his blunt style was unsuited to leading the board and representing HSBC with heads of government, and his appointment as chairman would also flout UK governance guidance that discouraged chief executives becoming chairman. Geoghegan had reportedly threatened to quit if he was passed over in favour of former Goldman Sachs President John L. Thornton. HSBC's board of directors had reportedly been split over the succession planning, and investors were alarmed that this row would damage the company.

On 23 September 2010, Geoghegan announced he would step down as chief executive of HSBC. He was succeeded as chief executive of HSBC by Stuart Gulliver, while Green was succeeded as Chairman by Douglas Flint; Flint was serving as HSBC's finance director (chief financial officer). Geoghegan remained with HSBC as an adviser until 30 June 2011. In an interview after he retired, Geoghegan stated that he was proud that Flint and Gulliver were chosen to lead HSBC.

=== Controversies ===
HSBC bonuses

After what The Guardian called a "brutal boardroom battle" relating partly to who would ascend to the chairmanship, on September 23, 2010, it was reported that Geoghegan would be replaced as HSBC chief executive by Stuart Gulliver. After Geoghegan had left HSBC, in 2012 there was a US senate investigation into charges of money laundering against HSBC Mexico, with HSBC ultimately paying a record settlement to the United States Department of Justice. Subsequently, the HSBC chairman stated the bank was considering a bonus clawback procedure against Geoghegan and Sandy Flockhart over the settlement. Geoghegan was ultimately "excluded from the clawback arrangement because the bank's remuneration committee did not conclude that he had been personally responsible for the compliance failings."

Offshore trusts

In April 2016 Geoghegan was named as one of the clients of Panamanian corporate service provider Mossack Fonseca, and The Guardian reported on his legal use of offshore firms to "manage his wealth". Geoghegan defended his use of the firms, noting that he was "an international investor" and that "since the early 60s the UK government have encouraged foreign investment in residential and commercial real estate."

The Guardian also reported that Geoghegan had previously owned a London townhouse through an offshore company, and in 2012 had informed Mossack Fonseca that he planned to rent the property himself after renovating it. The Guardian wrote that by renting from his own offshore trust, he would have been legally but unethically avoiding British property taxes. When asked on the matter, Geoghegan noted that at the time he had not been a UK resident or domiciled in the UK, and therefore would not have been dodging tax laws. He sold the home in 2014.

== Political views ==
=== Opposition to public spending cuts ===
Though generally in favor of reducing public spending, Geoghegan warned in 2010 not to cut spending to the extent that it is "cutting into the muscle" of the western world", which could lead to social conflict and strikes.

=== Comments on Brexit ===
In April 2016, Geoghegan wrote an op-ed in the Financial Times arguing in favor of Brexit. He argued that claims of what could happen to The City in case of Brexit were exaggerated and that, upon leaving the EU, the UK would move into a position of strength "because Europe needs Britain far more than Britain needs Europe," deriving from the assumption that Brussels would seek to retain unfettered access to the UK and because Britain imports more goods from Europe than are being sold there. However, Geoghegan urged Brexit campaigners to acknowledge the EU's laudable ambition to prevent another devastating European war.

In May 2016, Geoghegan and Peter Udale, an independent risk consultant, wrote a paper supporting the UK leaving the European Union. They argued that the Bank of England has "given the impression that all the risks lie on the leave side", and that London has allowed the EU to impose an excessive amount of regulations on the financial sector, lost control to the Eurozone states, as well as key governmental powers such as the ability to set taxation. The paper concluded that "a vote to leave would allow the UK to take back control over the City, would reduce the risk of future euro-contagion to the UK financial services sector and the wider UK economy, would return primacy over areas such as taxation to the UK and, over the long term, would make the City a more competitive, prosperous global financial centre."

== Personal life ==
Geoghegan is married with two sons. In June 2003 he was appointed a Commander of the Order of the British Empire (CBE) in recognition of his contribution to British business interests in Brazil. Geoghegan is not a UK resident and has non-domiciled tax status.

Business positions
Preceded by Stephen Green	Group Chief Executive of HSBC Group; 2006 – 2011	Succeeded by Stuart Gulliver
