= HSBC Bank (China) =

Chinese bank based in Shanghai

HSBC Bank (China) Company Limited

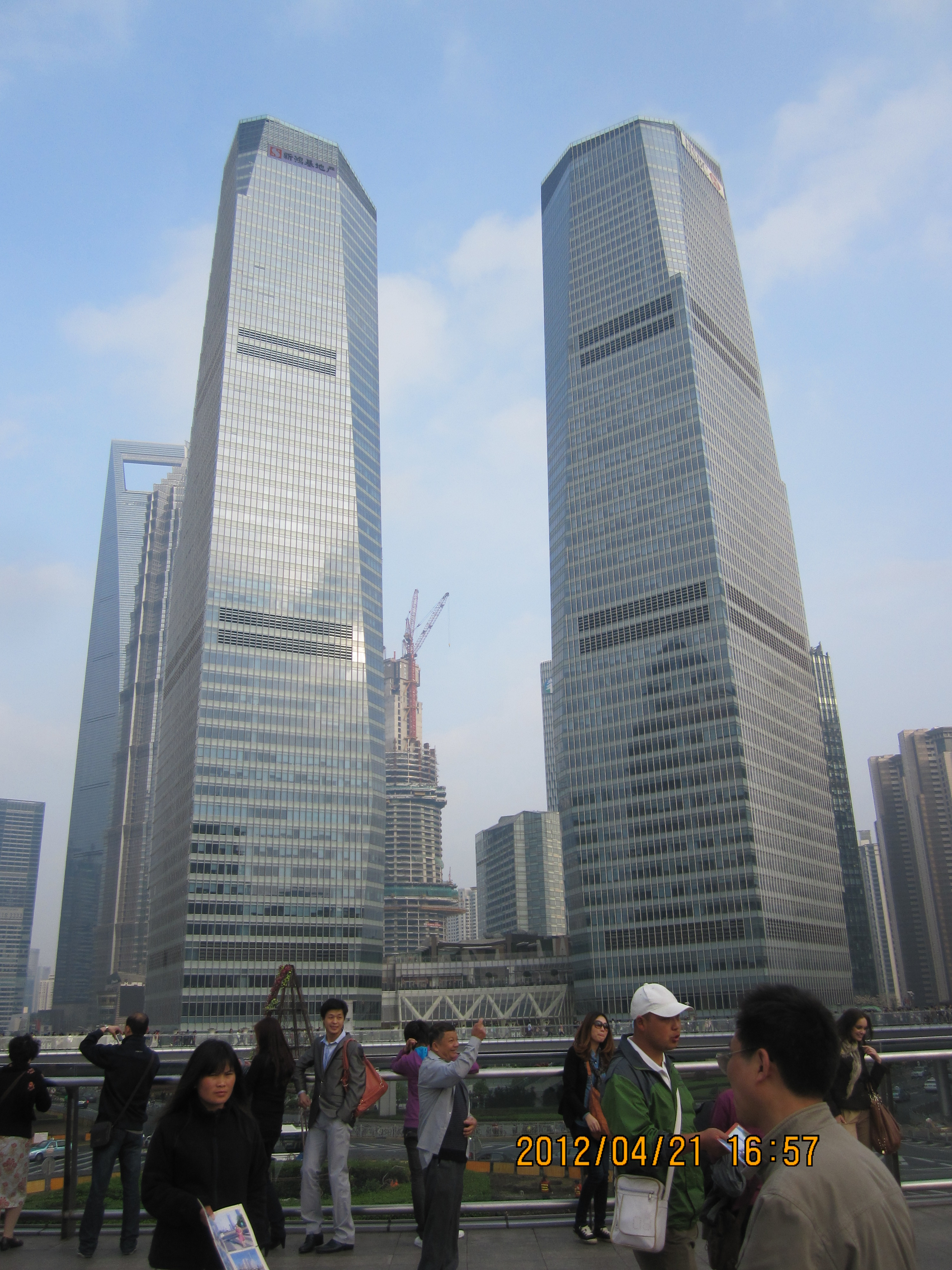
- Shanghai IFC complex in Pudong, with the north tower (right) hosting the head office of HSBC Bank China since 2010
- Type: Subsidiary
- Industry: Finance and Insurance
- Founded: 2007; 19 years ago
- Headquarters: Shanghai, China
- Key people: Vincent Cheng (chairman); Mark Wang (president and CEO)
- Products: Financial services
- Number of employees: 5,500
- Parent: HSBC Group through HSBC Hong Kong
- Website: hsbc.com.cn

HSBC Bank (China) Company Limited (Chinese: 汇丰银行(中国)有限公司; often abbreviated as 汇丰中国) is the Chinese branch of the global HSBC financial institution, and was one of the first foreign banks to incorporate locally in mainland China in 2007. It is part of the worldwide HSBC Group and is wholly owned by HSBC's Hong Kong operations.

== History of HSBC China ==
The Hongkong and Shanghai Banking Corporation established its Shanghai branch office on 3 April 1865, previous to other upstarts of HSBC, and indeed, as part of the historic English investment of Eastern Asian nations in the 19th century. Apart from the period 1941 to 1945, during which Japan forced HSBC and other foreign-invested banks to leave the local market, it has had a continuous presence in the city. HSBC was historically housed in one of the largest and most impressive buildings on The Bund, Shanghai's boulevard formerly known as the "Wall Street of the Orient".

In April 1955, HSBC handed over this office to the Communist government, and its activities were continued in rented premises. Its activities were mainly in inward remittances and export bills until the economic reforms of the late 1970s. Chinese authorities had offered to lease HSBC its old headquarters on The Bund in 1995 but the offer was turned down. In 2000, HSBC China moved into HSBC Tower across the river in the Pudong area of Shanghai. In 2010, HSBC China's headquarters moved out of the HSBC Tower and moved into HSBC Building in Shanghai IFC.

In July 2022, HSBC became the first foreign lender to open a Chinese Communist Party committee in its Chinese investment banking subsidiary. The subsidiary, HSBC Qianhai Securities, is a 90% HSBC-owned joint venture.

In June 2024, HSBC Bank (China) started to provide digital yuan services to its corporate clients.

== International banking for Chinese customers ==
In mainland China, HSBC has the largest services network among foreign banks. The bank offers a full range of services that cater to both middle-class individuals (Premier Banking Service) and to business-oriented individuals as well, from a robust network of 37 main branches, and 23 smaller branches, also known as sub-branches (支行) in Chinese. HSBC China does not provide basic account service for personal banking, meaning all clients are required to deposit 500,000 RMB to open an account with HSBC China, unless the client is a qualified premier customer elsewhere with other HSBC entities.

Although subject to foreign exchange regulation, HSBC China still manages to provide a rich range of international services to its local clients in China, including the free global transfer service and competitive time deposit quotes for foreign currencies. In addition, HSBC is also a registered bank with Qualified Domestic Institution Investor (QDII) license in China, meaning it can provide financial products consisting of overseas mutual funds and other derivatives to its local Chinese clients.

HSBC China also has a range of credit card services and home loan solutions.

HSBC having invested over US$5 billion in select mainland financial services entities and in the growth of its own operations, including a 19.90% stake in Bank of Communications, a 16.8% stake in Ping An Insurance, and an 8% stake in Bank of Shanghai.

== Local incorporation ==
The China Banking Regulatory Commission announced on 24 December 2006 its approval for foreign banks to start their preparatory work for setting up local incorporations in mainland China. These foreign banks can launch the RMB retail business of below RMB1 million for Chinese domestic citizens after the inspection and confirmation by the relevant banking regulatory administration authorities. The Hongkong and Shanghai Banking Corporation was one of nine foreign banks to have applied for the incorporation. On 1 April 2007, the mainland China offices of The Hongkong and Shanghai Banking Corporation transferred to its subsidiary HSBC Bank (China), and it started operations on 2 April. The registered capital and paid-up capital of HSBC Bank (China) is equivalent to RMB8 billion. However, The Hongkong and Shanghai Banking Corporation still has a branch in Shanghai, which conducts foreign currency wholesale banking business.

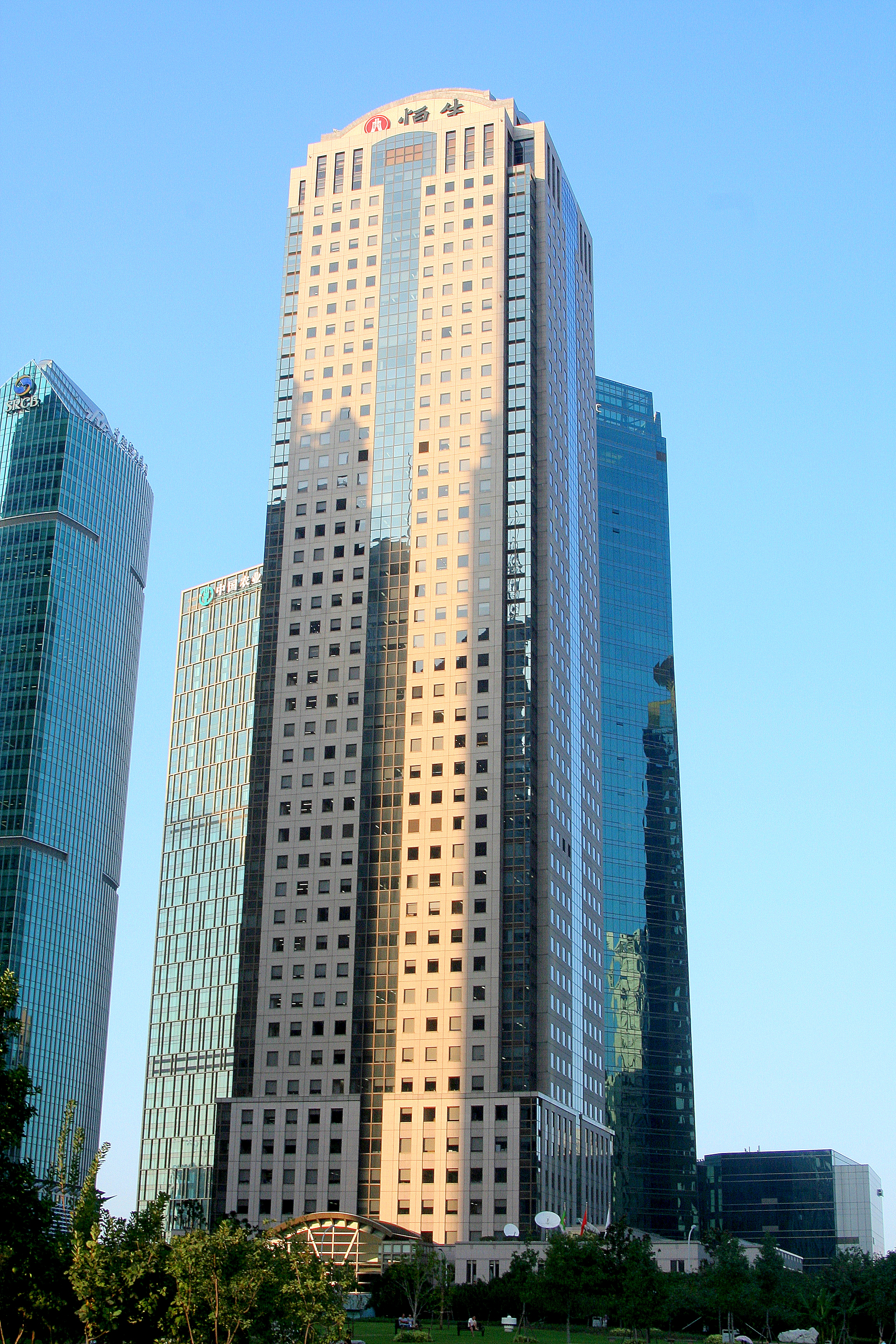
Hang Seng Bank Tower in Shanghai, head office of HSBC Bank China from 1998 to 2010

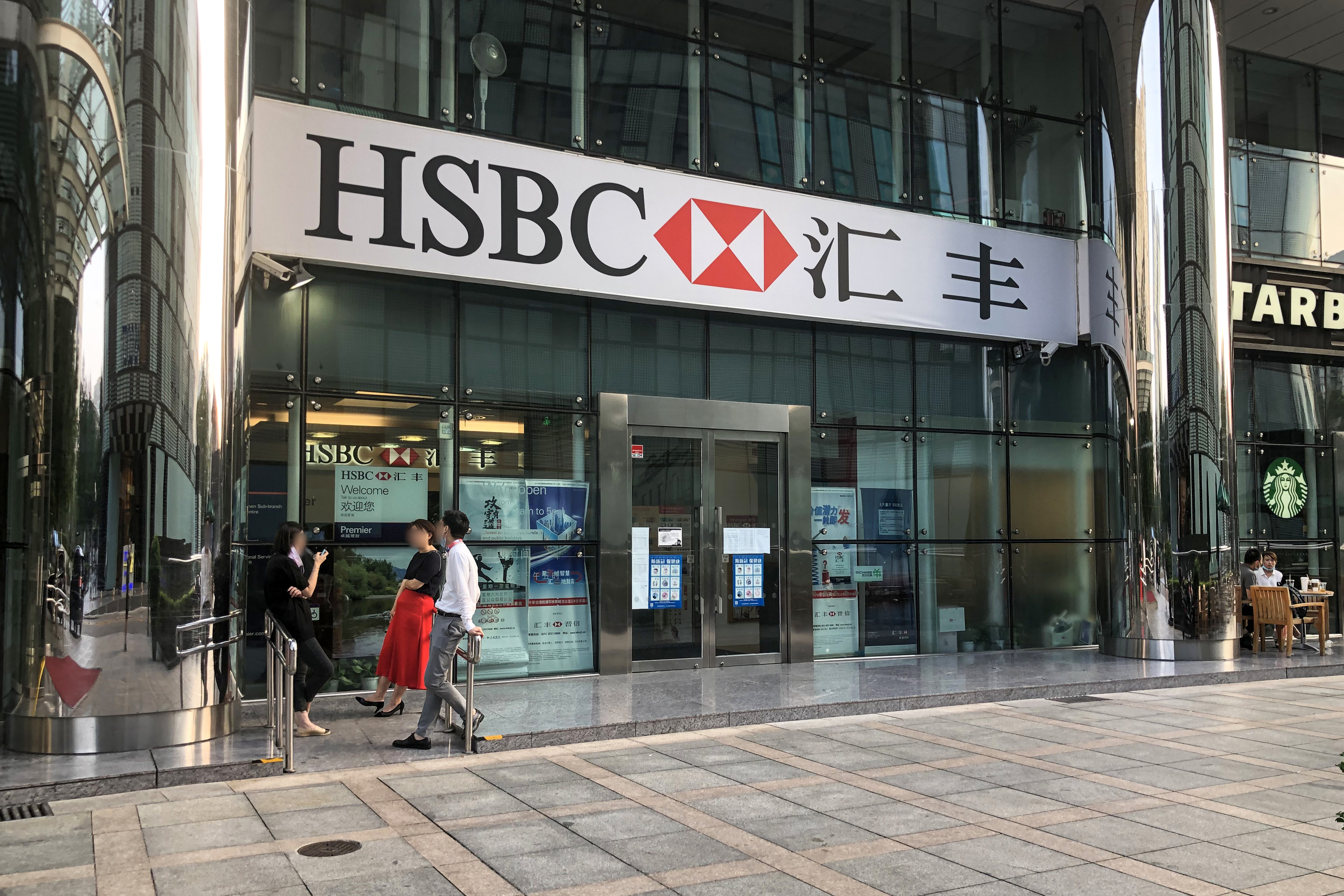
HSBC Beijing Dongzhimen sub-branch

== See also ==
- HSBC Lions
