= HBC =

HBC or HbC may refer to:

== Companies and organizations ==
- Halton Borough Council, England
- Hellenic Broadcasting Corporation, the state-owned radio and television broadcaster for Greece
- Hokkaido Broadcasting, Japan
- Houston Boychoir, Texas, US
- HSBC Bank Canada
- Hudson's Bay Company, New York City and Toronto
- Hummelstown Brownstone Company, US

=== Sports ===
- Harvard Boxing Club, a student organization at Harvard University, US
- HB Chartres, a French association football club
- Hyderabad Bicycling Club, India

== Science and technology ==
- Hemoglobin C (HbC), an abnormal hemoglobin
- Hexabenzocoronene, a polycyclic aromatic hydrocarbon
- Hormonal birth control, a contraceptive
- Human-based computation, a computer science technique
- High breaking capacity, a type of electrical fuse
- HBC, a grade of hexagonal boron nitride

== Other uses ==
- Haebangchon, a neighborhood in Seoul, South Korea
- Homebrew Channel, application for Nintendo Wii
- Harvey's Bristol Cream, a type of wine
- Head Ball Coach, nickname of retired college football coach Steve Spurrier
- Helena Bonham Carter (born 1966), actress
- Historically black college (see HBCU).

== See also ==
- Historically black colleges and universities (HBCU)
- HSBC (disambiguation)
