= HSBC lions =

Sculptures of lions, symbolic of HSBC

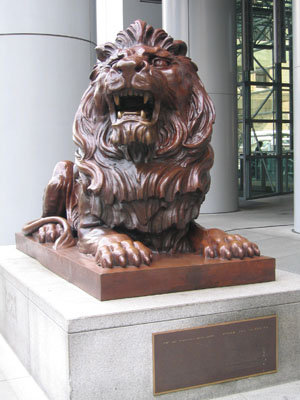
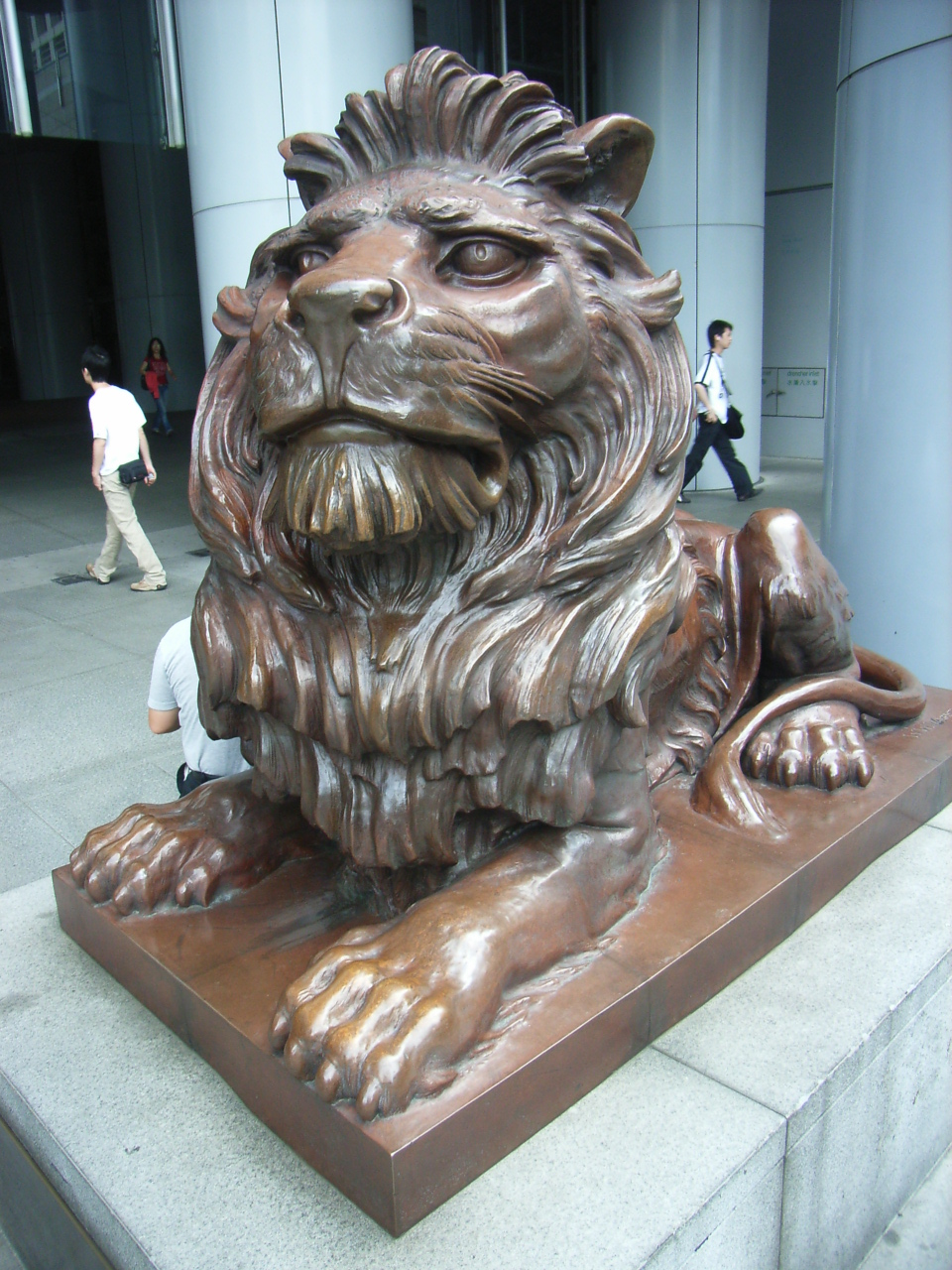
The lion statues of HSBC Main Building in Hong Kong, nicknamed "Stephen" (left) and "Stitt" (right) after two of the bank's managers

Various headquarters and branch buildings of The Hongkong and Shanghai Banking Corporation (and later the HSBC Group) feature a pair of lion sculptures. The HSBC lions have become distinctive landmarks in their own right in Hong Kong and Shanghai, with further pairs to be found in London and Birmingham.

== Shanghai (1923) ==
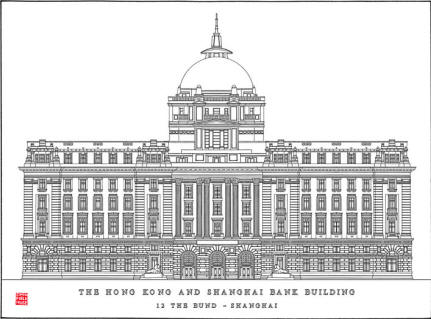
Elevation of the HSBC Building in Shanghai, showing the placement of the lions by the main doors.

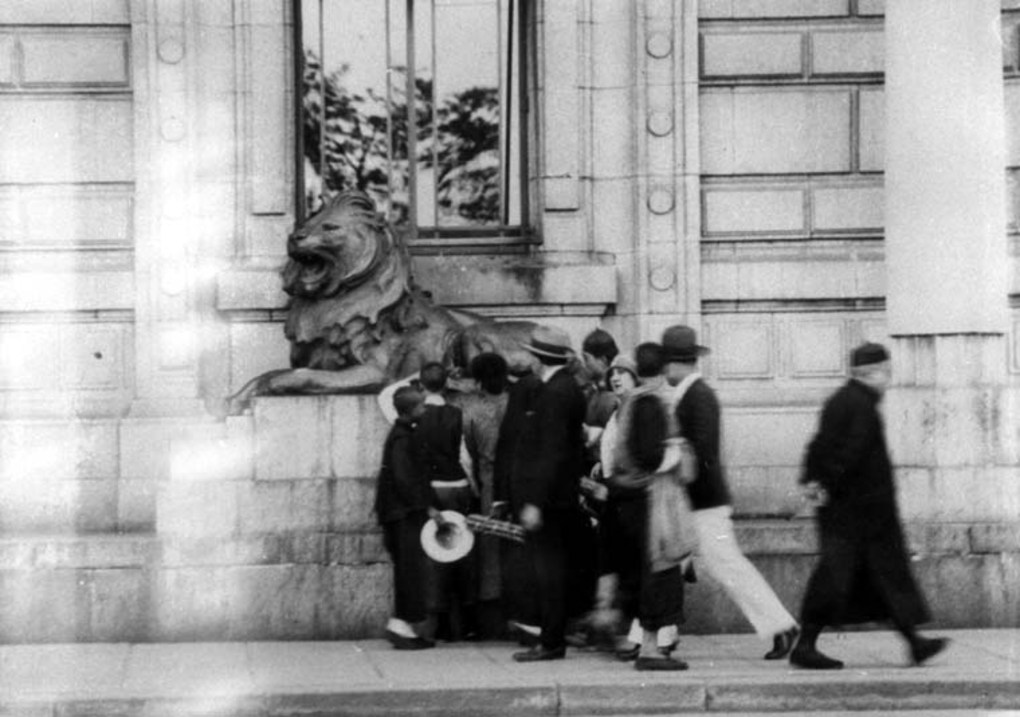
Patting the lion's paw for "good luck" at HSBC Shanghai (1920s)

The first set of lion sculptures were commissioned for the rebuilt HSBC Building on the Bund in Shanghai, opened in 1923. Chief Manager Alexander Stephen wrote, in 1921, that the inspiration for his decision to order their sculpting came from the imposing lions outside the Venetian Arsenal.

Cast by J W Singer & Sons in the English town of Frome, to a design by Henry Poole RA, these lions had quickly become part of the Shanghai scene, and passers-by would affectionately stroke the lions in the belief that power and money would rub off on them. They became known as Stephen and Stitt. Stephen was named for Alexander Gordon Stephen, formerly Manager Shanghai, and in 1923 the Chief Manager of HSBC, and Gordon Holmes Stitt, the then Manager Shanghai. Stephen is depicted roaring, Stitt quiescent; insiders said that this represented the characters of the two famous bankers.

== Hong Kong (1935) ==
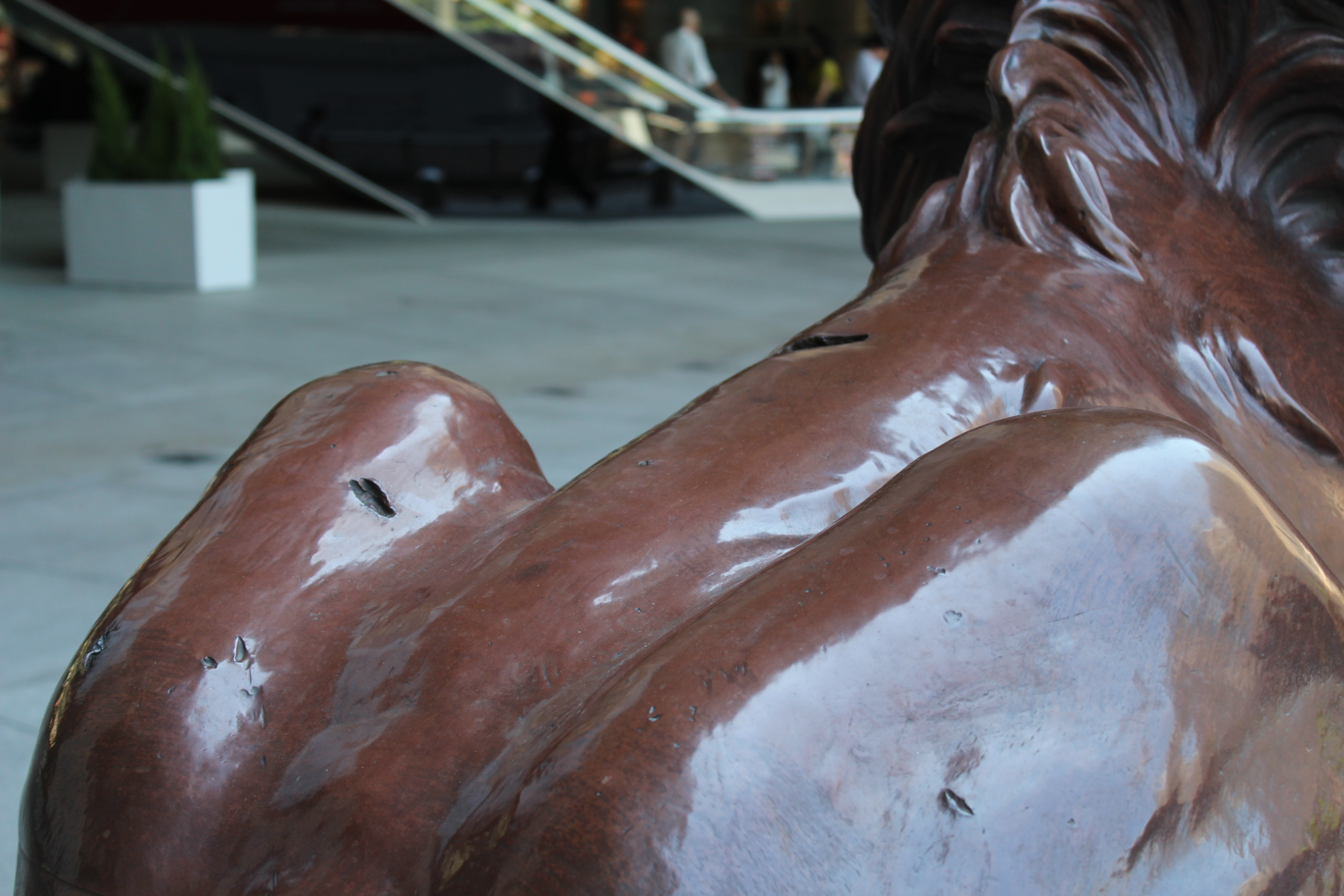
Shrapnel damage from the 1941 Battle of Hong Kong.

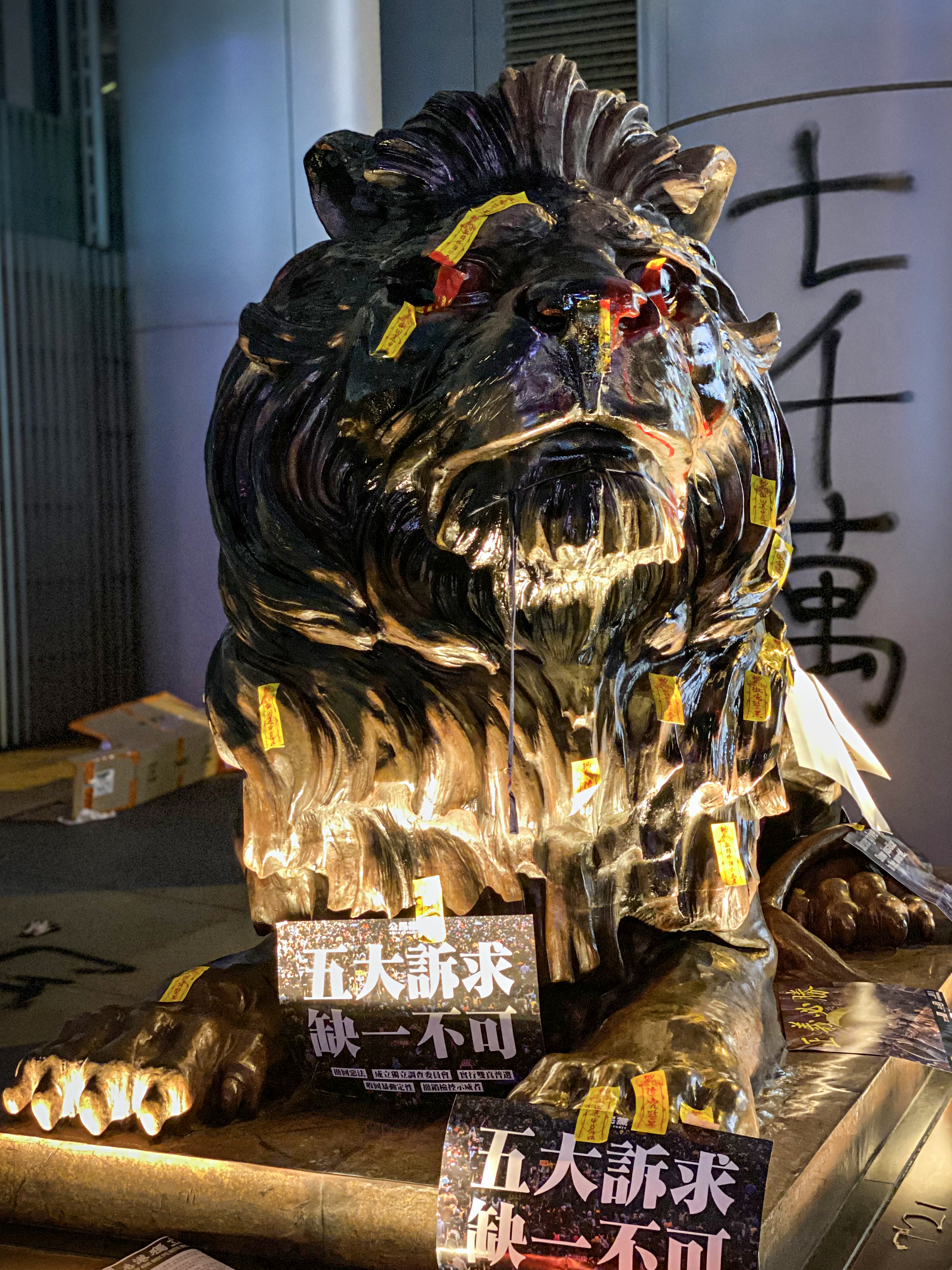
HSBC lion damage on January 1 march in Hong Kong in 2020

When HSBC decided to build its third Headquarters at 1 Queen's Road Central in Hong Kong, opened in 1935, it commissioned two bronze lions from Shanghai-based British sculptor WW Wagstaff. This commission was inspired by the earlier lions commissioned for the Shanghai office, and the Hong Kong lions were modelled on, but are not identical to, the Shanghai lions.

Wagstaff worked with "Shanghai Arts and Crafts" foreman Chou Yin Hsiang. In an interview with John Loch of HSBC's house magazine "Group News" in June 1977, Hsiang recalled that when he first joined Arts and Crafts, he worked on the lions with Wagstaff for two years without having to learn a word of English: Wagstaff spoke a perfect Shanghai dialect. Hunch-backed, Wagstaff was nicknamed "Lao Doo Pei", meaning "Old Hunchback". His son, inevitably, was called "Sau Doo Pei" – "Young Hunchback." Wagstaff had two sons – Don, killed in Naval service in the war, and Alex, killed while interned in Shanghai by the Japanese. Chou Yin Hsiang himself came to Hong Kong in 1935, and by 1977 was the proprietor of Jeh Hsing Metal Works – and still casting bronze for HSBC.

Like the Shanghai lions, the Hong Kong lions became objects of veneration, and foci of the Bank's perceived excellent feng shui. Young couples still bring their toddlers to stroke the paws and noses of the statues hoping for luck and prosperity.

When the 1935 building closed its doors for the last time on 26 June 1981, the lions had been moved to the annexe on 19 June 1981. Demolition, by China Swiss Engineers, started on 6 July 1981. The lions were temporarily moved on 4 June 1982 to Statue Square, opposite the back entrance where the lions were and currently are. The main entrance is on the other side, matching the bank's address 1 Queen's Road Central. This setup explicitly follows feng shui placement. As a mark of the respect in which the lions were held, the move to Statue Square, and the move back in 1985, were accompanied by the chairman Sir Michael Sandberg and senior management of the Bank and the placement of the lions both temporarily and in their current locations was made only after extensive consultations with feng shui practitioners.

Their 4-year sojourn in the annexe and Statue Square aside, the lions have only left their positions as guardians of the Des Voeux Road entrance of the Bank once: they were confiscated by the Japanese and sent to Japan to be melted down. The war ended before this could happen, with the lions being recognised by an American sailor in a dockyard in Osaka in 1945. They were returned to Hong Kong a few months later and restored to their original positions in October 1946.

The Hong Kong lions are also called Stephen (on the left-hand side of the entrance) and Stitt (on the right-hand side). Holes observed in their bronze are likely the result of shrapnel damage from shelling during the 1941 Battle of Hong Kong.

Stitt was set ablaze during protests for democracy on 1 January 2020. HSBC had been vandalized in December 2019 in protest over its freezing of an account belonging to Spark Alliance, an organization that was funding the protests.

== London (2002) ==
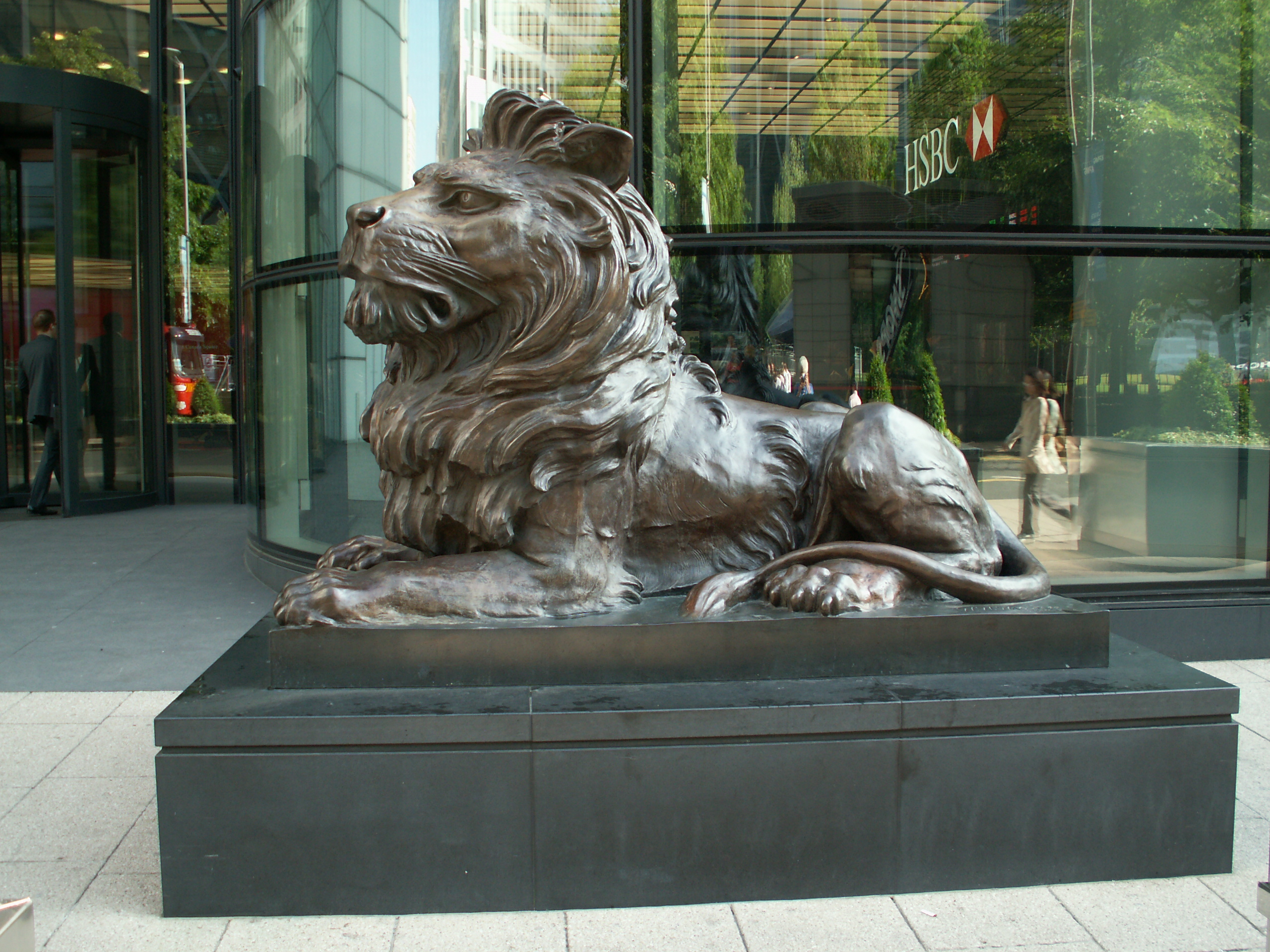
The London 'Stitt'

After the re-organisation of the HSBC business into the present-day HSBC Group, the Group's headquarters were relocated to London. The new headquarters building, located at 8 Canada Square, in the Canary Wharf development of the Isle of Dogs in London, opened in 2002. A pair of lions were again commissioned for the new headquarters. This pair was a close replica of the Hong Kong lions, even including the signatures of W.W. Wagstaff on the sculpture. The casting was completed at Bronze Age Foundry in nearby Limehouse, directed by Zambian-born New Zealand sculptor Mark Kennedy. However, Kennedy was asked not to reproduce the "war wounds" of the Hong Kong lions in the copies: they had to earn their own battle scars.

== Shanghai (2010) ==
In 2010, a further pair of lions, again copies of the originals, were commissioned for the Group's new China headquarters, located in the Shanghai IFC building, in Shanghai's newly developed Lujiazui area, across the river from the old Shanghai headquarters.

== List of HSBC lion statue re-casts ==
The following is a list of bronze copies and re-casts of the HSBC lions:

- In Hong Kong:
  - Hong Kong (current) (1935) – modeled on Shanghai originals; sculpted by William Wheatley Wagstaff, cast by Shanghai Arts and Crafts.
  - Hong Kong (replicas) (2015) – copies of Hong Kong lions; for the celebration of the 150th anniversary of HSBC.
- In Shanghai:
  - Shanghai (original) (1923) – sculpted by Henry Poole RA, cast by J W Stinger & Sons. The originals are on display at the Shanghai History Museum.
  - Shanghai (replicas) (c.1997) – copies of Shanghai originals, commissioned by the government-owned Shanghai Pudong Development Bank after it obtained the former HSBC building.
  - Shanghai (current) (2010) – copies of Hong Kong lions.
- In the United Kingdom:
  - London (2001) – copies of Hong Kong lions; cast by Bronze Age Foundry, Limehouse, at the direction of Mark Kennedy.
  - Birmingham (2018) - copies of Hong Kong lions.

Various other HSBC buildings around the world feature guardian lions – often reduced-size copies of the Shanghai or Hong Kong lions with varying degrees of faithfulness, though others use entirely unrelated figures, such as Chinese guardian lions.

=== Rainbow lions ===
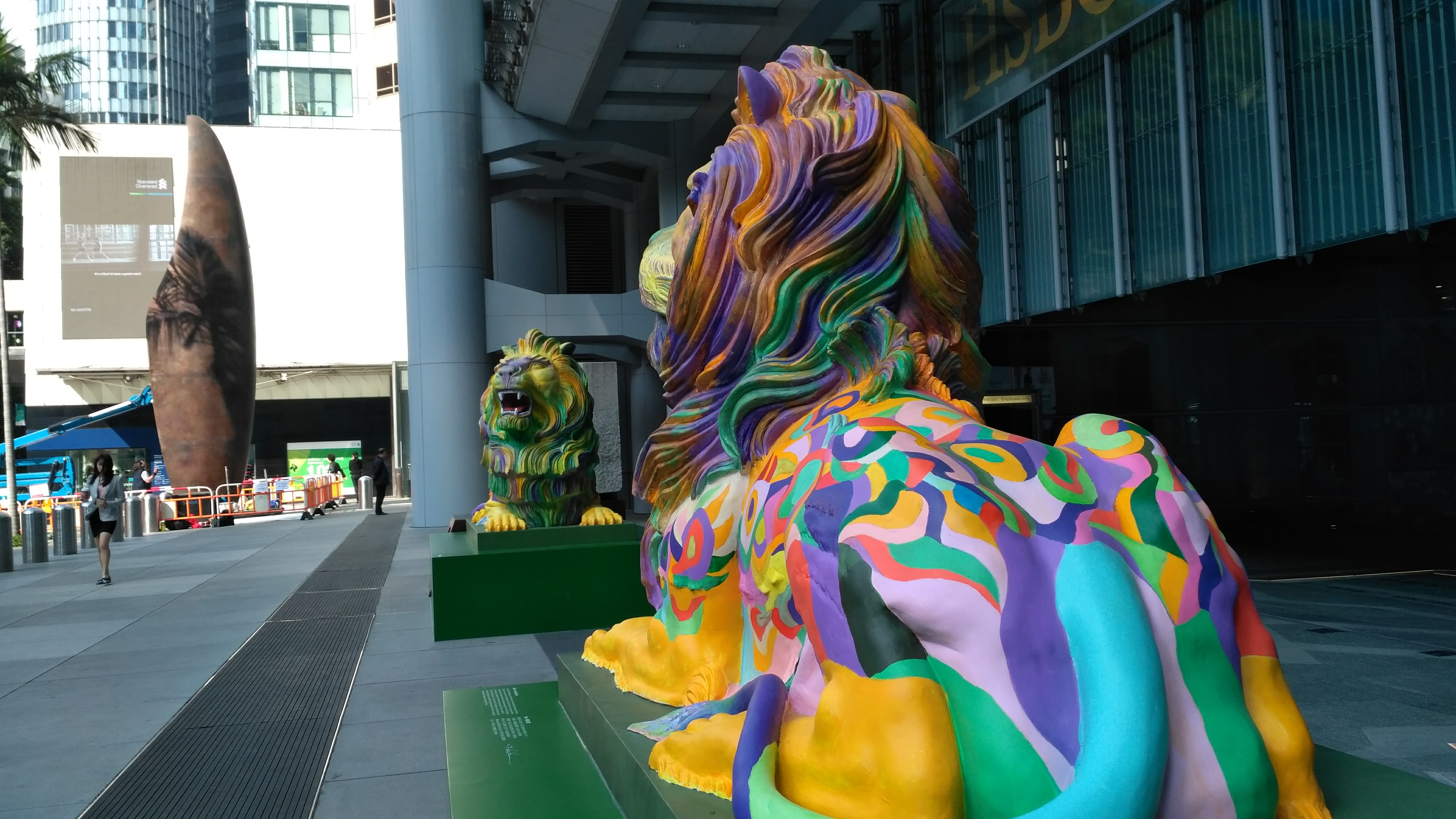
The rainbow lions outside the Hong Kong HSBC headquarters

In 2016, HSBC installed two rainbow-painted replicas of the lions at its Hong Kong headquarters in Queen's Road Central, in recognition of LGBT rights. The artwork was designed by Michael Lam. They were removed after an online petition started by Roger Wong Wai-ming and other concerned shareholders. Stephen was painted in stripes while Stitt was painted in circles. The lions were eventually accepted by the Philippine Global Service Center and are housed at Commonwealth, Quezon City.

== Influence ==
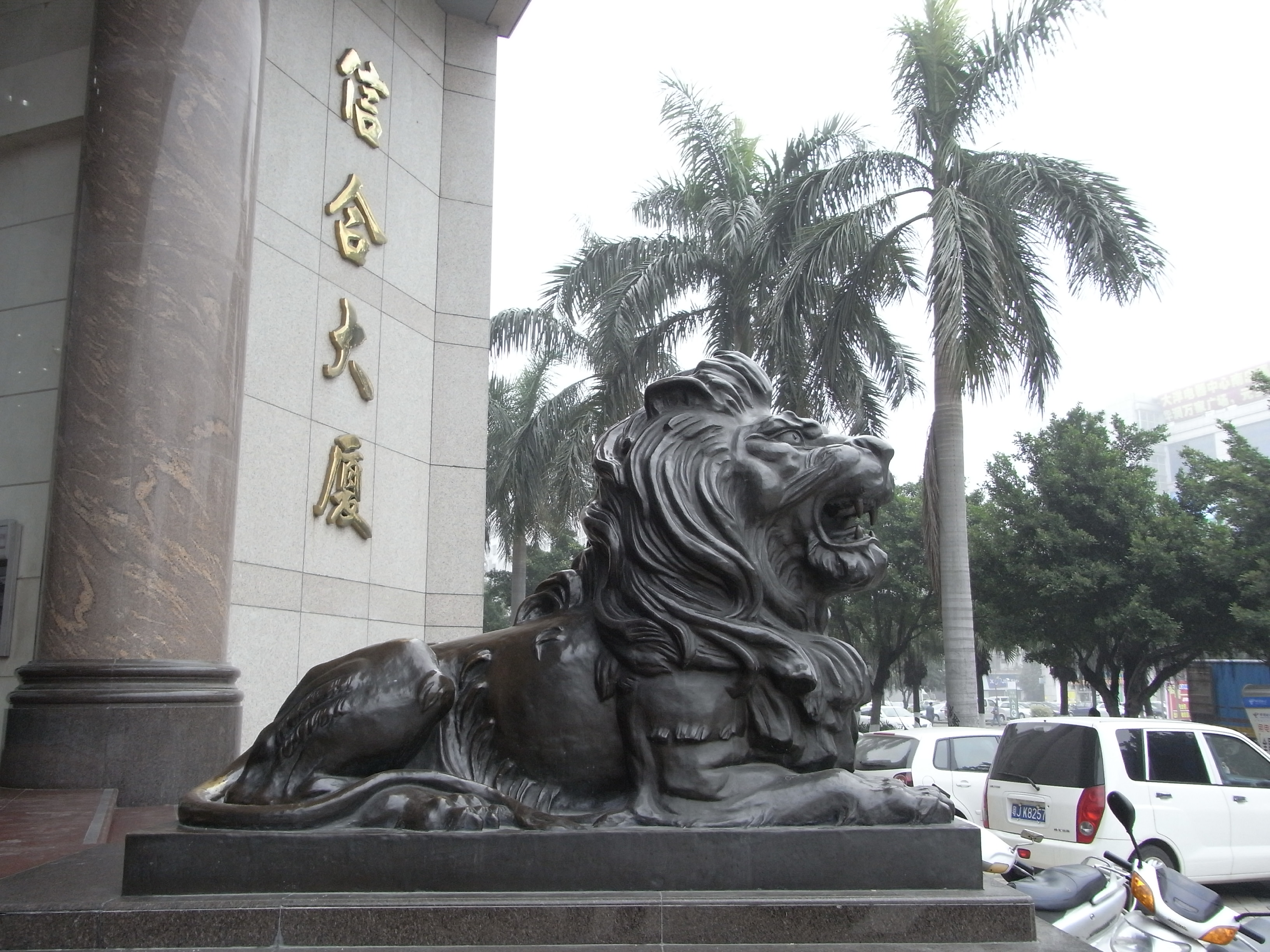
An example of a "counterfeit" HSBC lion in China, one of a pair located in Xinhui.

The Hong Kong lions are depicted on banknotes of the Hong Kong dollar issued by HSBC. They are seen as one of the key symbols of HSBC, so much so that HSBC is locally known in Hong Kong as "the Lion Bank". The HSBC lions are also shown on all HSBC credit and debit cards in their 2017 card design.

The influence of the HSBC lions are such, that in some parts of China guardian lions more or less based on the Shanghai or Hong Kong lions have become a distinct genre of mass-produced architectural sculptures, offered by local producers (without authorisation from HSBC) under the name of "HSBC lions" (in Chinese, "汇丰狮"), usually marketed to banks and other financial institutions.

== See also ==
- List of public art in Tower Hamlets
