= HSBC (disambiguation) =

HSBC is a British multinational bank group.

HSBC may also refer to:

== Banking ==
- HSBC Building, the Bund
- HSBC Building (Hong Kong)
- HSBC Tower, London
- HSBC Tower, Shanghai

=== See also ===
- HSBC Bank (disambiguation)

== Sport ==
- Hampton School Boat Club

== Other ==
- Humane Society of Bergen county
