= William Wheatley Wagstaff =

British sculptor active in China

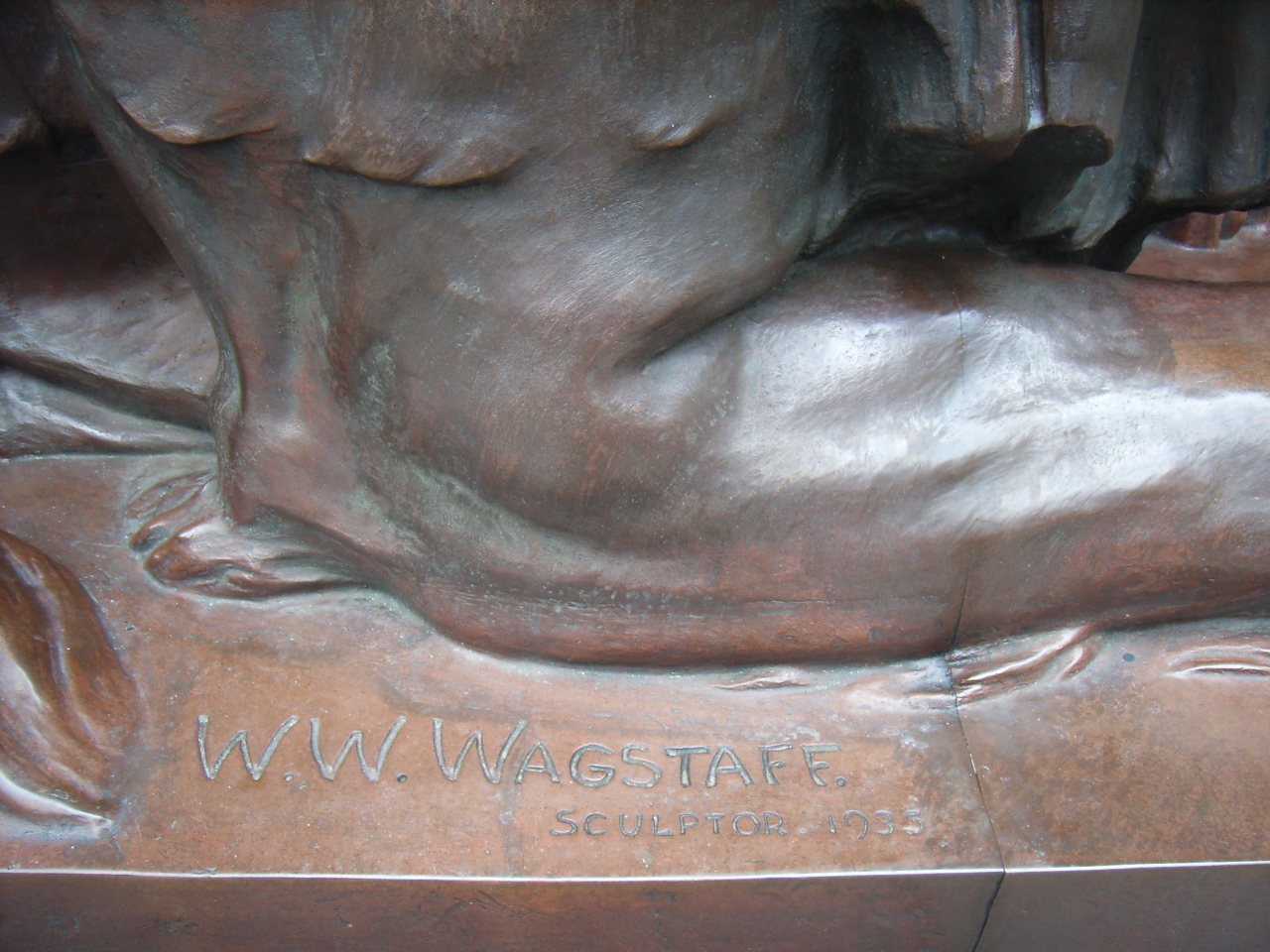
Signature of W.W. Wagstaff on one of the HSBC lions statues in front of the HSBC Main Building in Hong Kong.

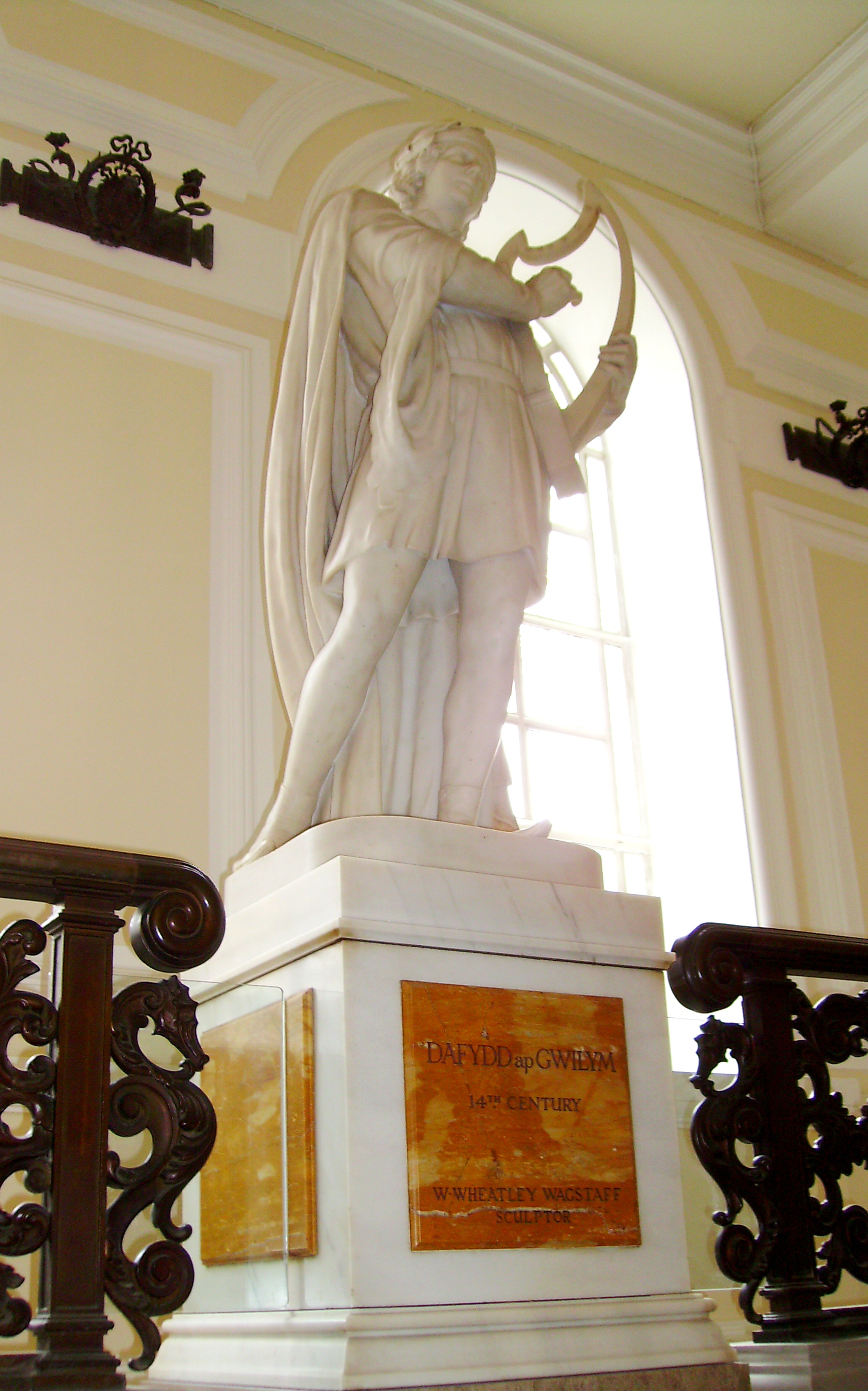
Sculpture of Dafydd ap Gwilym by W.W. Wagstaff, Cardiff City Hall, Cardiff, Wales.

William Wheatley Wagstaff (Chinese: 魏达; 1880-1962) was a British sculptor, who was active in China from 1920 to 1946.

== Biography ==
Wagstaff was a student of the Royal Academy Schools from 30 July 1907 to July 1910.

He joined the firm of 'Arts and Crafts' in Shanghai, China in 1920. He later opened his own sculpture, ornamental plaster and metal work studio and workshop in Shanghai.

William Wagstaff also contributed to the Deptford War Memorial . He created two figures of servicemen and collaborated with the builder Richards on the central octagonal shaft in Portland stone.
