= Hang Seng Bank Tower =

Building in Shanghai, China

Coordinates: 31.242265°N 121.502671°E

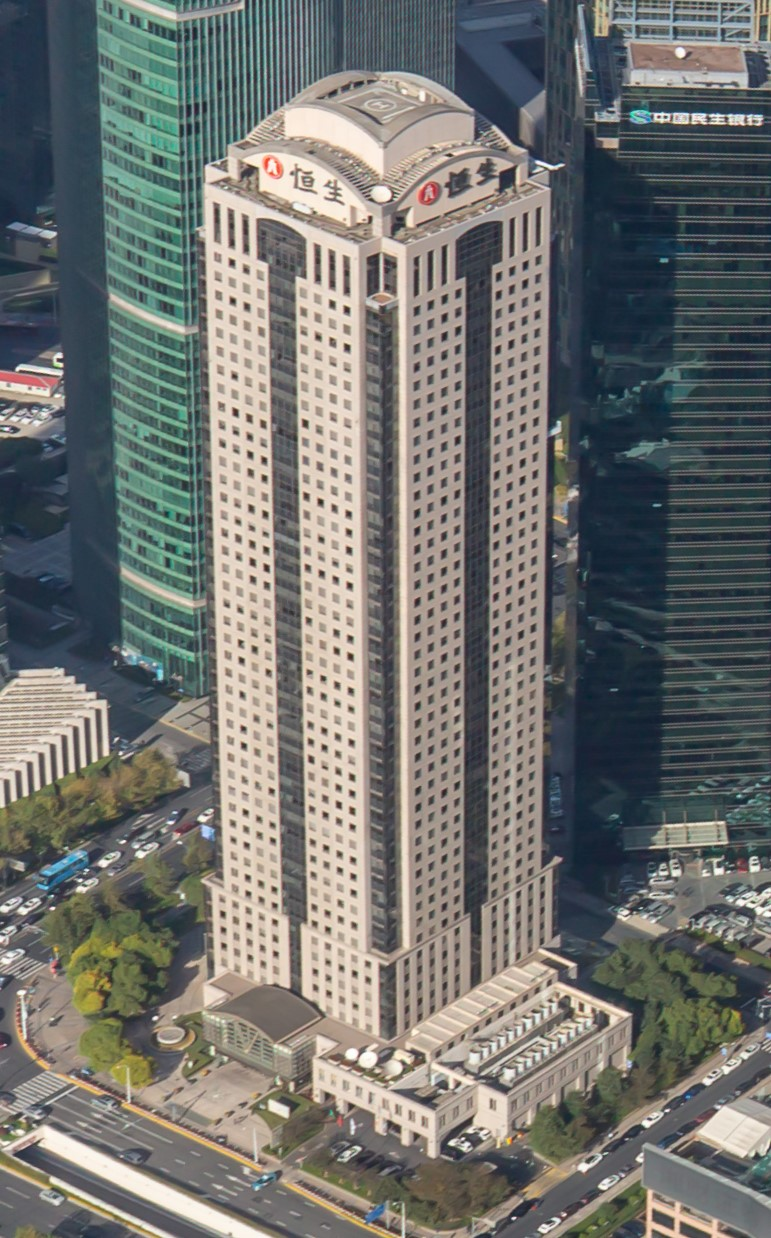
Viewed from Shanghai Tower in 2019

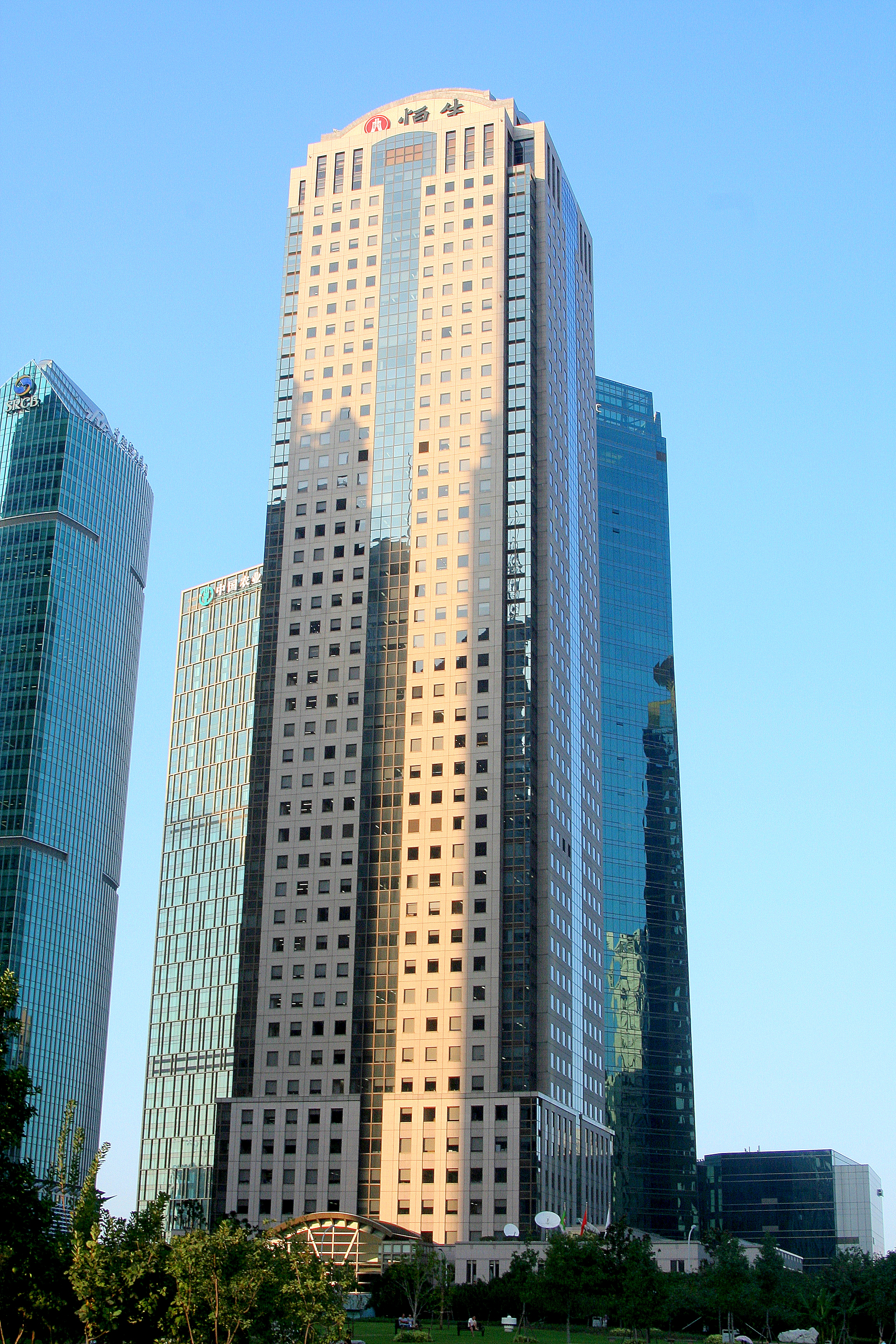
The building's exterior in 2012

Hang Seng Bank Tower is the headquarters of Hang Seng Bank in Shanghai. Built in 1998, the 46 story, 203 m high tower is located in Lujiazui, Pudong, Shanghai. Until 2010, it was known as "HSBC Tower" due to being the headquarters of HSBC Bank (China) Company Limited. HSBC Bank (China)'s headquarters moved to Shanghai IFC in 2010. It was originally known as the Shanghai Sen Mao International Building.

== See also ==
- HSBC Building
