= Hyderabad Bicycling Club =

Bicycling Organization in Hyderabad

- Logo of Hyderabad Bicycling Club, 2009
- Formation: 2007
- Purpose: Bicycling
- Location: Hyderabad, Telangana, India
- Organiser: DV Manohar
- Former organisers: Shay Mandel; Danika Durant
- Website: Official website Official Blog
- Remarks: Major Events: Enduro_{3} race, 6–8 February 2009 (3 teams participated); Cross-country race, 29 March 2009 (30 members participated)

The Hyderabad Bicycling Club (HBC) is a bicycling club for riders in Hyderabad, Telangana, India. Founded by Krishna Vadi in 2007, the club has now emerged as the world’s largest cycling club, overtaking the Denver Front Range Cycling Club, USA. It has grown over the years to reach its current membership strength of over 7,500 members and 2,800 members on Facebook. It has bike stations at Gachibowli and Necklace Road. UN-Habitat agreed to partner with HBC in its unique initiatives to promote cycling in India. HBC is a founding member of the World Cycling Alliance and an associate member of the European Cyclists Federation. HBC tied up with GHMC, Hyderabad Metro Rail, TSIIC and the Traffic Police to promote the "Cycle to Work" initiative in a big way in Cyberabad area to substantially reduce vehicular pollution and traffic congestion there.

== Members ==
The club consists of expatriates, NRI's who have relocated their base to India, and local Hyderabadis who have a passion for cycling. The club is open for people to all ages, professions, and sexes.

The former organizer of the club was Shay Mandel, an experienced cyclist who has been cycling internationally for more than twenty years. Under his patronage, the club grew to a very large group of people, who now ride together regularly. He stressed the need for a balanced cycling regime, including power, endurance, and speed-building rides. The members also get technical lessons on biking, bike maintenance, and other useful tips from the organizer.

Currently, the Hyderabad Bicycling Club proudly boasts over 2000 members from the Twin Cities of Hyderabad and Secunderabad and their suburbs. The Hyderabad Bicycling Club, in association with the GHMC (Greater Hyderabad Municipal Corporation-Govt. of Telangana), has set up its own "HBC Bike Station" on Necklace Road, having 30 hybrid bikes, 30 MTB bikes, 10 tandem bikes, 15 road bikes, and 15 kid bikes. These bicycles can be used by any person for a nominal fee per day on the main road.

== Chapters ==
Due to Hyderabad’s size, the club operates two chapters: the HITEC City chapter and the Secunderabad chapter. Each chapter has ride leaders who organize regular rides, typically on a weekly basis.

The riding starting point varies for each ride, and is designated on the club's meetup website.

== Media coverage ==
The activities of the club and its members have been regularly covered in the media. Following are few of the mentions:

- Pedal Power: You & I magazine published this article in its issue #52, January 2009 edition on page #54. This article summarized the activities of the group and talked about its unique existence.
- Pedaling away to heart’s content: The national daily newspaper, The Hindu, published an article in its main paper on the 2nd page, on 19 February 2009. This led to a lot of new riders joining the club.
- Cycling for the cause of environment: The Hindu newspaper also published an article about Shrenik Rao, a member of the club, who cycled across the length of India, for the cause of environment.
- Reachout Hyderabad had an article published on the Hyderabad Cyclathon.
- Happy Roadies: Hyderabad Cyclathon held to promote cycling in Hyderabad had pictures of the club members published on the daily newspaper, The Deccan Chronicle, on its second last page.
- Cross-Country Cycling race: The first ever cross-country cycling race conducted by HBC in Hyderabad had an article and pictures of the race and club members published on the daily newspaper, The Deccan Chronicle's primary supplement Hyderabad Chronicle, on its front page.
- Eenadu cover story: The local Telugu daily Eenadu had a cover story about the club activities. Publishing of this story resulted in a huge influx of cycling enthusiasts joining the club in a short span of time.
- ODE coverage: Monthly magazine, Of Distinct Expressions (ODE), had a main article published in their April issue citing the club and its members. It elaborated on the club's activities, its aims and achievements.
- Cool techies cycle to work: The English daily’s primary supplement, Hyderabad Chronicle, had an article covering the members of the club on its front page.
- Pedal Power: The main article in the Sunday portion of the paper covered a story about all the existing bicycling clubs in India. HBC, its organizer and its activities were mentioned in the article.
- Ride with the Wind: The information site covered a main page article on the existence of club in Hyderabad and elaborated on its activities.
- A healthy toast to freedom: An article about the freedom ride preparation by HBC members in Hyderabad.
- Eenadu story of Narsapur ride: The local Telugu daily Eenadu had a story about the club members maiden ride to Narsapur forests in the Medak district which covered a loop of 100 km.
- In honor of World Environment Day 2023, G20 participants who are in the city for a health meeting rode bicycles at the Palapitta cycling park.

== Events ==
=== Enduro_{3} Adventure race ===
HBC Teams in Enduro_{3} race (L-R): Sudhanshu, Ankit, Isha, Nileema, Satish, Sandeep, Sunil, Shilpa and Shay

Enduro_{3} is the only adventure race held in India, and combines various activities of cycling, trekking, rowing, orienteering and river crossing. This race is one of the most difficult races held in India, where less than 40% of the participating teams are able to complete the race successfully.

The race mandates a team of 3 members, with at least one female member. HBC had sent 3 teams for the adventure race, namely:

1. Team HBC Beacon: Shilpa Garg, Shay Mandel, Sunil Menon (leader)
2. Team HBC Quake3: Nileema Shingte, Bachina Satish, Sandeep Pathak (leader)
3. Team HBC Sharkies: Isha Arkatkar, Sudhanshu Mohanty, Ankit Kumar (leader)

All the HBC teams successfully completed the race.

=== Cross-Country Cycling race ===
HBC conducted the first ever cross-country cycling race in Hyderabad on 29 March 2009. Held in the picturesque background of Hyderabad Central University, the race attracted 30 participants, covering a distance of 15 km in 3 laps. The race trail included flat roads, muddy tracks, rocky mountains and water crossing. The motive of the race was to promote cycling amongst people, to voice the concern for the ailing environment and to raise awareness about maintaining fitness in the sedentary lifestyles.

The race attracted people of all ages, professions, and sex, and was a huge success.
