= Houston Boychoir =

American choir

The Houston Boychoir (HBC) is a non-profit, independent vocal training, and music education organization in Greater Houston, Texas, US.

== History ==
Established in 1962 as The Singing Boys of Houston by the Houston Independent School District, Houston Boychoir became an independent arts organization in 1991. The Houston Boychoir has been featured with Houston's major performing arts organizations including the Houston Symphony Orchestra, Houston Bach Society and Opera in the Heights, and Hope Stone Dance. HBC has performed before audiences at the Texas Music Educators Association annual conference and at Carnegie Hall, performing the Mass of the Children conducted by the composer John Rutter.

Houston Boychoir takes part in projects such as the Illumination Project, the Pink Ribbons Project, and the Fire Fighter's Foundation, as well as the creation of a larger collaborative project with Texas Children's Hospital in a work called Ode to My Nurses.

Singing members in all three groups wear uniforms when performing. The Preparatory Choir's formal attire consists of a button-down, light-blue, long-sleeved shirt, grey pants, a black belt with a gold buckle, and black shoes. The members of the Chamber Choir distinguish themselves by wearing a dark blue blazer with a white shirt and striped tie. The Alumni Choir's uniform is the same as the Chamber Choir except that the Alumni Choir gets to choose its own ties.

== Performances ==
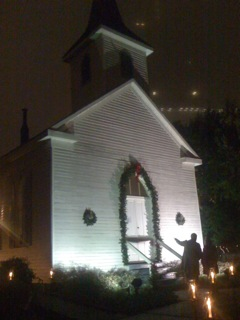
St. John Evangelical Lutheran Church, in downtown Houston, where the boys sang numerous blocks of melodies for a continuous flow of groups of visitors, during a span of several hours. (2009).

Both groups - the Chamber Choir (occasionally with the alumni choir). Olde Boys and the Preparatory Choir- have performed in a number of venues in Texas, including the Opera House at The Rebecca and John J. Moores School of Music, and various churches; the Chamber Boychoir also has performed internationally. Among the best-known annual performances of the Preparatory Boychoir in Houston, "The Candlelight Evening", nearing Christmas, takes place at the Sam Houston Park, where, in the historic St. John Church built in 1891, the boys wear a more traditional choir attire. December 2010 marked the 48th year of the Houston Heritage Society's Candlelight Evening, an event in which the boy choir has participated since its inauguration.

Another annual event is known as the 'Winter Concert' which takes place at St. Martin's Episcopal Church of Houston. On May 16, 2011, at the Moores Opera House, the Houston Boychoir performed for the 56th consecutive year of their 'Spring Concert'. Among other performances, the Prep-Boychoir has traveled to Austin, Texas to perform next to the Austin Choir, and in January 2011, the Houston Boychoir and the American Boychoir performed at Christ the King Evangelical Lutheran Church, in Houston; the Directors of both choirs were interviewed on KUHF FM radio, which has broadcast live performances of the singing boys. The choir performed as a special guest with the Houston Bach Society in April 2011

The Houston Boychoir has sung the "Star Spangled Banner" at several Astros games, and a few Rocket and Dynamo games.
