= HSBC Building, the Bund =

Building in the Bund, Shanghai, China

Coordinates: 31.2379°N 121.4851°E

HSBC Building
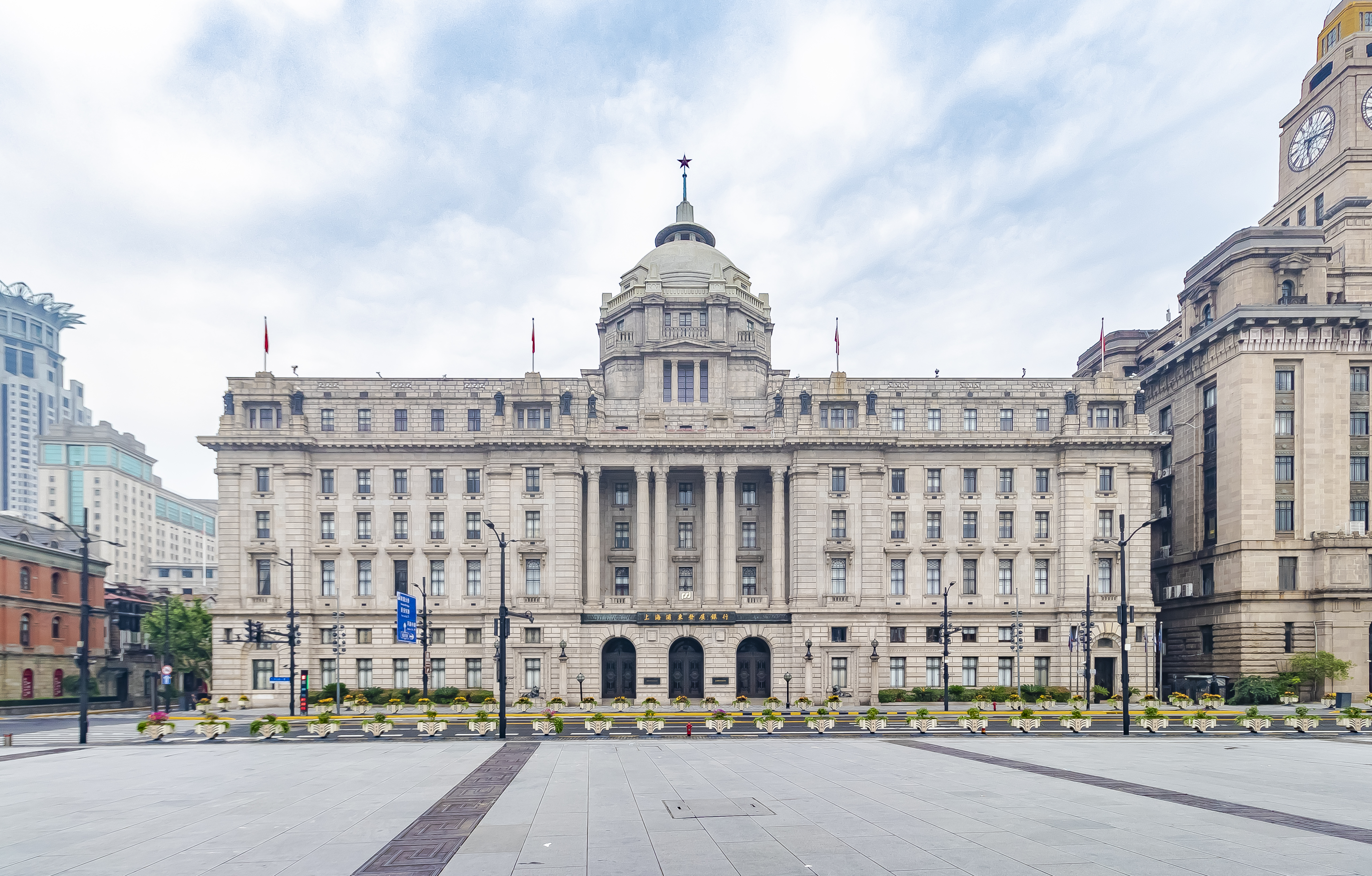
- HSBC Building during the day, 2021
- Interactive map of the HSBC Building area

General information
- Architectural style: Neoclassical
- Location: 12 Zhongshan Road, Shanghai, China
- Construction started: 1921
- Completed: 1923
- Owner: SPD Bank

Design and construction
- Architect: Palmer & Turner

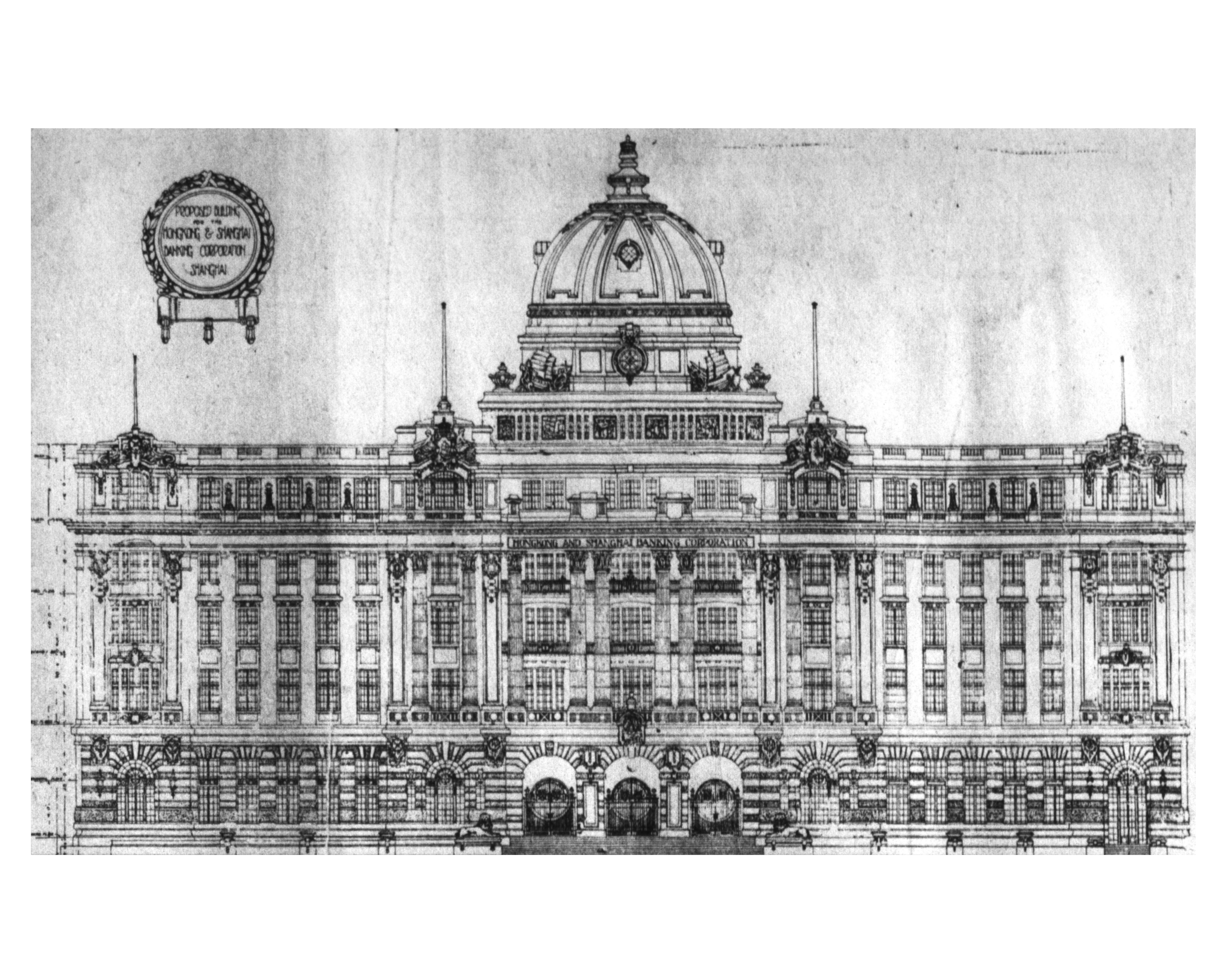
Elevation drawn by the architects

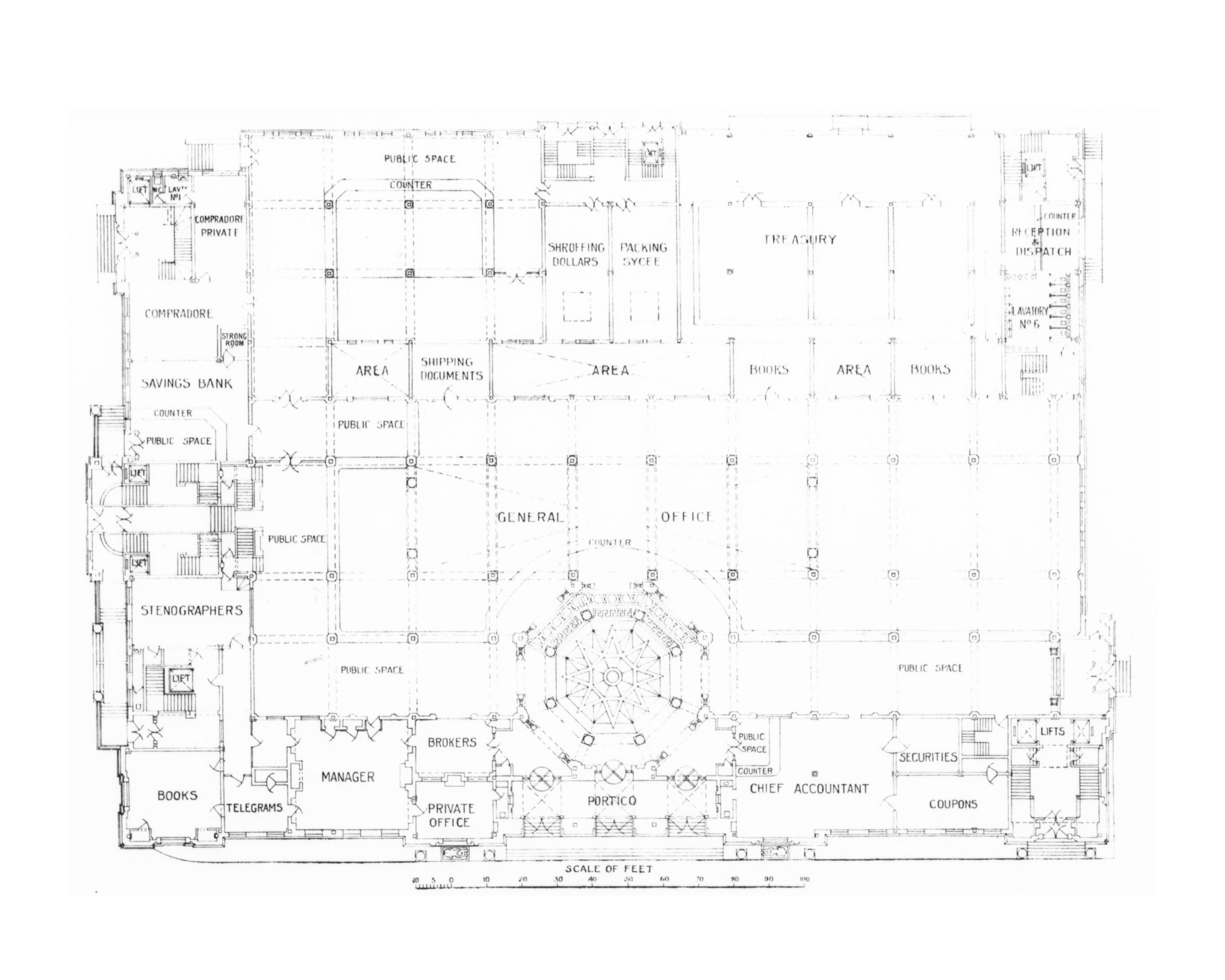
Ground floor plan

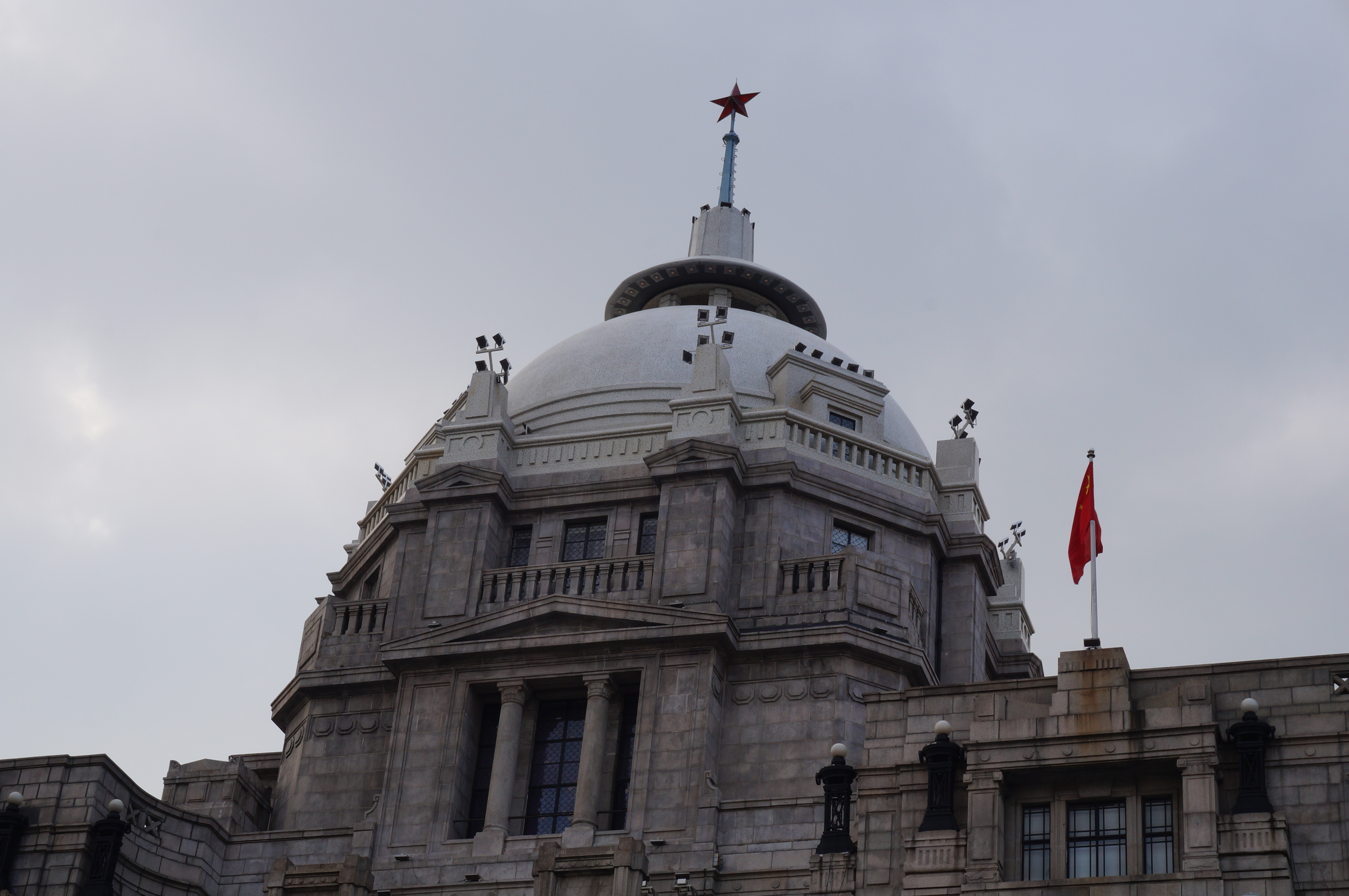
The dome of the building

The HSBC Building (also known as the Municipal Government Building) is a six-floor neo-classical building in the Bund area of Shanghai, China. It served as the headquarters of the Shanghai branch of The Hongkong and Shanghai Banking Corporation from 1923 to 1955, and currently houses the Shanghai Pudong Development Bank (SPD Bank). The building is situated at number 12, the Bund. Designed by the British architecture firm Palmer & Turner architects and surveyors, construction of the building lasted from 5 May 1921 to 23 June 1923.

== Layout ==
The HSBC Building has been called "the most luxurious building from the Suez Canal to the Bering Strait". The building has a floor area of 23,415 square metres (252,040 sq ft), and was, at the time, the largest bank building in the Far East, and second largest in the world, after the Bank of Scotland building in Edinburgh.

The building exterior adopted a strict neo-classicist design, with a tripartite vertical and horizontal division. In the centre is a dome, the base decorated with a triangular structure in imitation of Greek temples. Below that are six Ionic columns penetrating from the second to the fourth storey. The main structure is five storeys, the central section seven storeys, with one and a half storey for the basement. The main structure has a steel lattice with brick filling, and a granite exterior.

The interior was luxuriously decorated, using materials such as marble and monel. The whole building was fitted with heating and air-conditioning. The main trading hall has four columns hewn from whole blocks of marble, which was at the time unique in Asia.

Behind the main building is a subsidiary building which houses bank offices, safes, and vaults.

== History ==
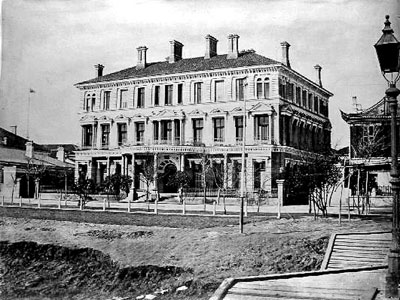
The old HSBC Building in 1886

On 4 March 1865, HSBC opened its Shanghai branch on the ground floor of the Central Hotel (now Peace Hotel) on the corner of the Bund with Nanjing Road.

By 1874, HSBC's business had grown so much that the existing premises was becoming cramped. The bank then purchased the Foreign Club, a three-storey building at number 12, the Bund, south of the Customs House, for 60,000 taels of silver.

In 1912, the bank made further acquisitions at number 10 and number 11, the Bund, and began construction of the new building. Construction began on 5 May 1921, with the dome capped off on 23 June 1923. According to contemporary press reports, at the time of construction the bank hired feng shui masters to select the time and direction of the first excavation. In accordance with Chinese tradition, coins from around the world were buried in the foundations. Specially minted coins were placed in dark recesses of the building to ward off spirits. The construction took 25 months, and the completed building occupied 1.3 hectares, with an area of 23,415 m^{2}. The architect's firm, Palmer & Turner, also designed numerous other buildings on the Bund including the Yokohama Specie Building, Yangtze Insurance Building, and Bank of China Building.

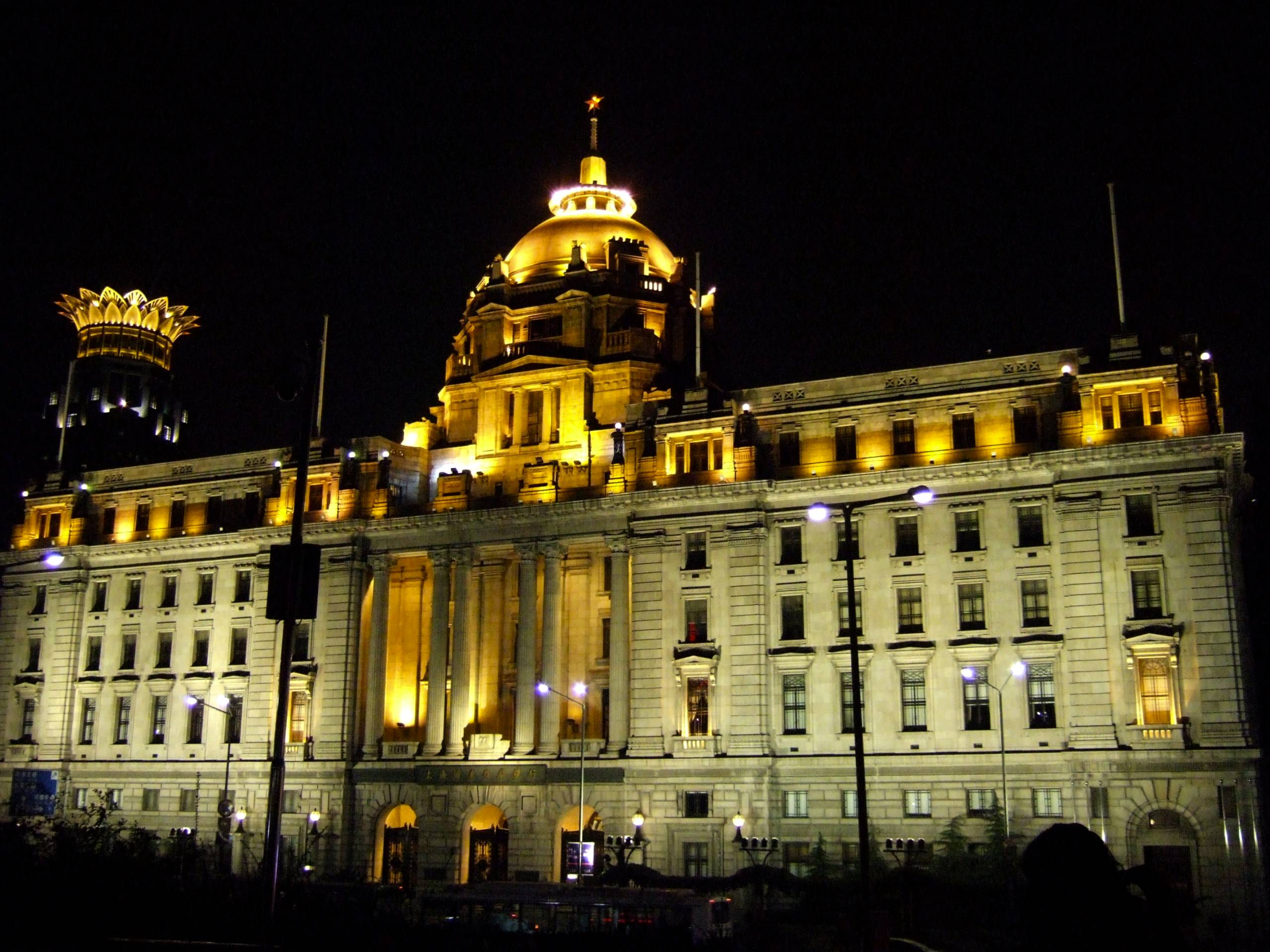
HSBC Building at night

During the Second World War, the HSBC building was occupied by the Japanese Yokohama Specie Bank. HSBC moved back at the end of the war.

The Communists took over Shanghai in 1949. HSBC continued to operate in the relative freedom of the early years of the People's Republic. However, in 1955 the political situation led the bank to scale down its operations in Shanghai. The building was handed over to the government, and HSBC rented separate offices nearby. Later in that year, the Shanghai Municipal Government moved into the building. The building's name was changed to "The People's Government of the Municipality of Shanghai Building", or "Municipal Government Building" for short. The subsidiary building housed the Municipal Archives from 1956.

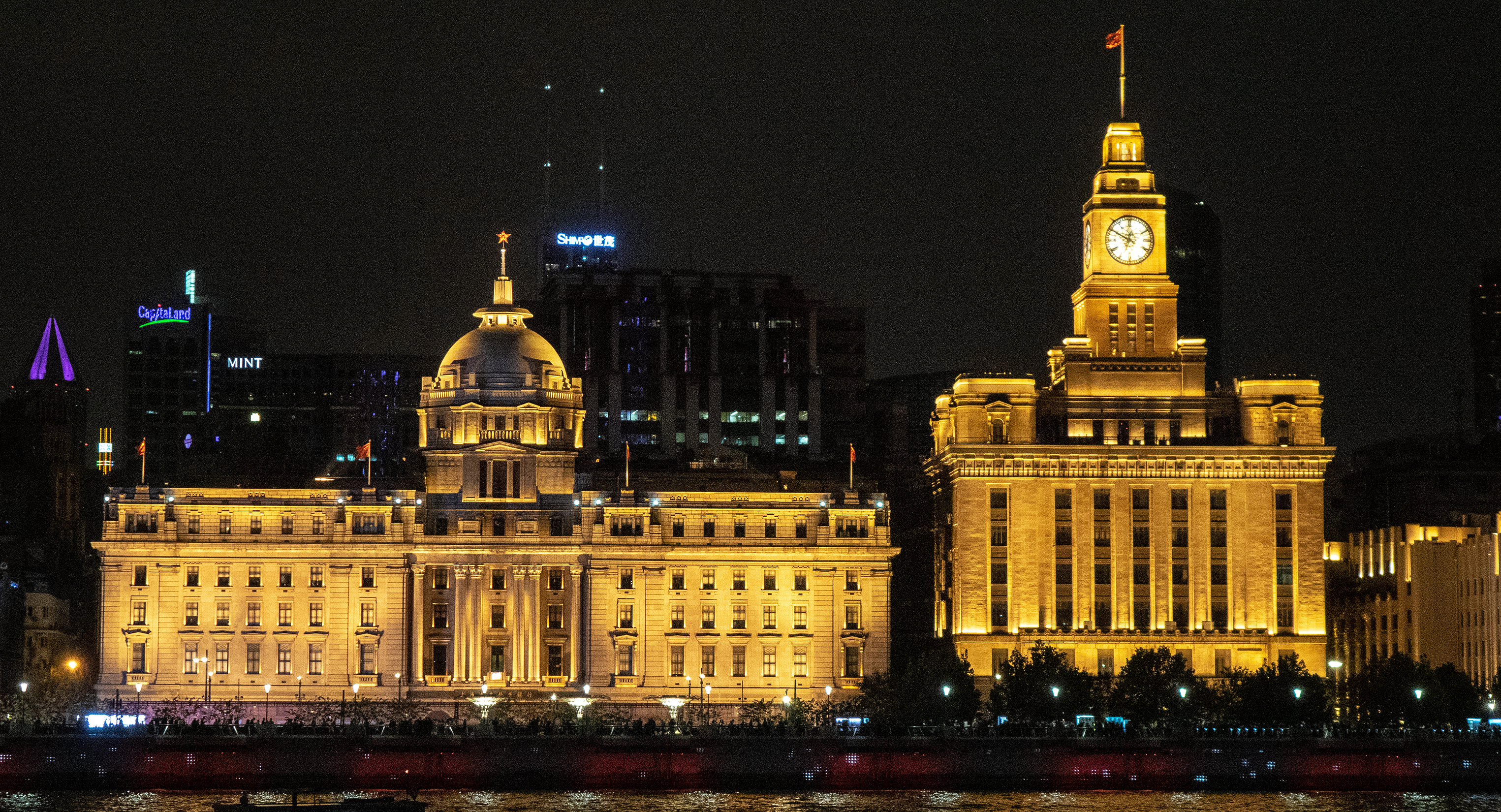
The HSBC building next to the new Customs House built in 1927

In 1990, the Municipal Government began moving civic institutions out of the Bund in favour of commercial institutions. HSBC made contact with the Municipal Government on repurchasing the building, but negotiations failed due to price reasons.

In 1995, the Municipal Government moved out of the building, and the SPD Bank obtained the lease to the building. During renovations, spectacular murals were uncovered in the building. HSBC's Chinese office is currently headquartered at HSBC Building, Shanghai IFC.

== Bronze lions ==
The bank commissioned two bronze lions from the United Kingdom at the time of construction, to be placed outside the front doors flanking the entrance staircase. They were cast by J W Singer & Sons in the English town of Frome, to a design by Henry Poole RA. One of the lions is depicted roaring, to symbolise protection, the other is calm, and symbolises security. Affectionately nicknamed Stephen and Stitt (after A G Stephen, once Manager Shanghai and the driving force behind the construction of the building, and by then the Bank's Chief Manager; and G H Stitt, Stephen's successor as Manager Shanghai, and the incumbent when the building was opened on 23 June 1923). An in-joke: Stephen's was said to be the louder character, Stitt the quieter man.

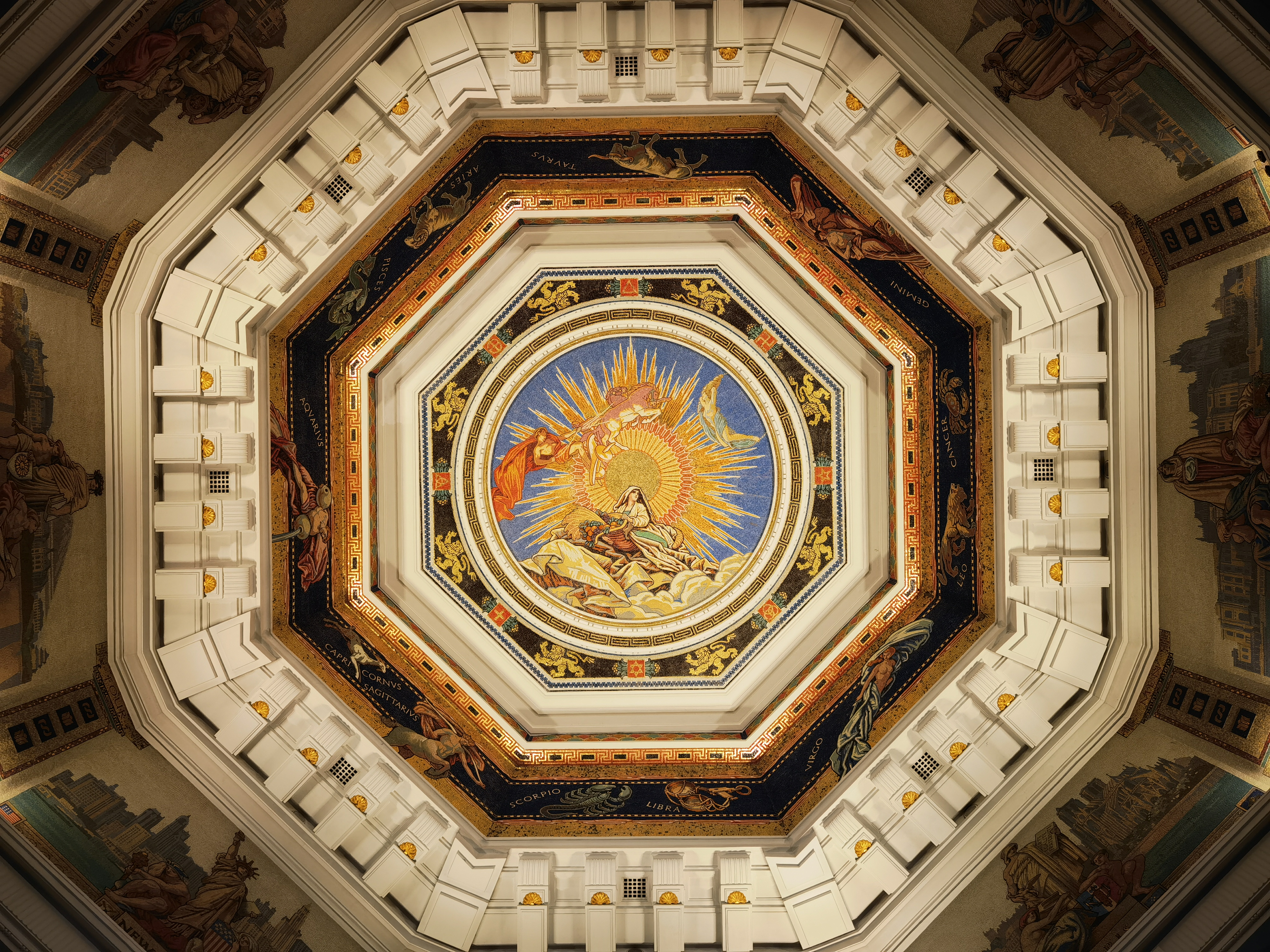
The Hongkong and Shanghai Banking Corporation building's ceiling, a delicate mosaic.

These lions were the inspiration for a second and much larger pair to a completely new design by Shanghai-based British sculptor W W Wagstaff that were commissioned for the bank's new Headquarters in Hong Kong, opened in 1935. This second pair of lions was cast in Shanghai.

During the wartime occupation of Shanghai, the lions were removed by the Japanese to be melted down for their valuable bronze, but they escaped this fate and were restored after the end of the war. They were removed once again in 1966, during the Cultural Revolution. The Shanghai Artefact Administration Board stored the lions in the warehouse of the Shanghai Comedy Troupe. In 1980, they were handed over to the Shanghai Museum where they are on display today. In 1997, when the SPD Bank moved into the building, replicas were made and placed in front of the building.

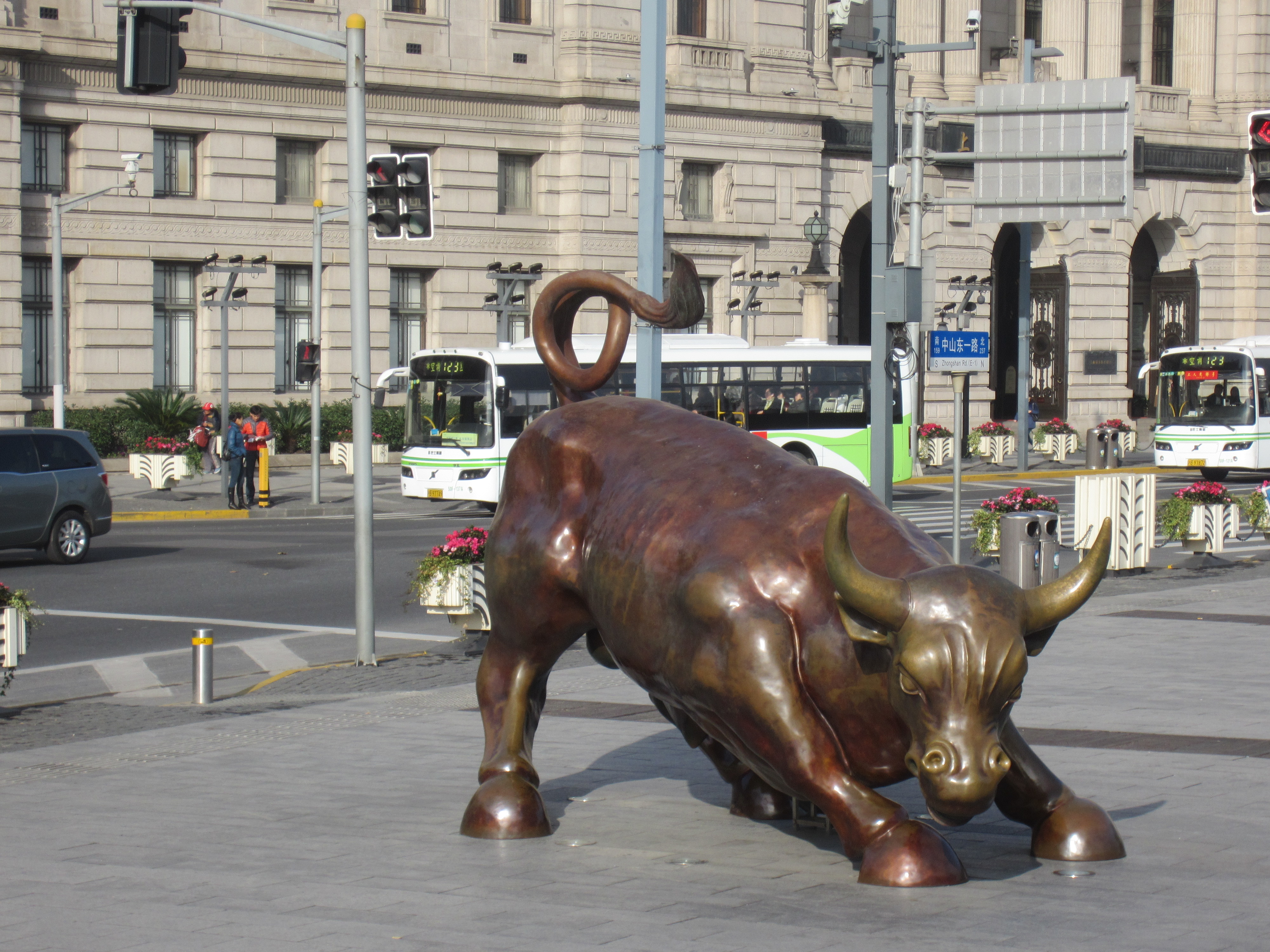
The Bund Financial Square features a bull statue (installed 2010) by sculptor Arturo Di Modica who also did the Wall Street Charging Bull in New York (from 1989).

== Dome mosaics ==
Near the ceiling of the octagonal entrance hall of the bank building were originally eight mosaic murals. The dome was decorated with frescos depicting the twelve signs of the zodiac, eight geometric shapes and eight lions, as well Apollo, Luna and Fortuna. An enterprising architect had the mosaics covered over in stucco and paint to save them in 1956. When the Soviet Navy decided to visit Shanghai in next year, the building was selected as a guest house, but the mosaics became the controversy, some people criticized these mosaics were "too commercialized" and "too Westernized" and thus suggested to destruct them. The president of the Shanghai Civil Architecture Institute, Chen Zhi (陈植), reviewed the mosaics and opposed to destruct, instead he proposed to cover them up, and his proposal was approved by government. In 1997, the mosaics were rediscovered, renovations uncovered them. The SPD Bank then funded the restoration, but changed the HSBC emblems in the paintings to the SPD Bank emblem and Magnolia denudata.

The eight murals depicted eight cities in which HSBC had branches. Each fresco featured a principal mythological figure, supported by personifications of local rivers and the city, with city scenery in the background.

- Shanghai: Mazu and two figures representing the Yellow River and Yangtze River in front of the scenery of the HSBC building and the old Customs House, on the base have the merchant ensigns of the Qing Dynasty and the United Kingdom.
- Hong Kong: A goddess wearing a mural crown and the Union Jack, along with two figures representing the Pearl River and South China Sea carrying a junk and a book writing MDCCCXLII, all in front of the Hong Kong Island, on the base have the flags of the Governor of Hong Kong and the Lord High Admiral.
- Tokyo: A goddess stand for "Studying" and two figures representing "Progressive" (carrying a shield with the Imperial Seal of Japan) and "Science" in front of the Tokyo Imperial Palace, government offices in Kasumigaseki and Mount Fuji, on the base have the national and imperial flags of Japan.
- London: Britannia, the patron saint of London carrying the coat of arms of the City of London, and the figure representing the River Thames in front of the scenery of London over the River Thames featuring the Westminster Palace and St Paul's Cathedral, on the base have the royal arms of England, Scotland and Ireland.
- New York: Statue of Liberty, Hermes and Columbia in front of the Manhattan, on the base have the American flag, the arms of New York City and a white-headed eagle bearing an olive branch and arrows.
- Bangkok: The goddess Fertility and figures representing "Work" and "Harvest" in front of the Chao Phraya River and the Grand Palace, on the base have the national flag and naval ensign of Thailand, and the national and royal arms of Thailand.
- Paris: Marianne carrying the motto LIBERTÉ, ÉGALITÉ, FRATERNITÉ, along with Nike and the patron saint carrying the arms of France in front of the Seine and Île de la Cité, on the base have two fleurs-de-lys and two coats of arms of Paris.
- Calcutta: Kali, a figure representing Ganges and a figure carrying the arms of Calcutta in front of the scenery of Calcutta over the Ganges, on the base have lions and little egrets.

== See also ==
- Hang Seng Bank Tower
- HSBC Building (Hong Kong)
