= Shanghai IFC =

Skyscraper in Shanghai, China

Shanghai International Finance Center
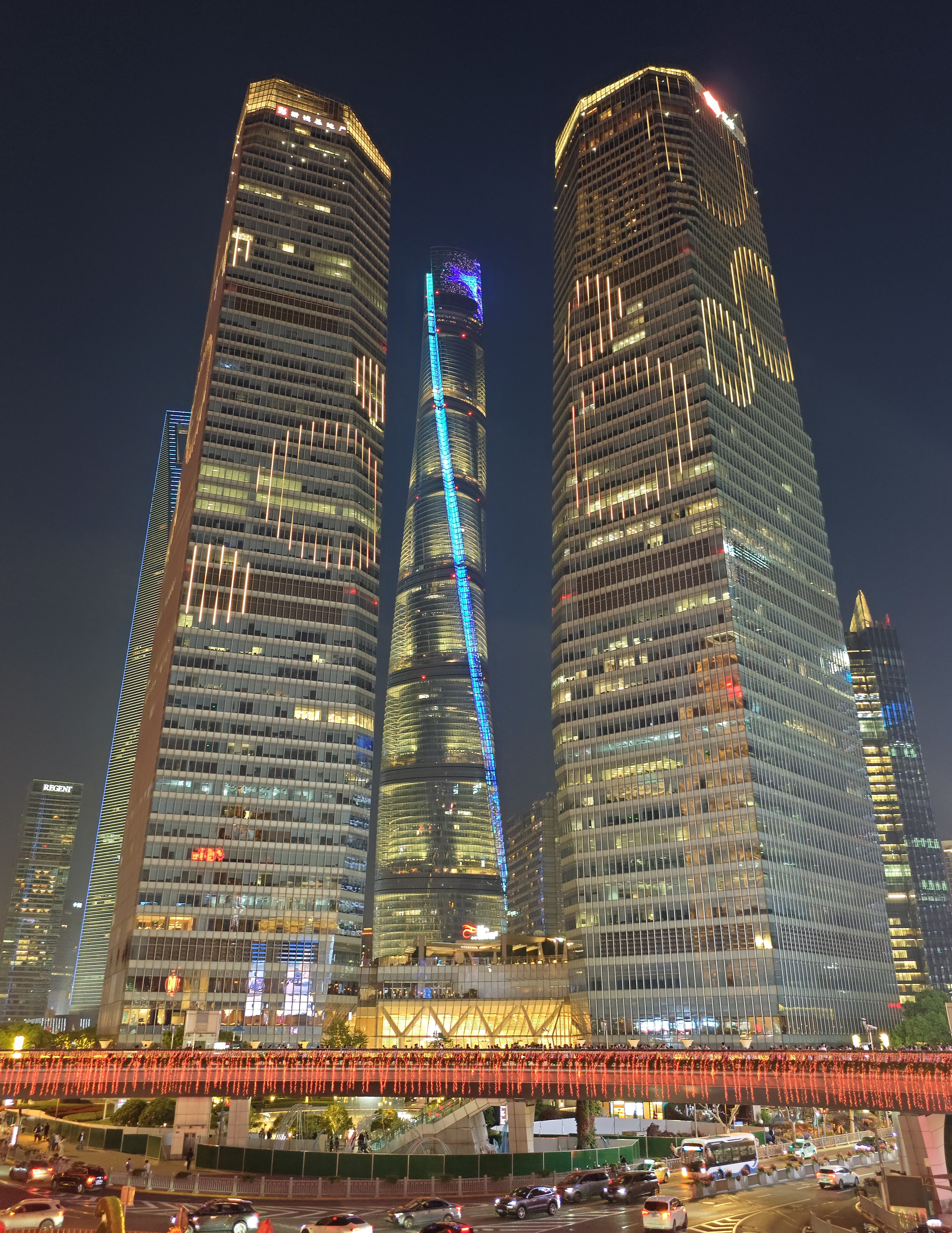
- Shanghai IFC North and South buildings at night in 2026 (with Shanghai Tower in the background).
- Interactive map of the Shanghai International Finance Center area

General information
- Status: Completed
- Location: 8 Century Avenue, Pudong, Shanghai, China
- Coordinates: 31.2385°N 121.497°E
- Construction started: 2006
- Completed: 2009 (South Tower); 2010 (North Tower)
- Opened: 1 January 2011; 15 years ago
- Inaugurated: 1 January 2011

Height
- Architectural: 249.9 metres (820 ft) (South Tower); 259.9 metres (853 ft) (North Tower)

Design and construction
- Architect: Cesar Pelli & Associates Architects

Chinese name
- Traditional Chinese: 上海國際金融中心
- Simplified Chinese: 上海国际金融中心
Transcriptions
Standard Mandarin
- Hanyu Pinyin: Shànghǎi Guójì Jīnróng Zhōngxīn

Shanghai IFC
- Traditional Chinese: 上海國金中心
- Simplified Chinese: 上海国金中心
Transcriptions
Standard Mandarin
- Hanyu Pinyin: Shànghǎi Guójīn Zhōngxīn

Shanghai International Finance Center, usually abbreviated as Shanghai IFC, is a commercial building complex and a shopping center (branded Shanghai IFC mall) in Shanghai. It incorporates two tower blocks at 249.9 metres (820 ft) (south tower) and 259.9 metres (853 ft) (north tower) housing offices and a hotel, and an 85-metre (279 ft) tall multi-storey building behind and between the two towers.

Shanghai IFC is located in Lujiazui, in Pudong, Shanghai. It occupies a prominent position southeast of the Lujiazui roundabout, diagonally across from the Oriental Pearl Tower and across the road from Super Brand Mall. It is adjacent to Lujiazui Station on Metro Line 2, and can be accessed directly from the underground station via a tunnel.

The south tower of Shanghai IFC and part of the multistorey building was completed in 2009, while the north tower and the rest of the complex was completed in 2010. Work continued for several years afterwards on peripheral aspects of the development, including landscaping and footbridge connections to nearby buildings and Lujiazui Central Park.

The Ritz-Carlton Hotel occupies the south tower, while the north tower houses the Shanghai headquarters of HSBC in China. Other prominent tenants of the complex include an Apple Store under the sunken forecourt of the building (topped by a cylindrical glass skylight rising from the forecourt), a multi-screen cinema, and a Citysuper supermarket. The remainder of the retail area is largely taken up by upscale chain restaurants and international luxury fashion brands.

Shanghai IFC, like its sister project the International Finance Centre in Hong Kong, was developed by Sun Hung Kai Properties.

== HSBC lions ==
Maintaining a tradition begun with the historic HSBC Building across the Huangpu River on the Bund, the front of the north tower features a pair of bronze lions, the fourth pair of copies of the original which once graced the bank's old Shanghai headquarters.

The original lions are now held by the Shanghai Historic Museum (which has no permanent home) and are separately on display at the museum's display room under the Oriental Pearl Tower and the Shanghai Banking Museum, both nearby in Lujiazui. The Shanghai IFC copies were cast from the copies outside HSBC's Hong Kong headquarters; the other two copies (outside HSBC's global headquarters in London and the historic HSBC Building in Shanghai) were cast from the Hong Kong copies and Shanghai originals respectively.

== Gallery ==
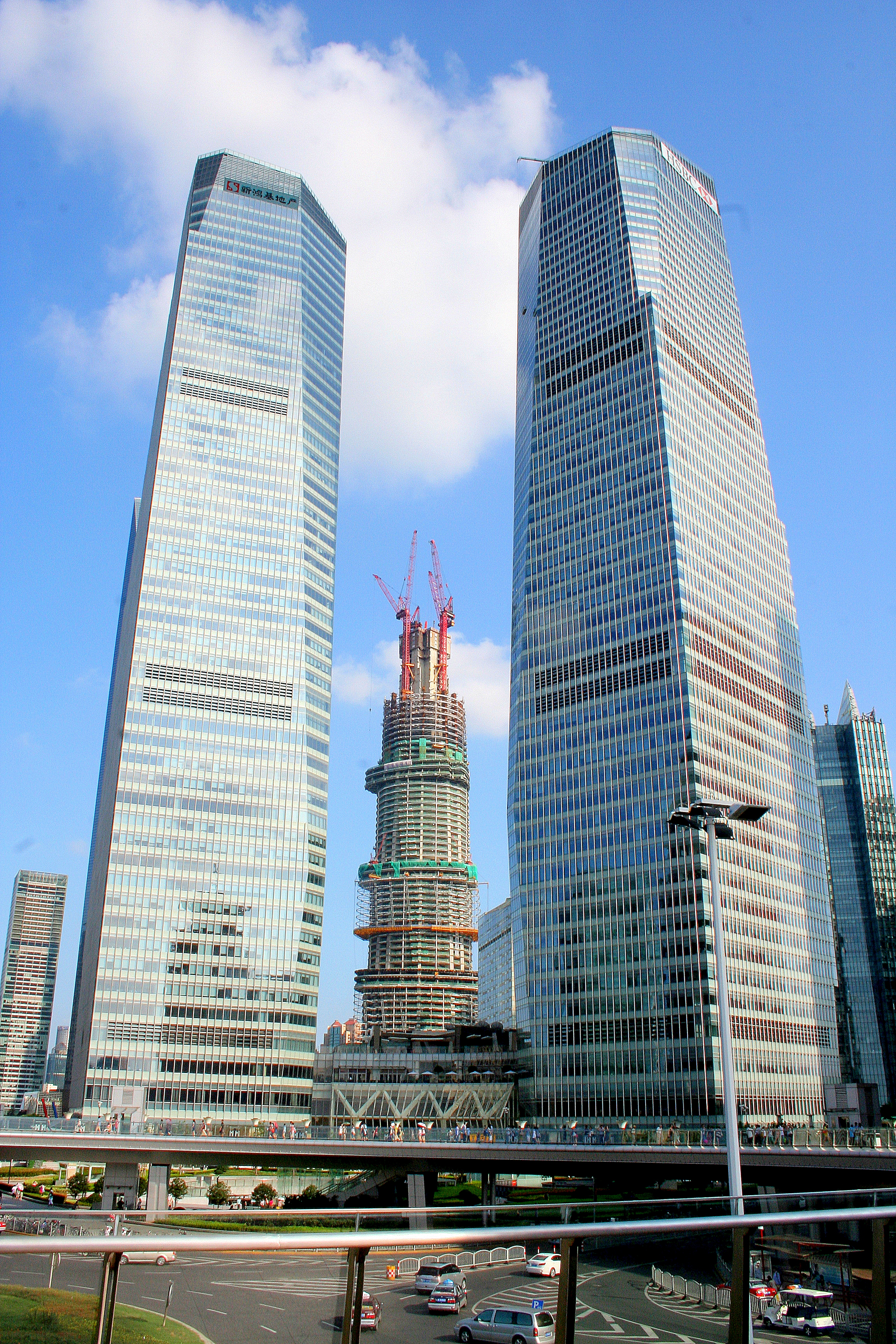
Shanghai IFC in 2012 (with Shanghai Tower under construction in the background).

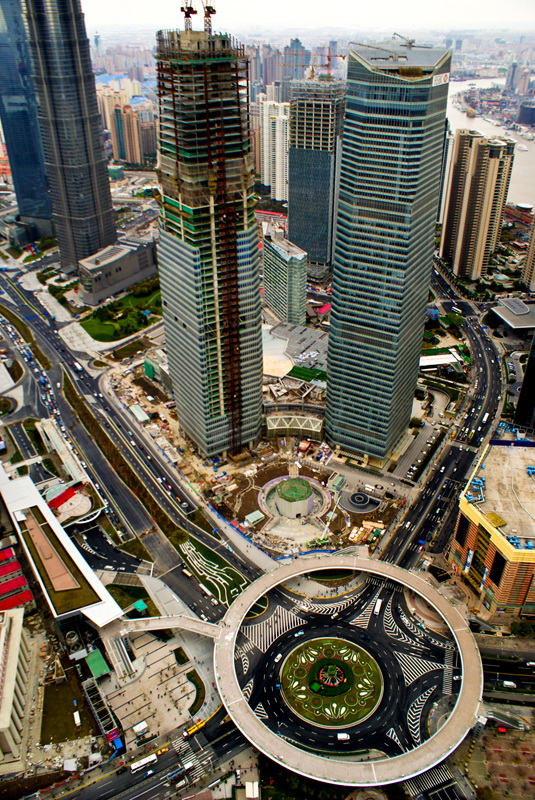
Shanghai IFC while under construction in April 2010

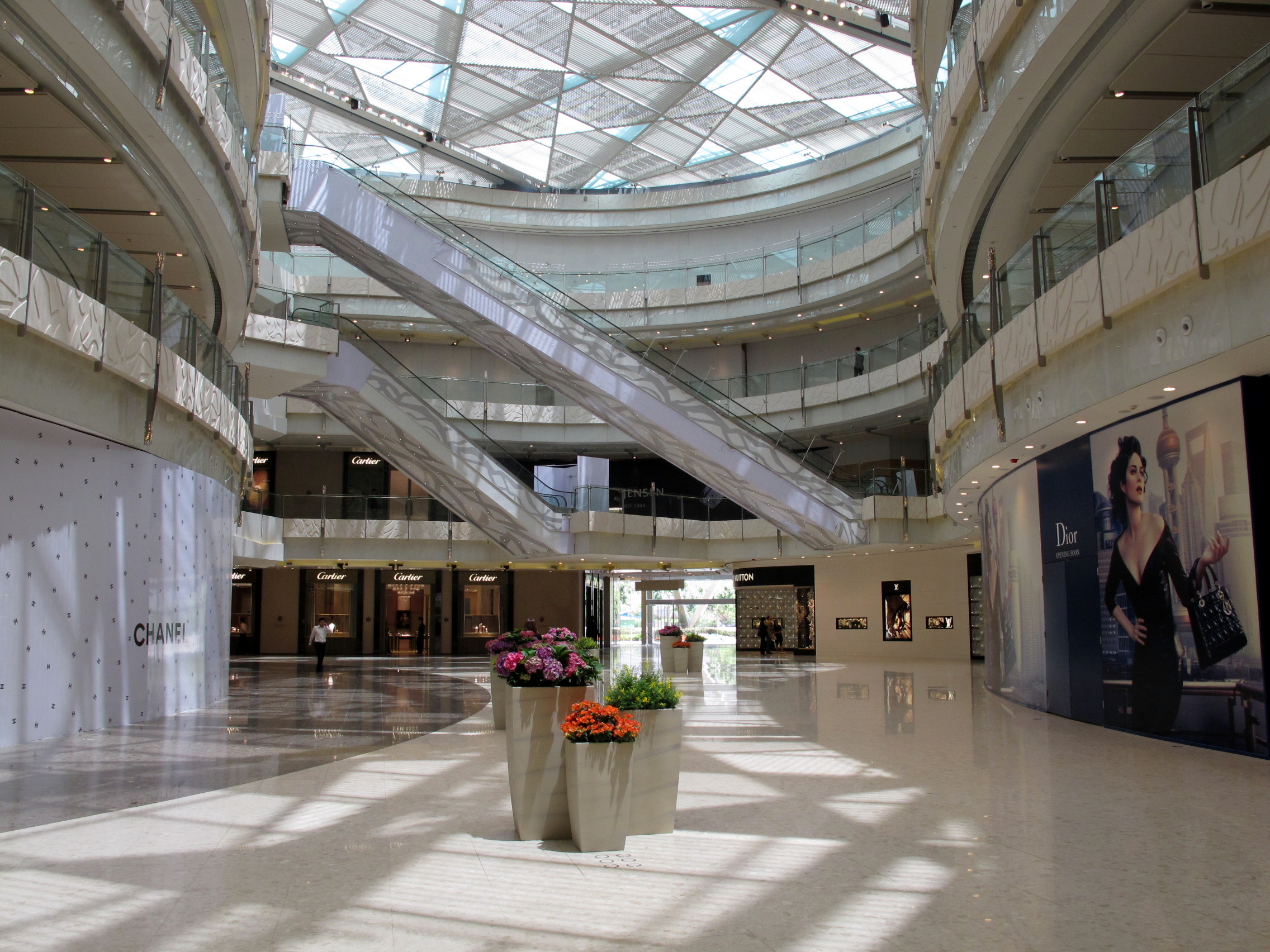
Shanghai International Finance Center Mall Atrium (May 2010)

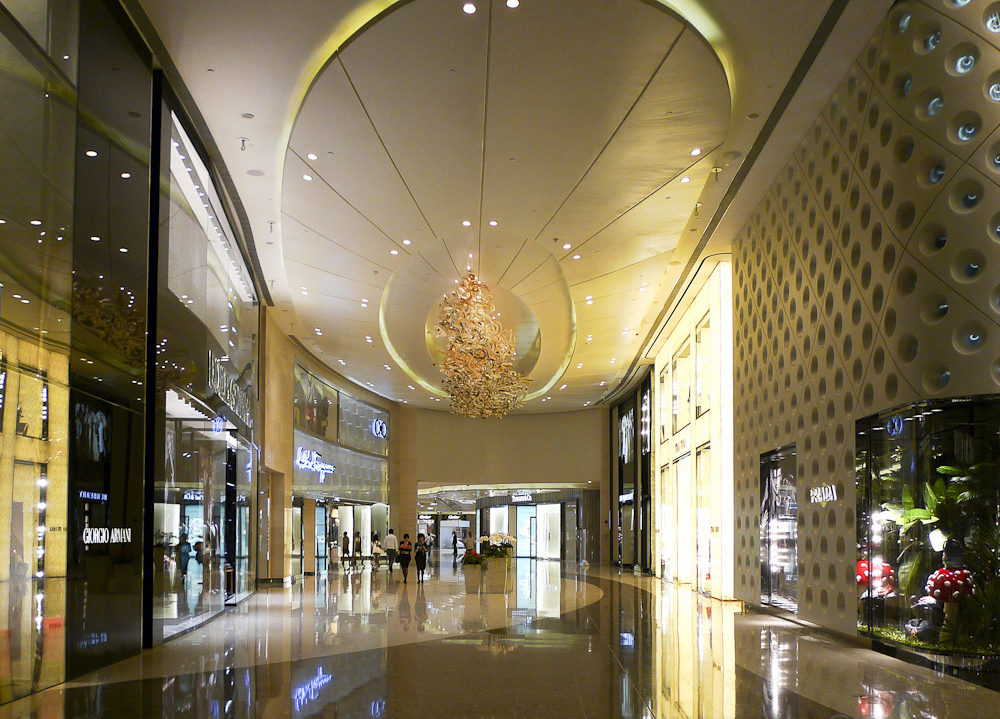
Avenue of Stars

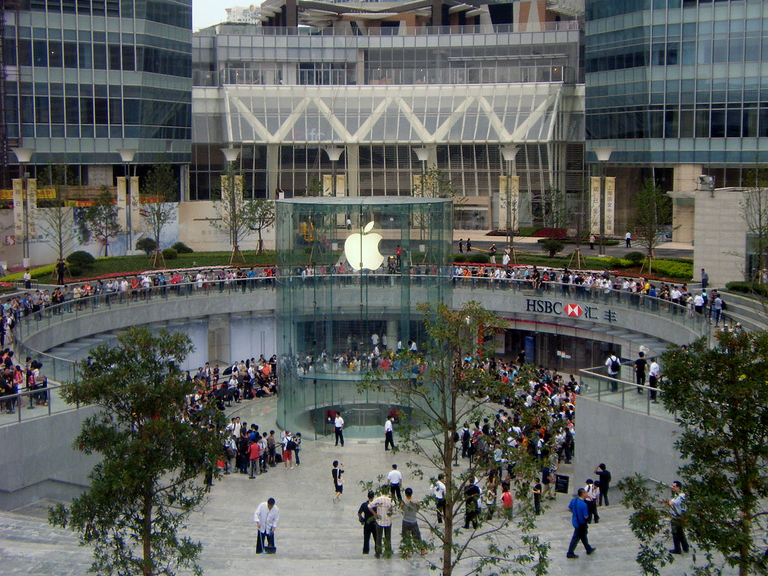
Apple Store in 2010

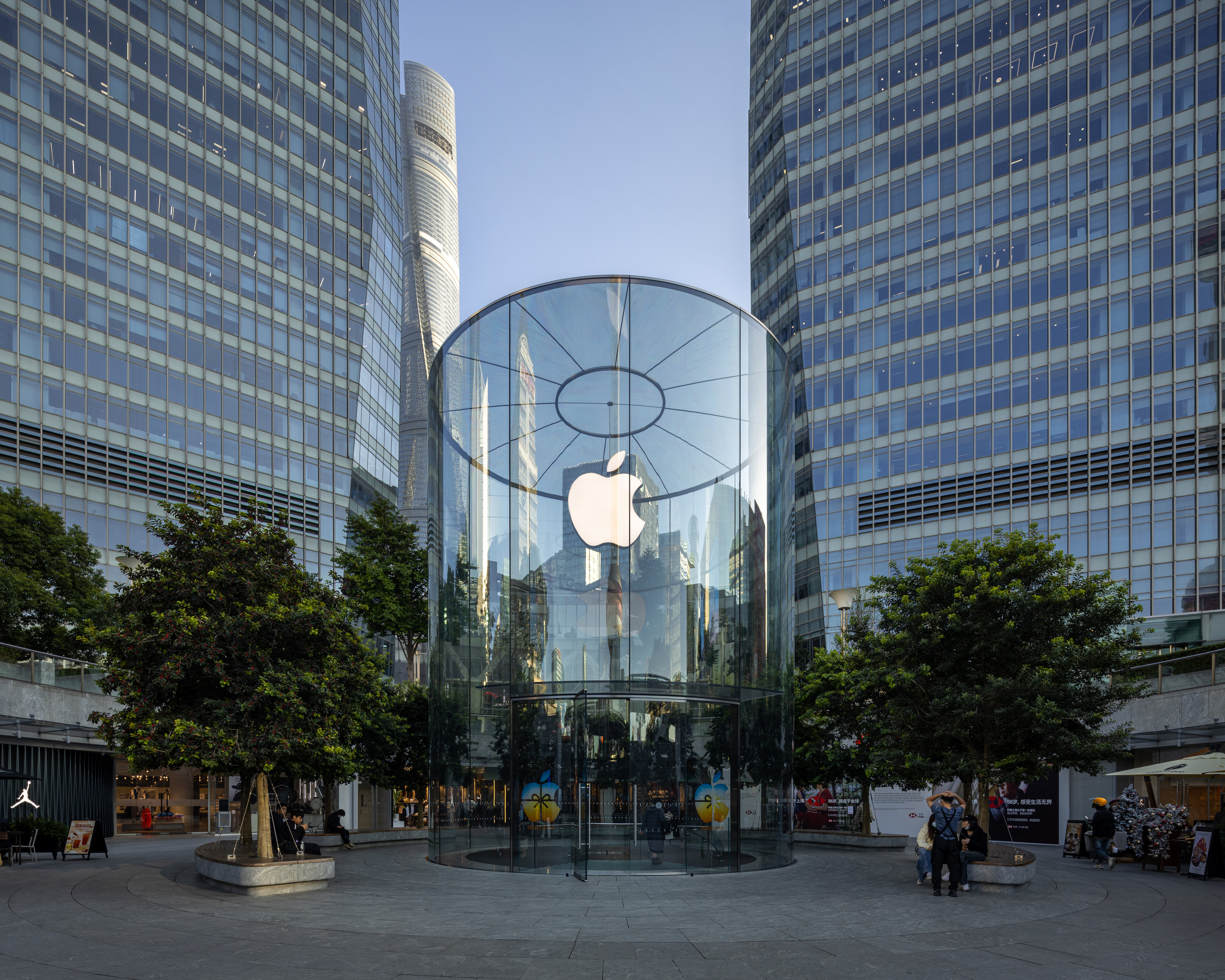
Apple Store in November 2025

== See also ==
- International Finance Centre (Hong Kong)
