= List of University of Salford people =

This is a list of University of Salford people, including staff (past and present) and alumni from the University of Salford.

== Notable staff ==
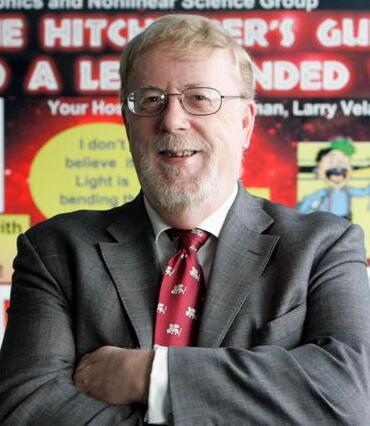
Allan Boardman

- Allan Boardman: Physics
- Ralph Darlington: Employment Relations
- Trevor Cox: Acoustic Engineering
- Garry Crawford: Cultural Sociology
- Said Faiq: Translation & Interpreting
- Neal Hazel: Criminology and Criminal Justice
- Andy Miah: Science Communication and Future Media
- Miklas Scholz: Water resources engineering
- Audrey Stuckes: Material science
- Ad De Jongh: Dentistry

== Notable alumni ==
=== Academia ===
- Michael Atchia: Mauritian academician, former Chief and Programme Director with the United Nations Environment Programme
- Sydney Chapman: British mathematician and geophysicist
- Robert Garner: professor of political theory at the University of Leicester
- Matt Goodwin: British political commentator and academic who stood for ReformUK in the 2026 Gorton and Denton by-election
- Adam Ledgeway: Professor of Italian and Romance Linguistics, Chair of the Faculty of Modern and Medieval Languages and Linguistics at the University of Cambridge
- Robert Lomas: writer, business studies and science academic, Freemasonry researcher
- Mary Mellor: Emeritus Professor of Sociology, Northumbria University
- Susan Price: Vice-Chancellor of Leeds Beckett University

=== Business ===
- Andy Bond: former Chief Executive of Asda
- Keith Ludeman: Chief Executive of the Go-Ahead Group
- Chris Moyes: former Chief Executive of the Go-Ahead Group
- Richard Parry-Jones: former group vice president-Global Product Development, and Chief Technical Officer, Ford Motor Company
- Mohammad Hashem Pesaran: British-Iranian economist
- Mohammed Rahif Hakmi: Chairman of Armada Group
- Kamaruddin Taib: Chairman of HSBC Bank Malaysia
- Rita Oyoku: Trade Commissioner of the Vanuatu to Nigeria

=== Media, entertainment and design ===
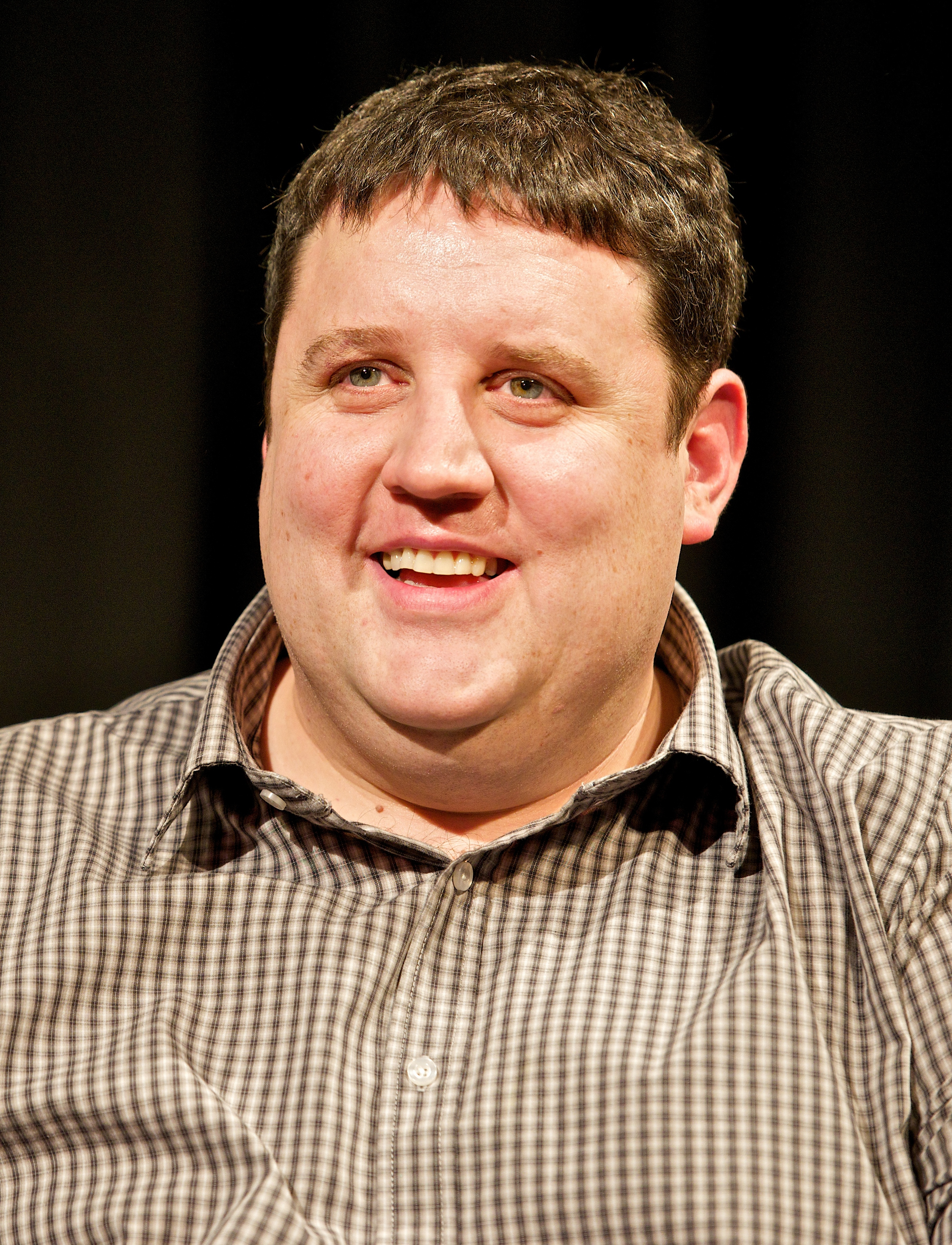
Peter Kay

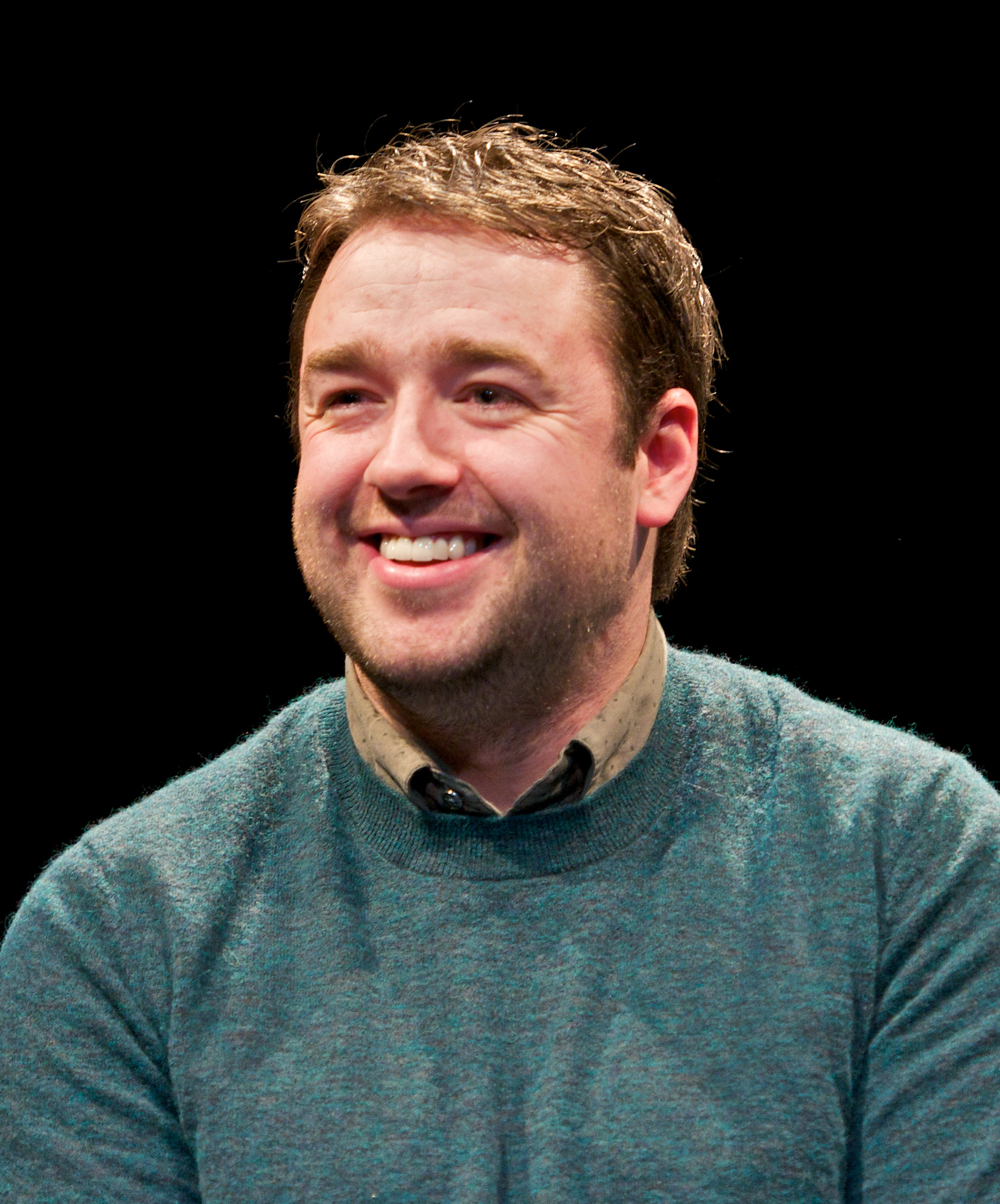
Jason Manford

- Jonathan Higgs: singer and song writer in the band Everything Everything
- Tom Short: comedian
- Sophie Abelson: actress
- Ross Adams: actor on BBC3 TV series The Gemma Factor
- Emma Atkins: actress
- Roma Babuniak: artist
- Chris Bisson: actor
- OJ Borg: radio and TV presenter
- Wes Butters: writer and radio broadcaster
- Nigel Clarke: Associate Composer to the Band of HM Grenadier Guards
- Sophia Di Martino: actress
- Andrew Diey: electronic musician, sound designer and record producer
- Jay Diggins: singer/songwriter
- Jason Done: actor
- Christopher Eccleston: actor
- Steve Edge: comedian and actor
- Yasmin Evans: TV and radio broadcaster
- Astor Fong: singer-songwriter, recording artist and record producer (studied Psychology)
- Liam Fray: lead singer and songwriter for Courteeners
- Stephen Fretwell: musician (studied at the university, but didn't complete)
- Honey G: rapper
- Sian Gibson: actress
- James Gourlay: conductor and internationally renowned tuba soloist
- Sarah Greene: TV presenter
- John Hammond: BBC weather presenter
- Joanna Higson: actress
- Rob James-Collier: actor
- Jon the Postman: punk rock singer; born Jon Ormerod
- Peter Kay: comedian
- Frances Lennon: artist
- John Vernon Lord: illustrator and author
- L. S. Lowry: artist, studied at the Salford Royal Technical College, was awarded the honorary degree of Doctor of Letters in 1975
- Karl Lucas: comedian, writer, actor
- Jason Manford: Manchester comedian and Perrier nominee
- Sarfraz Manzoor: writer, journalist and documentary maker
- Conor McNamara: football commentator for the BBC
- Kristyna Myles: singer-songwriter (studied Popular Music and Recording)
- Maxine Peake: actress
- Nigel Pivaro: former actor, Edinburgh Fringe First winner, producer, journalist; studied as mature student for honours degree in Con Military and International History, attaining 2.1
- Robert Powell: actor
- Jen Pringle: TV presenter on Channel 5 children's show Milkshake!
- Caroline Redman Lusher: singer/songwriter, founder and Director of Rock Choir
- John Robb: musician and journalist
- Samantha Siddall: actress
- Richard Smith: Scottish screenwriter and film director
- Rosie Smith: former keyboardist in Cradle of Filth
- Ash Soan: drummer
- Jim Sturgess: actor
- Dan Tiernan: comedian
- Kaye Wragg: actress
- Neil Yates: jazz and folk musician

=== Military ===
- Major General William Moore: 1976-79

=== Physiotherapy ===
The university has held a link for Physiotherapy with the Professional Footballers' Association since 1991. As of 2007 over 70 former professional footballers have graduated from Salford. In 2009 the PFA reported that they had 33 members undertaking the programme at the university.

- Nigel Adkins: former manager of Southampton
- Chris Banks: physiotherapist at Stoke City
- Charlie Barnett
- Matt Barrass
- Gregg Blundell: physiotherapist with Tranmere Rovers
- Jon Bowden
- Kieran Charnock
- Jeff Clarke
- Lee Collins
- Robert Duffy
- Joe Edwards
- Simon Farnworth
- Ashley Fickling
- Neil Foster: former England cricketer who played in 29 Tests and 48 ODIs from 1983 to 1993
- Ali Gibb
- Wayne Gill
- Jamie Green
- Rick Holden
- Phil Horner: physiotherapist with Blackpool F.C.
- Rob Hulse
- Stephen Jordan
- Mark Kilty
- Paul Lake: on the medical staff with Bolton Wanderers
- Henry McStay
- Steve Macauley
- Lee Martin: physiotherapist with Tranmere Rovers
- David Moore: physiotherapist with Grimsby Town
- Paul Morgan
- Jamie Murphy: former Chief Physiotherapist with Manchester City
- Keith Oakes
- Joe O'Neill
- Alex O'Reilly
- Jason Oswell
- Les Parry: former manager of Tranmere Rovers
- Richie Partridge
- Mel Pejic: physiotherapist at Bolton Wanderers
- Jamie Pipe: former Derbyshire professional cricketer
- Jamie Pitman: Hereford United physiotherapist
- Mick Rathbone: former Head of Sports Medicine at Everton
- Nicky Reid: completed two degrees in Sports Rehabilitation and Physiotherapy
- Phil Robinson
- Ian Rodgerson: physiotherapist for Hereford United
- Derek Ryan: Irish former international squash player
- Paul Scott
- Paul Showler
- Gary Stevens: former England international
- Rob Swire: chief physiotherapist at Manchester United
- Mark Taylor
- Paul Teather
- John Thompson
- Stuart Walker: physiotherapist at Aston Villa
- Steve Whitehall
- Jon Whitney: club physiotherapist at Walsall
- Ian Wilkinson
- Jon Worthington
- Rodger Wylde: physiotherapist for Stockport County

=== Politics ===
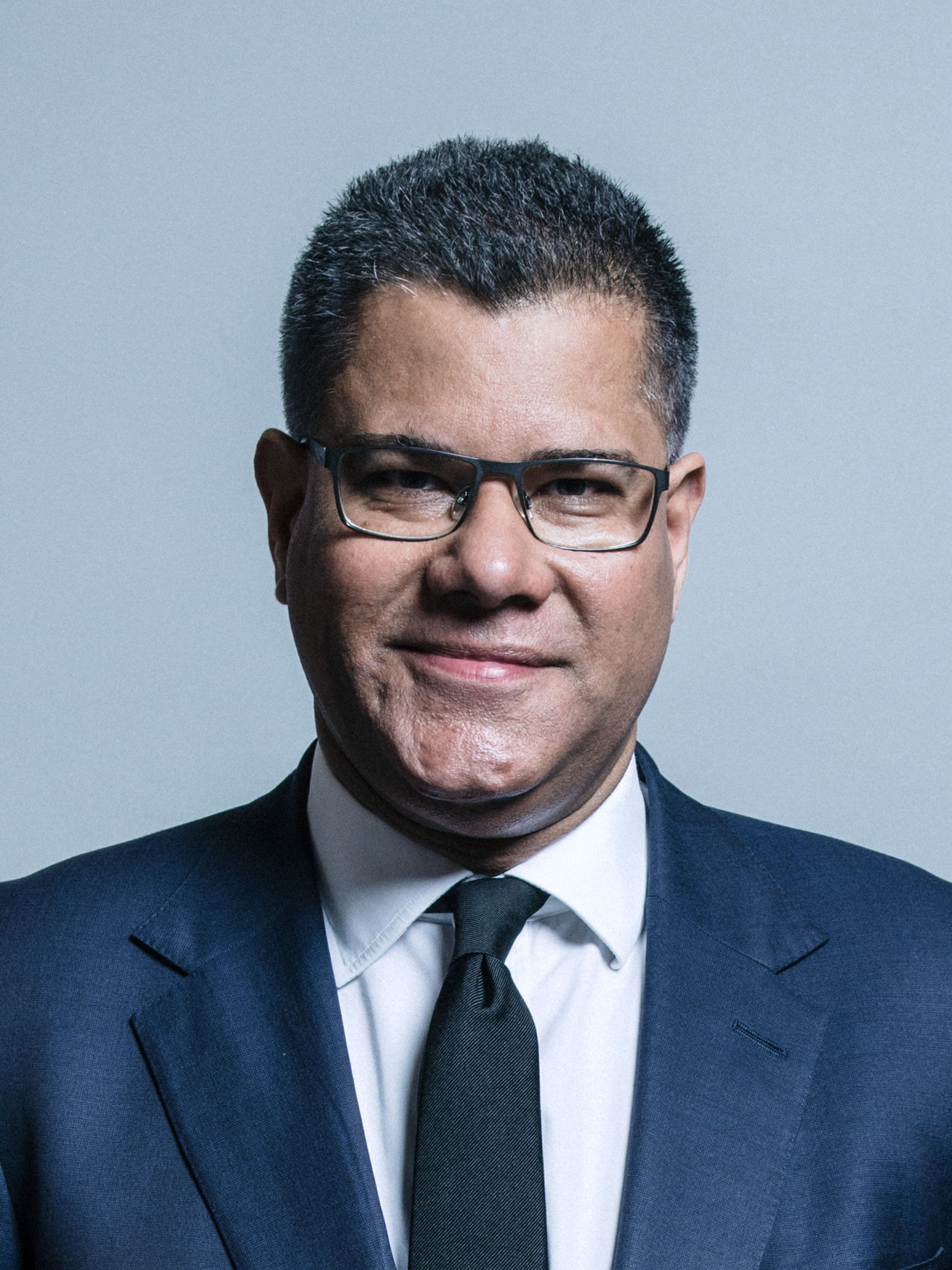
Alok Sharma

- Ruth Cadbury: Labour Member of Parliament for Brentford and Isleworth (UK Parliament constituency)
- John Pombe Magufuli: The Fifth President of The United Republic of Tanzania from 2015 to 2021 and former chairman of Chama Cha Mapinduzi party from 2016 to 2021
- Anwar Choudhury: British diplomat, former British High Commissioner to Bangladesh
- David Clark, Baron Clark of Windermere
- Stuart Drummond: three times elected mayor of Hartlepool
- Andrew Gwynne: Labour Member of Parliament for Gorton and Denton
- Trudy Harrison: Conservative Member of Parliament for Copeland
- Simon Haskel, Baron Haskel: Labour life peer and deputy speaker of the House of Lords
- George Howarth: Labour Member of Parliament for Knowsley North and Sefton East
- Abdul Wahab Juned: Bruneian Deputy Minister at the Prime Minister's Office
- Barbara Keeley: Labour Member of Parliament for Worsley and Eccles South
- Alok Sharma: British Conservative Party politician and Member of Parliament for Reading West
- Peter Smith, Baron Smith of Leigh: local Labour politician and life peer
- Richard Tice: Reform UK Member of Parliament for Boston and Skegness
- Ruth Turner: Labour political advisor; co-founder of The Big Issue in the North
- Andrew Snowdon, Police and Crime Commissioner for Lancashire
- Zamzam Ibrahim, President of the National Union of Students (United Kingdom)

=== Science ===
- Darwin Caldwell: Research Director, Italian Institute of Technology, key person in iCub project
- B. N. Suresh (Byrana Nagappa Suresh): Indian aerospace scientist; 2002 recipient of Padma Shri
- Dawn Edge, Professor of Mental Health and Inclusivity at the University of Manchester
- Nicolette Peel, British midwife and an advocate for women and families with cancer in pregnancy

=== Sports ===
- Eworitse Ezra Arenyeka: boxer
- Ieuan Evans: former international rugby union player for Wales
- David France: author and football historian
- Su Maozhen: assistant coach of the Chinese Olympic football team for Beijing Olympics, current head coach of U-20 national team
- Norman Whiteside: former Manchester United and Northern Ireland footballer who studied podiatry
