= Miklas =

Miklas is a given name and surname. Notable people with the name include:

- Miklas Scholz (born 1970), German civil engineer and water resources researcher
- Wilhelm Miklas (1872–1956), President of Austria
