= 1973 Tyne and Wear County Council election =

Election

12 April 1973	1977 →

All 104 seats on Tyne and Wear County Council 53 seats needed for a majority
	First party	Second party	Third party
Party	Labour	Conservative	Independent
Seats won	74	26	2
	Fourth party	Fifth party
Party	Liberal	Residents
Seats won	1	1
- Map of Tyne and Wear, UK, showing the results of the 1973 county council election by district.
Majority party after election
Labour

The 1973 Tyne and Wear County Council election was held on 12 April 1973 as part of the first elections to the new local authorities established by the Local Government Act 1972 in England and Wales. 104 councillors were elected from 95 electoral divisions across the region's five boroughs. Each division returned either one or two county councillors each by First-past-the-post voting for a four-year term of office. The election took place ahead of the elections to the area's metropolitan borough councils, which followed on 10 May 1973.

== Election results ==
The election resulted in a clear majority for the Labour Party, which won 74 of the 104 seats on the new Council.

The election resulted in the following composition of the County Council:

Party	Council
Labour	74
Conservatives	26
Independent	2
Liberal	1
Residents Association	1
Total	104
Working majority	44

== Results by district and electoral division ==
=== Gateshead ===
The Metropolitan Borough of Gateshead area was represented on the new Tyne and Wear County Council by 20 councillors from 15 electoral divisions. Five of the electoral divisions returned two councillors (Chester-le-Street, and Gateshead Nos. 1, 2, 3 and 4), the remainder returned one councillor. Labour took the majority of the seats in the Gateshead area: returning 17 councillors, compared to two for the Conservatives and one Residents Association councillor.

Blaydon (Central)

Blaydon (Central)
Party	Candidate	Votes	%	±%
Labour	J. Robson	2,755	94.6	
Communist	O. March	158	5.4	
Majority		2,597	89.2	
Turnout		2,913	33.7	
Registered electors		8,652		
Labour win (new seat)				

Blaydon (East)

Blaydon (East)
Party	Candidate	Votes	%	±%
Labour	M. Winder	elected unopposed		
Registered electors		5,415		
Labour win (new seat)				

Blaydon (West)

Blaydon (West)
Party	Candidate	Votes	%	±%
Labour	M. Williams	2,540	61.2	
Ind. Labour Party	F. Bilcliffe	1,610	38.8	
Majority		930	22.4	
Turnout		4,150	43.3	
Registered electors		9,603		
Labour win (new seat)				

Chester-le-Street

Chester-le-Street
Party	Candidate	Votes	%	±%
Labour	R. Dickinson	3,064	50.7	
Labour	R. Brown	2,726	45.1	
Independent	H. Mackay	1,497	24.8	
Liberal	E. King	1,479	24.5	
Liberal	R. Jennings	1,165	19.3	
Independent	J. Jobling	880	14.6	
Majority		1,567	25.9	
Turnout		6,040	48.6	
Registered electors		12,427		
Labour win (new seat)				
Labour win (new seat)				

Felling No. 1

Felling No. 1
Party	Candidate	Votes	%	±%
Residents	K. Buckingham	1,892	50.4	
Labour	J. Foster	1,627	43.4	
Independent	H. Freeman	234	6.2	
Majority		265	7.1	
Turnout		3,753	42.5	
Registered electors		7,831		
Residents win (new seat)				

Felling No. 2

Felling No. 2
Party	Candidate	Votes	%	±%
Labour	D. Hardy	1,940	50.8	
Residents	N. Buckingham	1,676	43.9	
Independent	L. Scholes	206	5.4	
Majority		264	6.9	
Turnout		3,822	40.1	
Registered electors		9,543		
Labour win (new seat)				

Felling No. 3

Felling No. 3
Party	Candidate	Votes	%	±%
Labour	T. Prudham	2,168	67	
Residents	A. Clayton	1,070	33	
Majority		1,098	33.9	
Turnout		3,238	32.8	
Registered electors		9,881		
Labour win (new seat)				

Gateshead No. 1

Gateshead No. 1
Party	Candidate	Votes	%	±%
Labour	F. Pattison	3,572	71.2	
Labour	J. McClure	3,567	71.1	
Conservative	M. Dickinson	1,445	28.8	
Conservative	I. Wallis	1,415	28.2	
Majority		2,127	42.4	
Turnout		5,015	28.7	
Registered electors		17,475		
Labour win (new seat)				
Labour win (new seat)				

Gateshead No. 2

Gateshead No. 2
Party	Candidate	Votes	%	±%
Labour	J. Crann	2,988	78.2	
Labour	H. Cowans	2,932	76.8	
Conservative	D. Hudson	833	21.8	
Conservative	J. Scott	777	20.4	
Majority		2,155	56.4	
Turnout		3,817	28.7	
Registered electors		13,298		
Labour win (new seat)				
Labour win (new seat)				

Gateshead No. 3

Gateshead No. 3
Party	Candidate	Votes	%	±%
Conservative	J. Nixon	3,847	46.3	
Conservative	G. Wilde	3,804	45.8	
Labour	T. Bennett	2,606	31.4	
Labour	J. McWilliams	2,481	29.9	
Liberal	J. Bennison	1,857	22.3	
Majority		1,241	14.9	
Turnout		8,303	44.1	
Registered electors		18,828		
Conservative win (new seat)				
Conservative win (new seat)				

Gateshead No. 4 (Wrekenton)

Gateshead No. 4 (Wrekenton)
Party	Candidate	Votes	%	±%
Labour	W. Collins	3,697	65.3	
Labour	J. Fitzpatrick	3,495	61.7	
Conservative	T. Eltringham	1,962	34.7	
Conservative	A. Ridley	1,910	33.7	
Majority		1,735	30.7	
Turnout		5,662	33.7	
Registered electors		16,813		
Labour win (new seat)				
Labour win (new seat)				

Ryton

Ryton
Party	Candidate	Votes	%	±%
Labour	J. Graham	elected unopposed		
Registered electors		11,480		
Labour win (new seat)				

Whickham No. 1 (Dunston)

Whickham No. 1 (Dunston)
Party	Candidate	Votes	%	±%
Labour	L. Atkins	elected unopposed		
Registered electors		8,342		
Labour win (new seat)				

Whickham No. 2

Whickham No. 2
Party	Candidate	Votes	%	±%
Labour	P. Snell	2,243	56.4	
Conservative	K. Leitch	1,732	43.6	
Majority		511	12.9	
Turnout		3,975	51.4	
Registered electors		7,740		
Labour win (new seat)				

Whickham No. 3

Whickham No. 3
Party	Candidate	Votes	%	±%
Labour	J. Briggs	1,878	67.6	
Conservative	M. Liddell	902	32.4	
Majority		976	35.1	
Turnout		2,780	47.2	
Registered electors		5,887		
Labour win (new seat)				

=== Newcastle upon Tyne ===
The Newcastle City Council area was represented on the County Council by 26 councillors from 26 electoral divisions. Labour won 16 seats, to the Conservatives' 9. One Independent councillor was elected, in the new Jesmond division.

Benwell

Benwell
Party	Candidate	Votes	%	±%
Labour	E. Hepple	1,632	88.6	
Conservative	R. Hurst	210	11.4	
Majority		1,422	77.2	
Turnout		1,842	27.9	
Registered electors		6,614		
Labour win (new seat)				

Blakelaw

Blakelaw
Party	Candidate	Votes	%	±%
Labour	E. Boland	2,725	77.6	
Conservative	B. Duncan	785	22.4	
Majority		1,940	55.3	
Turnout		3,510	31.3	
Registered electors		11,223		
Labour win (new seat)				

Castle Ward No. 1

Castle Ward No. 1
Party	Candidate	Votes	%	±%
Conservative	J. Petty	1,430	42.6	
Labour	E. Wade	1,215	36.2	
Liberal	W. Bloomfield	711	21.2	
Majority		215	6.4	
Turnout		3,356	56.7	
Registered electors		5,919		
Conservative win (new seat)				

Castle Ward No. 2

Castle Ward No. 2
Party	Candidate	Votes	%	±%
Labour	D. Armstrong	1,925	64.2	
Conservative	M. Hill	1,074	35.8	
Majority		851	28.4	
Turnout		2,999	38.1	
Registered electors		7,876		
Labour win (new seat)				

Dene

Dene
Party	Candidate	Votes	%	±%
Conservative	A. Grey	2,606	58.9	
Labour	A. Gourdie	1,821	41.1	
Majority		785	17.7	
Turnout		4,427	41.7	
Registered electors		10,619		
Conservative win (new seat)				

East City

East City
Party	Candidate	Votes	%	±%
Labour	R. Scott-Batey	1,194	81	
Conservative	V. Hazell	280	19	
Majority		914	62	
Turnout		1,474	32.9	
Registered electors		4,486		
Labour win (new seat)				

Elswick

Elswick
Party	Candidate	Votes	%	±%
Labour	A. Graham	1,155	39	
Liberal	D. Faulkner	1,153	39	
Conservative	C. Burdon-Taylor	652	22	
Majority		2	0.1	
Turnout		2,960	44.1	
Registered electors		6,713		
Labour win (new seat)				

Fawdon

Fawdon
Party	Candidate	Votes	%	±%
Labour	G. Castle	2,208	67.9	
Conservative	T. Wilkinson	1,044	32.1	
Majority		1,164	35.8	
Turnout		3,252	33.2	
Registered electors		9,781		
Labour win (new seat)				

Fenham

Fenham
Party	Candidate	Votes	%	±%
Conservative	D. Gilbert	2,209	64.7	
Labour	R. Armstrong	1,207	35.3	
Majority		1,002	29.3	
Turnout		3,416	36.5	
Registered electors		9,349		
Conservative win (new seat)				

Gosforth No. 1

Gosforth No. 1
Party	Candidate	Votes	%	±%
Conservative	M. Cummings	2,663	64.9	
Labour	E. Clasper	1,439	35.1	
Majority		1,224	29.8	
Turnout		4,102	37.8	
Registered electors		10,838		
Conservative win (new seat)				

Gosforth No. 2

Gosforth No. 2
Party	Candidate	Votes	%	±%
Conservative	N. Robson	2,405	55	
Labour	M. Goodfellow	1,964	45	
Majority		441	10.1	
Turnout		4,369	44.4	
Registered electors		9,830		
Conservative win (new seat)				

Heaton

Heaton
Party	Candidate	Votes	%	±%
Conservative	A. Dennison	2,192	60.9	
Labour	B. Rice	1,409	39.1	
Majority		783	21.7	
Turnout		3,601	38.7	
Registered electors		9,314		
Conservative win (new seat)				

Jesmond

Jesmond
Party	Candidate	Votes	%	±%
Independent	R. Booth	1,457	44	
Conservative	R. McVain	1,274	38.5	
Labour	W. Speck	578	17.5	
Majority		183	5.5	
Turnout		3,309	34.3	
Registered electors		9.009		
Independent win (new seat)				

Kenton

Kenton
Party	Candidate	Votes	%	±%
Conservative	J. Cox	2,055	50.5	
Labour	P. Furness	2,011	49.5	
Majority		44	1.0	
Turnout		4,066	51.1	
Registered electors		8,869		
Conservative win (new seat)				

Moorside

Moorside
Party	Candidate	Votes	%	±%
Labour	R. Collins	1,583	55.3	
Conservative	D. McKeag	1,282	44.7	
Majority		301	10.5	
Turnout		2,865	29.4	
Registered electors		9,730		
Labour win (new seat)				

Newburn No. 1

Newburn No. 1
Party	Candidate	Votes	%	±%
Labour	A. Gurd	2,013	59.9	
Conservative	T. Waters	1,347	40.1	
Majority		666	19.8	
Turnout		3,360	39.2	
Registered electors		8,568		
Labour win (new seat)				

Newburn No. 2

Newburn No. 2
Party	Candidate	Votes	%	±%
Labour	T. Marshall	4,064	78.3	
Conservative	J. Hill	1,126	21.7	
Majority		2,938	56.6	
Turnout		5,190	39.8	
Registered electors		13,056		
Labour win (new seat)				

Newburn No. 3

Newburn No. 3
Party	Candidate	Votes	%	±%
Labour	T. Robertson	1,786	55.2	
Conservative	I. Faith	1,450	44.8	
Majority		336	10.4	
Turnout		3,236	38.5	
Registered electors		8,403		
Labour win (new seat)				

Sandyford

Sandyford
Party	Candidate	Votes	%	±%
Conservative	B. Collins	1,902	58.1	
Labour	A. Hadwin	1,370	41.9	
Majority		532	16.3	
Turnout		3,272	45.3	
Registered electors		7,227		
Conservative win (new seat)				

Scotswood

Scotswood
Party	Candidate	Votes	%	±%
Labour	M. Mellor	1,742	61.5	
Conservative	J. Thomlinson	1,090	38.5	
Majority		652	23	
Turnout		2,832	35.5	
Registered electors		8,016		
Labour win (new seat)				

St Anthonys

St Anthonys
Party	Candidate	Votes	%	±%
Labour	I. McClean	2,012	88.9	
Conservative	M. Coote	250	11.1	
Majority		1,762	77.9	
Turnout		2,262	31.9	
Registered electors		7,089		
Labour win (new seat)				

St Lawrence

St Lawrence
Party	Candidate	Votes	%	±%
Labour	J. Deas	2,185	85.4	
Conservative	R. Lungley	373	14.6	
Majority		1,812	70.8	
Turnout		2,558	37.4	
Registered electors		6,837		
Labour win (new seat)				

Walker

Walker
Party	Candidate	Votes	%	±%
Labour	K. Sketheway	2,278	81.9	
Conservative	A. Telford	382	13.7	
Communist	N. Manchee	122	4.3	
Majority		1,896	68.2	
Turnout		2,782	27.9	
Registered electors		9.953		
Labour win (new seat)				

Walkergate

Walkergate
Party	Candidate	Votes	%	±%
Labour	C. Gray	2,312	59.8	
Conservative	L. Bulman	1,551	40.2	
Majority		761	19.7	
Turnout		3,863	39.2	
Registered electors		9,128		
Labour win (new seat)				

West City

West City
Party	Candidate	Votes	%	±%
Labour	S. Butcher	1,320	86.2	
Conservative	P. Heslop	211	13.8	
Majority		1,109	72.4	
Turnout		1,531	21.7	
Registered electors		7,048		
Labour win (new seat)				

Wingrove

Wingrove
Party	Candidate	Votes	%	±%
Conservative	N. Trotter	1,681	62.6	
Labour	J. Lamb	1,003	37.4	
Majority		678	25.3	
Turnout		2,684	33.4	
Registered electors		8,044		
Conservative win (new seat)				

=== North Tyneside ===
The Metropolitan Borough of North Tyneside area was represented on the new County Council by 18 councillors from 17 electoral divisions. One of the electoral divisions returned two councillors (Tynemouth No. 2), the remainder returned one councillor. Labour took the majority of the seats in the area: returning 12 councillors, with the Conservatives winning four, and the Liberals and an Independent each winning one.

Longbenton No. 1

Longbenton No. 1
Party	Candidate	Votes	%	±%
Labour	D. McCormack	2,298	78.2	
Conservative	W. Johnston	457	15.6	
Communist	J. Henderson	182	6.2	
Majority		1,841	62.7	
Turnout		2,937	30.4	
Registered electors		9,671		
Labour win (new seat)				

Longbenton No. 2

Longbenton No. 2
Party	Candidate	Votes	%	±%
Labour	J. Tait	2,021	52.8	
Conservative	A. Percy	1,810	47.2	
Majority		211	5.5	
Turnout		3,831	42.8	
Registered electors		8,958		
Labour win (new seat)				

Longbenton No. 3

Longbenton No. 3
Party	Candidate	Votes	%	±%
Labour	G. Addison	2,037	67.4	
Independent Socialist	J. Conway	517	17.1	
Conservative	S. Forster	470	15.5	
Majority		1,520	50.3	
Turnout		3,024	31.6	
Registered electors		9,557		
Labour win (new seat)				

Longbenton No. 4

Longbenton No. 4
Party	Candidate	Votes	%	±%
Labour	A. Hudson	2,454	69.8	
Conservative	B. McGillan	1,061	30.2	
Majority		1,393	39.6	
Turnout		3,515	37	
Registered electors		9,497		
Labour win (new seat)				

Seaton Valley (Backworth and Earsdon)

Seaton Valley (Backworth and Earsdon)
Party	Candidate	Votes	%	±%
Labour	J. May	2,197	78.9	
Conservative	B. McGillan	586	21.1	
Majority		1,611	57.9	
Turnout		2,783	44.9	
Registered electors		6,200		
Labour win (new seat)				

Tynemouth No. 1

Tynemouth No. 1
Party	Candidate	Votes	%	±%
Labour	E. Dolby	elected unopposed		
Registered electors		7,685		
Labour win (new seat)				

Tynemouth No. 2

Tynemouth no. 2
Party	Candidate	Votes	%	±%
Labour	J. Laws	2,863	74.5	
Labour	S. Reed	2,630	68.5	
Conservative	E. Ormston	978	25.5	
Conservative	E. Thompson	823	21.4	
Majority		1,885	49.1	
Turnout		3,841	25	
Registered electors		15,354		
Labour win (new seat)				
Labour win (new seat)				

Tynemouth No. 3

Tynemouth No. 3
Party	Candidate	Votes	%	±%
Independent	A. Chambers	1,383	31.4	
Liberal	H. Robertson	1,344	30.6	
Conservative	L. Goveas	1,051	23.9	
Labour	H. Sowerby	621	14.1	
Majority		39	0.9	
Turnout		4,399	49.7	
Registered electors		8,851		
Independent win (new seat)				

Tynemouth No. 4

Tynemouth No. 4
Party	Candidate	Votes	%	±%
Conservative	T. Duff	2,492	56.5	
Labour	P. Lee	1,054	23.9	
Liberal	F. Creese	868	19.7	
Majority		1,438	32.6	
Turnout		4,414	46.8	
Registered electors		9,542		
Conservative win (new seat)				

Tynemouth No. 5

Tynemouth No. 5
Party	Candidate	Votes	%	±%
Conservative	F. Mavin	1,698	63	
Labour	H. Rutherford	996	37	
Majority		702	26.1	
Turnout		2,694	36	
Registered electors		7,482		
Conservative win (new seat)				

Wallsend No. 1

Wallsend No. 1
Party	Candidate	Votes	%	±%
Labour	T. Conway	1,130	39.3	
Liberal	M. Hampton	1,049	36.5	
Independent Socialist	D. Taylor	698	24.3	
Majority		81	2.8	
Turnout		2,877	41.9	
Registered electors		6,859		
Labour win (new seat)				

Wallsend No. 2

Wallsend No. 2
Party	Candidate	Votes	%	±%
Liberal	P. Hampton	2,121	49.1	
Labour	O. Richardson	1,726	40	
Conservative	D. Bloxham	470	10.9	
Majority		395	9.1	
Turnout		4,317	45.3	
Registered electors		9,523		
Liberal win (new seat)				

Wallsend No. 3

Wallsend No. 3
Party	Candidate	Votes	%	±%
Labour	J. Hornsby	elected unopposed		
Registered electors		8,993		
Labour win (new seat)				

Wallsend No. 4

Wallsend No. 4
Party	Candidate	Votes	%	±%
Labour	J. Cousins	2,172	78.3	
Conservative	F. Rogers	603	21.7	
Majority		1,569	56.5	
Turnout		2,775	39.5	
Registered electors		7,021		
Labour win (new seat)				

Whitley Bay No. 1

Whitley Bay No. 1
Party	Candidate	Votes	%	±%
Labour	G. Nugent	2,088	51.5	
Conservative	R. Rawes	1,965	48.5	
Majority		123	3.0	
Turnout		4,053	49.7	
Registered electors		8,147		
Labour win (new seat)				

Whitley Bay No. 2

Whitley Bay No. 2
Party	Candidate	Votes	%	±%
Conservative	J. Baglee	1,684	47.3	
Labour	D. Horton	1,016	28.6	
Liberal	W. Rodgers	857	24.1	
Majority		668	18.8	
Turnout		3,557	32.6	
Registered electors		10,911		
Conservative win (new seat)				

Whitley Bay No. 3

Whitley Bay No. 3
Party	Candidate	Votes	%	±%
Conservative	D. Sanderson	1,456	35.2	
Liberal	R. Cairncross	1,427	34.5	
Labour	R. Oliver	1,254	30.3	
Majority		29	0.7	
Turnout		4,137	46.8	
Registered electors		8,837		
Conservative win (new seat)				

=== South Tyneside ===
The Metropolitan Borough of South Tyneside area was represented on the new Tyne and Wear County Council by 15 councillors from 12 electoral divisions. Three of the electoral divisions returned two councillors (South Shields Nos. 2, 3 and 4), the remainder returned one councillor. Labour took the majority of the seats in the area: returning 11 councillors, with the Conservatives taking four.

Boldon

Boldon
Party	Candidate	Votes	%	±%
Labour	R. McDarmont	3,036	62.7	
Conservative	J. Durham	1,806	37.3	
Majority		1,230	25.4	
Turnout		4,842	47.4	
Registered electors		10,209		
Labour win (new seat)				

Hebburn No. 1

Hebburn No. 1
Party	Candidate	Votes	%	±%
Labour	E. Shearan	elected unopposed		
Registered electors		10,160		
Labour win (new seat)				

Hebburn No. 2

Hebburn No. 2
Party	Candidate	Votes	%	±%
Labour	R. Fenwick	elected unopposed		
Registered electors		6,800		
Labour win (new seat)				

Jarrow No. 1

Jarrow No. 1
Party	Candidate	Votes	%	±%
Labour	M. Campbell	2,950	76.8	
Conservative	L. Abram	893	23.2	
Majority		2,057	53.5	
Turnout		2,057	38.4	
Registered electors		10,007		
Labour win (new seat)				

Jarrow No. 2

Jarrow No. 2
Party	Candidate	Votes	%	±%
Labour	B. Howard	2,233	59.9	
Conservative	O. Bolam	1,217	32.7	
Communist	R. Carr	277	7.4	
Majority		1,016	27.3	
Turnout		3,727	37.1	
Registered electors		10,044		
Labour win (new seat)				

South Shields No. 1

South Shields No. 1
Party	Candidate	Votes	%	±%
Conservative	P. Bugge	1,284	56.6	
Labour	E. Scrimger	984	43.4	
Majority		300	13.2	
Turnout		2,268	33.7	
Registered electors		6,728		
Conservative win (new seat)				

South Shields No. 2

South Shields No. 2
Party	Candidate	Votes	%	±%
Labour	H. Malcolm	2,942	77	
Labour	K. Scrimger	2,653	69.4	
Conservative	D. Rooze	877	23	
Majority		2,065	54.1	
Turnout		3,821	22.1	
Registered electors		17,293		
Labour win (new seat)				
Labour win (new seat)				

South Shields No. 3

South Shields no. 3
Party	Candidate	Votes	%	±%
Labour	P. Byers	2,532	52.6	
Labour	J. Richardson	2,514	52.2	
Conservative	G. Bairson	2,284	47.4	
Conservative	G. Auchterlonie	2,245	46.6	
Majority		248	5.1	
Turnout		4,818	29.2	
Registered electors		16,505		
Labour win (new seat)				
Labour win (new seat)				

South Shields No. 4

South Shields No. 4
Party	Candidate	Votes	%	±%
Conservative	R. Martinson	4,065	65.1	
Conservative	G. Smith	4,018	64.3	
Labour	K. Webster	2,181	34.9	
Labour	R. Barry	2,177	34.8	
Majority		1,884	30.2	
Turnout		6,249	38.1	
Registered electors		16,402		
Conservative win (new seat)				
Conservative win (new seat)				

South Shields No. 5

South Shields No. 5
Party	Candidate	Votes	%	±%
Labour	W. Malcolm	993	62.9	
Conservative	G. McGuire	585	37.1	
Majority		408	25.9	
Turnout		1,578	24.4	
Registered electors		6,464		
Labour win (new seat)				

South Shields No. 6

South Shields No. 6
Party	Candidate	Votes	%	±%
Labour	E. Mackley	2,217	77.1	
Conservative	D. Oates	658	22.9	
Majority		1,559	54.2	
Turnout		2,875	30.1	
Registered electors		9,538		
Labour win (new seat)				

Whitburn

Whitburn
Party	Candidate	Votes	%	±%
Conservative	T. Conway	2,133	51.6	
Labour	E. Pearce	1,997	48.4	
Majority		136	3.3	
Turnout		4,130	53.1	
Registered electors		7,775		
Conservative win (new seat)				

=== Sunderland ===
The Metropolitan Borough of Sunderland area was represented on the new Tyne and Wear County Council by 25 councillors from 25 electoral divisions. Labour took the majority of the seats in the Sunderland area, returning 18 councillors, ahead of seven for the Conservatives.

Bishopswearmouth

Bishopswearmouth
Party	Candidate	Votes	%	±%
Conservative	William Martin	1,179	45.3	
Labour	Peter Doidge	832	32	
Liberal	Michael Milburn	593	22.8	
Majority		347	13.3	
Turnout		2,605	34.9	
Registered electors		7,468		
Conservative win (new seat)				

Castletown and Hylton

Castletown and Hylton
Party	Candidate	Votes	%	±%
Labour	Leslie Watson	2,741	85.2	
Conservative	Peter Wood	328	10.2	
Communist	Richard Gibbs	147	4.6	
Majority		2,413	75	
Turnout		3,219	26.5	
Registered electors		12,154		
Labour win (new seat)				

Central

Central
Party	Candidate	Votes	%	±%
Labour	Michael Fitzsimmons	1,325	66.3	
Conservative	Joseph Tansey	391	19.6	
Liberal	James Thompson	283	14.2	
Majority		934	46.7	
Turnout		1,999	30.7	
Registered electors		6,519		
Labour win (new seat)				

Colliery

Colliery
Party	Candidate	Votes	%	±%
Labour	Frederick Ypey	1,205	56	
Conservative	James Wyness	948	44	
Majority		257	11.9	
Turnout		2,153	37.5	
Registered electors		5,748		
Labour win (new seat)				

Deptford and Pallion

Deptford and Pallion
Party	Candidate	Votes	%	±%
Labour	William Wilson	1,952	56.3	
Conservative	Walter Corry	1,515	43.7	
Majority		437	12.6	
Turnout		3,467	30.6	
Registered electors		11,336		
Labour win (new seat)				

Downhill

Downhill
Party	Candidate	Votes	%	±%
Labour	Derek Foster	1,816	85.7	
Conservative	John Brown	304	14.3	
Majority		1,512	71.3	
Turnout		2,120	26.1	
Registered electors		8,126		
Labour win (new seat)				

Ford and Pennywell

Ford and Pennywell
Party	Candidate	Votes	%	±%
Labour	Alan Waistell	2,346	79.5	
Conservative	John Marshall	604	20.5	
Majority		1,742	59.1	
Turnout		2,950	24.8	
Registered electors		11,888		
Labour win (new seat)				

Fulwell

Fulwell
Party	Candidate	Votes	%	±%
Conservative	Mordaunt Cohen	3,000	75.7	
Labour	Gordon Wainwright	965	24.3	
Majority		2,035	51.3	
Turnout		3,965	46.8	
Registered electors		8,465		
Conservative win (new seat)				

Hendon

Hendon
Party	Candidate	Votes	%	±%
Conservative	Phillip Soldinger	1,574	57.3	
Labour	Geoffrey Dodds	1,174	42.7	
Majority		400	14.6	
Turnout		2,748	39.4	
Registered electors		6,970		
Conservative win (new seat)				

Hetton No. 1

Hetton No. 1
Party	Candidate	Votes	%	±%
Labour	George Davidson	elected unopposed		
Registered electors		7,506		
Labour win (new seat)				

Hetton No. 2

Hetton No. 2
Party	Candidate	Votes	%	±%
Labour	Arthur Gray	elected unopposed		
Registered electors		5,040		
Labour win (new seat)				

Houghton-le-Spring No. 1

Houghton-le-Spring No. 1
Party	Candidate	Votes	%	±%
Labour	Edward Kelly	1,956	61	
Conservative	Alfred Wright	1,248	39	
Majority		708	22.1	
Turnout		3,204	42.2	
Registered electors		7,599		
Labour win (new seat)				

Houghton-le-Spring No. 2

Houghton-le-Spring No. 2
Party	Candidate	Votes	%	±%
Labour	Elizabeth Brown	2,283	74.5	
Conservative	Lorna Davidson	782	25.5	
Majority		1,501	49	
Turnout		3,065	40.3	
Registered electors		7,613		
Labour win (new seat)				

Houghton-le-Spring No. 3

Houghton-le-Spring No. 3
Party	Candidate	Votes	%	±%
Labour	John Avery	2,938	81.1	
Conservative	Mary Wright	685	18.9	
Majority		2,253	62.2	
Turnout		3,623	42.7	
Registered electors		8,480		
Labour win (new seat)				

Humbledon

Humbledon
Party	Candidate	Votes	%	±%
Labour	Robert Barnes	1,820	58	
Conservative	Mary Williams	1,317	42	
Majority		503	16	
Turnout		3,137	43.5	
Registered electors		7,210		
Labour win (new seat)				

Monkwearmouth and Roker

Monkwearmouth and Roker
Party	Candidate	Votes	%	±%
Conservative	William Thompson	3,006	62.9	
Labour	Joseph Redfearn	1,775	37.1	
Majority		4,781	25.7	
Turnout		1,831	41.1	
Registered electors		11,645		
Conservative win (new seat)				

Ryhope with Burdon

Ryhope with Burdon
Party	Candidate	Votes	%	±%
Labour	Joyce Copland	1,361	83.2	
Conservative	Leonard Bland	274	16.8	
Majority		1,087	66.5	
Turnout		1,635	25.3	
Registered electors		6,473		
Labour win (new seat)				

Silksworth

Silksworth
Party	Candidate	Votes	%	±%
Labour	William Brown	2,086	75.1	
Independent	Colin Orr	691	24.9	
Majority		1,395	50.2	
Turnout		2,777	33.8	
Registered electors		8,217		
Labour win (new seat)				

Southwick

Southwick
Party	Candidate	Votes	%	±%
Labour	Stanley Healie	1,184	82.8	
Conservative	Harold Verne-Jones	246	17.2	
Majority		938	65.6	
Turnout		1,430	24.6	
Registered electors		5,822		
Labour win (new seat)				

St Chad's

St Chad's
Party	Candidate	Votes	%	±%
Conservative	Richard Ditchburn	1,701	53.6	
Labour	George Affleck	1,470	46.4	
Majority		231	7.2	
Turnout		3,171	32.6	
Registered electors		9,727		
Conservative win (new seat)				

St Michael's

St Michael's
Party	Candidate	Votes	%	±%
Conservative	Joseph Landau	3,063	74.1	
Labour	Eric Holt	1,068	25.9	
Majority		1,995	48.3	
Turnout		4,131	45.6	
Registered electors		9,067		
Conservative win (new seat)				

Thorney Close

Thorney Close
Party	Candidate	Votes	%	±%
Labour	Alan Otterson	1,855	78.7	
Conservative	John Griggs	502	21.3	
Majority		1,353	57.4	
Turnout		2,357	25.4	
Registered electors		9,264		
Labour win (new seat)				

Thornhill

Thornhill
Party	Candidate	Votes	%	±%
Conservative	William Stephenson	2,016	78	
Labour	Richard Taylor	569	22	
Majority		1,447	56	
Turnout		2,585	39.4	
Registered electors		6,559		
Conservative win (new seat)				

Washington No. 1

Washington No. 1
Party	Candidate	Votes	%	±%
Labour	Charles McIlroy	2,081	82.4	
Conservative	George Brown	443	17.6	
Majority		1,638	64.9	
Turnout		2,524	29.4	
Registered electors		8,596		
Labour win (new seat)				

Washington No. 2

Washington No. 2
Party	Candidate	Votes	%	±%
Labour	Derek Sleightholme	1,925	61.8	
Independent	Kenneth Pyle	1,188	38.2	
Majority		737	23.7	
Turnout		3,113	25.6	
Registered electors		12,153		
Labour win (new seat)				
