= Rita Oyoku =

Nigerian philanthropist

Commissioner of Vanuatu to Nigeria
- Incumbent
- Assumed office February, 2023

Personal details
- Born: December 24, 1977 Delta, Nigeria
- Education: London School of Management Education; University of Salford
- Occupation: Philanthropist and humanitarian
- Website: https://www.ritaoyoku.com/

Rita Oyoku (24 December 1977) is a Nigerian philanthropist, and humanitarian. She serves as the Trade and Investment Commissioner of the Republic of Vanuatu to Nigeria, with a mandate to enhance trade and economic relations between the two countries since February 2023.

== Education ==
Rita Oyoku was born in Delta State, Nigeria. She completed her primary education Army Children School, Ikeja Cantonment in Lagos (1983–1989). She then attended Hopebay College in Lagos (1990–1995). She pursued higher education in Business Marketing at the London School of Management Education, UK, between 2009 and 2011.

== Career ==
In 2013, Oyoku established the Rita Oyoku Foundation, a non-profit organization focused on empowering communities through education, health, and social development initiatives in Nigeria and beyond. In 2016, she launched the Global Harmony Envoy International Initiative to address the root causes of irregular migration through economic empowerment, legal mobility pathways, and cross-border collaboration with governments and civil society. From 2021 to 2023, she served as special adviser on foreign trade to the mayor of Belmopan, Belize. In 2021, Rita was named among the members of the caretaker committees for the Darts Federation of Nigeria. Later that year, she was appointed President of the Federation.

In February 2022, Oyoku was appointed as the Trade Commissioner of the Republic of Vanuatu to Nigeria. She is responsible for strengthening bilateral relations, promoting trade and investment, and exploring broader strategic partnerships between Vanuatu and Nigeria.

In 2025, Rita Oyoku was appointed ambassador of The Jena Declaration, a global initiative based in Germany supporting the UN’s 17 Sustainable Development Goals. As CEO of the GHEII, Oyoku notably co-signed a six-point global action statement in April 2024 ahead of the United Nations Civil Society Conference held in Nairobi. The statement called for action on key global challenges including affordable education, food security, free movement across Africa, and more.
