= Andrew Diey =

British musician

Andrew William Langmanis Diey (/ˈdeɪ/; born 31 October 1973, Islington, London, England) is an English electronic musician, sound designer and record producer. As a solo artist, he is best known as Black Faction, or his previous moniker Foreign Terrain.

Diey first came to prominence as a musician on the Skam Records Manchester, offshoot label MASK 300, under his Foreign Terrain moniker, and later afterwards he moved onto using the more known Black Faction name for various labels. His career as a sound designer is also noteworthy: his works have appeared in many high-profile computer games and UK television broadcasts, and also on BBC radio.

Diey is the owner and senior creative director at Radium Audio. He has designed the interior sounds of a Bentley Continental GT car. Designed the audio for Ferrari California launch site, and has worked on many high-profile adverts and digital projects. Andrew Diey in 2011 announces his return to music with a new project Dalston Ponys a live production and dj set which is contains live interactive prototypes created by Radium Audio.

== History ==
Diey first became involved in electro acoustic music, at the age of 18. He attended the Electronic Music Studio in Stockholm, Sweden in 1993. He moved back from Sweden in 1995, to study for an HND in Music Technology at City College in Manchester, England. In 1997 he attended Salford University, on the Electro Acoustics BEng undergraduate course. In 1998 he attended IRCAM in Paris, as a sound designer, and working with IRCAM software.

== Professional work ==
His career within sound can be split into three periods. Game audio development, music for broadcast and sound for advertising

His works have been released on CDs for critical acclaim, he received a 5-album contract from his first demo tapes with Soleilmoon Portland, Oregon, he has created audio content for over 25 Game Development titles, produced hundreds of hours of broadcast music and sound including BAFTA nominated material. His most recent works have been for National Geographic HD Channel – Inside the Ultimate, producing the music and sound design using surround sound techniques.

Diey currently owns and operates Emmy Award Winning Radium Audio Ltd, in London. A music & sound design company.

BBC Sound Designer In 2006 Diey won the position of New Talent BBC Sound Designer competition, which was open to UK residents. Working in-house as a BBC sound designer.

- BBC New Talent Winner 2006 – Interview & Article
- BBC Sound Design Article – Advice for sound designers

2007 Diey has been working with D&AD, and also developing a series of productions for various interactive companies, brand agencies within sound branding, and sonification.

2007 Big Chip Award WINNER: Best Micro Business Big Chip Award. On 24 May Diey and his team at radium audio ltd won at The Big Chip awards.

Judged by a panel of experts from organisations such as New Media Age, the BBC, Trevor Beattie's new agency, and The Chase, the Big Chips are the top awards for ICT and new media outside London, attracting entries from the region's best over the last 9 years.

2007 Best of Manchester Music Award WINNER: Best of Manchester Music 2007 URBIS Best of Manchester Andrew Diey was presented with the Award by Manchester Graphic Designer Peter Saville, at URBIS Center in Manchester

2007 Roses Design Awards Nomination 2 Categories – Emerging Designer of 2007 & Best Animation [Sound & Music] Roses 2007 Nominations The prestigious design awards took place in Manchester on 18 October 2007

Creating bespoke audio in for manufactured products for Bentley Motors Plc, Sony, and Microsoft.

2008 Diey and Radium Audio Ltd are known for audio and global brands including Ferrari, Honda, Rolex, Universal, Ford, Nissan, Toyota, Philips, LG, Warner Brothers – Harry Potter brand see Radium Audio Ltd

- 2006: Bentley Motors Plc

Creation of in car Sound Design for Continental GT car range.

- 2007: Sonic Interaction Design: Nomination as a UK representative to the Management Committee of COST Action IC0601.

EU funded | European network, of 18 delegates from 14 countries to research and the exploitation of sound as one of the principal channels conveying information, meaning, and aesthetic/emotional qualities in interactive contexts. tags: Interaction Design, Auditory Display and Sonification, Sound and Music Computing, Sound Modeling, Sound Perception and Cognition.

- 2007: Diey is currently involved with a research project on product sound and its uses beyond interface and usability.

His work is directed towards, Brand and Differentiation for online commerce and experience.

=== Television ===
- Aug 2005: My Child Won't Stop Eating

ITV: 1 x 60 Min program of original music and sound design. Transmission: Granada / ITV

- Apr 2005: I Survived- Series 1

Granada / Discovery Channel / C5: 4 x 30 Min programs of original music and sound design. Transmission: Granada / Discovery Channel / C5

- Aug 2004: Dirtbusters

Granada / ITV: 8 x 30 Min programs of original music and sound design. Transmission: Granada / ITV

- Jun – Aug 2004: Building the Ultimate- Series 2

Granada / Discovery Channel / C5: 6 x 30 Min programs of original music and sound design. Transmission: Granada / Discovery Channel / C5

- 2003–2004: Tonight – With Trevor McDonald

Granada / ITV / ITN: Creation of Music / Original sound design / Several programs. Transmission: Granada / ITN

- Nov 2003: Russell Crowe's -"Greatest Fights"

Granada / Channel 4: 1 x 60 Min program of original sound design. Transmission: Granada / Channel 4 /

- Oct – Dec 2003: Building the Ultimate- Series 1

Granada / Discovery Channel / C5: 8 x 30 Min programs of original music and sound design. Transmission: Granada / Discovery Channel / C5

- Sep 2003: "Who Got Marc Bolan's Missing Millions?"

Granada / Channel 4: 1 x 60 Min program of original sound design. Transmission: Granada / Channel 4

- Aug – Sep 2003: "The History of British Sculpture [with Loyd Grossman]"

Polar Pictures / Channel 5: 6 x 30 Min programs of original music and sound design. Transmission: Channel 5

- Jul 2003: "Behind the Scenes [Hulk, Charlie’s Angels, Terminator 3]"

Endemol TV/ Channel 5: 3 x 60 Min program of original sound design. Transmission: Endemol / Channel 5

- Jul 2003: Risky Business

BBC / BBC Three: 3 × 1 hour programs of original music and sound design. Transmission: BBC Three

- May 2003: "Secrets of the Dark Ages [Barbarians]"

Granada Television / Channel 4: 3 × 1 hour programs of original music and sound design. Transmission: Channel 4

=== Commercials or adverts ===
- 2005: [Online & CD Media] Brother Corp Japan

DCP Inkjet products. 3 × 6 Mins Creation of Music / Original sound design / for several programs. Transmission: Online www.brother.com / March 2005 – Ongoing

- 2005: [Radio] Imperial War Museum

Smooth FM Network. 2 × 2 Mins sec original sound design. Transmission: Smooth FM / Sept 2004 – Jan 2005

- 2004: [Online & CD Media] Brother Corp Japan

Multifunction Inkjet products. 5 × 6 Mins Creation of Music / Original sound design / for several programs. Transmission: Online www.brother.com / Sept 2004 – Ongoing

- 2003: [Radio] Gleeson Homes

Jazz FM Network. 1 x 40 sec original sound design. Transmission: Jazz FM / Dec 2003

- 2003: [Television] Electrolux "Things are changing".

Various TV European Networks. 1 × 3 Min original music & sound design. Transmission: Various TV European Networks / Oct 2003

=== Radio ===
- 2006: In-House Sound Designer – BBC

Current position of sound design creating and sound treatment for radio drama

- 2003: Various SFX – Jazz FM

Additional Sound Effects / Sound Design Idents. Transmission: Jazz FM

- 2003: "The Tuner" by Kev Fegan

BBC Radio 4. 1 hour of original music and sound design. Transmission: BBC Radio 4 / Jan 2001

- 2003: "Fireface" by Marius von Mayenburg

BBC Radio 3's season of new drama, The Wire. Soundtrack and sound design. Transmission: BBC Radio 3 / Dec 2001

- 2003: TT [Isle of Man] Racing SFX

BBC Radio 4. Additional Sound Effects – Source material supplied by Alchemy Audio Lab. Transmission: BBC Radio 4

=== Computer games ===
==== Sound design ====
- 2002: Twin Caliber / Rage Software / Format Xbox / PlayStation 2
- 2002: Gun Metal / Rage Software / Format Xbox
- 2002: Automobili Lamborghini / Rage Software / Format Xbox / PlayStation 2
- 2002: Lucky & Wilde / Eutechnyx Software / Format Xbox / PlayStation 2 [Canned by publisher].
- 2003: Street Racing Syndicate / Eutechnyx Software / Format Xbox / PlayStation 2
- 2003: Juiced / Juice Games / Format Xbox / PlayStation 2 / PC
- 2004: Crash n Burn / Climax Group LTD / Format Xbox / PlayStation 2 / PC
- 2005: Test Drive Unlimited / Eden Games / Format Xbox / PlayStation 2 / PC
- 2005: LA Rush / Midway Games / Format Xbox / PlayStation 2 / PC
- 2005: Evolution GT / Milestone Games Italy / Format Xbox / PlayStation 2 / PC

==== FMV [In-Game Full Motion Video] ====
- 2003: Street Racing Syndicate / Eutechnyx Software / Format Xbox / PlayStation 2
- 2003: Thief III / Eidos Interactive / Format Xbox / PlayStation 2 / PC
- 2004: The Punisher / Full Sound Design Post Production 5.1 Surround Sound / THQ / Volition Software
- 2007: Resistance Fall of Man / Sound Design Post Production / Maverick media / Indigo Games / SCEE

=== Sound design and music for shorts ===
- 2004: Hells Corner

Yorkshire TV. 1 x 60 Min program of original Sound Design & Music. Transmission: ITV / TBA

- 2003: Domestic

BBC Two / Hurricane Films. 1 x 10 Min program of original Sound Design. Transmission: BBC Two / BBC Three / TBA. Credited as: Music by Alchemy Audio Lab

- 2003: Interloper

Feature Short by Interloper Films, directed by Robert Ford, Manchester. Credited as: Music by Alchemy Audio Lab

=== Other credits and appointments ===
- 2005: Manchester Metropolitan University & Jodrell Bank Radio Telescope [Cosmic Composer Project] in collaboration with NESTA [National Endowment for Science, Technology & Arts]. Creation sounds gathered from Space for use in schools with Interactive Whiteboards.
- 2005: Manchester Metropolitan University [Sound Design 2 Picture series II].
- 2006: Bentley Motors Plc

Creation of in car Sound Design for Continental GT car range.

- 2004: Reflex Communications [Clever Molecule project]

Original Music and Sound Design – Winner of "Best Digital Media Project" – Audio Visual Awards

- 2004: Manchester Metropolitan University [Sound Design 2 Picture series I]
- 2004: Co-Ordination – International Festival of Electronic Music and Audiovisual Arts

Working with Native Instruments, Propellerheads, TC Electronic, Korg, M-Audio, Ableton. Manchester, United Kingdom. [27 April to 8 May 2004]

- 2004: Showreel – [Quarterly Magazine for Film & TV professionals]

3 Page Article: An insiders guide to Sound Design for Games & Film. Showreel: Vol 1 :Issue: 03 [Jan 2004]

- 2004: Manchester Metropolitan University- [Sound Design | Sonic Arts Course].

Appointed Lecturer: Sound Design | Creative Audio | Sonic Art [Dec 2003].

- 2003: MacUser – [Bi- Monthly Magazine].

3 Page Audio: Workshops on MetaSynth – A Macintosh Audio Application. MacUser: Vol 19 :Issue: 24 [Nov 2003] – & MacUser CD Examples

- 2003: The Cornerhouse Manchester

Andrew Diey appointed Lecturer on Sound Design for films – teach discuss and build workshops on sound design.

- 2003: The Game Plan – EU

Andrew Diey appointed Lecturer on Sound Design for Computer Games, Part of the Game on Expo 2003. Europe wide.
