= Ad De Jongh =

Dentist and psychologist

Ad de Jongh is a Dutch professor in anxiety disorders, dentist and mental health psychologist (gz-psychology) who contributed to the fields of dental fear, anxiety, and trauma-related disorders.

== Education ==
Ad de Jongh completed his dental degree at the University of Amsterdam. After working as a dentist, he pursued further studies in clinical psychology and earned his master's degree cum laude from the University of Amsterdam. His Ph.D. was awarded based on his thesis entitled “Dental Anxiety: A Cognitive Perspective” which explored the cognitive aspects of dental phobia.

== Career ==
De Jongh began his career treating patients with dental fear, working at health centers. His dual expertise as a dentist and clinical psychologist led him to specialise in trauma-related anxiety disorders, particularly dental phobia, which is highly prevalent in the Netherlands. His research extended into post-traumatic stress disorder and psychotrauma, for which he became one of the senior trainers in Eye Movement Desensitization and Reprocessing (EMDR) therapy in Europe.

De Jongh was appointed professor of anxiety and behavior disorders at ACTA, where he oversees behavioral science research and has served as program director of a specialized master's program in dental fear treatment. He is also an honorary professor at the University of Salford (UK), University of Worcester (UK), and Queen's University Belfast (Northern Ireland).

De Jongh co-founded the Dutch EMDR Association and the EMDR Europe Association. His involvement in the Psychotrauma Expertise Centre (PSYTREC) is one of the largest treatment centres for PTSD worldwide. He is involved in many research projects that determine the efficacy of evidence-based treatments for the consequences of traumatic events in a wide variety of populations, including children, people with intellectual disabilities, and people with complex psychiatric conditions such as complex PTSD, psychotic disorders, and personality disorders. He has written or (co-) authored over 500 scientific publications in peer-reviewed journals or books.

== Publications ==
- Dental anxiety: A Cognitive Perspective (1995)
- Over 500 peer-reviewed articles in dental fear, trauma, and post-traumatic stress disorder research.
