= Kamaruddin Taib =

Kamaruddin bin Taib
- Born: 9 December 1957 (age 68)
- Education: University of Salford
- Occupation: Businessman
- Writing career
- Notable work: Chairman of HSBC Bank Malaysia
- Notable awards: Commander of the Order of Meritorious Service (PJN) - Datuk

Datuk Kamaruddin bin Taib (born 9 December 1957) is a Malaysian businessman who has been Non-Executive Chairman of HSBC Bank Malaysia since April 2022.

He is the son of Tan Sri Taib Andak. He holds a Bachelor of Science in mathematics from the University of Salford.

He was Executive Chairman of DNV Malaysia Sdn Bhd until June 2017. He is a former Chairman of Great Eastern Takaful, GHL Systems Bhd, Malaysia Pacific Corporation and HSBC Amanah Malaysia Bhd. He is currently a Director of Great Eastern General Insurance (Malaysia) Bhd, FIDE Forum, Fraser & Neave Holdings Bhd, Malaysia Smelting Corporation Bhd and RAM Holdings Bhd.

He was made a Commander of the Order of Meritorious Service (PJN) in 1997.

He was named in the Paradise Papers in 2017.

== Honours ==
- Malaysia
  - Commander of the Order of Meritorious Service (PJN) - Datuk (1997)
