= Allan Boardman =

British physicist (1937–2018)

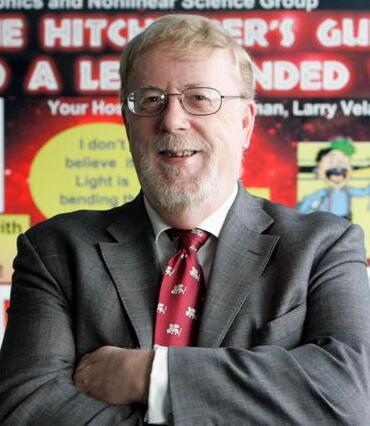
- Boardman in 2007
- Born: 1937; Northumberland, England
- Died: 24 November 2018 (aged 81)
- Education: Durham University
- Occupation: Physicist
- Children: 3

Allan Dawson Boardman (1937 – 24 November 2018) was a British physicist, known for his work on surface plasmons and guided wave optics, especially nonlinear waves, solitons, magneto-optics and negative refracting metamaterials. He was a theorist and numerical analyst in these areas, especially magneto-optics and metamaterials. In 2006 he was made a fellow of the Optical Society of America for his contributions in these fields and for "exemplary leadership and service to the optics community".

Boardman made substantial contributions to his university, leading the School of Sciences. Latterly, he was a Professorial Research Fellow at the University of Salford. He held a Doctor of Science degree from the University of Durham. He was a Fellow of the UK Institute of Physics and a Fellow of the UK Institute of Mathematics and its Applications. He was the conference chair for the major UK photonics meeting called Photon10. He was a Fellow of the SPIE and co-chair of the SPIE Photonic Metamaterials conference series to be held in San Diego in 2014. He had also organized other conferences, including being a director of a number of pivotal NATO Advanced Study Institutes.

He was the chair of the Optics and Photonics Division of the UK Institute of Physics and the vice-president of the United Kingdom Consortium for Optics and Photonics (UKCPO). He had served as a board member of the Quantum Electronics and Optics Division of the European Physical Society. He was the UK voice on the new European strategy program called OPERA [Optics and Photonics in the European Research Area] 2015.

Boardman was honoured with a special session in his name at the 3rd International Conference on Metamaterials, Photonic Crystals and Plasmonics (Meta '12) in Paris in 2012. He presented nearly 300 conference papers and had been editor for several books, such as 'Soliton-driven Photonics' https://www.amazon.com/Soliton-driven-Photonics-Nato-Science-II/dp/0792371313/ .

Boardman died on 24 November 2018, at the age of 81. He was survived by his three children and seven grandhcildren.

== Selected publications ==
- A. D. Boardman (editor and contributor on surface plasmons), "Electromagnetic Surface Modes", John Wiley (1982).
- Boardman, A. D.; Marinov, K. (11 April 2006). "Electromagnetic energy in a dispersive metamaterial". Physical Review B. 73 (16) 165110. arXiv:physics/0603199. Bibcode:2006PhRvB..73p5110B. doi:10.1103/physrevb.73.165110. ISSN 1098-0121. S2CID 17410032.
- Boardman, Allan D.; Marinov, Kiril (1 March 2006). "Nonradiating and radiating configurations driven by left-handed metamaterials". Journal of the Optical Society of America B. 23 (3). The Optical Society: 543–552. arXiv:physics/0511113. Bibcode:2006JOSAB..23..543B. doi:10.1364/josab.23.000543. ISSN 0740-3224. S2CID 25334045.
- Boardman, Allan; King, Neil; Rapoport, Yuriy; Velasco, Larry (12 September 2005). "Gyrotropic impact upon negatively refracting surfaces". New Journal of Physics. 7. IOP Publishing: 191. arXiv:cond-mat/0603466. doi:10.1088/1367-2630/7/1/191. ISSN 1367-2630.
- Boardman, A. D.; King, N.; Velasco, L. (2005). "Negative Refraction in Perspective". Electromagnetics. 25 (5). Informa UK Limited: 365–389. arXiv:cond-mat/0508501. Bibcode:2005cond.mat..8501B. doi:10.1080/02726340590957371. ISSN 0272-6343. S2CID 119514654.
- Boardman, A D; Egan, P; Velasco, L; King, N (21 January 2005). "Control of planar nonlinear guided waves and spatial solitons with a left-handed medium". Journal of Optics A: Pure and Applied Optics. 7 (2). IOP Publishing: S57–S67. arXiv:cond-mat/0603159. Bibcode:2005JOptA...7S..57B. doi:10.1088/1464-4258/7/2/008. ISSN 1464-4258. S2CID 119361492.
