= Mary Mellor =

English academic and activist (born 1946)

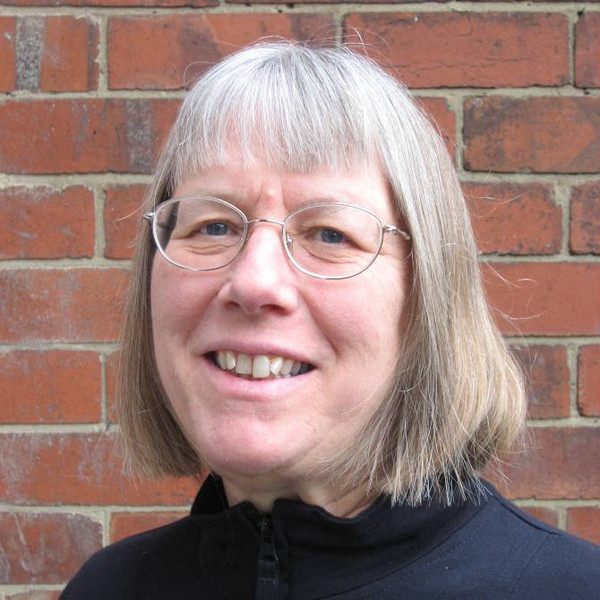
- Born: 1946 (age 79–80); Cornwall, England
- Awards: Bernardo Aguilar Award (United States Society for Ecological Economics)

Academic background
- Education: Salford University; Newcastle University

Academic work
- Institutions: Northumbria University

Mary Mellor (born 1946) is a British academic and activist, who is Emeritus Professor in Social Science at Northumbria University, where she was the founding chair of the Sustainable Cities Research Institute. She has published widely on ecofeminism, sustainability and economics. In 2017 she was awarded the Bernardo Aguilar Award from the United States Society for Ecological Economics.

== Career ==
Born in Cornwall in 1946, Mellor graduated from Salford University in 1971. She went on to be awarded a PhD from Newcastle University and worked at Newcastle Polytechnic (renamed Northumbria University in 1992) as a lecturer from 1974. In 1973 she served as a Councillor (Tyne and Wear Metropolitan Council). In 1988 Mellor was one of a group of four women who took the Department of Applied Social Sciences at Newcastle Polytechnic to an employment tribunal. The group claimed that they were discriminated against for promotion due to their gender. From 2000 to 2002 she chaired the board of Financial Inclusion Newcastle Ltd.

As of 2024, Mellor is Emeritus Professor in Social Science at Northumbria University, where she was the founding chair of the Sustainable Cities Research Institute. She has published widely on ecofeminism, sustainability and economics. An activist, as well as an academic, Mellor participated in the protest at Greenham Common peace camp. John Barry described her as "one of the main social theorists" in the field of gender and the environment. In 2017 she was awarded the Bernardo Aguilar Award from the United States Society for Ecological Economics.

== Works ==
Helena Feder described how Mellor's works grew "out of the same principle of radical politics that informs her theoretical work as an ecofeminist – challenge power where it lives". Mellor's 1997 book, Feminism and Ecology, aimed to counter dismissal of ecofeminism through analysis of the range of ecofeminist approaches, and to develop her own materialist position, useful for a "wide range of readers". It was described by Karen J. Warren as "an excellent overview of the many strands of thought contributing to the current body of ecofeminism". Adam S. Weinberg described it as a "good book" that "introduces an important literature and social movement to the sociological community". Tyler Veak reviewed the work as a comprehensive review of the field, but had hoped that it might provide a clearer "path for transformation" of the discipline. Mellor has sought to develop such a path in a series of papers and books that link gender inequality, social justice and ecological sustainability.

The 2008 financial crisis led to another series of books and papers that link gender equality, sufficiency provisioning and ecological sustainability with a critique of neoliberal money and finance. The Future of Money went further, arguing against the "privatisation of money" and discussing the possibilities that alternative approaches may give, such as an "ecofeminist political economy". Jeremy Leaman described the book as an "excellent book, elegantly and cogently written", which argued that money needed to be reclaimed from the profit-driven and repurposed for social inclusion. Mellor expanded this argument in Debt or Democracy, where she argued that private sector control of the creation of money through loans needs to be brought back into public control. 2019's Money: Myths, Truths and Alternatives examined the social value of money and its connections to neoliberalism. This work is written for a general readership and, according to sociologist David Blaazer, argues for monetary reform to reclaim the state's role in contrast to the power of private finance.

In addition to these works, Mellor has also published on worker's cooperatives and their histories, and toured Japan, Australia, the United States of America and the Netherlands after the publication of her 1992 work Breaking the Boundaries. Interviewed in the Green European Journal discussing the COVID-19 pandemic, Mellor described how issues for women had increased due to what she termed 'patriarchy in the home' and 'patriarchy of the wider economy'. Both focussed on the unfair expectations on women to shoulder caring responsibilities both privately and publicly.

== Awards ==
- 2017: Bernardo Aguilar Award (United States Society for Ecological Economics)

== Selected works ==
- Money: Myths, Truths and Alternatives (Policy Press, 2019)
- Debt or Democracy (Pluto Press, 2015)
- The Future of Money (Pluto Press, 2010)
- Hopwood, B., Mellor, M., and O'Brien, G., "Sustainable development: mapping different approaches." Sustainable Development 13.1 (2005): 38–52.
- Feminism and Ecology (Polity, 1997)
- Breaking the Boundaries (Virago, 1992)
