= Said Faiq =

Said Faiq is an established academic in the field of Translation, Cultural Studies and Intercultural Communication. He has worked in Africa, the Middle East and Europe practicing in translation and intercultural briefing for 16 years. Initially, Faiq worked in the United Kingdom at the University of Salford and the University of Leeds. At Salford, Faiq was the director of studies for Arabic/English translation & interpreting undergraduate and graduate programs from 1995 to 2001. He later moved to the American University of Sharjah (AUS) where he became the director of the Master of Arts in English/Arabic Translation and Interpreting program (2002-2007) and chair of the Department of Arabic Language and Literature (2003-2007). As of 2010, Faiq continues to teach Translation, Interpreting and Intercultural Studies at AUS and focus on his research in the field of Translatology.

== Publications ==
- 2007 Translated: Translation and Cultural Manipulation. Lanham & Oxford: UPA/Rowman & Littlefield
- 2006 (Ed). Identity and Representation in Intercultural Communication. San Antonio, TX: Trinity University.
- 2004 (Ed). Cultural Encounters in Arabic Translation. Clevedon (UK) & New York: Multilingual Matters.
- 2007 Thou Shall be translated this way: The master discourse of translation. In S. Kelly & D. Johnson (Eds.). Betwixt and Between: Place and cultural translation. Cambridge: Cambridge Scholars Press.
- 2006a. Cultural dislocation through translation. In Said Faiq (Ed.) Identity and Representation in Intercultural Communication (pp. 41–60). Trinity University: IAICS.
- 2006b. Medieval Arabic Translation: A Cultural Assessment. Invited article for a special issue of Mediaevalia, 26.2 (August)
- 2006c. Is this really translation: The Case of Arabic Literature in French. In Translation Watch Quarterly, Vol. 2: 4 (pp. 30–40).
- 2006d Textlinguistics. In K. Versteegh & M. Eid (eds). Encyclopedia of Arabic Language. Volume 1. Leiden: Brill.
- 2005 Cultural dislocation through translation. In Said Faiq (Ed.) Identity and Representation in Intercultural Communication. Special issue of Intercultural Communication Studies, Vol. XIII: 4, pp. 41–60). Trinity University: IAICS. (this article also appears as a chapter in a book, see 2006a above)
- 2004a The Cultural Encounter in Translating from Arabic. In Said Faiq (Ed.) Cultural Encounters in Arabic Translation (pp. 1–13). Clevedon (UK) & New York: Multilingual Matters.
- 2004b The Discourse of Intercultural Translation. In R. N. St. Clair, M. F. Medina, L. Zeng & A. C. Thomé-Williams (Eds) The Social Dimensions of Communicating Across Cultures. Intercultural Communication Studies, XIII: 3, pp. 61–72.
- 2003 Your culture, my language: Representation and the Master Discourse of

Translation. In Interaction Entre Culture et Traduction. Tangier: L'Ecole Supérieure Roi Fahd de Traduction.

== See also ==
- Language Interpretation
- Translation
- Intercultural Communication
- American University of Sharjah
