= Michael Atchia =

Mauritian academic

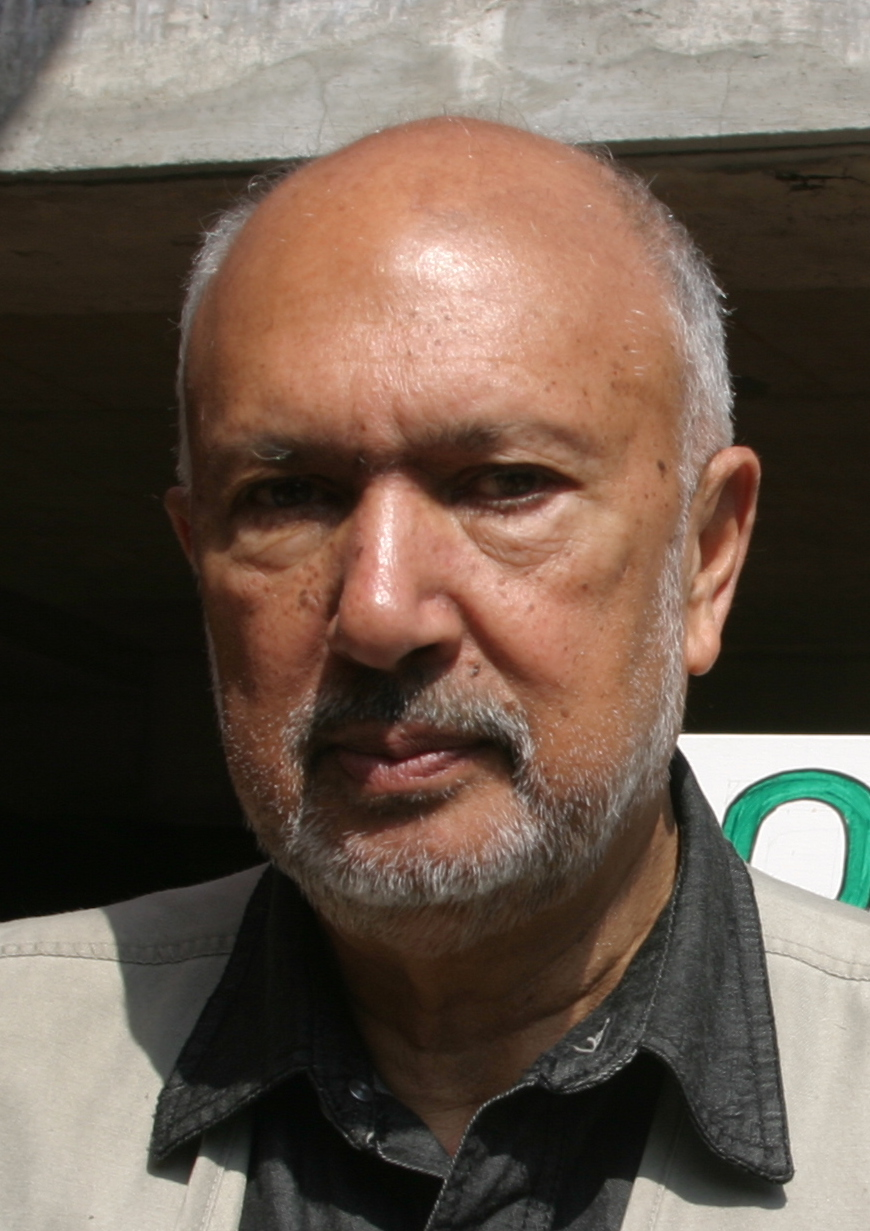
- Dr. Michael Atchia at the Fourth International Conference on Environmental Education
- Born: 14 November 1938 (age 87); Mauritius
- Occupations: UN-retiree, former Chief and Programme Director with the United Nations Environment Programme; presently Secretary- General and Founder member of AFICS-M (Association of Former International Civil Servants from Mauritius). Elected as an international Vice-President of FAFICS (2012, 2013 2014), the 22,000 strong Federation of former United Nations staff
- Spouse: Paula Atchia (author of the novel Mansfield Letters—the sequel to Jane Austen's Mansfield Park)
- Children: Konrad (1965), Julian (1967) and Stefan (1972)
- Website: www.michael-atchia.info

Notes
- Author of 100 newspaper articles for the newspaper L'Express (of Mauritius), appearing under the title "LIVE'N'LEARN". Articles may be accessed from the website of lexpress.mu opening archives and searching Michael Atchia.

Michael Atchia is a Mauritian academic. He is the former chief and programme director with the United Nations Environment Programme. He is a pioneering specialist in the field of sustainable development and has worked internationally in educational reform, international and regional environmental project management and conflict resolution, environmental education and curriculum development. As international consultant he has undertaken numerous consultancies in more than 50 countries and has worked with organizations such as UNESCO, World Health Organization, UNDP, ILO, GTZ/DSE of Germany and the British Council.

== Awards ==
In 1990 he received the "Tree of Learning Award" of the IUCN for 20 years significant contribution to conservation education and in 1996 the "Environmental Leadership Award" from the East African Environment Network. In 2012 he received an honorary Doctor of Science (D.Sc.) from the University of Salford, Salford, UK, in recognition for "his outstanding contributions to science".
