= London School of Management Education =

English for-profit school

London School of Management Education (informally LSME) is a for-profit private Higher Education in the United Kingdom. LSME was founded in 2007 by Dr Ravi Kumar and Dr Sarita Parhi. It is currently listed as a Higher Education Provider (HEP). The School offers diplomas, undergraduate and postgraduate courses in Business Management, Education, Health and Social Care, Accounting and Finance, and Hospitality and Tourism. To support the UK government's effort to bridge the widening gap of educationally and economically deprived children and young people and also young people with special needs and those in the category of Not in Education, Employment, or Training (NEET), LSME has an ambitious Access and Participation Plan, which is approved by the Office for Students (OfS). LSME has students from various nationalities enrolled across its diploma, undergraduate and postgraduate programmes. External institutions award all degrees.

== History ==
The London School of Management Education was established as an academic learning centre for the less privileged to take up Higher Education. The Founders, Dr Ravi Kumar (executive director) and Dr Sarita Parhi (Principal), set up the college at the Knowledge Dock of the University of East London, University Way, Royal Docks, London. It officially started in 2007 with the delivery of teacher training courses for the UK and EU learners. In 2009, LSME began delivering Diploma in Teaching in the Lifelong Learning Sector (DTLLS) programme for government funding and gradually introduced the Health and Social Care and Business Management qualifications in 2010. LSME further introduced Higher National Diploma and BSc in Health and Social Care and Business qualifications in addition to the Diploma in Education and Training (DET) programme. Further programmes; BSc International Tourism and Hospitality Management, Master of Education and MSc Business Management were added to the portfolio of programmes delivered. LSME's early years saw rapid growth, with the institution successfully delivering programmes to both local and international students within its first three years of operation. The school's physical presence evolved alongside its academic offerings:

- 2009 - LSME moved to 48 Bishopsgate and subsequently to a rented property at Curtain Road, London.
- 2013 - To accommodate growth, the school began holding some classes in an additional rented property on Monteagale Court, Wakering Road, Barking. This year it also marked a shift in focus towards local UK and EU students due to changes in UKBA policies affecting international student recruitment.
- 2017 - LSME officially opened its new premises in Gants Hill (Cambrian House on Cranbrook Road) in a ribbon-cutting ceremony held on the 20th of April 2017. The event was attended by The Lord Northbrook, Cllr Gurdial Bhamra, the Mayor of the London Borough of Redbridge, Mr Mike Gapes, the (then) MP for Ilford South, Hassan Shifau, the Deputy Ambassador for the Republic of Maldives in the UK.
- 2017 - LSME became a Signatory to the United Nations Principles for Responsible Management Education (PRME).
- 2019 - LSME became a registered Higher Education Provider under the Office for Students Approved (Fee cap) category.
- 2020 - The School applied and received extra funding from the HSBC bank UK as part of its £14bn lending fund to support management education schools in the UK.
- 2022 - LSME acquired an additional campus on Cranbrook Road, Gants Hill. Essex

Throughout its development, LSME continued to broaden its academic offerings, introducing degrees in International Tourism and Hospitality Management, Education, and Business Management. LSME organises a series of annual International Research Conferences focused on Responsible Research and Innovations (RRI). These conferences have also produced reports such as the Report on the Proceedings of the International Conference on Responsible Research in Education and Management and its Impact. To nurture the culture of responsible research and innovations, the school had signed a memorandum of understanding (MoU) with the Panjab University in recognition of the establishment of a new collaborative working arrangement for responsible research in India. The school is affiliated to the United Nations Principles of Responsible Management Education (PRME) whose principles are focused on engaging businesses and management schools to ensure future leaders are provided with the skills needed to achieve the Sustainable Development Goals (SDGs). In recent years, LSME has received recognition for its work in education, winning numerous awards from the Barking and Dagenham Chamber of Commerce.

== Academics and Research ==
=== Academic Programmes ===
As of 2024, LSME offers a range of undergraduate and postgraduate programmes in various fields. These include:

Bachelor of Science (BSc) degrees in:

  - International Tourism and Hospitality Management
  - Health and Social Care Management
  - Business Management
  - Accounting and Finance

Master's level programmes:

  - Master of Education (MEd)
  - Master of Science (MSc) in Business Management
  - Master of Business Administration (MBA)

The school also introduced integrated master's qualifications in Health and Social Care and Business Management. The institution offers accelerated BSc programmes in International Tourism and Hospitality and Health and Social Care. All degree-level programmes offered at LSME are validated and awarded by the University of Chichester, while Higher National Diploma (HND) level programmes are awarded by Pearson Education.

=== Research Activities ===
LSME has developed a significant research agenda since 2015, focusing on Responsible Research and Innovations (RRI). Key research activities include:

- Annual International Research Conferences: Organized since 2015, these conferences are held alternately in London and India, centering on the theme of Responsible Research and Innovations (RRI).
- International Collaborations: In 2017, LSME signed a Memorandum of Understanding with Panjab University, India, to conduct collaborative RRI programmes. The institution has since expanded its partnerships to include M.C.M. D.A.V College for Women, Chandigarh.

== QAA Reviews ==
The LSME (and its associated division) underwent its first and most successful Review of Educational Oversight in 2014 by the UK's Quality Assurance Agency for Higher Education (QAA) and has continued to have annual monitoring visits as well as full higher education review. LSME's last monitoring by the QAA was published in February 2019 and concluded that:

- The maintenance of the academic standards of awards offered on behalf of external degree-awarding bodies and other awarding organisations met UK expectations.
- The School has a clear understanding of how the admissions process is supporting access for students of different backgrounds and the School takes active steps to target under-represented groups.
- In the last year, the School has continued to develop partnerships with universities to further research and enable students to make research proposals.
- The good practice in the context of individualised learning and the development of research activity continues to benefit both staff and students.
- While the School has made considerable progress with the recommendation concerning trends in complaints and appeals, there was insufficient evidence within Academic Board minutes to demonstrate a strategic response to analyses of complaints received.

== Campuses and Locations ==
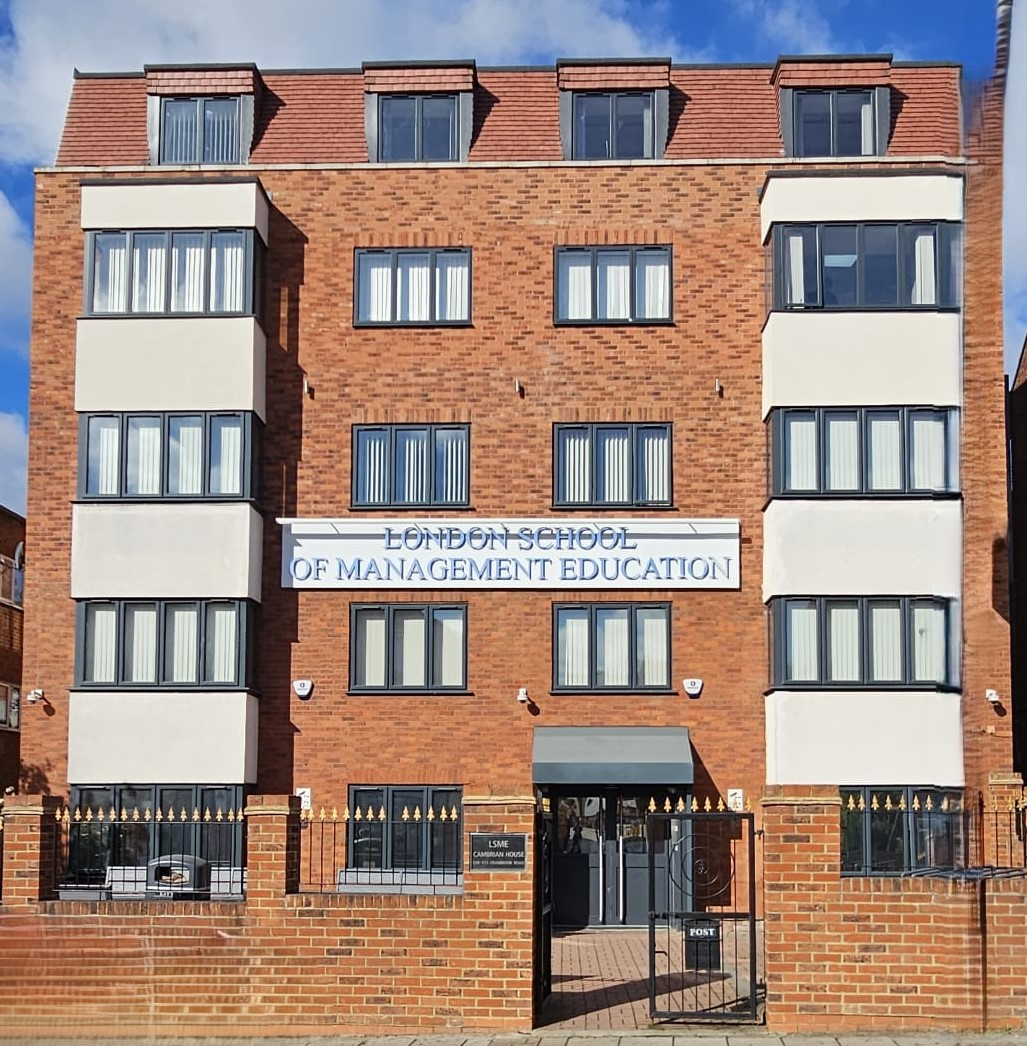
LSME main campus

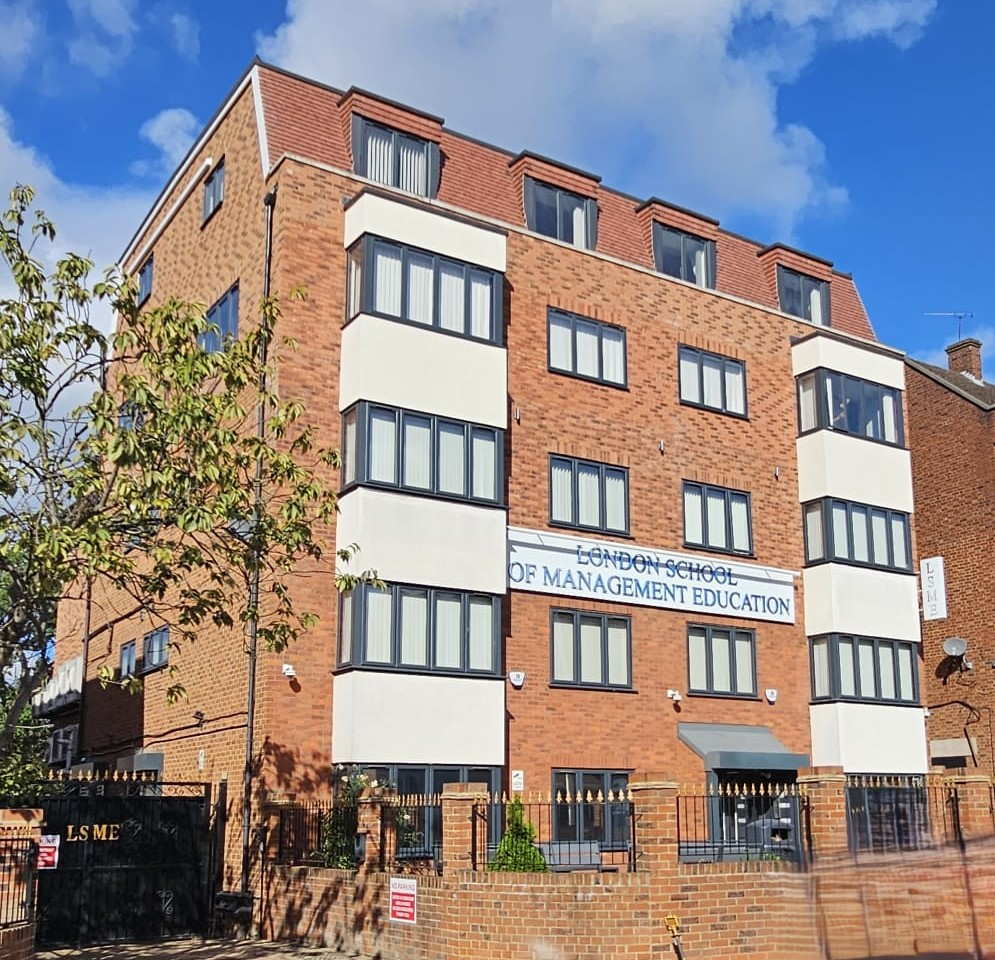
Side view of the LSME campus

LSME's campuses are located in the bustling area of Gants Hill in Ilford, London Borough of Redbridge, close to many amenities for students. The nearest London Underground Station is Gants Hill Station on Central Line, which is a minute walk from the second site of LSME and a 2-minute walk from the main site. Ilford Station on TfL Rail is just about 10 minutes by local bus service.

== Organization and Administration ==
The Governance structure of LSME is quite simple and flat. The Board of Directors (BoD) oversee all the operations of LSME. The Senior Management Committee (SMC) directly reports to and takes advice from the BoD while ensuring all matters of daily operations of the provision. The Staff Committee and the Internal Quality Review/Audits Committee report to the BoD through the SMC. The Academic Board (AB) is in charge of the overall governance of all academic matters and informs BoD of the progress and developments. The Access and Participation Committee, the Student Experience Committee, the Academic Quality and Standards Committee and the Programme Boards report directly to the AB. All the academic departments report to the Programme Board. The Student Welfare & Pastoral Care Committee, Complaints Handling Committee and Attendance & Disciplinary Committee are subcommittees of the Student Experience Committee.

=== International Partnerships ===
LSME has established several international partnerships to support student mobility and research collaboration:

- Dev Samaj College of Education, Chandigarh, India
- Islamic University of Maldives

These partnerships aim to facilitate joint academic programmes and research collaborations, enhancing the institution's global reach and impact in higher education.
