= HSBC Bank Malaysia =

Malaysian subsidiary of HSBC

HSBC Bank Malaysia Berhad
- Native name: 馬來西亞滙豐銀行; Má-lâi-se-a Hoâi-hong Gûn-hâng (Hokkien POJ); Maa5 Loi4 Sai1 Aa3 Wui6 Fung1 Ngan4 Hong4 (Cantonese Jyutping)
- Formerly: Hongkong Bank Malaysia Berhad
- Company type: Berhad (public limited company)
- Industry: Retail and Commercial Bank
- Founded: 1884; 142 years ago in No.1 Downing Street, George Town, Penang
- Headquarters: Menara IQ, Tun Razak Exchange, Kuala Lumpur, Malaysia
- Number of locations: More than 60 branches
- Area served: Worldwide
- Key people: Kamaruddin Taib (Non-Executive chairman); Mukhtar Hussain (Director); Chen Kar Leng (Director); Lee Choo Hock (Director); Choo Yee Kwan (Director); Stuart Milne (CEO)
- Products: Personal Financial Services, Commercial Banking, Global Banking & Markets and Islamic financial solutions.
- Brands: HSBCnet, HSBC Advance, HSBC Premier
- Operating income: ▲RM 2.73 billion (2018)
- Net income: ▲RM 1.03 billion (2018)
- Total assets: ▼RM 65.7 billion (2018)
- Number of employees: > 4,000
- Parent: The Hongkong and Shanghai Banking Corporation Limited
- Subsidiaries: HSBC Amanah Malaysia Berhad
- Rating: AAA
- Website: www.hsbc.com.my

HSBC Bank Malaysia Berhad (until 1999: Hongkong Bank Malaysia Berhad) is a bank headquartered in Kuala Lumpur, Malaysia. It was founded on 1 October 1984, and is a wholly owned subsidiary of HSBC. The Group serves about 39 million customers worldwide from offices in 66 countries and territories in Europe, the Asia-Pacific region, the Americas, the Middle East and Africa. Locally, HSBC Bank Malaysia Berhad serves customers with a network of over 60 branches nationwide, where about a third are the branches of its Islamic Banking subsidiary, HSBC Amanah Malaysia Berhad.

HSBC Bank Malaysia is the largest foreign-owned bank in Malaysia by asset, offers a full range of personal and commercial banking services from its network of branches and direct channels. In addition, HSBC has been offering Islamic financial services in Malaysia since August 2006 through its Islamic banking subsidiary HSBC Amanah Malaysia Berhad in Malaysia.

== History ==
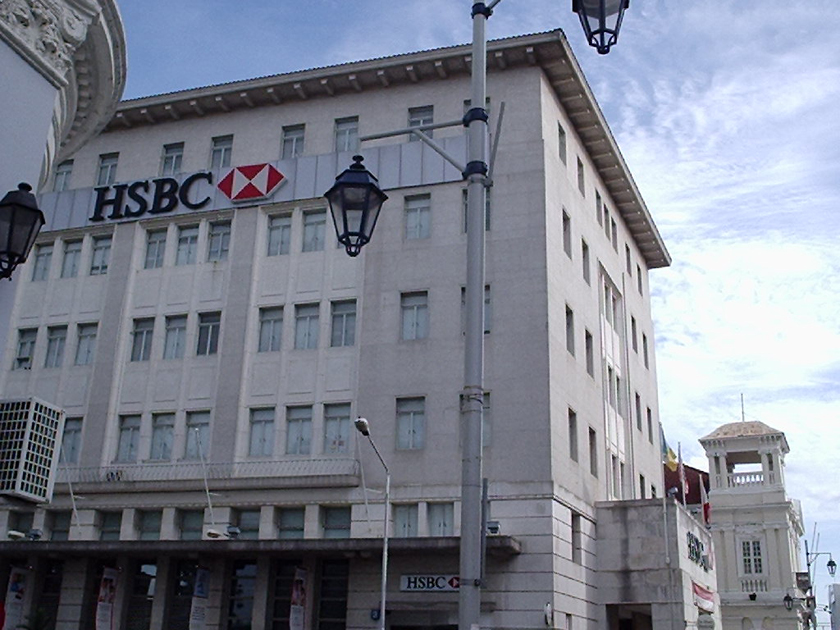
In 1884, the first HSBC branch in Malaysia was established in Penang to serve merchants in the region.

In 1884, after the establishment of The Hongkong and Shanghai Banking Corporation Limited offices in Shanghai and Hong Kong, the bank established its third office in Penang, one of the Strait Settlements in present-day Malaysia, with permission to issue currency notes. The bank later opened its office in Malacca in 1909 and by the end of 1912, offices had opened in Ipoh, Kuala Lumpur, Johor Bahru and Kota Bharu. During the 1920s and 1930s, the bank opened more branches in several states, Sungai Petani branch in 1922, Kuantan in 1929, Muar in 1930, and Kuala Terengganu in 1936.

In East Malaysia, the first branch opened in Kota Kinabalu in 1947. Branches were set up in Sandakan and Tawau a year later, followed by Labuan in 1957. Meanwhile, in Sarawak, branches opened in Kuching in 1958 and 1964 and in Sibu in 1959.

By 1959, The Hongkong and Shanghai Banking Corporation Limited had embarked on a programme of acquisitions – including The Mercantile Bank and alliances and has network of 40 branches throughout Malaysia. Through the acquisition of The Mercantile Bank, which started operations in Malaysia in 1860, HSBC is indirectly the oldest bank in Malaysia.

Currently HSBC Bank Malaysia Berhad has a network of 40 branches nationwide.

== Local incorporation ==
Hongkong Bank Malaysia Berhad was incorporated on 1 October 1984. On 1 January 1994, the Malaysian branch operations of The Hongkong and Shanghai Banking Corporation were localised and transferred to Hongkong Bank Malaysia. The Hongkong and Shanghai Banking Corporation sold its Malaysian banking business to the intermediate holding company of the HSBC Group that time, but the bank still has the offshore banking unit in Labuan. Later, in conjunction with the HSBC Group's global rebranding exercise, the legal name HSBC Bank Malaysia Berhad was adopted on 23 February 1999. The bank become the subsidiary of The Hongkong and Shanghai Banking Corporation on 1 January 2009, due to the reorganization of the HSBC Group.

== See also ==
- HSBC (Hong Kong)
