= Stuart Walker (footballer) =

English footballer and physiotherapist

Personal information
- Full name: Stuart Walker
- Date of birth: 9 January 1951 (age 75)
- Place of birth: Garforth, England
- Position: Goalkeeper

Team information
- Current team: Aston Villa (physiotherapist)

Youth career
- Leeds United

Senior career*
Years	Team	Apps	(Gls)
- Tadcaster Albion
1975–197?	York City	2	(0)
- Marine
- * Club domestic league appearances and goals

Stuart Walker (born 9 January 1951) is an English former professional football goalkeeper and is currently a physiotherapist at Aston Villa.

Walker began his football career as an apprentice with Leeds United, but joined York City in August 1975 from non-league Tadcaster Albion, making his debut in the 1976–77 season. He played just two league games for York before injury ended his professional career and he returned to non-league football with Marine.

Walker initially worked in Rugby league with Leeds and was Castleford's physio when they played on the 1985 Challenge Cup Final at Wembley. He then returned to football and became physio at Sunderland. In July 1998 he was awarded a degree in physiotherapy from the University of Salford while working as the physio at Chester City.

He became physio at Aston Villa under manager John Gregory and after a spell as Shrewsbury Town physio also worked under Gregory with Derby County. He left Derby under a cloud after being suspended along with Gregory and assistant manager Ross McLaren in March 2003.

He subsequently returned to Aston Villa as physio and following the departure of manager David O'Leary Walker was temporarily one of Villa's first team coaches under caretaker manager Roy Aitken.
