= Nicolette Peel =

British midwife, MBE

Nicolette Peel MBE
- Born: Nicolette Jennifer Kemp Moore; 29 March 1972; Newton Abbot, Devon, England
- Died: 31 January 2023 (aged 50); Tameside, Greater Manchester, England
- Education: University of Salford
- Occupations: Midwife, Cancer Advocate
- Known for: Mummy’s Star, nonprofit organization

Nicolette Peel MBE (1972–2023) was a British midwife and an advocate for women and families with cancer in pregnancy and postpartum period. In 2007, Peel was first diagnosed with breast cancer. After treatment, she was eventually cancer-free. However, in 2012, Peel was diagnosed with cancer again, soon after the birth of one of her children. From this experience, she co-founded a charity called Mummy’s Star (2013) in memory of a friend, Mair Wallroth. It is the only charity in the UK and Ireland dedicated to women and their families diagnosed with cancer during pregnancy or within 12 months of giving birth.

Working with Mummy's Star inspired Peel to change her career. Leaving her job as a primary school teacher, she trained as a midwife so she could work in the National Health Service. She attended the University of Salford, graduating in 2016. Whilst at university, she won the Best Academic Achievement in Nursing & Midwifery for her cohort. Peel was also the chairwoman of the Midwifery Society at Salford University, part of a steering committee for pregnant asylum seekers, and was dedicated to supporting and empowering women during pregnancy and childbirth

In June 2018, Peel became only the third person in the United Kingdom to receive a chief midwifery gold award, which is given to midwives who go above and beyond their job roles in the NHS. She also received the Kate Granger Award for compassionate care.

In late 2019, Peel was awarded the MBE for her work with Mummy’s Star and other charitable work.

In January 2023, Nicolette Peel died of cancer, aged 50.
