= Miklas Scholz =

Civil engineer and water resources researcher

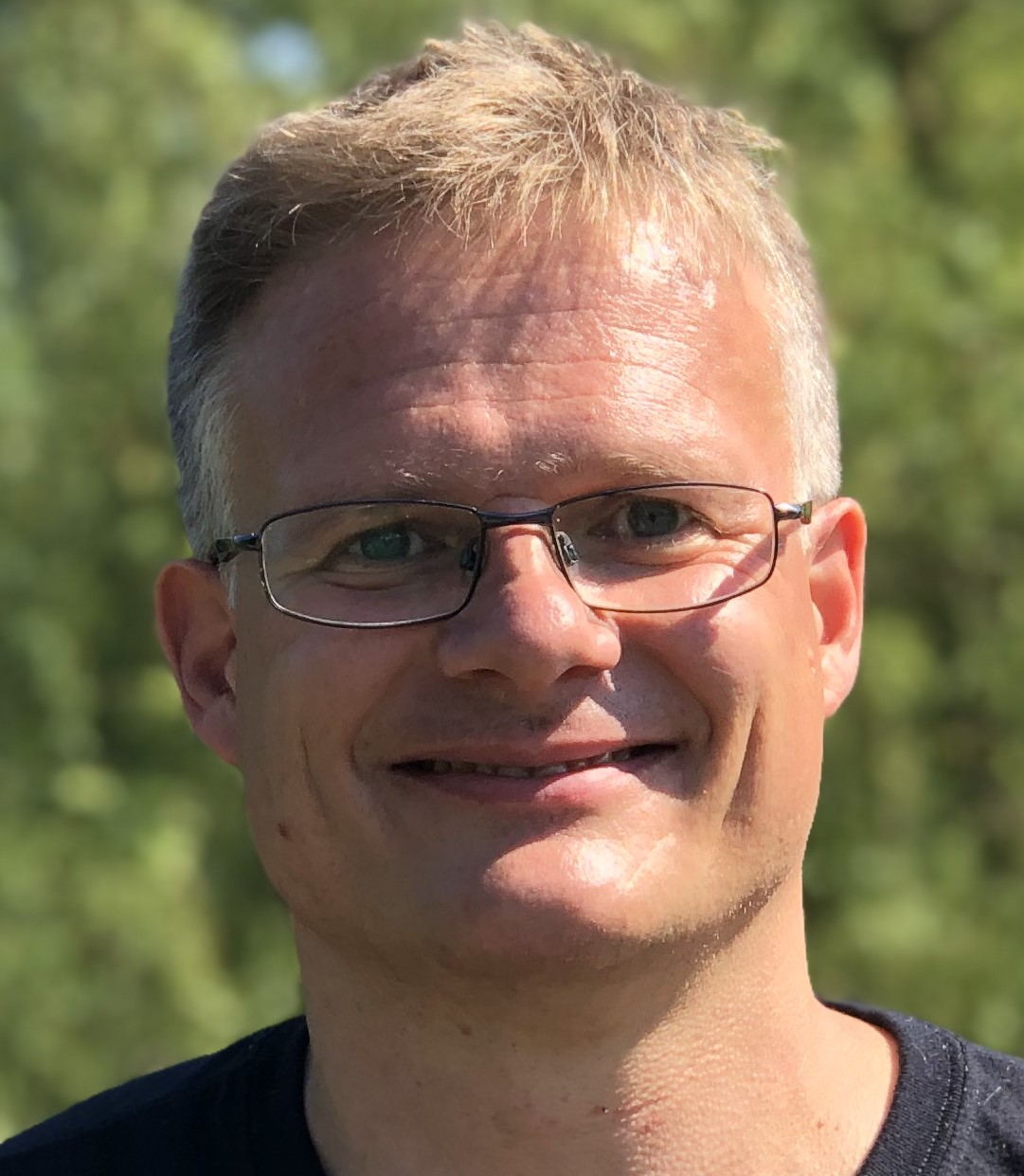
- Born: 16 September 1970 (age 56)
- Occupations: Professor, editor and researcher

Academic background
- Education: MSc in Water Resources Engineering; PhD in Civil Engineering; PgC in Higher Education Practice; DSc in Civil Engineering
- Alma mater: Lund University

Academic work
- Institutions: Lund University; University of Salford; University of Johannesburg; Central University of Technology

Miklas Scholz is the Head of the Department of Water Management at the District of Herzogtum Lauenburg, Germany. He is a Technical Specialist for Nexus by Sweden and a Hydraulic Engineer at Kunststoff-Technik Adams, Germany. Scholz is also a distinguished professor at Johannesburg University.

Scholz's main research areas are treatment wetlands, integrated constructed wetlands (ICW), sustainable flood retention basins (SFRB), permeable pavement systems, decision support systems, ponds and capillary suction time. He has published 10 books and 349 journal articles in 138 different journals. He has also served as an editor of several scientific journals. Since 2020, his work has been cited over 11346 times according to Google Scholar, with an h-index of 66.

In 2019, Scholz was awarded €7,000,000 for the EU H2020 REA project Water Retention and Nutrient Recycling in Soils and Streams for Improved Agricultural Production (WATERAGRI). He received €1,520,000 in 2018 for the JPI Water Project 2018.

== Education ==
Scholz completed his M.Sc. in water resources engineering from City, University of London in 1995. He did his doctoral studies in civil engineering from the University of Birmingham in 1997. He then completed his PgC in higher education practice from the University of Bradford in 2002. Scholz obtained a DSc in civil engineering from the University of Salford in 2017.

== Career ==
=== Academic career ===
Scholz started his academic career as a lecturer at the University of Bradford. He worked at the University of Edinburgh between 2002 and 2010. He left the University of Edinburgh and joined University of Salford as a full professor. There he was appointed as chair in civil engineering and later as the director of the Civil Engineering Research Centre (CERC). From 2016 till 2019, he served as a guest professor at the University of Electronic Science and Technology of China. He is a distinguished professor of civil engineering at the Central University of Technology and of civil engineering science at the University of Johannesburg. He is the Head of the Department of Water Management at the District of Herzogtum Lauenburg, Germany. He is also a Technical Specialist for Nexus by Sweden and a Hydraulic Engineer at Kunststoff-Technik Adams, Germany.

DProf. Scholz was/is an Editor, Sub-editor and Editorial Board member (no double counting) of 37, 11 and 121 journals, respectively. He is the editor of Exploratory Environmental Science Research and Journal of Environmental and Life Sciences.

=== Research ===
Scholz's research is mostly focused on treatment wetlands, integrated constructed wetlands (ICW), sustainable flood retention basins (SFRB), permeable pavement systems, decision support systems, ponds and capillary suction time. He has also conducted research about non-conventional water resources to address the increased demand in clean fresh water.

Scholz's SFRB concept assesses the multi-functionality of all large water bodies with particular reference to their flood and diffuse pollution control potential. The SFRB concept addresses the need to assess the flood control potential of all European water bodies as part of new legislation. He has presented an unbiased classification system, which allows all stakeholders to clearly define the purpose of a water body that can be classed as an SFRB.

Scholz contributed to the design guidelines of wetland systems as a research consultant. These guidelines assist managers in all aspects of ICW planning, design, construction, maintenance and management. His research has led to the incorporation of findings into national and international guidelines on wetland and sustainable drainage systems.

Scholz has conducted research about non-conventional water resources to address the increased demand in clean fresh water. Wastewater is considered an alternative option to overcome the shortage in water supply resulting particularly from population growth. He has identified the application of treated wastewater for agricultural irrigation as having much potential, especially when incorporating the reuse of nutrients like nitrogen and phosphorus, which are essential for plant production.

Among the current treatment technologies applied in urban wastewater reuse for irrigation, Scholz found wetlands to be one of the most suitable in terms of pollutant removal and have advantages due to both low maintenance costs and required energy. His research highlighted that specific wastewater characteristics decide upon the wetland design to be used for treatment. Wetland behavior and efficiency concerning wastewater treatment is mainly linked to macrophyte composition, substrate, hydrology, surface loading rate, influent feeding mode, microorganism availability and temperature. Scholz's research indicated that constructed wetlands are effective in removing organics and suspended solids, although the removal of nitrogen is relatively low, but could be improved by using a combination of various types of constructed wetlands.

== Bibliography ==
=== Books ===
- Wetland Systems to Control Urban Runoff (2006)
- Wetland Systems: Storm Water Management Control (2010)
- Permeable Pavements And Storm Water Management (2014)
- Sustainable Drainage Systems (2015)
- Water Resources And Environment (2015)
- Wetlands For Water Pollution Control (2015)
- Sustainable Water Treatment: Engineering Solutions for a Variable Climate (2018)
- Dam Failure Assessment For Sustainable Flood Retention Basins (2022)
- Sustainable Water Treatment (2024)

=== Selected articles ===
- Carty A., Scholz M., Heal K., Gouriveau F. and Mustafa A. (2008), The Universal Design, Operation and Maintenance Guidelines for Farm Constructed Wetlands (FCW) in Temperate Climates. Bioresource Technology, 99 (15), 6780–6792.
- Kayranli B., Scholz M., Mustafa A. and Hedmark Å. (2010), Carbon Storage and Fluxes Within Freshwater Wetlands: a Critical Review. Wetlands, 30 (1), 111–124.
- Lee B.-H. and Scholz M. (2006), Application of the Self-organizing Map (SOM) to assess the Heavy Metal Removal Performance in Experimental Constructed Wetlands. Water Research, 40 (18), 3367–3374.
- Lee B.-H. and Scholz M. (2007), What is the Role of Phragmites australis in Experimental Constructed Wetland Filters Treating Urban Runoff? Ecological Engineering, 29 (1), 87–95.
- Meyer D., Chazarenc F., Claveau-Mallet D., Dittmer U., Forquet N., Molle P., Morvannou A., Pálfy T., Petitjean A., Rizzo A., Samsó Campà R., Scholz M., Soric A. and Langergraber G. (2015), Modelling Constructed Wetlands: Scopes and Aims – A Comparative Review. Ecological Engineering, 80, 205-213.
- Scholz M. (2005), Review of Recent Trends in Capillary Suction Time (CST) Dewaterability Testing Research. Industrial & Engineering Chemistry Research, 44 (22), 8157-8163
- Scholz M. and Grabowiecki P. (2007), Review of Permeable Pavement Systems. Building and Environment, 42 (11), 3830-3836.
- Scholz M. and Xu J. (2002), Performance Comparison of Experimental Constructed Wetlands with Different Filter Media and Macrophytes Treating Industrial Wastewater Contaminated with Lead and Copper. Bioresource Technology, 83 (2), 71–79.
- Scholz M., Harrington R., Carroll P. and Mustafa A. (2007), The Integrated Constructed Wetlands (ICW) Concept. Wetlands, 27 (2), 337-354.
- Tang X., Huang S., Scholz M. and Li J. (2009) Nutrient Removal in Pilot-scale Constructed Wetlands Treating Eutrophic River Water: Assessment of Plants, Intermittent Artificial Aeration and Polyhedron Hollow Polypropylene Balls. Water, Air and Soil Pollution, 197 (1-4), 61-73.
- Tang X., Li Q., Wu M., Lin L. and Scholz M. (2016), Review of Remediation Practices Regarding Cadmium-enriched Farmland Soil with Particular Reference to China. Journal of Environmental Management. 181, 646-662.
- Tota-Maharaj K. and Scholz M. (2010), Efficiency of Permeable Pavement Systems for the Removal of Urban Runoff Pollutants under Varying Environmental Conditions. Environmental Progress & Sustainable Energy, 29 (3), 358–369.
- Yaseen D. A. and Scholz M. (2019), Textile Dye Wastewater Characteristics and Constituents of Synthetic Effluents: a Critical Review. International Journal of Environmental Science and Technology. 16(2), 1193–1226.
