= Schroder Asian Total Return Investment Company =

British investment trust

- Type: Public company
- Traded as: LSE: ATR; FTSE 250 constituent
- Industry: Investment
- Founded: 1987; 39 years ago
- Headquarters: London, United Kingdom
- Products: Investment fund
- Website: www.schroders.com/en-gb/uk/individual/funds-and-strategies/investment-trusts/schroder-asian-total-return-investment-company-plc/

Schroder Asian Total Return Investment Company (LSE: ATR), is a large British investment trust focused on investments in equities in the Asia Pacific region. The company is listed on the London Stock Exchange and is a constituent of the FTSE 250 Index.

The company's stated investment objective is to seek to provide a high rate of total return through investment in equities and equity related securities of companies trading in the Asia Pacific region (excluding Japan). The company seeks to offer a degree of capital preservation through tactical use of derivative instruments.

== History ==
The company was established as the TR Pacific Investment Trust under the management of Touche Remnant in October 1987. It was brought under the management of Henderson Group after Henderson bought Touche Remnant in 1992. The company became the Henderson TR Pacific Investment Trust in October 1997 and, with Andy Beal of Henderson serving as manager from 2005, it was renamed the Henderson Asian Growth Trust in March 2012. After Schroders took over the mandate from Henderson in January 2013, it become the Asian Total Return Investment Company in March 2013, before adopting its current name in September 2016.

In June 2026, Schroder Asian Total Return Investment Company plc and Pacific Assets Trust plc agreed to a merger, creating a combined £1.1 billion Asia-Pacific investment trust. The company is managed by Robin Parbrook and King Fuei Lee of Schroders, and Sarah MacAulay continues as chair following the merger. The deal, managed by Schroders, provides PAC shareholders with options for share rollover or a partial cash exit.

== Performance and ratings ==
In 2024, FE fundinfo awarded portfolio manager Robin Parbrook the Alpha Manager of the Year award in recognition of strong performance throughout his career.

The company won the Asia Pacific category as part of Investment Week's Investment Company of the Year Awards in November 2025.

In February 2026 the company was recognised in the Association of Investment Companies list of 2026 ISA Millionaires, which records investment trusts that would have earned shareholders over one million pounds if they had invested their full ISA allowance and reinvested dividends from 1999 to 2025.
