= Aberforth Split Level Income Trust =

British investment trust

Aberforth Split Level Income Trust plc
- Type: Public
- Traded as: LSE: ASIT
- Industry: Investment trust Split capital investment trust
- Founded: 2017; 9 years ago
- Website: Official Webpage

Aberforth Split Level Income Trust plc, formerly Aberforth Geared Income Trust, is a British investment trust managed by Aberforth Partners, focused on income and capital growth for shareholders.

The fund operates as a split capital investment trust featuring two classes of shares available on the London Stock Exchange, Ordinary Shares and Zero Dividend Preference (ZDP) shares.

Aberforth Partners LLP manages the fund with Angus Gordon Lennox serving as the chairman since its inception in July 2017. Notably, Lennox also holds the position of chairman for the Mercantile Investment Trust, managed by JPMorgan Chase.

In June 2024, shareholders approved a special resolution to place Aberforth Split Level Income Trust plc into members’ voluntary liquidation, with the assets transferred to Aberforth Geared Value & Income Trust plc under a scheme of arrangement.

== See also ==
- Aberforth Smaller Companies Trust
