= TR Property Investment Trust =

British investment trust

- Company type: Public
- Traded as: LSE: TRY; FTSE 250 component
- Industry: Financial services
- Founded: 1905
- Headquarters: London, United Kingdom
- Key people: Kate Bolsover (Chair); Marcus Phayre-Mudge (Fund manager)
- Products: Investment management
- Website: www.trproperty.com

TR Property Investment Trust is a large British investment trust dedicated to investments in the property sector. Established in 1905, the company is a constituent of the FTSE 250 Index.

== History ==
The company was formed in 1905 as The Trust Union consolidating several smaller investment trust companies. After Touche Remnant secured the mandate, it was renamed TR Property Investment Trust PLC in April 1982. The company changed its investment policy to that of "investing predominately in securities in the property sector" at that time. It was brought under the management of Henderson Group after Henderson bought Touche Remnant in 1992. Henderson lost the mandate to Thames River Capital in April 2004. Thames River Capital LLP is part of Columbia Threadneedle Investments.
