= Henderson Smaller Companies Investment Trust =

British investment trust

- Traded as: LSE: HSL; FTSE 250 component
- Industry: Investment trust
- Founded: 1887
- Headquarters: London, United Kingdom
- Key people: Penny Freer (chair); Indriatti van Hien (manager)
- Website: Official website

Henderson Smaller Companies Investment Trust is a large British investment trust dedicated to investments in smaller companies. It is listed on the London Stock Exchange and is a constituent of the FTSE 250 Index.

== History ==
The company was established as The Trustees Corporation in 1887. After Touche Remnant secured the mandate, it was renamed TR Trustees Corporation in April 1982 and became the TR Smaller Companies Investment Trust in October 1990. It was brought under the management of Henderson Group after Henderson bought Touche Remnant in 1992. It adopted its current name in September 1997. The company is managed by Indriatti van Hien of Janus Henderson and the chair is Penny Freer.
