= City of London Investment Trust =

British investment trust

- Traded as: LSE: CTY; FTSE 250 component
- Industry: Investment trust
- Founded: 1861
- Headquarters: London, UK
- Key people: Sir Laurie Magnus (Chairman); Job Curtis (Lead Fund Manager)
- Website: Official site

City of London Investment Trust is a large British investment trust dedicated to investments in UK equities. Established in 1861, the company is a constituent of the FTSE 250 Index; it is also listed on the New Zealand Stock Exchange. The chairman is Sir Laurie Magnus, and the manager since 1991 has been Job Curtis. He is supported by deputy fund manager David Smith. The fund is managed by Janus Henderson.

== History ==
The company was formed as City of London Brewery Company Limited in 1860 to acquire Calverts, a family brewing business at Upper Thames Street in the City of London. In 1932, the name was changed to The City of London Brewery and Investment Trust Limited, parts of the business having been sold and the proceeds invested in securities according to investment trust principles. In 1968, the remaining part of the brewery business was sold and the Company concentrated exclusively on investments in securities.

In 1970, the Company appointed Touche Remnant as Investment Manager and in 1982 the name was changed to TR City of London Trust PLC. It was brought under the management of Henderson Group after Henderson bought Touche Remnant in 1992. The name of the company was changed to The City of London Investment Trust plc in October 1997.
