= Henderson Far East Income =

British investment trust

- Traded as: LSE: HFEL; FTSE 250 component
- Industry: Investment trust
- Founded: 1930
- Headquarters: London, UK
- Key people: Ronald Gould (chair); Sat Duhra (manager)
- Website: Official site

Henderson Far East Income Limited (LSE: HFEL), is a large British investment trust focused on investments in the Asia Pacific Region. The company is listed on the London Stock Exchange and is a constituent of the FTSE 250 Index.

== History ==
The company was established by the City of London Real Property Company as the C. L. R. P. Investment Trust in May 1930. In the mid-20th century, it diversified its focus towards investments in Australia and New Zealand.

In April 1982, the company appointed Touche Remnant as investment manager and it became the TR Australia Investment Trust. It changed its name to the TR Far East Income Trust in December 1989 and was brought under the management of Henderson Group after Henderson bought Touche Remnant in 1992. It adopted its current name in July 1997. Sat Duhra became the manager of the trust following the retirement of co-manager Mike Kerley in 2023.

The company is managed by Janus Henderson and the chairman is Ronald Gould.
