= Invesco Bond Income Plus =

Investment company

- Formerly: City Merchants High Yield Trust (1991–2021)
- Traded as: LSE: BIPS
- Industry: Investment management
- Founded: 31 May 1991; 35 years ago
- Key people: Mark Bridgeman (Chair)
- Website: Official site

Invesco Bond Income Plus Limited (LSE: BIPS) is a Jersey domiciled investment company that aims to provide capital growth and high income, investing mainly in high-yielding fixed-interest securities.

Its shares are listed on the London Stock Exchange and it is part of the Association of Investment Companies Debt Loans and Bonds sector. As of September 2026, the company had total assets of approximately £495 million.

== History ==
The business was launched in 1991 as City Merchants High Yield Trust and has been through two corporate reconstructions, the most recent in 2012 when it was transferred to its current Jersey company.

In March 2021, the company agreed to merge with Invesco Enhanced Income, another Jersey-based bond fund managed by Invesco, acquiring approximately £130 million of net assets under the scheme. Following shareholder approval in May 2021, it adopted its current name and its ticker changed from CMHY to BIPS.

The portfolio has been managed by Rhys Davies since 2014 and by Edward Craven since 2020. Mark Bridgeman succeeded Tim Scholefield as chair following the company's annual general meeting in June 2026.

== See also ==
- Invesco Global Equity Income Trust
- Invesco Asia Dragon Trust
