= Henderson European Trust =

British investment trust

- Company type: Investment trust
- Traded as: LSE: HET; FTSE 250 component
- Industry: Investments
- Founded: 1947; 78 years ago
- Headquarters: London, United Kingdom
- Website: Official website

Henderson European Trust (LSE: HET), is a large British investment trust predominantly focused on listed investments in European Companies. It is managed by Janus Henderson and the chair is Vicky Hastings. It was listed on the London Stock Exchange until its assets were acquired by Fidelity European Trust in September 2025.

== History ==
The company was established as the London and Gartmore Investment Trust in January 1947. It changed its name to the Gartmore European Investment Trust in November 1986 and, after the Gartmore Group was acquired by Henderson Group in 2011, it became the Henderson European Focus Trust in November 2011. It underwent a scheme of reconstruction when it absorbed the assets of Henderson Eurotrust and then changed its name to Henderson European Trust in July 2024. On 19 June 2025, it was announced that, following manager resignations at Janus Henderson, Fidelity European Trust would acquire the assets of Henderson European Trust, which would subsequently be wound up. The transaction was completed on 29 September 2025.
