= European Smaller Companies Trust =

British investment trust

- Formerly: TR European Growth Trust
- Type: Public company
- Traded as: LSE: ESCT; FTSE 250 Index
- Industry: Investment trust
- Founded: 1990; 36 years ago
- Founder: Henderson Group
- Headquarters: London, United Kingdom
- Area served: Worldwide
- Key people: James Williams (chairman); Ollie Beckett (manager)
- Products: Investments in Europe's dynamic smaller businesses for capital growth
- Website: official website

European Smaller Companies Trust, formerly TR European Growth Trust, is a large British investment trust focused on investments in smaller European companies for capital growth. Established in 1990, the company is a constituent of the FTSE 250 Index, an index of the larger companies on the London Stock Exchange. The company is managed by Ollie Beckett of Janus Henderson and the chairman is James Williams.

== History ==
The company was established as the TR European Growth Trust under the management of Touche Remnant in 1990. It was brought under the management of Henderson Group after Henderson bought Touche Remnant in 1992. It changed its name from TR European Growth Trust to European Smaller Companies Trust in October 2021.

In June 2025, it was announced that the company would acquire the assets of the European Assets Trust which would then be placed in liquidation.
