= Advance Developing Markets Trust =

Defunct British investment trust

- Type: Public Limited Company
- Traded as: Formerly LSE: ADD
- Industry: Investments
- Founded: May 14, 1998
- Founder: Peter O'Connor and James Robinson
- Defunct: October 24, 2018
- Fate: Dissolved
- Headquarters: London, United Kingdom
- Products: Investments in emerging markets

Advance Developing Markets Trust was a large British investment trust dedicated to investments in emerging markets. Established in 1998, the company was a constituent of the FTSE 250 Index until September 2008 when it was dissolved. It was a fund of funds and so invested indirectly in emerging markets through other funds and was managed by Progressive Assets Management. The Chairman was Peter O'Connor.
