= Murray International Trust =

Scottish investment trust

Murray International Trust plc
- Formerly: The Scottish Western Investment Company Limited
- Company type: Public
- Traded as: LSE: MYI; FTSE 250 component
- Industry: Investment management
- Founded: 18 December 1907; 117 years ago
- Headquarters: Edinburgh, United Kingdom
- Key people: Virginia Holmes; Bruce Stout; Martin Connaghan; Samantha Fitzpatrick

Murray International Trust plc is a large UK investment trust investing principally in global equities. It is listed on the London Stock Exchange and it is a constituent of the FTSE 250 Index.

== History ==
The company was established as the Scottish Western Investment Company in 1907. After its manager, Murray Johnstone, was acquired by Aberdeen Asset Management in October 2000, it came under the management of Aberdeen.

The trust is considered a "Next Generation Dividend Hero" by the Association of Investment Companies, having increased its dividend consecutively for 19 years. It currently has a 4 crown rating from Trustnet, and a 3 star rating from Morningstar.

The chair is Virginia Holmes, and its fund managers are Bruce Stout, Martin Connaghan and Samantha Fitzpatrick from Aberdeen Group plc.
