= GCP =

GCP may refer to:

== Companies and organizations ==
- GCP Applied Technologies, an American chemical company
- GCP Infrastructure Investments, a British investment trust
- Global Centre for Pluralism, in Ottawa, Canada
- Global Charity Project, a student-run organization at Marymount University
- Global Carbon Project, an organisation that studies greenhouse gas emissions
- Globis Capital Partners, a Japanese venture capital firm
- Grand Central Partnership, a not-for-profit corporation that manages a business improvement area in New York City, US
- Greater Cambridge Partnership, a 'City Deal' in the UK since 2013

=== Political parties ===
- German Communist Party
- Ghana Congress Party, a political party of the Gold Coast
- Grand Commonwealth Party, active in the 2021 Bahamian general election

=== Military ===
- Commando Parachute Group (French: Groupement des commandos parachutistes), French special forces
- Group of Popular Combatants (Spanish: Grupos de Combatientes Populares), an Ecuadorean insurgence group

== Science and technology ==
- Giantin, a protein
- Good clinical practice, an international quality standard for clinical trials

=== Computing ===
- Games Computers Play, a 1980s online gaming service
- Google Cloud Platform, a suite of computing services offered by Google
- Google Cloud Print, a Google service that prints documents
- Ground control point, in geographic information system image rectification

== Other uses ==
- Global Consciousness Project, a parapsychology experiment attempting to detect possible interactions of "global consciousness" with physical systems
- Grand Central Parkway, a road in New York City, US
- Greater Chennai Police, law enforcement agency in Chennai, India
