= Schroder Japan Trust =

British investment trust

Schroder Japan Trust plc
- Formerly: Schroder Japan Growth Fund plc (1994 to 2023)
- Type: Public
- Traded as: LSE: SJG; FTSE SmallCap constituent
- Industry: Investment trust
- Founded: July 1994
- Headquarters: London, United Kingdom
- Key people: Philip Kay (chairman); Masaki Taketsume (portfolio manager)
- Products: Investment fund
- Website: schroders.com

Schroder Japan Trust plc is a United Kingdom based investment trust that invests principally in equities listed on the Japanese stock markets. Launched in July 1994, the company is listed on the London Stock Exchange and is a constituent of the FTSE SmallCap Index. It is managed by Schroder Investment Management, part of Schroders, with Masaki Taketsume as portfolio manager, and its chairman is Philip Kay.

The company's objective is to achieve capital growth from an actively managed portfolio principally comprising securities listed on the Japanese stock markets, with the aim of achieving returns in excess of the Tokyo Stock Price Index Total Return in sterling over the longer term. It belongs to the Association of Investment Companies 'Japan' sector.

== History ==
The company was incorporated on 12 May 1994 as Schroder Japan Growth Fund plc and launched in July of that year.

Andrew Rose managed the portfolio from 1 November 2007 until his retirement from the industry in June 2019. Masaki Taketsume, who had relocated from Tokyo to London in 2017 as part of a succession plan, assumed formal responsibility for the portfolio from 1 July 2019.

In April 2023 the company changed its name from Schroder Japan Growth Fund plc to Schroder Japan Trust plc. In 2024 the board adopted an enhanced dividend policy under which the company aims to pay an annual dividend equivalent to 4% of net asset value. In 2026 it reduced its management fee and moved to charging the fee on the lower of net asset value or market capitalisation.
