= Schroder AsiaPacific Fund =

Investment trust

- Company type: Public company
- Traded as: LSE: SDP; FTSE 250 constituent
- Industry: Investment
- Founded: 1995; 31 years ago
- Headquarters: London, United Kingdom
- Products: Investment fund
- Website: www.schroders.com/en-gb/uk/individual/funds-and-strategies/investment-trusts/schroder-asiapacific-fund-plc/

Schroder AsiaPacific Fund plc is a large United Kingdom-based investment trust focused predominantly on equity holdings in companies located in Asia and countries bordering the Pacific Ocean (but excluding the Middle East, Japan and Australasia). Established in November 1995, the company is listed on the London Stock Exchange and is a constituent of the FTSE 250 Index. The fund is currently managed by Abbas Barkhordar and Richard Sennitt from Schroders. It was previously managed by Matthew Dobbs of Schroders since its inception and its chairman is James Williams.

The Company belongs in the Association of Investment Companies 'Asia Pacific' sector and (as at October 2025) is the largest in the sector by total assets.

In 2025, the Company was recognised in the Association of Investment Companies 'ISA Millionaire' shortlist, which are investment trusts that would have made investors more than one million pounds had they invested their entire annual ISA allowance in the same trust each year from 1999 to 2024.
