= Ecofin Water & Power Opportunities =

Ecofin Water & Power Opportunities (LSE: ECW) was a large British investment trust dedicated to investments in the water, power and gas sectors in the United Kingdom, Eurozone, North America and other OECD countries. Established in 2002, the company was a constituent of the FTSE 250 Index. The chairman was Ian Barby. After shareholders were given shares in a new entity, Ecofin Global Utilities and Infrastructure Trust plc, the trust ceased activities in June 2016.
