= BlackRock Throgmorton Trust =

British investment trust

BlackRock Throgmorton Trust plc
- Traded as: LSE: THRG
- Industry: Investment trust
- Founded: 1962; 64 years ago
- Headquarters: London, United Kingdom
- Website: Official Site

BlackRock Throgmorton Trust (LSE: THRG) is a large British investment trust dedicated to small and mid-sized company investments. It was listed on the London Stock Exchange and was a constituent of the FTSE 250 Index until shareholders decided to place it in voluntary liquidation in April 2026. The chairman is Chris Samuel.

== History ==
The company was established as The Throgmorton Trust in December 1962. The company owned, in the early 1980s, a subsidiary known as Capital for Industry which acquired majority interests in consumer businesses such as Morphy Richards.

The fund has been managed by BlackRock since July 2008.

In February 2026, BlackRock announced that BlackRock Throgmorton Trust would merge with BlackRock Smaller Companies Trust. This would be achieved by the transfer of assets from BlackRock Throgmorton Trust and the subsequent winding up of that company. A resolution to place the company into members' voluntary liquidation was approved at a general meeting on 16 April 2026.

== See also ==
- BlackRock Smaller Companies Trust
- BlackRock Greater Europe Investment Trust
- BlackRock World Mining Trust
