= Paul Manduca =

British business executive

Paul Victor Falzon Sant Manduca
- Born: 15 November 1951 (age 74); London
- Citizenship: British and Maltese
- Education: Hertford College, Oxford; Harrow School

Paul Victor Falzon Sant Manduca (born 15 November 1951) was chairman of Prudential plc in the United Kingdom from July 2012 until December 2020. Manduca was awarded a Maltese Order of Merit in 2018.

== Early life and education ==
Manduca was born in London and educated at Harrow School, before earning a degree in modern languages at Hertford College, Oxford University from 1970 to 1973.

He is the eldest of six children. His father built up a security business, which he sold to Securicor.

== Executive career ==
Manduca joined the broking firm Colgrave & Co after graduation, before moving into asset management.

Manduca became a portfolio manager at Rowe & Pitman, which later become part of S G Warburg, before running a range of funds and eventually becoming head of small company funds at Hill Samuel Asset Management in the early 1980s; the peak period for the Unlisted Securities Market.

In 1983 he joined Touche Remnant, the investment trust manager and was appointed CEO of the TR Smaller Companies Investment Trust and TR Industrial and General Trust. In 1989 he became CEO of Touche Remnant and engineered a £50m takeover by French banking group Société Générale. The French bank subsequently sold Touche to Henderson Group, in 1992. From 1994 to 1999, Manduca was founding CEO of Threadneedle Asset Management Limited, during which time he was also a director of Eagle Star Insurance and Allied Dunbar. Between 1999 and 2002 he was CEO of Rothschild Asset Management and was European CEO of Deutsche Asset Management from 2002 to 2005.

== Non-executive roles ==
Manduca has held several directorships, including as a non-executive director of Wm Morrison Supermarkets plc, the UK supermarket chain, from 2005 to 2011. During that time, he was the senior independent director, a member of the nomination committee and chairman of the remuneration committee, and prior to that he set up the audit committee.

He was a director and chairman of the risk and reinsurance company Aon UK Limited from 2006 to 2012. He chaired Bridgewell Group plc from 2006 to 2008, and was a director and chairman of JPMorgan European Smaller Companies Investment Trust from 2005 to 2012.

Manduca was chairman of Prudential plc from 2012 to 2020. He joined the board of Prudential plc as the senior independent director in 2010, serving as a member of Prudential’s audit and remuneration committees from 2010 to 2012 and as a member of the nomination committee from 2011 until he was made chairman of the board and chairman of the nomination committee in 2012.

In 2015 he became chairman of the Templeton Emerging Markets Investment Trust.

In July 2017, Manduca became chairman of RateSetter, an online peer to peer lending company.

== Wider industry roles ==
He was chairman of the Association of Investment Companies from 1991 to 1993, and is a former member of the Takeover Panel. Manduca was also chairman of CityUK Leadership Council from 2015 to 2019.
