= Brunner Investment Trust =

British investment trust

Brunner Investment Trust plc
- Type: Public company
- Traded as: LSE: BUT; FTSE 250 component
- Industry: Investment Management
- Founded: 3 December 1927; 98 years ago
- Website: www.brunner.co.uk

Brunner Investment Trust (LSE: BUT), is a large British investment trust focused on investments in global equities. The company is listed on the London Stock Exchange and is a constituent of the FTSE 250 Index.

== History ==
The Brunner Investment Trust was formed by the Brunner family, which originated from Switzerland and, in 1832, migrated to Lancashire, where they formed Brunner Mond & Co in 1873. The Brunner Investment Trust was formed in 1927 from the proceeds on disposal of the Brunner family's interest in Brunner Mond & Co, the largest of the four companies which came to form Imperial Chemical Industries the previous year.

The Brunner Investment Trust joined the FTSE 250 Index in May 2024. The company is managed by Allianz Global Investors and chair is Carolan Dobson. The Brunner family continue to be significant shareholders with the former Lord Lieutenant of Oxfordshire, Sir Hugo Brunner, holding 2.3% beneficially and 12.0% as trustee, and the charitable trust established by Timothy Barnabas Hans Brunner holding 0.4% beneficially and 6.0% as a trustee. The charitable trust established by Timothy Barnabas Hans Brunner continues to carry out philanthropic activities in Oxfordshire.
