= BH Macro =

British investment company

- Company type: Public company
- Traded as: LSE: BHMG; FTSE 250 Index component
- Industry: Investment trust
- Founded: 2007; 18 years ago
- Headquarters: Saint Peter Port, Guernsey
- Key people: Richard Horlick (chair)

BH Macro Limited (LSE: BHMG) is a large British investment company dedicated to the global fixed income and foreign exchange markets. Established in 2007, the company is a "feeder" fund into a fund managed by hedge fund Brevan Howard. The chairman is Richard Horlick. It is listed on the London Stock Exchange and is a constituent of the FTSE 250 Index.
