= Temple Bar Investment Trust =

UK business

- Company type: Public
- Traded as: LSE: TMPL; FTSE 250 component
- Industry: financial service activities, except insurance and pension funding
- Founded: 1926; 100 years ago
- Headquarters: London, England
- Key people: Charles Cade (chair)
- Website: www.templebarinvestments.co.uk

Temple Bar Investment Trust (LSE: TMPL) is a large British investment trust dedicated to investments in UK securities. It is listed on the London Stock Exchange and is a constituent of the FTSE 250 Index.

== History ==
The company was established as the Telephone and General Trust in 1926. It was a subsidiary of Automatic Telephone and Electric Company in its early years. At that time, it arranged credit facilities for export orders for its parent company. After diversifying its activities into general investment, it adopted its current name in 1977. The trust is managed by Redwheel and the chairman is Charles Cade.
