= Sequoia Economic Infrastructure Income Fund =

British investment trust

- Company type: Public
- Traded as: LSE: SEQI; FTSE 250 component
- Founded: 2015; 11 years ago
- Headquarters: Saint Peter Port, Guernsey
- Key people: James Stewart (chair)
- Website: www.seqifund.com

Sequoia Economic Infrastructure Income Fund (LSE: SEQI) is a large British investment trust dedicated to the provision of debt instruments for infrastructure projects. Established in 2015, the company is a constituent of the FTSE 250 Index. The chairman is James Stewart and the Investment Advisor is Sequoia Investment Management Company.
