= Personal Assets Trust =

British investment trust

- Company type: Public
- Traded as: LSE: PNL; FTSE 250 component
- Founded: 1983; 42 years ago
- Headquarters: Edinburgh, Scotland
- Key people: Iain Ferguson (chair)
- Website: www.patplc.co.uk

Personal Assets Trust is a large British investment trust. The company is listed on the London Stock Exchange and is a constituent of the FTSE 250 Index. The chairman is Iain Ferguson CBE.

== History ==
The company was established through a rights issue by a much larger fund, Atlantic Assets, managed by Ivory and Sime, in 1983. In 1990, an asset manager with Ivory and Sime, Ian Rushbrook, took over the management of the company and decided that it should be "run expressly for private investors". Over the next 18 years, he grew the business significantly and also used it as a vehicle to protect his own family's financial interests. In 2009, it came under the management of Troy Asset Management, who subsequently appointed Sebastian Lyon and, from 2025, Charlotte Yonge as managers of the fund.
