= Scottish Investment Trust =

Investment trust of the United Kingdom

- Company type: Public
- Traded as: LSE: SCIN
- Industry: Investment management
- Founded: 1887; 139 years ago
- Headquarters: London, United Kingdom
- Key people: James Will, Chair
- Website: www.thescottish.co.uk

Scottish Investment Trust (LSE: SCIN) was an investment trust with a global investment mandate. Established in 1887, the company, which was based in Edinburgh, was listed on the London Stock Exchange.

In September 2022, the company completed a combination of assets with JPMorgan Global Growth & Income, bringing an end to the trust's 135-year history.
