= Ashoka India Equity Investment Trust =

British investment trust

- Company type: Public company
- Traded as: LSE: AIE; FTSE 250 Index component
- Industry: Investment trust
- Founded: 2018; 7 years ago
- Headquarters: London, England
- Key people: Andrew Watkins (chair)
- Website: www.ashokaindiaequity.com

Ashoka India Equity Investment Trust plc (LSE: AIE), is a large British investment trust focused on investments in companies that are listed in India or have a significant presence there. The company is listed on the London Stock Exchange and is a constituent of the FTSE 250 Index.

== History ==
Established in 2018, the company is managed by White Oak Capital Management, which is led by Prashant Khemka, who built up the India and emerging-markets funds at Goldman Sachs. The company explained, in March 2025, that one of the factors causing the growth in net assets was the protectionist policies of the United States, which was causing businesses to relocate from China to India. The chair is Andrew Watkins.
