= HICL Infrastructure Company =

British investment company

- Traded as: LSE: HICL; FTSE 250 component
- Industry: Investment trust
- Founded: 2006
- Headquarters: British
- Website: hicl.com

HICL Infrastructure Company (formerly HSBC Infrastructure Company Ltd) is a large British investment company dedicated to infrastructure investments. It is listed on the London Stock Exchange and it is a constituent of the FTSE 250 Index. The company is managed by InfraRed Capital Partners and the chairman is Mike Bane.

== History ==
The company was established in 2006. In November 2025, it was announced that the assets of The Renewables Infrastructure Group would be transferred to HICL Infrastructure Company and that The Renewables Infrastructure Group would subsequently be wound up. After a shareholder revolt, the proposed transaction was abandoned in December 2025.

== Operations ==
The company is focused on three segments: public–private partnership (PPP) and private finance initiative (PFI) (social and transport projects), regulated assets (gas and electricity transmission and distribution, and water utilities) and demand-based assets (such as toll road concessions and student accommodation). Portfolio Investments are located primarily in the United Kingdom, but also in Australia, North America and Europe and investments are generally operational.
