= North Atlantic Smaller Companies Investment Trust =

British investment trust

North Atlantic Smaller Companies Investment Trust Plc
- Company type: Public company
- Traded as: LSE: NAS; Constituent FTSE 250 Index
- Industry: Investment trust
- Founded: 1973; 52 years ago
- Headquarters: London, United Kingdom
- Key people: Christopher Mills (CEO)
- Products: Investments
- AUM: £740 million
- Website: www.nascit.co.uk

North Atlantic Smaller Companies Investment Trust is a large British investment trust focused on investments in smaller companies in North America. The company is listed on the London Stock Exchange and is a constituent of the FTSE 250 Index.

== History ==
The company was established as the Montagu Boston Investment Trust in 1973. It became the Consolidated Venture Trust in 1984 and North Atlantic Smaller Companies Investment Trust in 1993.

It is managed by Christopher Mills, who has been the chief executive officer since 1982, and the chairman is Sir Charles Wake.
