= BlackRock Greater Europe Investment Trust =

British investment trust

BlackRock Greater Europe Investment Trust plc
- Formerly: Merrill Lynch Greater Europe Investment Trust plc (2004–2008)
- Traded as: LSE: BRGE; FTSE 250 component
- Industry: Investment trust
- Founded: 2004; 22 years ago
- Headquarters: London, United Kingdom
- Website: Official site

BlackRock Greater Europe Investment Trust plc (LSE: BRGE) is a large British investment trust dedicated to small, mid and large-sized European company investments. The chairman is Eric Sanderson.

== History ==
The company was established by Merrill as the Merrill Lynch Greater Europe Investment Trust in June 2004. Following the merger of Merrill Lynch Investment Management with BlackRock in February 2006, it adopted the current name in 2008.

== See also ==
- BlackRock Smaller Companies Trust
- BlackRock Throgmorton Trust
- BlackRock World Mining Trust
