= Herald Investment Trust =

United Kingdom-based investment trust

Herald Investment Trust plc
- Traded as: LSE: HRI; FTSE 250 component
- Industry: Investment trust
- Founded: February 1994
- Headquarters: British
- Website: Official website

Herald Investment Trust plc is a large United Kingdom-based investment trust focused predominantly on holdings of quoted small- and mid-cap technology, communications and media companies. The company is listed on the London Stock Exchange and is a constituent of the FTSE 250 Index.

== History ==
The company was launched in February 1994. In January 2026, the company, which is 30% owned by Saba Capital Management, launched a tender offer to allow shareholders to exit at close to net asset value before any change of control. The fund is managed under the auspices of Herald Investment Management and its chairman is Andrew Joy.
