= Polar Capital Global Healthcare Trust =

British investment trust

Polar Capital Global Healthcare Trust (LSE: PCGH), is a large British investment trust focused on investments in the health sector. The company is listed on the London Stock Exchange and is a constituent of the FTSE 250 Index.

== History ==
The company was established as Polar Capital Global Healthcare Growth and Income Trust in May 2010 and adopted its current name in June 2017. As of August 2025, its largest investments included AstraZeneca, Eli Lilly and Company and UnitedHealth Group.

In October 2025, the company asked investors to change the status of the trust from that with a limited term of eight years to one with an unlimited life, but with the opportunity for investors to exit the trust every five years.

It is managed by Polar Capital and the chair is Lisa Arnold.
