= JPMorgan European Discovery =

British investment trust

- Type: Public company
- Traded as: LSE: JEDT; FTSE 250 Index component
- ISIN: GB00BMTS0Z37
- Industry: Investment trust
- Founded: 1990; 36 years ago
- Headquarters: 25 Bank Street, Canary Wharf, London, England
- Key people: Marc van Gelder (Chairman)

JPMorgan European Discovery (LSE: JEDT) is a large British investment trust, dedicated to investments in smaller European companies. The Chairman is Marc van Gelder. It is listed on the London Stock Exchange and is a constituent of the FTSE 250 Index.

== History ==
The company was established as the Fleming European Fledgeling Investment Trust under the management of Robert Fleming & Co. in 1990. After Robert Fleming & Co. was acquired by Chase Manhattan in April 2000, and Chase Manhattan merged with J.P. Morgan & Co. in December 2000, it was brought under the management of J.P. Morgan & Co. It changed its name to the JPMorgan Fleming European Fledgeling Investment Trust in 2002 and then, following JPMorgan's decision to drop the Fleming brand, it became the JPMorgan European Fledgeling Investment Trust in 2006. It went on to become the JPMorgan European Smaller Companies Trust in 2010, and adopted its current name on 15 June 2021.
