= Fidelity European Trust =

British investment trust

Fidelity China Special Situations
- Company type: Public company
- Traded as: LSE: FEV; FTSE 250 component
- Industry: Investment
- Founded: 1991; 35 years ago
- Headquarters: London, United Kingdom
- Website: investment-trusts.fidelity.co.uk/fidelity-european-trust/

Fidelity European Trust is a large British investment trust dedicated to long-term investments across Continental Europe. Established in 1991, the company is a constituent of the FTSE 250 Index. The chairman is Vivian Bazalgette. The Trust is managed by Fidelity International. The company changed its name from Fidelity European Values to Fidelity European Trust on 1 October 2020. On 19 June 2025, it was announced that, following manager resignations at Janus Henderson, Fidelity European Trust would acquire the assets of Henderson European Trust, which would subsequently be wound up. The transaction was completed on 29 September 2025.
