= Biopharma Credit =

British investment trust

- Company type: Public company
- Traded as: LSE: BPCR; FTSE 250 Index component
- Industry: Investment trust
- Founded: 2017; 8 years ago
- Headquarters: London
- Key people: Harry Hyman (chair)

Biopharma Credit (LSE: BPCR), is a large British investment trust focused on investments in debt secured on life science products. The company is listed on the London Stock Exchange and is a constituent of the FTSE 250 Index.

== History ==
Established in 2017, the company has invested in loan stock issued by a broad range of life sciences businesses such as Collegium Pharmaceutical, for pain management therapy development, in February 2020, Insmed, for disease therapy development, in October 2022, and Sarepta Therapeutics, for precision genetic medicines development, in December 2019.

The company is managed by Pharmakon Advisors, and the chairman is Harry Hyman.
