= Templeton Emerging Markets Investment Trust =

British investment trust

- Company type: Public
- Traded as: LSE: TEM; FTSE 250 component
- Founded: 1989; 37 years ago
- Headquarters: Edinburgh, Scotland
- Key people: Angus Macpherson (chair)
- Website: www.temit.co.uk

Templeton Emerging Markets Investment Trust (TEMIT) (LSE: TEM) (SEDOL 0882929, ISIN GB0008829292) is a large global emerging markets investment trust. Established in 1989, it is listed on the London Stock Exchange and is a constituent of the FTSE 250 Index. The investment management is conducted by Franklin Templeton Investment Management Limited, which is a subsidiary of Franklin Templeton Investments. The chairman is Angus Macpherson.
