= Syncona =

British investment trust

- Company type: Public
- Traded as: LSE: SYNC; FTSE 250 component
- Founded: 2012; 13 years ago
- Headquarters: Saint Peter Port, Guernsey
- Key people: Melanie Gee (chair)
- Website: www.synconaltd.com

Syncona (LSE: SYNC) is a large British closed-ended investment trust dedicated to life science investments. Co-founded as Syncona Partners in 2012 by former CEO Martin Murphy and the Wellcome Trust, before merging with the Battle Against Cancer Investment Trust ('BACIT') in December 2016 and listing publicly, the company is listed on the London Stock Exchange and is a constituent of the FTSE 250 Index. Its Chair is Melanie Gee.
