= Global Smaller Companies Trust =

British investment trust (est. 1889)

The Global Smaller Companies Trust plc
- Formerly: Alliance Investment plc F&C Alliance Investment plc F&C Smaller Companies plc Foreign & Colonial Smaller Companies plc F&C Global Smaller Companies plc BMO Global Smaller Companies plc
- Type: Public
- Traded as: LSE: GSCT; FTSE 250 component
- Founded: 15 February 1889; 137 years ago
- Headquarters: London, United Kingdom
- Key people: Graham Oldroyd (Chairman); Nish Patel (Fund manager)
- Website: www.globalsmallers.co.uk

The Global Smaller Companies Trust is a large British investment trust dedicated to investments in smaller companies on a worldwide basis. The company is listed on the London Stock Exchange and is a constituent of the FTSE 250 Index. It is managed by Nish Patel of Columbia Threadneedle Investments.

== History ==
The company was established as Alliance Investment in February 1889. At that time, it invested in foreign government bonds, but refocussed on smaller companies in 1975.

After F&C Asset Management secured the mandate, it became F&C Alliance Investment in February 1984, F&C Smaller Companies in January 1988, Foreign & Colonial Smaller Companies in August 1991, F&C Smaller Companies in July 2001 and F&C Global Smaller Companies in December 2005. Following the acquisition of F&C Asset Management by BMO Financial Group, it changed its name from F&C Global Smaller Companies plc to BMO Global Smaller Companies in November 2018.

After Columbia Threadneedle Investments acquired BMO Global Asset Management's EMEA business, the trust changed its name from BMO Global Smaller Companies to The Global Smaller Companies Trust in June 2022.

With effect from 1 May 2026, the trust adopted the MSCI ACWI Small Cap Index as its benchmark, replacing a composite of global (excluding UK) and UK smaller companies indices. The chairman is Graham Oldroyd.
