= Fidelity China Special Situations =

British investment trust

- Company type: Public company
- Traded as: LSE: FCSS; FTSE 250 component
- Industry: Investment
- Founded: 2010; 16 years ago
- Headquarters: London, United Kingdom
- Website: investment-trusts.fidelity.co.uk/fidelity-china-special-situations/

Fidelity China Special Situations is a large British investment trust dedicated to long-term investments in Asia. Established in 2010, the company is a constituent of the FTSE 250 Index. The chairman is Nicholas Bull. The fund is managed by Dale Nicholls of Fidelity International.
