= Utilico Emerging Markets =

- Company type: Public company
- Traded as: LSE: UEM; FTSE 250 component
- Industry: Investment
- Founded: 2005; 21 years ago
- Headquarters: Epsom, Surrey, United Kingdom
- Website: www.uemtrust.co.uk

Utilico Emerging Markets Trust plc (LSE: UEM) is a large British investment trust dedicated to investments in infrastructure, utility and related sectors in the emerging markets of Asia, Latin America, Emerging Europe and Africa. The company is managed by ICM Limited, which is authorised and regulated by the Financial Conduct Authority. Established in 2005, it is a listed on the London Stock Exchange and became a constituent of the FTSE 250 Index in December 2025. The Chairman is Mark Bridgeman.

== Awards ==
UEM has won a number of awards and acknowledgements, including:

- 2014 Moneywise Investment Trust Awards - Winner, Global Emerging Markets
- 2015 Moneywise Investment Trust Awards - Winner, Global Emerging Markets
- 2016 Money Observer Trust Awards - Highly Commended, Best Emerging Market Trust
- 2024 Morningstar rated
- 2025 The AIC 'Next Generation Dividend Hero'
