= AVI Global Trust =

British investment trust

- Formerly: Transvaal Mortgage Loan and Finance Company (1889–1906); British Empire Land Mortgage and Loan Company (1906–1964); British Empire Securities and General Trust Limited (1964–2015); British Empire Trust (2015–2019)
- Type: Public company
- Traded as: LSE: AGT; FTSE 250 component
- Industry: Investment Management
- Founded: 6 February 1889; 137 years ago in London, UK
- Headquarters: London, United Kingdom
- Area served: Worldwide
- Key people: Graham Kitchen (Chairman); Joe Bauernfreund (Investment Manager)
- AUM: ▲GBP £1.3 Billion (December 2025)
- Website: Official website

AVI Global Trust is a London-based British investment trust. The company is a constituent of the FTSE 250 Index. The chairman is Graham Kitchen.

== History ==
The company was established in 1889 as the Transvaal Mortgage Loan and Finance Company, led by chairman W.J. Thompson, and invested in what is now South Africa.

It was renamed the British Empire Land Mortgage and Loan Company in 1906, and British Empire Securities and General Trust in 1964.

Asset Value Investors (AVI), an employee-owned management company, was established to manage the firm, then valued at £6 million, in 1985.

The company's goal of acquiring other companies trading below their Net Asset Value led it to attempt takeovers of other investment trusts trading at a discount. In 1986, the company acquired Ashdown Investment Trust for £66 million. In 1989, it mounted a hostile takeover bid for Schroder Global Trust: it had been building up a stake in the target company over a two-year period. In 1995, it acquired the Selective Assets Trust (formerly the Edinburgh Assets Trust) for £42 million.

It simplified its name from British Empire Securities and General Trust to British Empire Trust in 2015.

In 2016, the activist US hedge fund, Elliott Management Corporation, built up a large stake in the company. The investment was seen as one of Elliott's successful investment positions in the UK.

It changed its name from British Empire Trust to AVI Global Trust in May 2019.

Between 2019 and 2020, the company invested heavily in SoftBank Group and other Japanese stocks. The company's strategy has been to take advantage of Softbank's share buyback programme. This has supported the company's market capitalisation on the London Stock Exchange which was £751 million in July 2020. It has also built up a significant holding in Pershing Square Holdings, a hedge fund.

In August 2026, the trust's investment manager, Asset Value Investors, agreed to be sold to Pacific Asset Management, part of the Australian group Pinnacle Investment Management, subject to regulatory approval. The trust said its investment objective, policy and management team would be unchanged.

== ESG Investing ==
AVI became a signatory of the Principles for Responsible Investment (PRI) in April 2021.
