= Pantheon Infrastructure =

British investment trust

- Company type: Public
- Traded as: LSE: PINT; FTSE 250 component
- Founded: 2021; 4 years ago
- Headquarters: London, United Kingdom
- Key people: Patrick O'Donnell Bourke (chair)
- Website: www.pantheoninfrastructure.com

Pantheon Infrastructure plc (LSE: PINT), is a large British investment trust focused on investments in infrastructure assets across North America and Europe. The company is listed on the London Stock Exchange and is a constituent of the FTSE 250 Index.

== History ==
Although the team at Pantheon Ventures have been investing in infrastructure assets since 1997, Pantheon Infrastructure was first listed on the London Stock Exchange only in October 2021. It disposed of its largest single holding, an investment in the US power business, Calpine, in January 2025. The disposal formed part of a much larger transaction.

As of May 2025, its other significant holdings included investments in the Dutch electrical infrastructure provider, Fudura, in the European logistics business, Primafrio, and in the Irish telecommunications operator, National Broadband Ireland, as well as in the British gas transmission operator, National Gas.

It is managed by Pantheon Ventures and the chairman is Patrick O'Donnell Bourke, who took over that role on 19 June 2025.
