= The Renewables Infrastructure Group =

British investment trust focused on renewable assets

Renewables Infrastructure Group Ltd
- Traded as: LSE: TRIG; FTSE 250 Component
- ISIN: GG00BBHX2H91
- Founded: 2013; 13 years ago
- Headquarters: Saint Peter Port, Guernsey
- Key people: Richard Morse (Chairman)
- Website: trig-ltd.com

The Renewables Infrastructure Group (LSE: TRIG) is a large British investment trust dedicated to investments in assets generating electricity from renewable sources. The company is listed on the London Stock Exchange and a constituent of the FTSE 250 Index. The company is managed by InfraRed Capital Partners and the chairman is Richard Morse.

== History ==
The company was established in 2013. In November 2025, it was announced that the assets of The Renewables Infrastructure Group would be transferred to HICL Infrastructure Company and that The Renewables Infrastructure Group would subsequently be wound up. After a shareholder revolt, the proposed transaction was abandoned in December 2025.

== Operations ==
The size of the portfolio can be summarised as follows:

The Renewables Infrastructure Group Portfolio Statistics
Year	Number of projects	Portfolio generation capacity
2024	83	2,653MW
2023	86	2,785MW
2022	89	2,820MW
2021	83	2,200MW
2020	77	1,820MW
2019	74	1,664MW
2018	62	1,110MW
2017	57	821MW
2016	53	716MW
