= JPMorgan Emerging Markets Dividend Income =

British investment trust

- Type: Public company
- Traded as: LSE: JEMI; FTSE 250 Index component
- ISIN: GB00B5ZZY915
- Industry: Investment trust
- Founded: 2010; 16 years ago
- Headquarters: 25 Bank Street, Canary Wharf, London, England
- Key people: Elisabeth Scott (Chair)

JPMorgan Emerging Markets Dividend Income (LSE: JEMI) is a large British investment trust. Established in 2010, it is dedicated to investing in companies with high dividend yields in emerging markets. The chair is Elisabeth Scott. It is listed on the London Stock Exchange and FTSE Russell announced on 29 January 2026 that it would become a constituent of the FTSE 250 Index on 3 February 2026.

== History ==
The company was established in 2010 as the JPMorgan Global Emerging Markets Income Trust. It achieved the highest one-year return of all stocks on brokers' "buy lists" in 2025. This reflected renewed interest in emerging markets in general, and in the company in particular, in the context of geopolitical instability and international tariff policy in January 2026. The company adopted its current name on 15 January 2026.
