= JPMorgan Emerging Markets Growth & Income =

Investment trust

JPMorgan Emerging Markets Growth and Income
- Type: Public company
- Traded as: LSE: JMGI; FTSE 250 Index component
- ISIN: GB00BMXWN182
- Industry: Investment trust
- Founded: 1991; 35 years ago
- Headquarters: 25 Bank Street, Canary Wharf, London, England
- Key people: Aidan Lisser (Chairman)

JPMorgan Emerging Markets Growth & Income (LSE: JMGI) is a large British investment trust dedicated to investments in emerging markets. Established in 1991, the company is a constituent of the FTSE 250 Index. The chairman is Aidan Lisser.

== History ==
The company was established as the Fleming Emerging Markets Investment Trust under the management of Robert Fleming & Co. in 1991. After Robert Fleming & Co. was acquired by Chase Manhattan in April 2000, and Chase Manhattan merged with J.P. Morgan & Co. in December 2000, it was brought under the management of J.P. Morgan & Co. It became the JP Morgan Fleming Emerging Markets Investment Trust in 2002 and then, following JPMorgan's decision to drop the Fleming brand, adopted the name JPMorgan Emerging Markets Investment Trust in 2005. It changed its name to JPMorgan Emerging Markets Growth & Income in November 2025.
