= RTW Biotech Opportunities =

British investment trust

- Traded as: LSE: RTW; FTSE 250 component
- Industry: Investment trust
- Founded: 2019; 6 years ago
- Headquarters: London, United Kingdom
- Website: www.rtwfunds.com/rtw-biotech-opportunities-ltd/

RTW Biotech Opportunities is a large British investment trust focused on investments in the biotechnology industry. The company is listed on the London Stock Exchange and is a constituent of the FTSE 250 Index.

== History ==
Established in 2019, the company invests in companies at all stages of development from the early stages of testing to full production of pharmaceuticals. Work by the administration of President Donald Trump to reach agreement with pharmaceutical companies over drug prices and tariffs, together with renewed mergers & acquisitions activity in the sector, led to renewed interest in the sector, and the company in particular, in the second half of 2025. The company is managed by RTW Investments and the chairman is William Simpson.
