= Allianz Technology Trust =

British investment trust

Allianz Technology Trust plc
- Formerly: Finsbury Technology Trust plc (1995–2007); RCM Technology Trust plc (2007–2014)
- Type: Public company
- Traded as: LSE: ATT; FTSE 250 component
- Industry: Investment Management
- Founded: 18 October 1995; 30 years ago
- Area served: Worldwide
- Website: allianztechnologytrust.com

Allianz Technology Trust plc (LSE: ATT) is a large British investment trust dedicated to investments in technology companies. It is listed on the London Stock Exchange and it is a constituent of the FTSE 250 Index, an index of the larger companies on the London Stock Exchange.

== History ==
The company was established as Finsbury Technology Trust in 1995. After RCM (UK) Limited won the mandate, it became RCM Technology Trust in 2007. Following the acquisition of RCM (UK) Limited by Allianz Global Investors, it adopted its current name in 2014. Allianz Technology Trust was named Best Technology Trust by ADVFN for 2020. The chairman is Robert Jeens.
