= Schroder Oriental Income Fund =

British investment trust

- Company type: Public company
- Traded as: LSE: SOI; FTSE 250 constituent
- Industry: Investment
- Founded: 2005; 21 years ago
- Headquarters: London, United Kingdom
- Products: Investment fund
- Website: www.schroders.com/en-gb/uk/individual/funds-and-strategies/investment-trusts/schroder-oriental-income-fund-limited/

Schroder Oriental Income Fund (LSE: SOI) is a British investment trust that invests in businesses which derive a significant proportion of their revenues from the Asia Pacific region. Established in 2005, the company is listed on the London Stock Exchange and is a constituent of the FTSE 250 Index. The chairman is Peter Rigg and the fund is managed by Schroders.
