= Palatial Crest =

Building in Hong Kong

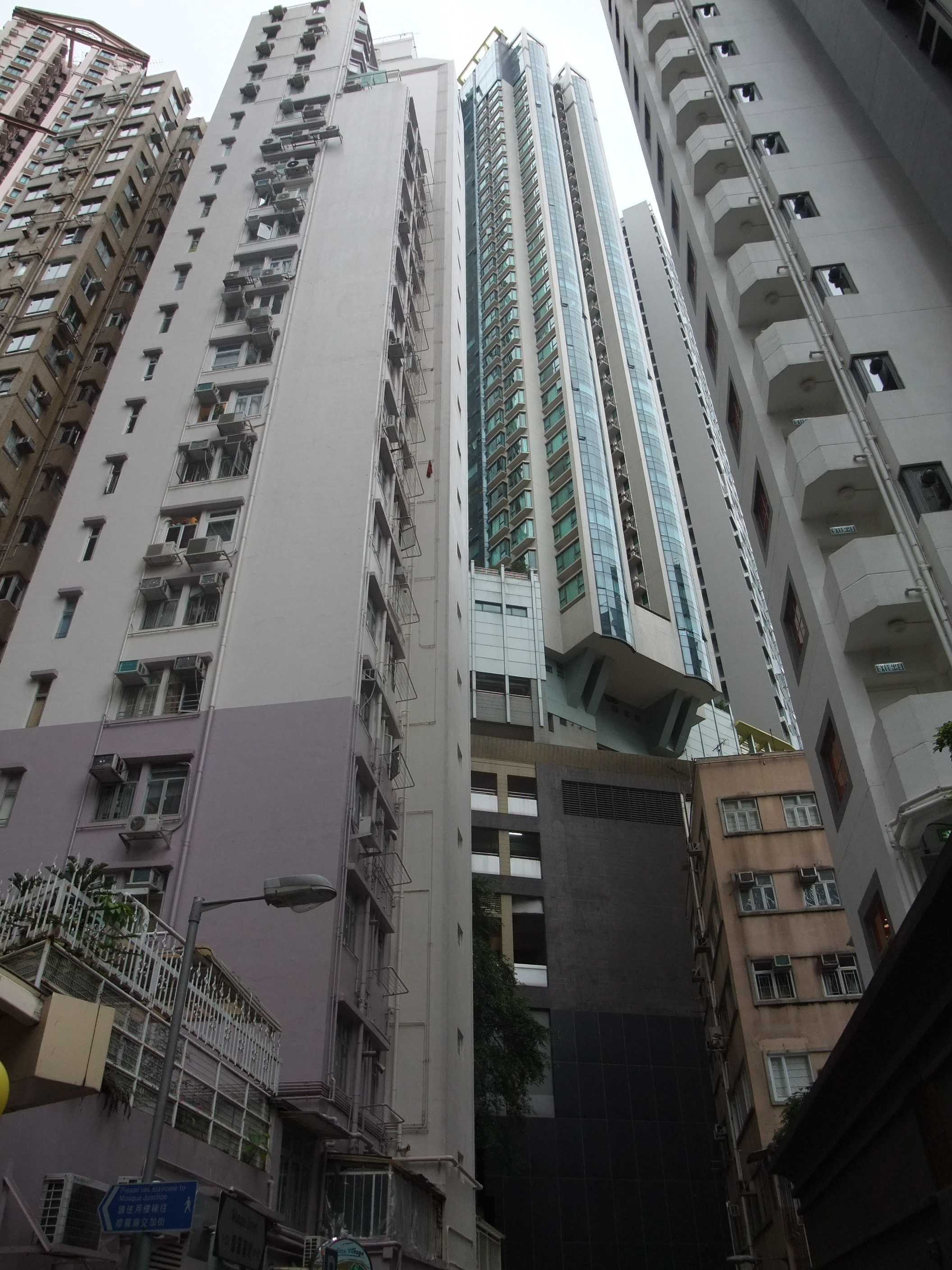
- Palatial Crest seen from Mosque Street (the building in center back).
- Interactive map of Palatial Crest

General information
- Location: 3 Seymour Road, Hong Kong
- Coordinates: 22.280643°N 114.150929°E
- Status: Good

Construction
- Constructed: 2000

Other information
- Governing body: Hang Yick Properties Management

Palatial Crest (Chinese: 輝煌豪園) is a building in Hong Kong built by Henderson Group and located at 3 Seymour Road in Hong Kong Mid-Levels West. It got the occupation permit in December 2000.

== Introduction ==
Palatial Crest is located in Hong Kong Mid-Levels West, near building Seymour. The residential has the infrastructure and plenty of leisure space, an area of 12,000 square feet club house. Club house has a swimming pool, children's leisure pool, Jacuzzi, sauna, steam room, fitness room, audio-visual room, children's play room, a ballroom, function room and multi-purpose playground. Total 192 units and 102 parking spaces. Managed by Hang Yick Properties Management Limited, the majority of the unit's area are about 973-1175 square feet, with 3 bedrooms and 3 bathrooms. The ceiling of the unit is extra high, approximately 10'-4 ". The top-floor penthouse are three to four bedrooms and two halls design. Each unit of the living room and master suite with floor to ceiling windows design.
