= North American Income Trust =

British investment trust

- Type: Public limited company
- Traded as: LSE: NAIT
- Industry: Investment Management
- Founded: 1902
- Headquarters: London, United Kingdom
- Key people: Patrick Edwardson (chair); Jeremiah Buckley and Fran Radano (managers)
- Website: www.janushenderson.com/en-gb/uk-investment-trusts/trust/the-north-american-income-trust-plc/

The North American Income Trust (LSE: NAIT), is a large British investment trust focused on investments in North America. The company is listed on the London Stock Exchange and is a constituent of the FTSE 250 Index.

== History ==
The company was established as the American Trust in 1902 and changed its name to the Edinburgh US Tracker Trust in June 1997. It adopted its current name in May 2012. The board changed its investment managers from Aberdeen Group to Janus Henderson in May 2024. As of April 2026, the trust's main focus was the financial and healthcare sectors: its technology exposure was just 10%.

It is managed by Jeremiah Buckley and Fran Radano of Janus Henderson and the chair is Patrick Edwardson.
