= Patria Private Equity Trust =

British investment company

- Company type: Public
- Traded as: LSE: PPET; FTSE 250 component
- Industry: Investment trust
- Founded: 2001; 24 years ago
- Headquarters: London, United Kingdom
- Key people: Alan Devine (chairperson)
- Website: patriaprivateequitytrust.com

Patria Private Equity Trust is a British investment trust dedicated to investments in private equity funds and direct investments into private companies with a European focus. Established in 2001, the company is listed on the London Stock Exchange and is a constituent of the FTSE 250 Index, an index of the larger companies on the London Stock Exchange. The chairperson is Alan Devine: he is due to be succeeded by Duncan Budge in March 2026. It is managed by Patria Capital Partners LLP.

== History ==
The company was launched as Standard Life European Private Equity Trust in 2001. It was known as Standard Life Private Equity Trust (SLPE) from 2017 and as abrdn Private Equity Opportunities Trust (APEO) from 2022. It then adopted its current name, Patria Private Equity Trust plc, in 2024 following the acquisition of the abrdn Private Equity business by Patria Investments Limited.
