= Aberforth Smaller Companies Trust =

British investment trust

Aberforth Smaller Companies Trust plc
- Type: Public
- Traded as: LSE: ASL; FTSE 250 Component
- Industry: Investment trust
- Founded: 30 July 1990; 36 years ago
- Website: Official Webpage

Previous Logo

Aberforth Smaller Companies Trust plc is a large British investment trust dedicated to investments in smaller companies, managed by Aberforth Partners LLP. The company is listed on the London Stock Exchange and is a constituent of the FTSE 250 Index.

== History ==
Established on 10 December 1990, the company is managed by a team from Aberforth Unit Trust Managers who specialise in smaller companies funds. The chairman is Richard Davidson.

In January 2026, analysts at Kepler noted that the company's shares were trading at a 10% discount to net asset value. They attributed the company's good performance to the high level of mergers and acquisitions among small companies. The company has also had a consistent programme of share buybacks. As of 30 September 2026, the company managed assets of approximately £1.5 billion.

== See also ==
- Aberforth Split Level Income Trust
