= Aberdeen Diversified Income and Growth Trust =

British investment trust

- Formerly: British Assets Trust plc (1898–2015); BlackRock Income Strategies Trust plc (2015–2017); Aberdeen Diversified Income and Growth Trust plc (2017–2023)
- Type: Public
- Traded as: LSE: ADIG
- Industry: Investment trust
- Founded: January 5, 1898; 128 years ago
- Headquarters: Edinburgh, Scotland, United Kingdom
- Key people: Trevor Bradley (Chair)
- Products: Multi-asset investments
- Total assets: £205.46 million (2024)
- Owner: Aberdeen Group
- Website: www.aberdeeninvestments.com/en-gb/adig

The Aberdeen Diversified Income and Growth Trust was an investment trust based in Edinburgh. It was listed on the London Stock Exchange but entered a managed wind-down in early 2024 and was eventually delisted in October 2026.

== History ==
The company was founded by accountants James Ivory and Thomas Watson Sime, of the asset management firm Ivory and Sime, as the British Assets Trust in 1898. After the mandate moved to BlackRock in February 2015, the company changed its name from British Assets Trust to BlackRock Income Strategies Investment Trust in April 2015. Then, after the mandate moved to Aberdeen Asset Management, the company merged with Aberdeen UK Tracker Trust and was renamed Aberdeen Diversified Income and Growth Trust in December 2016.

The company entered a managed wind-down in early 2024 and was eventually delisted in October 2026.
