= Capital Gearing Trust =

British investment trust

- Type: Public Limited Company
- Traded as: LSE: CGT constituent of the FTSE 250 Index
- Industry: Investment trust
- Founded: 1963; 63 years ago
- Headquarters: London, United Kingdom
- Key people: Jean Matterson (Chairman)
- Products: Investments
- Website: capitalgearingtrust.com

Capital Gearing Trust is a large British investment trust which invests in a broad range of equities, bonds, commodities and cash. It is listed on the London Stock Exchange and is a constituent of the FTSE 250 Index.

== History ==
The company was established under the chairmanship of Major George William Cecil Harding in Belfast in 1963. It was first listed on the London Stock Exchange in 1973. It has been managed since 1982 by Peter Spiller of Capital Gearing Asset Management, which is an employee ownership trust. The chairman is Jean Matterson.
