= Partners Group Private Equity =

British investment trust

- Company type: Public
- Traded as: LSE: PEY; FTSE 250 component
- Founded: 2007; 18 years ago
- Headquarters: Saint Peter Port, Guernsey
- Key people: Peter McKellar (chair)
- Website: www.partnersgroupprivateequitylimited.com

Partners Group Private Equity (LSE: PEY), is a large British investment trust focused on private equity direct investments. The company is listed on the London Stock Exchange and is a constituent of the FTSE 250 Index.

== History ==
Established as Princess Private Equity in 2007, the company's significant investments included a Swiss vacuum valves manufacturer, the VAT Group, a British software business, Civica, and an intellectual property business, CPA Global.

The company halted all new investment activity in August 2002 and then cancelled its dividend in November 2022, because of challenging debt markets, in which it was difficult to liquidate investments. It changed its name from Princess Private Equity to Partners Group Private Equity in March 2024.

The company is managed by Partners Group and the chairman is Peter McKellar.
