= Bankers Investment Trust =

British investment trust

- Type: Public company
- Traded as: LSE: BNKR; FTSE 250 component
- Industry: Investment Management
- Founded: 1888; 138 years ago in London, UK
- Headquarters: London, United Kingdom
- Area served: Worldwide
- Key people: Simon Miller (Chair); Alex Crooke and Richard Clode (Investment Managers)
- AUM: £1.5 Billion (31 December 2025)
- Website: Official site

Bankers Investment Trust is a large British investment trust dedicated to investments in major international businesses, particularly FTSE 100 companies. The company is a constituent of the FTSE 250 Index.

== History ==
The company was incorporated in 1888. Seven of the directors at that time were bankers, so it was named Bankers Investment Trust. Following financial difficulties in the Australian banking sector, it was unable to pay dividends in 1892 and 1893. It was first listed on the London Stock Exchange in 1957.

== Investment activity ==
The company is managed by Alex Crooke and Richard Clode of Janus Henderson, and the chairman is Simon Miller who was appointed in February 2022.
