= Seraphim Space Investment Trust =

British investment trust

- Type: Public limited company
- Traded as: LSE: SSIT
- Industry: Investment Management
- Founded: 2021
- Headquarters: London, United Kingdom,
- Key people: William Whitehorn (Chair)
- Website: investors.seraphim.vc

Seraphim Space Investment Trust (LSE: SSIT), is a large British investment trust focused on investments in space technology. The company is listed on the London Stock Exchange and is a constituent of the FTSE 250 Index.

== History ==
The company was launched through an initial public offering in July 2021. By April 2026, it had invested in 45 companies, mainly focused on satellite monitoring and communications.

The company confirmed in June 2026 that it had decided not to invest in the SpaceX listing and would instead continue its focus on satellite monitoring and communications. Later that month, the company announced that was investing in the latest fund-raising round by the Finnish satellite business, ICEYE.
