= JPMorgan Global Growth & Income =

British investment trust

JPMorgan Global Growth & Income plc
- Type: Public company
- Traded as: LSE: JGGI; FTSE 250 Index component
- ISIN: GB00BYMKY695
- Industry: Investment trust
- Founded: 1887; 139 years ago
- Headquarters: 25 Bank Street, Canary Wharf, London, England
- Key people: James Macpherson (Chairman)

JPMorgan Global Growth & Income is a large British investment trust. Established in 1887, it is dedicated to investing in companies worldwide. The Chairman is James Macpherson. It is listed on the London Stock Exchange and FTSE Russell announced on August 1, 2022, that it would become a constituent of the FTSE 250 Index on 4 August 2022.

== History ==
The company was established as the United British Securities Trust in April 1887. Following the appointment of Robert Fleming & Co. was as manager, it became the Fleming Overseas Investment Trust in 1982. After Robert Fleming & Co. was acquired by Chase Manhattan in April 2000, and Chase Manhattan merged with J.P. Morgan & Co. in December 2000, it was brought under the management of J.P. Morgan & Co. It went on to be the JPMorgan Fleming Overseas Investment Trust in 2002, and then, following JPMorgan's decision to drop the Fleming brand, became the JP Morgan Overseas Investment Trust in 2006 before adopting its current name in 2016.

In October 2021, Scottish Investment Trust completed a strategic review and proposed a combination of assets with JPMorgan Global Growth & Income. Shareholders were warned that the transaction would take some time to resolve, and the transaction was eventually completed in September 2022.

In May 2025, the company entered into a business combination with Henderson International Income Trust (a process under which the latter's shares were cancelled).
