= BlackRock Smaller Companies Trust =

British investment trust

BlackRock Smaller Companies Trust plc
- Traded as: LSE: BRSC; FTSE 250 component
- Industry: Investment trust
- Founded: 1906; 120 years ago
- Headquarters: London, United Kingdom
- Website: Official Site

BlackRock Smaller Companies Trust is a large British investment trust that invests in smaller companies. The chairman is Ronald Gould.

== History ==
The company was established as the North British Canadian Investment Company in 1906, and was renamed the NB Smaller Companies Trust in December 1993 and the 3i Smaller Companies Trust in December 1995. After Merrill secured the investment management mandate, it became the Merrill Lynch British Smaller Companies Trust in February 2005. Following the merger of Merrill Lynch Investment Management with BlackRock in February 2006, it adopted the current name in April 2008.

In February 2026, BlackRock announced that BlackRock Throgmorton Trust would merge with BlackRock Smaller Companies Trust. This would be achieved by the transfer of assets from BlackRock Throgmorton Trust and the subsequent winding up of that company.

== See also ==
- BlackRock Greater Europe Investment Trust
- BlackRock Throgmorton Trust
- BlackRock World Mining Trust
