= Schiehallion Fund =

Publicly traded investment trust

The Schiehallion Fund
- Company type: Public
- Traded as: LSE: MNTN; FTSE 250 component
- Industry: Investment management
- Founded: 1999
- Headquarters: Guernsey
- Key people: Linda Yueh (chair)
- Website: www.bailliegifford.com/en/uk/individual-investors/funds/schiehallion-fund/

The Schiehallion Fund Limited is a publicly traded investment trust which invests in later-stage private businesses. The Trust is managed by Baillie Gifford & Co Limited, the Edinburgh-based investment management partnership. It is listed on the London Stock Exchange and is a constituent of the FTSE 250 Index.

== History ==
The company was launched on the specialist fund segment of the London Stock Exchange in March 2019. It was transferred to the main market, to give shareholders greater liquidity, in January 2026. As of early 2026, the fund had taken significant investments in the American business, SpaceX, and the Italian technology business, Bending Spoons.

The company is named after Schiehallion, the mountain in Scotland. The chair is Linda Yueh.
