= Fidelity Special Values =

British investment trust

- Company type: Public company
- Traded as: LSE: FSV; FTSE 250 component
- Industry: Investment
- Founded: 1994; 32 years ago
- Headquarters: London, United Kingdom
- Website: investment-trusts.fidelity.co.uk/fidelity-special-values/

Fidelity Special Values is an actively managed contrarian British investment trust that aims to achieve long-term capital growth predominantly through investments in UK-listed companies. Established in 1994, the company is a constituent of the FTSE 250 Index. The chairman is Andy Irvine. The fund is managed by Fidelity International.
