= BlackRock World Mining Trust =

British investment trust

- Traded as: LSE: BRWM; FTSE 250 component
- Industry: Investment trust
- Founded: 1993; 33 years ago
- Headquarters: London, United Kingdom
- Website: Official site

BlackRock World Mining Trust is a British investment trust that invests in equity securities of mining and metals companies. The chairman is Charles Goodyear.

== History ==
The company was established by Mercury Asset Management as the Mercury World Mining Trust in October 1993. After Mercury was acquired by Merrill in 1997, it became the Merrill Lynch World Mining Trust in December 2000. Following the merger of Merrill Lynch Investment Management with BlackRock in February 2006, it adopted the current name in April 2008.

== See also ==
- BlackRock Smaller Companies Trust
- BlackRock Greater Europe Investment Trust
- BlackRock Throgmorton Trust
