= JPMorgan Claverhouse Investment Trust =

British investment trust

- Type: Public company
- Traded as: LSE: JCH; FTSE 250 Index component
- ISIN: GB0003422184
- Industry: Investment trust
- Founded: 1963; 63 years ago
- Headquarters: 25 Bank Street, Canary Wharf, London, England
- Key people: Victoria Stewart (Chair)

JPMorgan Claverhouse Investment Trust (LSE: JCH), is a large British investment trust focused on UK equity investments. The company is listed on the London Stock Exchange and is a constituent of the FTSE 250 Index. The chair is Victoria Stewart.

== History ==
The company was established by Robert Fleming & Co., which was based in Dundee, as the Claverhouse Investment Trust in March 1963. It was named in honour of the Dundee-born soldier, John Graham of Claverhouse, 1st Viscount Dundee who was killed at the Battle of Killiecrankie during the Jacobite rising of 1689. On account of the continuing role of Robert Fleming & Co. as manager, the trust became the Fleming Claverhouse Investment Trust in 1983. After Robert Fleming & Co. was acquired by Chase Manhattan in April 2000, and Chase Manhattan merged with J.P. Morgan & Co. in December 2000, it was brought under the management of J.P. Morgan & Co. It went on to be the JPMorgan Fleming Claverhouse Investment Trust in April 2003 and then, following JPMorgan's decision to drop the Fleming brand, adopted its current name in April 2007.
