= Law Debenture =

British investment trust

The Law Debenture Corporation plc
- Company type: Public company
- Traded as: LSE: LWDB; FTSE 250 component
- Industry: Financial services
- Founded: 1889
- Headquarters: London, United Kingdom
- Key people: Robert Hingley (Chair, official)
- Revenue: ▲£111.0 million (2025)
- Operating income: ▲£54.2 million (2025)
- Net income: ▲£49.5 million (2025)
- Website: lawdebenture.com

The Law Debenture Corporation plc is a British-based investment trust dedicated to a diversified range of investments. It also provides a range of fiduciary services including appointment of agents, directors and trustees for pension funds, trusts and companies. It is listed on the London Stock Exchange and is a constituent of the FTSE 250 Index.

== History ==
The company was first established in 1889, by Stanley Boulter, who remained chairman until his death in 1917. In 2007 it acquired Delaware Corporate Services Inc., a provider of legal and corporate services, and Safecall Limited, a provider of whistle-blowing services.

== Operations ==
The company has operations organised as follows:

- Investment Trust
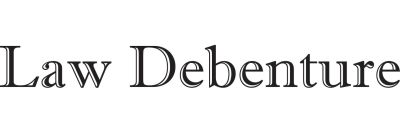
- Previous logo
  Provision of independent professional services
