= Aberdeen Asia Focus =

British investment trust

- Company type: Public company
- Traded as: LSE: AAS
- Industry: Investment management
- Founded: 1995
- Headquarters: London, England
- Key people: Krishna Shanmuganathan (chair)
- Website: www.aberdeeninvestments.com/en-gb/aas

Aberdeen Asia Focus plc (LSE: AAS), is a large British investment trust focused on investments in smaller quoted companies across Asia. The company is listed on the London Stock Exchange and is a constituent of the FTSE 250 Index.

== History ==
The company was established by a manager based in Singapore, Hugh Young, as part of a strategic push towards investments in the Asia Pacific Region in the early-1990s. It was launched as Abtrust Asian Smaller Companies Investment Trust in September 1995, changed its name to Aberdeen Asian Smaller Companies Investment Trust in December 1997 and then changed it again to Abrdn Asian Smaller Companies Investment Trust in November 2018. It adopted the name, Abrdn Asia Focus, in April 2022.

In November 2021, the company removed the restriction, which had limited the market capitalisation of companies in which invested to US$1.5 billion. The change was intended to encourage investment in a broader range of companies, especially in the growing economy of China.

Young stepped down in December 2023 and was replaced by Flavia Cheong. However, in May 2025, the company announced that Cheong would retire and would be replaced by Pruksa Iamthongthong in December 2025.

It is managed by Aberdeen Group and the chair is Krishna Shanmuganathan who took over that role in 2022. It changed its name again to Aberdeen Asia Focus in October 2025.
