= Supermarket Income REIT =

Property Holding in London

- Type: Public limited company
- Traded as: LSE: SUPR
- Industry: Property investment
- Founded: 2017; 9 years ago
- Headquarters: London, United Kingdom
- Key people: Nick Hewson (chairman)
- Revenue: ▲£101.1 million (2026)
- Operating income: ▲£118.0 million (2026)
- Net income: ▲£85.9 million (2026)
- Website: www.supermarketincomereit.com

Supermarket Income REIT is a British property investment company which invests in retail property and holds a large portfolio of supermarket buildings. It is structured as a real estate investment trust (REIT) that is listed on the London Stock Exchange and is a constituent of the FTSE 250 Index.

== History ==
The company was launched on the London Stock Exchange in July 2017 and used the proceeds to purchase a series of supermarkets with the main supermarket chains as its tenants. The company, together with its joint venture partner, British Airways Pension Trustees, acquired British Land's 25.5% stake in a portfolio of supermarkets in May 2020. It went on to buy a large supermarket in Newmarket in July 2020, a large supermarket in Bracknell in September 2020 two supermarkets, one in Melksham and one in Winchester in January 2021, five supermarkets in the northwest of England in September 2021, a supermarket in Cannock in December 2021 and a supermarket in Cwmbran in January 2022.

Sainsbury's exercised its option to acquire thirteen stores, which it occupied, from the company and its joint venture partner, British Airways Pension Trustees, in September 2021 and then bought a further eight stores, which it occupied, from the company and its joint venture partner in January 2022. The company raised an additional £175 million to buy supermarkets in April 2022.

By April 2022, the company had raised funds nine times for the purposes of building its portfolio of supermarkets; by that time the company owned 41 supermarkets directly and partially owned another 26 supermarkets through its joint venture with British Airways Pension Trustees.

In December 2025, it was announced the company had acquired three UK supermarket properties for £97.6 million as part of an expansion of its grocery-focused portfolio. The acquisition comprised stores operated by Tesco, Sainsbury's and Waitrose, all of which are let on long-term, inflation-linked leases.

== Operations ==
The company specialises in supermarkets. Its portfolio was valued at £1.4 billion as at 30 June 2025. The company is advised in all aspects of its work by Atrato Capital. The company is one of a small number of UK Real Estate Investment Trusts which have been launched in the UK and the only one specialising in supermarkets. The UK market is much less developed than that in the US; analysts at S&P Global Ratings have suggested that the UK REIT market "needs to grow a lot bigger" and involve "greater specialization".
