= AEP Plantations =

Far eastern plantations business

AEP Plantations plc
- Company type: Public
- Traded as: LSE: AEP
- Industry: Food
- Founded: 1985
- Headquarters: London, England
- Key people: Jonathan Law Ngee Song, Chair; Kevin Wong, CEO
- Products: Palm oil Palm kernels
- Revenue: ▲£465.2 million (2025)
- Operating income: ▲£111.6 million (2025)
- Net income: ▲£86.3 million (2025)
- Website: www.angloeastern.co.uk

AEP Plantations plc is a business operating palm oil plantations in Indonesia and Malaysia. It is listed on the London Stock Exchange and is a constituent of the FTSE 250 Index.

== History ==
The company was formed to consolidate a series of palm oil plantations in 1985. These included part of the Tasik Estate in the South Labuhanbatu Regency in North Sumatra, a province of Indonesia.

In May 1989, Chillington Corporation took a 52.2% shareholding in the company. After the company's previous majority shareholder got into financial difficulties, Genton International acquired a controlling holding in the company in October 1993.

In August 2024, the company invested in a large compressed natural gas plant at the Tasik Raja Palm Oil Mill in the South Labuhanbatu Regency.

The company changed its name to AEP Plantations in November 2025.

== Operations ==
As of November 2024, the company operated 121,655 hectares (300,620 acres) of plantations in Indonesia and 65,881 hectares (162,800 acres) of plantations in Malaysia.

== Major shareholder ==
As of September 2025, through Genton International, the estate of Lim Siew Kim owned about 51% of the company. Lim Siew Kim (died 2022) was the daughter of Lim Goh Tong (died 2007), who founded the Genting Group.
