= Helios Towers =

London-based telecommunications tower company

- Company type: Public
- Traded as: LSE: HTWS; FTSE 250 component
- Industry: Telecommunications
- Founded: 2009
- Headquarters: London, UK
- Key people: Samuel Jonah, KBE Chairman; Tom Greenwood, CEO
- Revenue: ▲$854.1 million (2025)
- Operating income: ▲$286.0 million (2025)
- Net income: ▲$39.4 million (2025)
- Website: www.heliostowers.com/

Helios Towers is a UK-based telecommunications tower company. It is listed on the London Stock Exchange and is a constituent of the FTSE 250 Index.

== History ==
The company was established in Mauritius with financial backing from George Soros, Millicom and Bharti Airtel in 2009. After an aborted attempt at launching a public issue in 2018, it was the subject of an initial public offering on the London Stock Exchange in 2019.

== Operations ==
The company owns more than 10,500 mobile communications towers located in Tanzania, Democratic Republic of the Congo, Ghana, Congo Brazzaville, South Africa, Senegal, Madagascar and Malawi.
