= Bytes Technology Group =

British company

- Type: Public limited company
- Traded as: LSE: BYIT; FTSE 250 component
- Industry: Reseller of computer software
- Founded: 1982; 44 years ago
- Headquarters: Leatherhead, Surrey, England.
- Key people: Gavin Rochussen (Chairman); Sam Mudd (Chief Executive Officer)
- Revenue: ▲£220.6 million (2026)
- Operating income: ▼£62.7 million (2026)
- Net income: ▼£51.3 million (2026)
- Website: www.bytesplc.com

Bytes Technology Group is a reseller of computer software in Leatherhead, Surrey, England. It is listed on the London Stock Exchange and is a constituent of the FTSE 250 Index.

== History ==
The business was established in a shop in Epsom in 1982. It was acquired by Allied Electronics Corporation (Altron), a company led by the entrepreneur, Bill Venter, in 1998.

In 2011, Bytes acquired Security Partnerships, a Reading-based cybersecurity specialist. The acquisition expanded the group's capabilities in information security, managed services and risk management.

In 2014, Bytes sold its document solutions subsidiary, Bytes Document Solutions, as part of a strategy to focus on software licensing, cloud computing, cybersecurity and IT services.

In 2017, Bytes acquired Blenheim Group, the parent company of Phoenix Software, a software licensing and IT services provider with a significant public-sector customer base. The acquisition expanded Bytes' presence in the public sector and strengthened its geographic coverage across the United Kingdom.

In December 2020, the company was demerged from Altron as part of an oversubscribed initial public offering on the London Stock Exchange; it also obtained a secondary inward listing on the Johannesburg Stock Exchange. The flotation valued the company at approximately £646.6 million and raised gross proceeds of approximately £352.4 million.

In February 2024, the CEO, Neil Murphy, resigned abruptly after the board became aware of some previously undisclosed trades in the company's shares.

In September 2026, Gavin Rochussen was appointed as chair in succession to Patrick De Smedt.

== Operations ==
Bytes Technology Group is a value-added reseller and information technology services provider operating in the United Kingdom and Ireland. The company provides software licensing, cloud computing, cybersecurity and artificial intelligence solutions, alongside consulting, implementation and managed services.

The group operates through two principal businesses: Bytes Software Services and Phoenix Software. Phoenix Software has historically maintained a strong focus on public-sector organisations including government, healthcare, education and charitable bodies, while Bytes Software Services serves commercial and enterprise customers.

The company has historically been closely associated with Microsoft technologies and was reported to be the largest reseller of Microsoft Azure cloud services in the United Kingdom during the year ended 30 June 2019.

In 2026, Bytes Technology Group adopted a more distinct operating structure, with Bytes Software Services focusing on private-sector customers and Phoenix Software focusing exclusively on public-sector organisations.
