= XPS Pensions =

British financial services business

- Type: Public
- Traded as: LSE: XPS
- Industry: Financial services
- Founded: 2009; 17 years ago
- Headquarters: Reading, England,
- Key people: Alan Bannatyne (Chairman); Paul Cuff (Co-CEO); Ben Bramhall (Co-CEO)
- Products: Pension consulting and administration
- Revenue: ▲£262.7 million (2026)
- Operating income: ▲£68.7 million (2026)
- Net income: ▼£26.6 million (2026)
- Website: www.xpsgroup.com

XPS Pensions is a British financial services business specialising in pensions consulting and administration. It is listed on the London Stock Exchange and is a constituent of the FTSE 250 Index.

== History ==
The company was established as a pensions consultancy and administration business within Equiniti in around 1990. It then adopted the brand name, Xafinity. It acquired a rival firm, Hazell Carr, in April 2008.

CBPE acquired the business from Equiniti in February 2013: it was then the subject of an initial public offering on the London Stock Exchange in February 2017.

It acquired another rival firm, Punter Southall & Co., in January 2018 and then changed its name to XPS Pensions in May 2018.

It went on to acquire the corporate pensions business of Royal London Group in May 2019 and to buy Trigon Professional Services in November 2019.
