= Invesco Global Equity Income Trust =

Investment trust

- Formerly: Invesco Perpetual Select Trust plc (2006–2021); Invesco Select Trust plc (2021–2024)
- Traded as: LSE: IGET
- Industry: Investment management
- Founded: 25 August 2006; 19 years ago
- Area served: Global
- Website: Official site

Invesco Global Equity Income Trust plc (LSE: IGET) is a British investment trust that aims to provide a predictable level of income together with long-term capital growth from a diversified global portfolio of equities. The shares are listed on the London Stock Exchange. The trust measures its performance primarily against the MSCI World Index Total Return benchmark.

== History ==
The company was incorporated in 2006 and previously operated under the names Invesco Perpetual Select Trust plc (2006–2021) and subsequently Invesco Select Trust plc (2021–2024) before adopting its current name.

The trust is managed by Invesco's Henley-based Global Equities team, led by Portfolio Manager Stephen Anness with Deputy Portfolio Manager Joe Dowling. As at 31 October 2025, the trust had total assets of approximately £261 million.

In November 2025, the trust agreed to merge with Franklin Global Trust plc, which is managed by Franklin Templeton, via a reconstruction scheme under the Insolvency Act 1986.

== See also ==
- Invesco Asia Dragon Trust
