= Paragon Banking Group =

British bank

Paragon Banking Group PLC
- Type: Public
- Traded as: LSE: PAG; FTSE 250 component
- Industry: Banking and Finance
- Founded: 1985
- Headquarters: Solihull, West Midlands, United Kingdom
- Key people: Robert East, Chairman; Nigel Terrington, CEO
- Revenue: ▼£1,249.0 million (2025)
- Operating income: ▲£256.5 million (2025)
- Net income: ▼£180.3 million (2025)
- Website: www.paragonbankinggroup.co.uk/

Paragon Banking Group PLC is one of the United Kingdom's largest providers of buy-to-let mortgages, and savings accounts. Based in Solihull, the company and offers lending to landlords and businesses and also offers savings accounts to consumers. It is also one of the UK's largest independent provider of mortgages to residential property investors in the UK Private Rented Sector. It is listed on the London Stock Exchange and is a constituent of the FTSE 250 Index.

== History ==
The company was established in 1985 as the National Home Loans Corporation. After growing rapidly in the late 1980s, the company got into serious financial difficulties during the early 1990s recession and nearly went bankrupt.

The company launched Homeloans Direct in 1995 and changed its name to the Paragon Group of Companies in 1997. In 2003 it acquired Britannic Money, which had been the lending arm of Britannic Assurance.

The company got into deep financial difficulty during the 2008 financial crisis when it had difficulty renewing a £280m credit facility which matured in February 2008. Having no deposit base at that time, unlike a commercial bank, it was forced to resort to a deeply discounted rights issue, raising upto £287 million, which was fully underwritten by UBS. It had to withdraw from the buy-to-let market and only returned to that market, supported by a £200m debt facility provided by Macquarie Bank, in September 2010.

In February 2014, the Paragon Group of Companies PLC launched Paragon Bank which offers a range of internet-based savings accounts and car finance. The move followed calls from the Competition Commission for more competition in the UK banking sector.

In September 2017, it changed its name to Paragon Banking Group PLC, as part of becoming a "fully integrated banking business", rather than an organisation focussed on the buy-to let market.

In July 2018, Paragon Banking Group completed a £48m takeover of residential lender, Titlestone Property Finance, which served small and medium-sized residential property developers. At that time it was also revealed that the company was significantly exposed to the payment protection insurance miss-selling scandal. It was disclosed in a court case that 76% of the insurance premium paid by one customer was actually an undisclosed commission to Paragon. The company subsequently confirmed that it would not appeal the court's ruling requiring it to pay compensation to the customer.

In June 2025, it was revealed that the company, along with Lloyds Banking Group, Santander UK, Close Brothers and Investec, was one of the banks most exposed to the motor finance scandal where banks failed to disclose discretionary commissions to customers. Paragon confirmed that it had set aside £6.5 million to deal with the scandal.

== Operations ==
The company is based in Solihull and offers lending to landlords and businesses and also offers savings accounts to consumers. It is also one of the UK's largest independent provider of mortgages to residential property investors in the UK Private Rented Sector.
