= Safestore =

British multinational self storage service

Safestore Holdings plc

- Storage unit in St Albans, UK
- Type: Public
- Traded as: LSE: SAFE; FTSE 250 component
- Industry: Storage
- Founded: 1998
- Headquarters: Borehamwood, Hertfordshire, UK
- Key people: David Hearn, (Chairman); Frederic Vecchioli, (CEO)
- Revenue: ▲£234.3 million (2025)
- Operating income: ▼£159.3 million (2025)
- Net income: ▼£111.1 million (2025)
- Website: www.safestore.co.uk

Safestore is the UK’s largest and Europe’s second largest provider of self-storage. It is listed on the London Stock Exchange and is a constituent of the FTSE 250 Index.

== History ==
Safestore was founded in the UK in 1998, and floated on the Alternative Investment Market (AIM) that year. In 2003, the company was delisted from the AIM after a Bridgepoint-backed £39.8 million Management Buyout led by Steve Williams (Chief Executive at the time).

In 2004, Safestore acquired Mentmore plc for £209 million who were trading under the ‘Spaces’ brand in the UK and as the ‘Une Pièce en Plus’ (UPEP) brand in France. The company has been listed on the London Stock Exchange since 2007. In April 2013, Safestore was converted into a real estate investment trust (REIT).

Safestore acquired Space Maker in July 2016 (adding 12 stores to the UK operation) and it completed the acquisition of Alligator Self Storage in November 2017.

Safestore acquired the Ready Steady store in Heathrow from Rockpool Investments in August 2019 and two stores joined the Safestore group in London through the acquisition of Fort Box Self Storage in November 2019.

Safestore also established a JV with Carlyle which acquired M3 Self Storage in the Netherlands (six stores in Amsterdam and Haarlem) in August 2019. Safestore also acquired Oh My Box Self storage (four stores in central Barcelona) in January 2020.

== See also ==
- Big Yellow Group
