= Bill Venter =

South African businessman, entrepreneur and industrialist

William Peter Venter (born 29 July 1934, in Johannesburg) is a South African businessman, entrepreneur and industrialist.

Venter founded Allied Electronics Corporation (Altron) in 1965. Acquisitions under his leadership included Bytes Technology Group in 1998 (following a demerger in December 2020, Bytes Technology Group became a listed entity its own right).

== Awards ==
- 2006 Top 100 Lifetime Achiever (Sunday Times Business Times)
- 1991 Order for Meritorious Service (Gold) (State President of South Africa) for significant contribution to South Africa’s electronics industry
- 1989 Leadership in Practice Award (University of South Africa SBL)
- 1984 Top Executive in South Africa (Management)
- 1978 Top Five Businessmen (Business Times)

== Degrees ==
- 2004 Master of Philosophy Rand Afrikaans University Business Management cum laude
- 2001 Master of Business Administration University of Wales

== Honorary degrees ==
- Doctor of Engineering University of the Witwatersrand
- Technical Doctorate Technikon Witwatersrand
- Doctor of Commerce University of the Free State
- Doctor of Commerce University of Pretoria
- Doctor of Commerce University of Port Elizabeth
- Doctor of Science (Engineering) University of Natal, Durban

== Personal life ==
He has four sons and a daughter. Two of his two sons, Robert and Craig, were from his first marriage to Jean Georgina Poole. In 1994, Edith, Venter's second wife and mother of two of his sons, was awarded a record R12-million divorce settlement. She was married for the third time in 1995 to Johannesburg businessman Garth Carstens.

- Robert Eben "Robbie" Venter, born 7 May 1960, is chairman of Aberdare Cables and Director of Bytes Technology Group Ltd., Allied Technologies Ltd (Altech), and Group chief executive of Allied Electronics Corp Ltd (Altron).
- Craig Gordon Venter was born 4 July 1962. He studied at University of California Los Angeles and obtained a BSc (Econ), a BA (Psychology) and an MBA and MSc (Management Science) from University of Southern California.
