= GCP Infrastructure Investments =

British investment trust

- Traded as: LSE: GCP; FTSE 250 component
- Industry: Investment trust
- Founded: 2010
- Headquarters: British
- Website: Official site

GCP Infrastructure Investments (Gravis Capital Partners) is a large British investment trust dedicated to investments in infrastructure. It is listed on the London Stock Exchange and is a constituent of the FTSE 250 Index. The Company's chairman is Andrew Didham and its investment adviser is Gravis Capital Management.

== History ==
The company was established in 2010. In August 2023, the company proposed a three-way merger with its sister fund GCP Asset Backed Income (GABI) and RM Infrastructure Income (RMII). Talks with RMII ended in early September 2023 because the two sides could not agree terms. The GABI combination was abandoned later that month after a significant minority of GABI shareholders opposed it.
