= XP Power =

Power control systems company

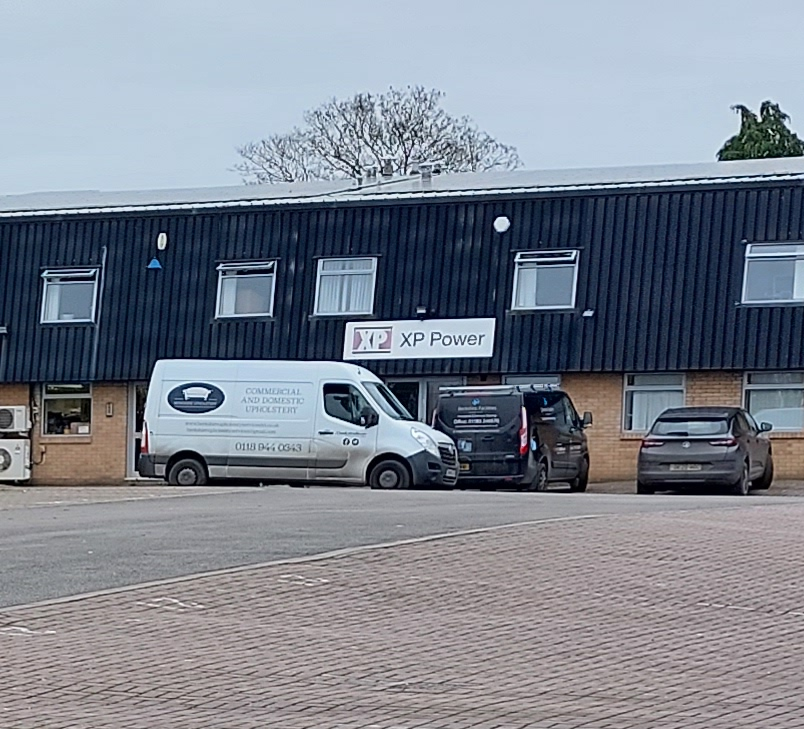
- Facility in Pangbourne, UK
- Type: Public limited company
- Traded as: LSE: XPP
- Industry: Critical power control systems
- Founded: 1988; 38 years ago
- Headquarters: Tai Seng, Singapore
- Key people: James Peters (chairman); Gavin Griggs (CEO)
- Revenue: ▼£230.1 million (2025)
- Operating income: ▼£17.3 million (2025)
- Net income: ▼£(11.3) million (2025)
- Website: www.xppowerplc.com

XP Power is a manufacturer and supplier of critical power control systems. It also handles the design, development and support of power control systems. It is listed on the London Stock Exchange and is a constituent of the FTSE 250 Index.

== History ==
The company was founded by James Peters in 1988. It was the subject of an initial public offer on the London Stock Exchange in 2000 and went on to acquire Emco, a US-based power supplies business, for $12 million in November 2015, and Comdel, another US-based power supplies business, for $23 million purchase in October 2017. It also bought Glassman, a US-based supplier of higher-voltage power supplies equipment, for £32 million in May 2018.

The company acquired FuG Elektronik GmbH, and Guth High Voltage GmbH in Germany for about €39 million in January 2022.

== Operations ==
The company has manufacturing facilities at Ho Chi Minh City in Vietnam and Ipoh in Malaysia.
