= Neuberger Private Equity Partners =

British investment company

- Type: Public
- Traded as: LSE: NBPE; FTSE 250 component
- Founded: 2007; 19 years ago
- Headquarters: Saint Peter Port, Guernsey
- Key people: William Maltby (chair)
- Website: www.nbprivateequitypartners.com

Neuberger Private Equity Partners, formerly NB Private Equity Partners, (LSE: NBPE) is a large British investment company dedicated to investments in unquoted companies in North America and Europe. The company is listed on the London Stock Exchange and is a constituent of the FTSE 250 Index. It is managed by Neuberger Berman and the chairman is William Maltby.

== History ==
The company was established as Lehman Brothers Private Equity Partners in 2007 and, following the management buyout of Neuberger Berman from Lehman Brothers in 2008, changed its name to NB Private Equity Partners later that year. It changed its name again to Neuberger Private Equity Partners in June 2026.
