= Hilton Food Group =

British food packaging business

- Type: Public
- Traded as: LSE: HFG; FTSE 250 component
- Industry: Food
- Founded: 1994; 32 years ago
- Headquarters: Huntingdon, United Kingdom
- Key people: Robert Watson (Chairman) Steve Murrells (CEO)
- Products: Meat packing
- Revenue: ▲£4,214.6 million (2025)
- Operating income: ▼£90.2 million (2025)
- Net income: ▲£47.5 million (2025)
- Website: hiltonfoods.com

Hilton Food Group plc is a British food packaging business that focuses on meat and other proteins. It is listed on the London Stock Exchange and is a constituent of the FTSE 250 Index.

== History ==
The company was established to operate a beef and lamb central meat packing facility in Huntingdon in 1994.

It was the subject of an initial public offering in May 2007 which valued the business at circa £105 million. It went on to acquire Seachill, a supplier of chilled and frozen salmon, in November 2017.

== Operations ==
Previous logo

The company has six factories and sells its products in supermarkets across fourteen countries in Europe. It also has a joint venture in Australia with Woolworths Group, a retail business, to undertaking meat processing activities for its stores and a joint venture in Portugal with Sonae Modelo Continente, another retail business, to provide packaged meats for its stores.
