= Worldwide Healthcare Trust =

British investment trust

- Type: Public
- Traded as: LSE: WWH; FTSE 250 component
- Industry: Investment management
- Founded: 1995
- Headquarters: London, United Kingdom
- Key people: William Hemmings(Chairman)
- Website: www.worldwidewh.com

Worldwide Healthcare Trust is a large British investment trust dedicated to investing in a portfolio of biotechnology and healthcare companies around the world. It is listed on the London Stock Exchange is a constituent of the FTSE 250 Index.

== History ==
The company was established as Finsbury Worldwide Pharmaceutical in 1995. It adopted its current name in July 2010. The former chairman, Doug McCutcheon, joined the board in 2012. At the Annual General Meeting in July 2024, concerns were raised about McCutcheon's independence on account of his long service with the company. Mr McCutcheon retired from the board in July 2026 when William Hemmings took over the role of chairman.
