= Ivory and Sime =

Ivory and Sime was an investment management company established in the late 19th century.

== History ==
The company was founded by two accountants, James Ivory and Thomas Watson Sime, in 1895. It took over the management of British Assets Trust when it was established in 1898. Other major investment trusts established by the company included Personal Assets Trust which was formed in 1983.

The company struggled to maintain its clients in the 1990s's and, in particular, lost the contract to manage the Merchant Navy Pension Fund in 1994 and the contract to manage the BAA Pension Fund in 1997. After senior staff started leaving, it was announced, in November 1997, that the business would be merged with the asset management arm of Friends Provident, the mutual life assurer, in a deal worth £132 million, thereby creating Friends Ivory & Sime. Following the transaction, Friends Provident owned 67% of the combined entity.

In 2002, Friends Ivory & Sime merged with Royal & Sun Alliance Investments and was rebranded as Isis Asset Management and, in 2004, the expanded business merged with F&C Asset Management and adopted the F&C brand.
