= Lancashire Holdings =

Bermuda-based insurance company

- Type: Public company
- Traded as: LSE: LRE; FTSE 250 component
- Industry: Insurance
- Founded: 2005; 21 years ago
- Headquarters: Hamilton, Bermuda
- Key people: Peter Clarke (Chairman); Alex Maloney (CEO)
- Products: Reinsurance
- Revenue: ▲$1,860.4 million (2025)
- Operating income: ▼$304.9 million (2025)
- Net income: ▼$293.4 million (2025)
- Website: www.lancashiregroup.com

Lancashire Holdings Limited is a Bermuda incorporated company with operating subsidiaries in Bermuda, London, the US, and Australia, and two syndicates at Lloyd’s of London. It is listed on the London Stock Exchange and is a constituent of the FTSE 250 Index.

== History ==
The company was initially launched on the Alternative Investment Market in November 2005. It secured a full listing on the London Stock Exchange in February 2009 and acquired Cathedral Capital in 2013, gaining access to the Lloyd's insurance market.

== Operations ==
The company is focussed on property, energy, marine and aviation insurance.
