= Sirius Real Estate =

Property investment company

- Type: Public limited company
- Traded as: JSE: SRE: LSE: SRE; FTSE 250 component
- Industry: Property
- Founded: 2007
- Headquarters: Berlin, Germany
- Key people: Daniel Kitchen (chairman); Andrew Coombs (CEO)
- Revenue: ▲€347.5 million (2026)
- Operating income: ▲€254.7 million (2026)
- Net income: ▲€229.8 million (2026)
- Subsidiaries: BizSpace Group; Sirius Facilities
- Website: sirius-real-estate.com

Sirius Real Estate is a property company investing in business parks in Germany and the United Kingdom. It is listed on the London Stock Exchange and is a constituent of the FTSE 250 Index.

== History ==
The company was established in February 2007, and was listed on the Alternative Investment Market in May 2007.

Andrew Coombs was appointed CEO in 2012.

In 2014, the company launched a listing on the Johannesburg Stock Exchange. The company had acquired 40 business parks in Germany by the time it transferred to the main market in March 2017.

In March 2019, the company entered into a joint venture to invest in business parks in Germany with AXA Investment Managers.

It was reported, in December 2025, that the CEO, Andrew Coombs, was significantly exposed to the company's performance having built up a 0.81% stake in the company worth £16 million. Another 51% was held by financial institutions.

In March 2026, after raising £77 million for defence investments in Germany, the company acquired an industrial estate in Germany let mainly to Rheinmetall for £93.6 million.

As of 2026, the company was targeting defence sector tenants but was avoiding data centres. The Times was critical of its operations stating that it was exposed to a "downturn that could hit its small business clients".

== Operations ==
The company's investment portfolio was self-valued at £3.0 billion as of 31 March 2026.
