= Mercantile Investment Trust =

British investment trust investing in medium and smaller companies in the UK

- Type: Public
- Traded as: LSE: MRC; FTSE 250 component
- Industry: activities of holding companies financial service activities, except insurance and pension funding
- Founded: 1884; 142 years ago
- Headquarters: London, United Kingdom
- Key people: Rachel Beagles (chair)
- Website: am.jpmorgan.com/gb/en/asset-management/per/products/the-mercantile-investment-trust-plc-gb00bf4jdh58

Mercantile Investment Trust (LSE: MRC) is a large British investment trust dedicated to investments in medium and smaller companies in the United Kingdom. It listed on the London Stock Exchange and it is a constituent of the FTSE 250 Index.

== History ==
The company was established as the Mercantile Investment Trust in 1884. Robert Fleming & Co. later won the mandate and it became the Fleming Mercantile Investment Trust in June 1982. After Robert Fleming & Co. was acquired by Chase Manhattan in April 2000, and Chase Manhattan merged with J.P. Morgan & Co. in December 2000, it was brought under the management of J.P. Morgan & Co. It became the JP Morgan Fleming Mercantile Investment Trust in June 2004. It then reverted to its original name in April 2008. The chair is Rachel Beagles.
