= Stanley Boulter =

British lawyer and businessman (1852–1917)

Stanley Carr Boulter (29 May 1852 – 5 January 1917) was a British lawyer and businessman, who established The Law Debenture Corporation. In 1902, he married Helen Carte, widow of Richard D'Oyly Carte, and he assisted in the financing of the Savoy hotel group.

== Education and career ==
Boulter was educated at Clare College, Cambridge before being called to the Bar in 1879. During his legal career, he was at one point editor of the Law Reports in The Times. As a barrister he concentrated on commercial and financial civil cases. Such criminal cases as he took were generally concerned with fraud and breaches of bankruptcy laws. From 1885 onwards he was sufficiently eminent to appear before the Court of Appeal.

In 1889, Boulter turned his energies to finance. He was one of the founders of the Law Debenture Corporation, of which he remained the chairman until his death. He was also chairman of the Imperial Colonial Finance and Agency Corporation, and the New Investment Company. The Times called him "one of the leading representatives of the great Trust Companies.... Nobody was better than Mr. Boulter at handling a difficult meeting of shareholders ... and restoring confidence."

In politics, Boulter began as a Liberal, but disagreed with his party leader, W. E. Gladstone, over Irish home rule. Boulter stood unsuccessfully as a "Liberal Unionist" in the general election of 1886, and his political views came to be aligned with those of the Conservative party, particularly on any matters affecting the integrity of the British Empire. In social politics he remained more liberal, advocating public assistance for working men to buy homes. In his later years, he was a Justice of the Peace for Surrey.

== Family ==
The son of John Boulter of Frimley, Surrey, Boulter first married Edith née Anderson. There were three sons and four daughters of the marriage. Edith died in 1896. In 1902, he married Helen Carte. Her first husband, Richard D'Oyly Carte, had built and operated both the Savoy Theatre and Savoy Hotel. Boulter used the Law Debenture Corporation to assist in raising funds for expansion of the hotel and was appointed vice-chairman of the Savoy hotel group. After his wife's death in 1913, he continued as vice-chairman and assisted the new chairman, her stepson Rupert D'Oyly Carte, with matters related to the D'Oyly Carte businesses.

Boulter died in London in 1917 at the age of 64.

== See also ==
- D'Oyly Carte Opera Company
- Gilbert and Sullivan
