= SDCL Efficiency Income Trust =

British energy investment company

- Type: Public
- Traded as: LSE: SEIT; FTSE 250 component
- Founded: 2018; 8 years ago
- Headquarters: London, United Kingdom
- Key people: Tony Roper (chair)
- Website: www.seitplc.com

SDCL Efficiency Income Trust (LSE: SEIT) is a large British investment company dedicated to investments in energy efficiency projects. It is listed on the London Stock Exchange, and is a constituent of the FTSE 250 Index.

== History ==
The company was established as SDCL Energy Efficiency Income Trust in December 2018. It changed its name from SDCL Energy Efficiency Income Trust to SDCL Efficiency Income Trust plc on 21 May 2025. The chairman is Tony Roper and it is managed by Sustainable Development Capital LLP ('SDCL').
