= Split capital investment trust =

A split capital investment trust (split) is a type of investment trust which issues different classes of share to give the investor a choice of shares to match their needs. Most splits have a limited life determined at launch known as the wind-up date. Typically the life of a split capital trust is five to ten years.

== Structure ==
Every split capital trust will have at least two classes of share:

In order of (typical) priority and increasing risk

- Zero Dividend Preference shares - no dividends, only capital growth at a pre-established redemption price (assuming sufficient assets)
- Income shares - entitled to most (or all) of the income generated from the assets of a trust until the wind-up date, with some capital protection
- Annuity Income shares - very high and rising yield, but virtually no capital protection
- Ordinary Income shares (aka Income & Residual Capital shares) - a high income and a share of the remaining assets of the trust after prior ranking shares
- Capital shares - entitled most (or all) of the remaining assets after prior ranking share classes have been paid; very high risk

The type of share invested in is ranked in a predetermined order of priority, which becomes important when the trust reaches its wind-up date. If the split has acquired any debt, debentures or loan stock, then this is paid out first, before any shareholders. Next in line to be repaid are Zero Dividend Preference shares, followed by any Income shares and then Capital. Although this order of priority is the most common way shares are paid out at the wind-up date, it may alter slightly from trust to trust.

Splits may also issue Packaged Units combining certain classes of share, usually reflecting the share classes in the trust usually in the same ratio. This makes them essentially the same investment as an ordinary share in a conventional Investment Trust.

== See also ==
- Closed-end fund
- Income trust
- Real estate investment trust
- Venture Capital Trust
- Investment company
