= Meridian Mining =

Mining company focussed on gold and copper deposits

- Type: Public
- Traded as: LSE: MNO
- Industry: Mining
- Founded: 2013; 13 years ago
- Headquarters: London, UK
- Key people: Bruce McLeod (chairman); Gilbert Clark (CEO)
- Revenue: $nil million (2025)
- Operating income: ▼$(18.2) million (2025)
- Net income: ▲$(17.0) million (2025)
- Website: meridianmining.co

Meridian Mining plc is a mining company focussed on gold and copper deposits in Brazil. It is listed on the London Stock Exchange and is a constituent of the FTSE 250 Index.

== History ==
The company was established as a mining business, focused on metals and mining, in late 2013.

The company first listed its shares on the TSX Venture Exchange in November 2016. Originally located in Amsterdam and registered in the Netherlands, it relocated to London and re-registered in England in 2017.

The company then acquired an interest in the Cabaçal mine near the Cabaçal River in Mato Grosso in Brazil in November 2020. (Note: The Cabaçal mine had originally been discovered by BP Minerals in 1983.)

It transferred the listing of its shares to the Toronto Stock Exchange in April 2022.

It then made further discoveries of gold and copper at Saint Helena, 10 kilometres (6.2 mi) southeast of the Cabaçal site, in September 2024.

The company submitted a request to the state authorities for a licence to start construction at its mines in Mato Grosso in May 2026. It also completed a placing of shares and secured a listing on the main market of the London Stock Exchange in May 2026.
