= CVS Group =

British veterinary services business

CVS Group plc
- Type: Public
- Traded as: LSE: CVSG
- Industry: Veterinary services
- Founded: 1999
- Headquarters: Diss, Norfolk, England
- Key people: David Wilton, Chair; Richard Fairman, CEO
- Revenue: ▲£712.8 million (2026)
- Operating income: ▼£47.6 million (2026)
- Net income: ▼£17.8 million (2026)
- Website: www.cvsukltd.co.uk

CVS Group plc is a British veterinary services business. It is listed on the London Stock Exchange and is a constituent of the FTSE 250 Index.

== History ==
In 1999, a group of individuals led by Bruce Robinson and Brian Pound took the initiative to form a veterinary services business with initial financing arranged by the venture capital group, Nash Sells.

Simon Innis joined the company as chief executive in January 2004 and led the company through much of its growth as it acquired small veterinary practices around the UK. The company was the subject of an initial public offering on the Alternative Investment Market in October 2007. The former finance director of the business, Richard Fairman, took over as CEO in November 2019.

After the Competition and Markets Authority expressed concerns, a proposed acquisition of a rival business, The Vet, was put on hold in February 2022. By 2024, CVS Group and five other companies owned 60% of all UK veterinary practices.

The company transferred from the Alternative Investment Market to the main market in January 2026.
