= 4imprint =

London-based direct marketer of promotional merchandise

4imprint Group plc
- Type: Public limited company
- Traded as: LSE: FOUR; FWB: IMW; FTSE 250 component
- Industry: Promotional products
- Founded: 1985; 41 years ago
- Headquarters: London, England, UK
- Key people: Paul Moody (chairman); Kevin Lyons-Tarr (CEO)
- Revenue: ▲$1,367.9 million (2024)
- Operating income: ▲$148.1 million (2024)
- Net income: ▲$117.2 million (2024)
- Website: www.4imprint.com

4imprint Group plc is a direct marketer of promotional merchandise based in London, England. It has offices in the United States, United Kingdom, and Europe. It is listed on the London Stock Exchange and is a constituent of the FTSE 250 Index (of largest companies listed on the London Stock Exchange). In both 2023 and 2024, it was ranked the largest distributor by revenue in its industry in North America.

== History ==
The company was founded by Dick Nelson as Nelson Marketing in Logansport, Indiana in 1985. It was acquired by Bemrose Corporation in 1996. In 2000, Bemrose Corporation exited the paper products business and changed its name to 4imprint Group plc. Its North America division was renamed 4imprint Inc.

In 2003, Hanover Investors, a private equity firm, purchased over 25% of 4imprint over the course of a month. They led a shareholder rebellion, and shareholders called for the removal of all non-executive directors after talks between 4imprint and Hanover Investors broke down.

4imprint established a distribution centre in Oshkosh, Wisconsin in 2009. In 2012, it sold Kreyer Promotion Service GmbH and Brand Addition Limited to European affiliate companies of H.I.G. Capital for £24 million.

In November 2024, the company was identified as one of the best performing shares on the London Stock Exchange over the last decade having achieved a 16% increase in share price since 2023, a 111% increase in share price since 2022, and a 2,342% increase in share price since 2011. However, the company expressed some caution about sales growth and said it would be slower in 2024 than in the previous year.

In October 2024, the company completed the expansion of its Oshkosh operations. The 170,000 expansion brought the total size of the facility to 475,000-square-foot. The development involved 1,488 new solar panels and brought the total on the building to some 4,000 panels. This was part of a programme to expand its North American headquarters in Oshkosh announced in 2015. The State of Wisconsin, through its Wisconsin Economic Development Corporation, may have supported the company with state tax credits, dependent upon the number of jobs that were actually created through the expansion. This large facility is home to some 50% of the total workforce.

== Operations ==
Although headquartered in London, 97% of 4imprint's business is in the United States and Canada. In both 2023 and 2024, it was ranked the largest distributor by revenue in promotional products industry in North America.

The company's UK operation is based at Cobra Court in Trafford Park, Manchester.
