= Big Yellow Group =

British self-storage company

Big Yellow Group plc

- Branch in Barking, London
- Formerly: Store Stuff Limited (August–September 1998); Cubic Self Storage Limited (1998–1999); The Big Yellow Holding Company Limited (1999–2000)
- Type: Public
- Traded as: LSE: BYG; FTSE 250 component
- ISIN: GB0002869419
- Industry: Storage
- Founded: 1998; 28 years ago
- Headquarters: Bagshot, England, UK
- Key people: Nicholas Vetch (Chairman); James Gibson (Chief executive officer)
- Revenue: ▲£209.1 million (2026)
- Operating income: ▼£138.1 million (2026)
- Net income: ▼£124.9 million (2026)
- Website: bigyellow.co.uk

Big Yellow Group plc is a self-storage company based in Bagshot, England. It is the largest self-storage company in the United Kingdom and is a constituent of the FTSE 250 Index and listed on the London Stock Exchange. Big Yellow has the highest brand awareness in the sector.

== History ==
Founded in 1998 by Nicholas Vetch, Philip Burks and James Gibson, the company has, as of 2021, 104 storage sites in the UK, 19 of which operate under the name Armadillo Self Storage. Philip Burks served as the property director of the company from 1998 to 2007.

In 2007, the company was converted into a real estate investment trust, and later that year entered into a partnership with funds managed by Pramerica Real Estates Investors to develop another 25 stores in the Midlands, the North of England and Scotland.

In November 2026, it was reported that investors Ancora Holdings and Irenic Capital Management were pushing for the business to be put up for sale after its assets lost nearly £300m in value.

=== Financials ===
Financials
Year	Revenue (£m)	Operating Income (£m)	Net Profit (£m)
2016	101.38	117.86	112.00
2017	109.07	109.02	99.51
2018	116.66	142.56	133.54
2019	125.41	135.56	126.50
2020	129.31	103.17	92.58
2021	135.24	270.77	265.19
2022	171.32	704.39	697.27
2023	188.83	90.14	73.33
2024	199.62	259.57	239.83
2025	204.50	215.03	201.89
2026	209.08	138.09	124.91

== See also ==
- Safestore
