= Invesco Asia Dragon Trust =

Investment trust

- Traded as: LSE: IAD; FTSE 250 component
- Industry: Investment Management
- Founded: 11 July 1995; 30 years ago
- Area served: Asia, Australasia, Far East
- Website: Official Site

Invesco Asia Dragon Trust plc (LSE: IAD) is a large British investment trust dedicated to investments in Far East companies. The company is listed on the London Stock Exchange and is a constituent of the FTSE 250 Index. The chairman is Neil Rogan.

== History ==
Invesco Asia Trust was established in 1995.

In October 2024, it was announced that Invesco Asia Trust would merge with Asia Dragon Trust to form the largest investment trust in the sector focussed on companies in the Far East. This would be achieved by a transfer of assets from Asia Dragon Trust to Invesco Asia Trust, followed by the voluntary liquidation of Asia Dragon Trust. The combined portfolio would then be held and would operate as Invesco Asia Dragon Trust. Asia Dragon Trust had been established as the EFM Dragon Trust in 1987: it changed its name to Edinburgh Dragon Trust in 1994 and to Asia Dragon Trust in November 2019.

Shareholders of Asia Dragon Trust approved the scheme on 13 February 2025, so allowing the transaction to be completed. Invesco Asia Dragon Trust was welcomed to the London Stock Exchange on 14 February 2025.

== See also ==
- Invesco Global Equity Income Trust
