= Fidelity Emerging Markets =

United Kingdom financial services company

- Type: Public company
- Traded as: LSE: FEML; FTSE 250 component
- Industry: Investment
- Founded: 1989; 37 years ago
- Headquarters: London, United Kingdom
- Website: investment-trusts.fidelity.co.uk/fidelity-emerging-markets-limited/

Fidelity Emerging Markets Ltd is a large Guernsey-incorporated, London-based closed-end investment fund focused predominantly on holdings in the stock markets of emerging economies. Established in July 1989, the company is a constituent of the FTSE 250 Index. Its chairman is Heather Manners. Following the appointment of Fidelity International as manager, the company changed its name from Genesis Emerging Markets Fund to Fidelity Emerging Markets on 1 October 2021.
