= Target Healthcare REIT =

British company

- Type: Public limited company
- Traded as: LSE: THRL
- Industry: Property investment
- Founded: 2013; 13 years ago
- Headquarters: London, United Kingdom
- Key people: Alison Fyfe (Non-Executive Chair); Kenneth MacKenzie (CEO)
- Revenue: ▼£60.2 million (2026)
- Operating income: ▲£49.1 million (2026)
- Net income: ▲£40.5 million (2026)
- Website: www.targethealthcarereit.co.uk

Target Healthcare REIT is a British property investment company which invests in healthcare properties and holds a large portfolio of care homes. It is structured as a real estate investment trust (REIT) and is listed on the London Stock Exchange and is a constituent of the FTSE 250 Index.

== History ==
The company was launched on the London Stock Exchange in March 2013 and used the proceeds to purchase as series of care homes with the main care home chains as its tenants.

The company bought a series of care homes individually: it acquired two care homes, one in Cirencester and one in Camberley in June 2018, one in Doncaster in July 2018, one in Wetherby in September 2018, and then two care homes, one in Ripon and one in Stourport-on-Severn in August 2019.

Target Healthcare went on to buy the portfolio of the Yorkshire based company, Darrington Healthcare, in December 2019, and then to acquire a large and diverse portfolio of 18 care homes in December 2021.

Investors Chronicle commented in March 2021 that the COVID-19 pandemic had put care home operators under considerable stain, thereby increasing the risk for landlords such as Target Healthcare REIT, but the roll-out of the COVID-19 vaccine was reducing the sector risk.

== Operations ==
The company specialises in healthcare. Its portfolio was valued at £0.8 billion as at 30 June 2026. The company reported, in May 2022, that it had accumulated a portfolio of 95 care homes. The company is one of a small number of UK Real Estate Investment Trusts which have been launched in the UK and the only one specialising in care homes. The UK market is much less developed than that in the US; analysts at S&P Global Ratings have suggested that the UK REIT market "needs to grow a lot bigger" and involve "greater specialization".
