= Global Charity Project =

Student organization at Marymount University

The Global Charity Project (GCP) is a student-run organization at Marymount University dedicated to raising funds for international and domestic sustainable development projects.

== Mission ==
The Global Charity Project's self-stated mission is to "bring together students of Marymount University to help build a sustainable future for people everywhere. It works to raise money and collect resources for the underprivileged while endeavoring to instill a sense of altruism and charity in the Marymount community. The GCP engages in assistance initiatives both domestically and internationally which focus on capacity building and self-help development."

The group maintains that every person has a personal responsibility to charitable to their neighbor whether they live next door or a thousand miles away.

== History ==
The Global Charity Project was founded in March 2008. It began with three socially conscious students and became an official university club with widespread student and administration support.

=== Kahama, Tanzania ===
It selected Our Lady, Queen of the Family Girl's Secondary School in Kahama, Tanzania as its first Assistance Initiative for the spring 2008 semester. In four weeks, the GCP raised $3,169.24 to purchase and cultivate a field and garden for the students of the school to address severe food shortages afflicting the area. The original fund-raising goal was $1,600.

=== Masongbo-loko, Sierra Leone ===
In September 2008, the GCP selected its second Assistance Initiative. It raised $4,123.77 throughout the fall semester to construct a well in Masongbo-loko, Sierra Leone. World Hope International, a non-profit based in Alexandria, Virginia, partnered with GCP to carry out the project.

=== Arlington, Virginia ===
The GCP selected the Arlington Youth Philanthropy Initiative as its first Secondary Project, also in fall 2008. The GCP partnered with the Arlington Community Foundation to increase youth philanthropy in Arlington County, Virginia through the creation of a grant-making body of Arlington high school students who will disburse grants to youth-initiated community betterment projects.

=== El Progreso, Honduras ===
In spring 2009, the GCP partnered with ProNino USA, a charitable non-profit dedicated to improving the lives of street children in Northern Honduras, to expand the capacity of the Las Flores detoxification facility and home for young boys in El Progreso, Honduras, while also making improvements to the building's infrastructure. The home takes in street children who suffer from chronic hunger, lack of education, addiction to drugs, and abuse. It provides the boys with a safe and stable environment where they have a steady supply of food and other basic necessities.

== Structure ==
The GCP is a chartered student organization at Marymount University. As such, it is required to maintain a constitution as approved by the Marymount University Co-Curricular Council. The Global Charity Project Constitution invests most of the organization's day-to-day decision-making authority in the Executive Council made up a co-president for Management (CPM), co-president for Initiatives (CPI), Vice President, Secretary, and Treasurer. These officers are elected at the end of the Spring semester. The members decide by majority vote which Assistance Initiatives or Secondary Projects to engage in for each semester.

== Initiatives ==
Two types of projects comprise the bulk of the Global Charity Project's work: the semesterly Assistance Initiatives and the Secondary Projects.

Assistance Initiatives are the main focus of the GCP. The GCP receives project proposals from outside groups or organizations and selects an Assistance Iniatiative to focus on each semester. Assistance Initiatives have two components: fundraising and awareness. Each Assistance Iniaitive has a fundraising goal and the members attempt to meet this by the end of the semester. At the same time, the group launches an education campaign to increase awareness about the problem being addressed by the Assistance Initiative. The Assistance Initiatives can be either domestic or international projects. Assistance Initiatives must meet strict criteria: they must be sustainable development projects, 100% of funds raised must go towards the actual Assistance Initiative, GCP and/or partner organization must be able to evaluate the effectiveness of the Assistance Initiatives, and all organizations with which GCP works must be transparent.

Secondary Projects are less narrow in scope and are not tied to the same strict criteria as Assistance Initiatives. They do not have to be centered on fundraising and can focus on community service, volunteering, or a variety of different issues. These projects can be worked on at the same time as Assistance Initiatives and may go longer than one semester.

== Legal status ==
The Global Charity Project has 501 (c) (3) status under Marymount University. Donations to the organization are tax exempt.
