= FTSE 250 Index =

British stock market index

FTSE 250

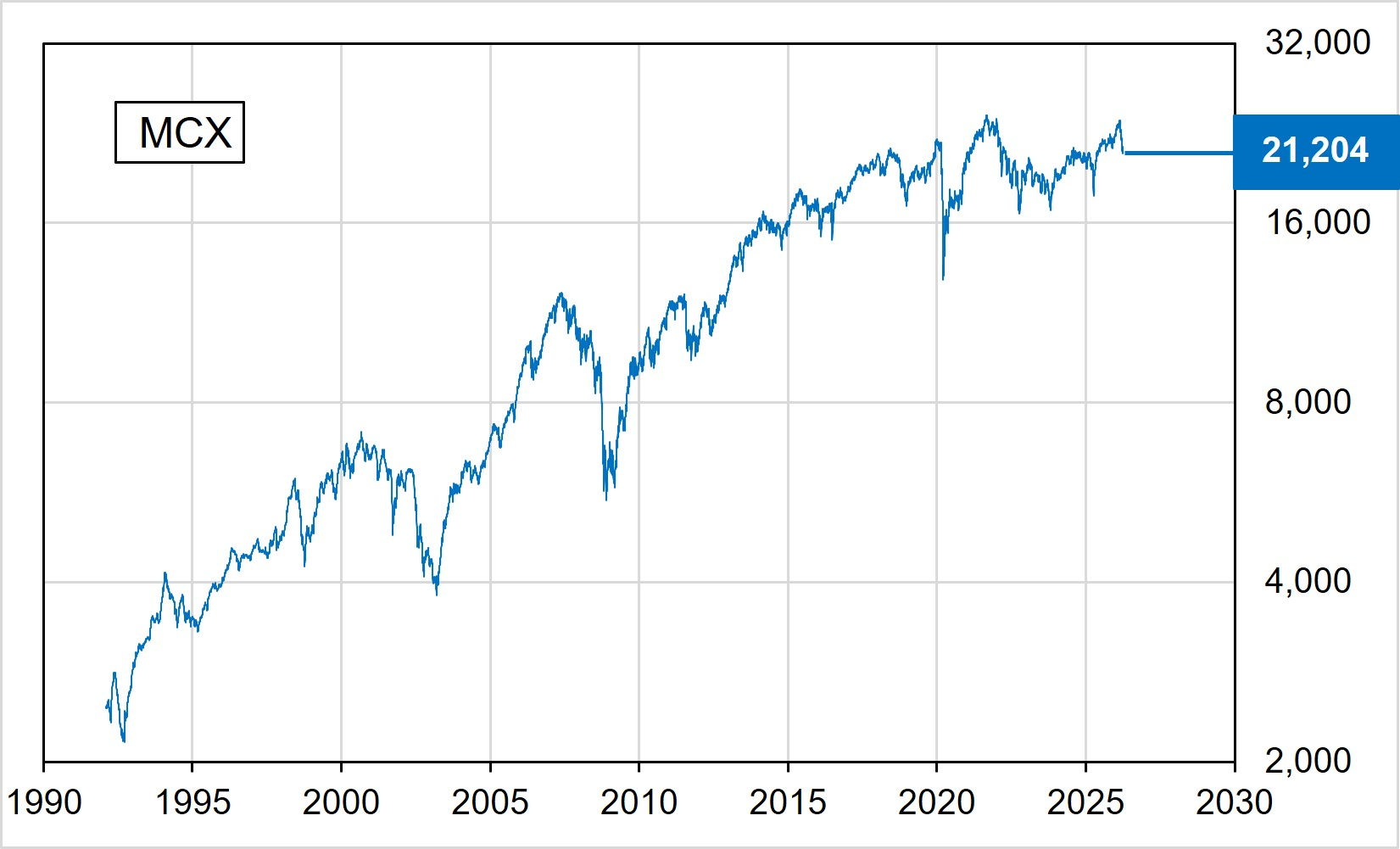
- Performance of the FTSE 250 index between October 1992 and March 2026
- Foundation: 12 October 1992
- Operator: FTSE Russell
- Exchanges: London Stock Exchange
- Trading symbol: MCX
- Constituents: 250 (March 2026)
- Type: Mid-cap
- Market cap: £274 billion (March 2026)
- Weighting method: Capitalisation-weighted
- Related indices: FTSE 100 Index; FTSE 350 Index; FTSE SmallCap Index; FTSE All-Share Index; FTSE Fledgling Index; FTSE AIM UK 50 Index
- Website: www.lseg.com/en/ftse-russell/indices/uk
- Reuters: .FTMC
- Bloomberg: MCX:IND

The Financial Times Stock Exchange 250 Index, also called the FTSE 250 Index, FTSE 250, or, informally, the "Footsie 250" /ˈfʊtsi/, is a stock market index that consists of the 101st to the 350th mid-cap blue chip companies listed on the London Stock Exchange.

== Description ==
The index consists of 11 ICB sectors, three of which had a market capitalisation exceeding £25 billion as at 31 March 2026. These are Financials, Industrials and Consumer Discretionary, which together account for approximately 74% of the index's market capitalisation. On the same date, five companies had a market capitalisation exceeding £3 billion: Balfour Beatty, Aberdeen Group, Investec, Taylor Wimpey and Johnson Matthey, together accounting for approximately 6% of the index's market capitalisation.

Each calendar quarter, the FTSE 250's constituents are reviewed and some companies exit or enter the index, resulting in irregular trading volume and price changes as market participants rebalance their portfolios.

Related indices are the FTSE 100 Index (which lists the largest 100 companies), the FTSE 350 Index (which combines the FTSE 100 and 250), the FTSE SmallCap Index and the FTSE All-Share Index (an aggregation of the FTSE 100 Index, the FTSE 250 Index and the FTSE SmallCap Index).

== Record values ==
The index began on 12 October 1992 at 2,403, with a market capitalisation of £98 billion. It closed at 24,250.80 on 1 September 2021, a level it did not surpass until 4 August 2026, when it set a new record high.

== Annual changes ==
The following table lists the annual changes in the FTSE 250 index.

Year	Price only return (excludes dividends received by shareholders)
1994	−7.64%
1995	14.84%
1996	11.67%
1997	6.62%
1998	1.40%
1999	32.75%
2000	1.59%
2001	−9.29%
2002	−27.27%
2003	34.40%
2004	19.49%
2005	26.78%
2006	27.10%
2007	−4.65%
2008	−40.32%
2009	46.3%
2010	24.2%
2011	−12.6%
2012	22.5%
2013	28.8%
2014	0.9%
2015	8.4%
2016	3.7%
2017	14.7%
2018	−15.6%
2019	25.0%
2020	−6.2%
2021	14.6%
2022	−19.7%
2023	4.4%
2024	5.69%
2025	8.96%

While the FTSE 250 had no retail products prior to its 1992 inception date, in the 1990s the index returns were back-calculated to 1986. Indicative values as follows:

Year	Price only	Total return
1986	28.7%	33.4%
1987	8.6%	13.3%
1988	10.2%	15.4%
1989	21.6%	26.7%
1990	−20.1%	−15.8%
1991	11.9%	17.4%
1992	21.1%	26.3%
1993	32.4%	37.5%
1994	−7.6%	−4.4%
1995	14.8%	19.1%
1996	11.7%	15.7%
1997	6.6%	10.6%
1998	1.4%	4.0%
1999	32.8%	36.4%
2000	1.6%	3.9%
2001	−9.3%	−6.8%
2002	−27.3%	−24.8%
2003	34.3%	38.6%
2004	19.6%	22.9%
2005	26.8%	30.3%
2006	27.1%	30.2%
2007	−4.7%	−2.8%
2008	−40.3%	−37.5%
2009	46.3%	50.0%
2010	24.2%	26.9%
2011	−12.6%	−9.9%
2012	22.5%	25.5%
2013	28.8%	31.7%
2014	0.9%	3.7%
2015	8.4%	11.2%
2016	3.7%	6.5%
2017	14.7%	17.7%
2018	−15.6%	−12.7%
2019	25.0%	28.7%
2020	−6.4%	−4.2%
2021	14.6%	16.8%
2022	−19.7%	−17.1%
2023	4.6%	8.0%

== Constituents ==
The following table lists the FTSE 250 companies after the changes on 20 October 2026.

Company	Ticker	FTSE Industry Classification Benchmark sector
3i Infrastructure	3IN	Financial Services
4imprint	FOUR	Media
Aberdeen Asia Focus	AAS	Investment Trusts
Aberforth Smaller Companies Trust	ASL	Investment Trusts
AEP Plantations	AEP	Food Producers
Alfa Financial Software	ALFA	Software and Computer Services
Allianz Technology Trust	ATT	Investment Trusts
Amaroq	AMRQ	Industrial Metals and Mining
AO World	AO	Retail
Applied Nutrition	APN	Food Producers
Ashmore Group	ASHM	Financial Services
Ashoka India Equity Investment Trust	AIE	Investment Trusts
ASOS	ASC	Retailers
Atalaya Mining	ATYM	Industrial Metals and Mining
Auction Technology Group	ATG	Software and Computer Services
AVI Global Trust	AGT	Investment Trusts
Avon Technologies	AVON	Industrial Goods and Services
B&M	BME	Retailers
Baillie Gifford Japan Trust	BGFD	Investment Trusts
Baillie Gifford US Growth Trust	USA	Investment Trusts
Baltic Classifieds	BCG	Consumer Digital Services
Bankers Investment Trust	BNKR	Investment Trusts
A.G. Barr	BAG	Beverages
AJ Bell	AJB	Financial Services
Bellway	BWY	Home Construction
Berkeley Group Holdings	BKG	Household goods & home construction
BH Macro	BHMG	Hedge Funds
Big Yellow Group	BYG	Real Estate Investment Trusts
Biopharma Credit	BPCR	Investment Trusts
BlackRock Greater Europe Investment Trust	BRGE	Investment Trusts
BlackRock Smaller Companies Trust	BRSC	Investment Trusts
BlackRock World Mining Trust	BRWM	Investment Trusts
Bloomsbury Publishing	BMY	Media
Bodycote	BOY	Industrial Engineering
Breedon Group	BREE	Construction & Materials
Bridgepoint Group	BPT	Financial Services
Brunner Investment Trust	BUT	Investment Trusts
Bytes Technology Group	BYIT	Aerospace & Defence
Caledonia Investments	CLDN	Investment Trusts
Capital Gearing Trust	CGT	Investment Trusts
Ceres Power	CWR	Alternative Energy
Chemring Group	CHG	Aerospace & Defence
Chesnara	CSN	Life Insurance
City of London Investment Trust	CTY	Investment Trusts
Clarkson	CKN	Industrial Transportation
Close Brothers Group	CBG	Financial Services
CMC Markets	CMCX	Financial Services
Coats Group	COA	Consumer Staples
Cordiant Digital Infrastructure	CORD	Investment Trusts
Costain Group	COST	Engineering and Construction
Cranswick	CWK	Food Producers
Currys	CURY	Retailers
CVS Group	CVSG	Health Care
Derwent London	DLN	Real Estate Investment Trusts
discoverIE	DSCV	Support Services
Domino's Pizza	DOM	Travel & Leisure
Drax Group	DRX	Electricity
Dr. Martens	DOCS	Retailers
Dunelm Group	DNLM	Retailers
Edinburgh Investment Trust	EDIN	Investment Trusts
Edinburgh Worldwide Investment Trust	EWI	Investment Trusts
Elementis	ELM	Chemicals
Energean	ENOG	Oil & Gas Producers
EnQuest	ENQ	Oil & Gas Producers
Entain	ENT	Travel & leisure
European Smaller Companies Trust	ESCT	Investment Trusts
Eurowag	EWG	Financial Services
Fidelity China Special Situations	FCSS	Investment Trusts
Fidelity Emerging Markets	FEML	Investment Trusts
Fidelity European Trust	FEV	Investment Trusts
Fidelity Special Values	FSV	Investment Trusts
Finsbury Growth & Income Trust	FGT	Equity Investments
FirstGroup	FGP	Travel & Leisure
Foresight Environmental Infrastructure	FGEN	Investment Trusts
Foresight Group	FSG	Investment Banking and Brokerage Services
Frasers Group	FRAS	Retailers
Funding Circle	FCH	Financial Services
Galliford Try	GFRD	Construction
Gamma Communications	GAMA	Telecommunications
GCP Infrastructure Investments	GCP	General Financial
Genuit Group	GEN	Construction & Materials
Genus	GNS	Pharmaceuticals & Biotechnology
GlobalData	DATA	Industrial Goods and Services
Global Smaller Companies Trust	GSCT	Investment Trusts
Goodwin	GDWN	General Industrials
Grafton Group	GFTU	Support Services
Grainger	GRI	Real Estate Investment & Services
Great Portland Estates	GPE	Real Estate Investment Trusts
Greencoat UK Wind	UKW	Gas, Water & Multiutilities
Greencore	GNC	Food, Beverage and Tobacco
Greggs	GRG	Food & Drug Retailers
Halfords	HFD	Retailers
Hammerson	HMSO	Real Estate Investment Trusts
Hansa Investment Company	HANA	Investment Trusts
Harbour Energy	HBR	Oil & Gas Producers
HarbourVest Global Private Equity	HVPE	Equity Investments
Hays	HAS	Support Services
Helios Towers	HTWS	Telecomms
Henderson Far East Income	HFEL	Investment Trusts
Henderson Smaller Companies Investment Trust	HSL	Investment Trusts
Herald Investment Trust	HRI	Investment Trusts
Hg Capital Trust	HGT	Investment Trusts
HICL Infrastructure Company	HICL	Investment Trusts
Hikma Pharmaceuticals	HIK	Pharmaceuticals and Biotechnology
Hill & Smith	HILS	Industrial Engineering
Hilton Food Group	HFG	Food Producers
Hochschild Mining	HOC	Basic Resources
Hollywood Bowl Group	BOWL	Travel and leisure
Hunting	HTG	Oil, Gas and Coal
ICG Enterprise Trust	ICGT	Investment Trusts
Inchcape	INCH	Retailers
IntegraFin Holdings	IHP	Financial Services
International Public Partnerships	INPP	Financial Services
International Workplace Group	IWG	Support Services
Invesco Asia Dragon Trust	IAD	Investment Trusts
IP Group	IPO	Financial Services
ITV	ITV	Media
Johnson Matthey	JMAT	Chemicals
Johnson Service Group	JSG	Industrial Support Services
JPMorgan American Investment Trust	JAM	Investment Trusts
JPMorgan Claverhouse Investment Trust	JCH	Investment Trusts
JPMorgan Emerging Markets Dividend Income	JEMI	Investment Trusts
JPMorgan Emerging Markets Growth & Income	JMGI	Investment Trusts
JPMorgan European Discovery	JEDT	Investment Trusts
JPMorgan European Growth & Income	JEGI	Investment Trusts
JPMorgan Global Growth & Income	JGGI	Investment Trusts
JPMorgan Japanese Investment Trust	JFJ	Investment Trusts
Jupiter Fund Management	JUP	Financial Services
Kainos	KNOS	Software & Computer Services
Keller Group	KLR	Construction & Materials
Kier Group	KIE	Construction & Materials
Lancashire Holdings	LRE	Nonlife Insurance
Law Debenture	LWDB	Investment Trusts
Man Group	EMG	Investment Trusts
ME Group International	MEGP	Leisure Goods
Mercantile Investment Trust	MRC	Collective Investments
Merchants Trust	MRCH	Investment Trusts
Meridian Mining	MNO	Industrial Metals and Mining
Metro Bank	MTRO	Banks
Michael Page	PAGE	Support Services
Mitchells & Butlers	MAB	Travel & Leisure
Mitie	MTO	Support Services
Molten Ventures	GROW	Financial Services
Mondi	MNDI	Containers & packaging
Monks Investment Trust	MNKS	Investment Trusts
MONY Group	MONY	Media
Moonpig	MOON	Retailers
Morgan Advanced Materials	MGAM	Electronic & Electrical Equipment
Morgan Sindall Group	MGNS	Construction & Materials
Murray Income Trust	MUT	Investment Trusts
Murray International Trust	MYI	Investment Trusts
NCC Group	NCC	Software and Computer Services
Neuberger Private Equity Partners	NBPE	Collective Investments
Ninety One	N91	Financial Services
North American Income Trust	NAIT	Investment Trusts
North Atlantic Smaller Companies Investment Trust	NAS	Investment Trusts
Oakley Capital Investments	OCI	Investment Trusts
Ocado Group	OCDO	Food & drug retailers
OSB Group	OSB	Banks
Oxford Biomedica	OXB	Pharmaceuticals and Biotechnology
Oxford Instruments	OXIG	Electronic & Electrical Equipment
Oxford Nanopore Technologies	ONT	Health Care
Pacific Horizon Investment Trust	PHI	Investment Trusts
Pan African Resources	PAF	Precious Metals and Mining
Pantheon Infrastructure	PINT	Investment Trusts
Pantheon International	PIN	Equity Investments
Paragon Banking Group	PAG	Financial Services
Partners Group Private Equity	PEY	Investment Trusts
Patria Private Equity Trust	PPET	Financial Services
Pennon Group	PNN	Gas, Water & Multiutilities
Persimmon	PSN	Household goods & home construction
Personal Assets Trust	PNL	Investment Trusts
Pets at Home	PETS	Retailers
Playtech	PTEC	Software & Computer Services
Plus500	PLUS	Financial Services
Polar Capital Global Healthcare Trust	PCGH	Investment Trusts
Pollen Street Group	POLN	Financial Services
PPHE Hotel Group	PPH	Travel and Leisure
Premier Foods	PFD	Food & Drug Retailers
Primary Health Properties	PHP	Real Estate Investment Trusts
Princes Group	PRN	Food and drink
Qinetiq	QQ	Aerospace & Defence
Quilter	QLT	Financial Services
Rank Group	RNK	Travel and Leisure
Raspberry Pi Holdings	RPI	Technology
Rathbones	RAT	Financial Services
Renishaw	RSW	Electronic & Electrical Equipment
RHI Magnesita	RHIM	Support Services
Rightmove	RMV	Media
RIT Capital Partners	RCP	Investment Trusts
Rosebank Industries	ROSE	Industrial Goods and Services
Rotork	ROR	Industrial Engineering
RS Group	RS1	Industrials
RTW Biotech Opportunities	RTW	Investment Trusts
Ruffer Investment Company	RICA	Investment Trusts
Safestore	SAFE	Real Estate Investment Trusts
Saga	SAGA	Travel and Leisure
Savills	SVS	Real Estate Investment & Services
Schiehallion Fund	MNTN	Investment Trusts
Schroder Asian Total Return Investment Company	ATR	Investment Trusts
Schroder AsiaPacific Fund	SDP	Investment Trusts
Schroder Oriental Income Fund	SOI	Financial Services
Scottish American Investment Company	SAIN	Investment Trusts
SDCL Efficiency Income Trust	SEIT	Energy
Sequoia Economic Infrastructure Income Fund	SEQI	Financial Services
Seraphim Space Investment Trust	SSIT	Investment Trusts
Serco	SRP	Support Services
Shaftesbury Capital	SHC	Real Estate Investment Trusts
Shawbrook Bank	SHAW	Banking
Sirius Real Estate	SRE	Real Estate
Softcat	SCT	Software & Computer Services
Spire Healthcare	SPI	Health Care Equipment & Services
SSP Group	SSPG	Retailers
Supermarket Income REIT	SUPR	Real Estate Investment Trusts
Syncona	SYNC	Pharmaceuticals & Biotechnology
Target Healthcare REIT	THRL	Real Estate Investment Trusts
Tate & Lyle	TATE	Food Producers
Taylor Wimpey	TW	Household goods & home construction
TBC Bank	TBCG	Banks
Telecom Plus	TEP	Telecomms
Temple Bar Investment Trust	TMPL	Collective Investments
Templeton Emerging Markets Investment Trust	TEM	Investment Trusts
The Renewables Infrastructure Group	TRIG	Investment Trusts
THG	THG	Personal Products
TP ICAP	TCAP	Support Services
Trainline	TRN	Industrial Transportation
Travis Perkins	TPK	Support Services
TR Property Investment Trust	TRY	Investment Trusts
Trustpilot	TRST	Technology
Twentyfour Income Fund	TFIF	Investment Trusts
Unite Group	UTG	Real estate investment trusts
Utilico Emerging Markets	UEM	Investment Trusts
Vesuvius	VSVS	General Industrials
Victrex	VCT	Chemicals
Vietnam Enterprise Investments	VEIL	General Financial
VinaCapital Vietnam Opportunity Fund	VOF	General Financial
Vistry Group	VTY	Home Construction
Volex	VLX	Industrial Goods and Services
Volution Group	FAN	Construction & Materials
Watches of Switzerland	WOSG	Personal Goods
Wetherspoons	JDW	Travel & Leisure
WHSmith	SMWH	Retailers
Wickes	WIX	Retailers
Wizz Air	WIZZ	Travel & Leisure
Workspace Group	WKP	Real Estate Investment Trusts
Worldwide Healthcare Trust	WWH	Investment Trusts
XP Power	XPP	Industrial Goods and Services
XPS Pensions	XPS	Financial Services
Young's	YNGA	Travel and Leisure
Zigup	ZIG	Support Services

== See also ==
- FTSE 100
- FTSE All-Share Index
- Fast Track 100 – The Sunday Times list of the 100 largest privately held companies
- Top Track 250 – The Sunday Times list of 250 mid-market privately held companies
