= Touche Remnant =

Touche Remnant (TR) was an investment trust management company. Touche Remnant Investment Management Ltd was originally part of Touche Ross, became completely independent in 1974. By 1989 they had offices in London, New York and Tokyo.

In 1985 they set up a joint venture with the Bank of Tokyo called the Bank of Tokyo-Touche Remnant Asset Management Limited. In 1989 Paul Manduca became chief executive officer of TR, whereupon he engineered their takeover by Société Générale. After sustaining operating losses of £2.1m in 1990 and £3.1m in 1991 TR was bought by the Henderson Group for £42.5m in 1992.
