= Association of Investment Companies =

- Abbreviation: AIC
- Formation: 1932; 94 years ago
- Type: Trade association
- Legal status: Trade body for closed-ended investment companies
- Location: City of London, United Kingdom
- Region served: United Kingdom and Europe
- Members: 275 members
- Chief Executive: Richard Stone
- Funding: Membership fees
- Website: www.theaic.co.uk

The Association of Investment Companies (AIC) is the United Kingdom trade association for the closed-ended investment company industry.

The association represents a broad range of closed-ended investment companies, incorporating investment trusts, offshore investment companies, REITs and Venture Capital Trusts (VCTs) that are traded on the London Stock Exchange, AIM, Specialist Fund Segment and Euronext.

== History ==
It was founded in 1932, and was owned by James Henry. It was previously called the Association of Investment Trust Companies.
