= Henderson Group =

Global investment manager

Henderson Group plc

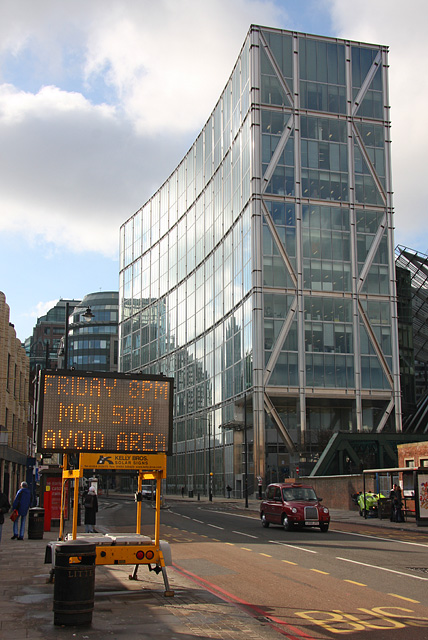
- Henderson Group head office at 201 Bishopsgate, London
- Type: Public company
- Traded as: LSE: HGG, ASX: JHG
- Industry: Investment Management
- Founded: 1934
- Headquarters: London
- Key people: Richard Gillingwater, chairman Andrew Formica, Chief executive
- Products: Equities, fixed income, property, private equity
- Revenue: £738.0 million (2016)
- Operating income: £212.7 million (2016)
- Net income: £109.6 million (2016)
- Number of employees: c. 1,000 (2017)
- Website: henderson.com

Henderson Group plc was a global investment management company with its principal place of business in the City of London. It merged with Janus Capital Group in May 2017 to create Janus Henderson.

== History ==
The company was established in 1934 to administer the estates of Alexander Henderson, 1st Baron Faringdon. In 1975, it started managing pension funds. It was first listed on the London Stock Exchange in 1983.

In March 1998, it was bought by AMP Limited (and subsequently integrated with AMP Asset Management's operations in the UK and Australasia as Henderson Global Investors.)

On demerger from AMP and re-listing as HHG Group in 2003, the group comprised Henderson Global Investors (a UK-based investment manager), Life Services (comprising the life and pension books of Pearl Assurance, NPI, National Provident Life, London Life Association, and HHG Services) and the financial advisory firm, Towry Law. AMP Limited sold its remaining 15% stake in the Company in 2005.

Between 2008 and 2012, the group was tax-resident in the Republic of Ireland. With effect from 12 December 2012, the group changed its tax residency from the Republic of Ireland to the UK by means of a corporate restructuring.

Henderson New Star was established in April 2009 when Henderson Group acquired New Star Asset Management and rebranded its UK retail business. Henderson New Star was rebranded Henderson Global Investors in April 2010.

It manages a various funds with particular strengths in equities, fixed income, commercial property, multi-manager and sustainable and responsible investing (SRI).

Its fund managers included Bill McQuaker, Richard Pease, John Pattullo and James Gledhill. In 2010, the company phased out the New Star name, and in 2014, the company rolled out a new brand identity.

In May 2017, the company completed a merger with Janus Capital Group to form Janus Henderson.

Acquisitions and sales

Transaction	Date
Acquisition of Touche Remnant from Société Générale	1992
Sale of 50% stake in Virgin Money Group to joint venture partner Virgin Group	2004
Sale of Life Services business	2005
Sale of Towry Law, the financial advisory business	2006
Acquisition of New Star Asset Management Group PLC	April 2009
Acquisition of Gartmore Group Limited, giving a combined estimated AUM of £78.1bn as at 31 December 2010	April 2011

== Operations ==
The company invests in four primary asset classes: equities, fixed income, property and private equity. Its institutional product range also includes several hedge funds (under the Alphagen name).
