= Investment trust =

Collective investment fund

An investment trust is a form of investment fund found mostly in the United Kingdom and Japan. Investment trusts are constituted as public limited companies and are therefore closed ended since the fund managers cannot redeem or create shares without the explicit approval of existing shareholders.

The first investment trust was the Foreign & Colonial Investment Trust, started in 1868 "to give the investor of moderate means the same advantages as the large capitalists in diminishing the risk by spreading the investment over a number of stocks".

In many respects, the investment trust was the progenitor of the investment company in the U.S.

The name is somewhat misleading, given that (according to law) an investment "trust" is not in fact a "trust" in the legal sense at all, but a separate legal person or a company. This matters for the fiduciary duties owed by the board of directors and the equitable ownership of the fund's assets.

In the United Kingdom, the term "investment trust" has a strict meaning under tax law. However, the term is more commonly used within the UK to include any closed-ended investment company, including venture capital trusts (VCTs). The Association of Investment Companies is the trade association representing investment trusts and VCTs.

In Japan, investment trusts are called trust accounts (信託口, shintaku-guchi); the largest stockholder of many public companies are usually trust banks handling the investment trusts, the largest being the Japan Trustee Services Bank, The Master Trust Bank of Japan and the Trust & Custody Services Bank.

== Real estate investment trusts ==
In the United Kingdom, REITs are constituted as investment trusts. They must be UK resident and publicly listed on a stock exchange recognised by the Financial Conduct Authority. They must distribute at least 90% of their income.

== Classification of Investment Trusts ==
Investment trusts can hold a variety of assets: listed equities, government/corporate bonds, real estate, private companies and so on. These assets may be listed/incorporated/domiciled in any region. Moreover the investment objectives (growth, income, capital preservation...), risk profile (level of gearing, level of diversification via assets and risk factors) varies. According to such factors, investment trusts are classified into sectors by the industry body, the Association of Investment Companies. The largest sectors by assets under management in December 2017 were Global (£27.1 billion), Private Equity (£14.7 billion), UK Equity Income (£12.0 billion), Infrastructure (£10.0 billion) and Specialist Debt (£7.8 billion).

These sector classifications were revamped in spring 2019. The new list of sectors and constituents comprised 13 new sectors, 15 renamed sectors and 31 sectors that were unchanged. The new sectors were added to reflect the greater numbers of investment companies investing in alternative assets. The amount of money invested by investment companies in alternative assets grew from £39.5bn in 2014 to £75.9bn in 2019. The growing debt sector was separated into three new sectors, Debt – Direct Lending, Debt – Loans & Bonds, and Debt – Structured Finance. Similarly, there were more specialist property sectors: Property – UK Commercial, Property – UK Healthcare, Property – UK Residential, and Property – Debt. Most of the equity sectors were unchanged, but Asia was split into three new sectors, Asia Pacific, Asia Pacific Income, and Asia Pacific Smaller Companies. There were new sectors for Growth Capital and for Royalties.

== Organization ==
Investors' money is pooled together from the sale of a fixed number of shares which a trust issues when it launches. The board will typically delegate responsibility to a professional fund manager to invest in the stocks and shares of a wide range of companies (more than most people could practically invest in themselves). The investment trust often has no employees, only a board of directors comprising only non-executive directors.

Investment trust shares are traded on stock exchanges, like those of other public companies. The share price does not always reflect the underlying value of the share portfolio held by the investment trust. In such cases, the investment trust is referred to as trading at a discount (or premium) to NAV (net asset value).

Unlike open-ended funds that are UCITS, investment trusts may borrow money in an attempt to enhance investment returns (known as gearing or leverage). UCITS funds are not permitted to gear for investment purposes.

The investment trust sector, in particular split capital investment trusts, suffered somewhat from around 2000 to 2003 after which creation of a compensation scheme resolved some problems. The sector has grown in recent years particularly through the launch of investment trusts investing in more illiquid assets such as property, private equity and infrastructure. Assets managed by investment trusts reached £174.4 billion at the end of December 2017.

== Split Capital Investment Trusts ==
Most investment trusts issue only one type of share (ordinary shares) and have an unlimited life. Split capital investment trusts are investment trusts with more than one type of share, such as zero dividend preference shares, income shares and capital shares. However, the number of split capital trusts has fallen dramatically since the split capital investment trust crisis and there were only 12 split capital investment trusts left in existence by 2018. Each of these 12 has only two classes of share: zero dividend preference shares and ordinary shares.

Some split capital trusts have a limited life determined at launch known as the wind-up date. Typically the life of a split capital trust is five to ten years. However, this life can be extended by shareholder vote.

In the heyday of split capital trusts, splits were more complicated and could have share classes such as the following (in order of typical priority and increasing risk):

- Zero Dividend Preference shares: no dividends, only capital growth at a pre-established redemption price (assuming sufficient assets)
- Income shares: entitled to most (or all) of the income generated from the assets of a trust until the wind-up date, with some capital protection
- Annuity Income shares: very high and rising yield, but virtually no capital protection
- Ordinary Income shares (AKA Income & Residual Capital shares): a high income and a share of the remaining assets of the trust after prior ranking shares
- Capital shares: entitled most (or all) of the remaining assets after prior ranking share classes have been paid; very high risk

The type of share invested in is ranked in a predetermined order of priority, which becomes important when the trust reaches its wind-up date. If the Split has acquired any debt, debentures or loan stock, then this is paid out first, before any shareholders. Next in line to be repaid are Zero Dividend Preference shares, followed by any Income shares and then Capital. Although this order of priority is the most common way shares are paid out at the wind-up date, it may alter slightly from trust to trust.

Splits may also issue Packaged Units combining certain classes of share, usually reflecting the share classes in the trust usually in the same ratio. This makes them essentially the same investment as an ordinary share in a conventional Investment Trust.

== Taxation ==
Provided that it is approved by HM Revenue & Customs, an investment trust's investment income and capital gains are generally not taxed within the investment trust. This avoids the double taxation which would otherwise arise when shareholders receive income, or sell their shares in the investment trust and are taxed on their gains.

An approved investment trust must

- be resident in the United Kingdom
- derive most of its income from investments
- distribute at least 85% of its investment income as dividends (unless prohibited by company law)

The company must not hold more than 15% of its investments in any single company (except another investment trust) and must not be a close company. Investment trusts were in 2012 given the ability to distribute capital profits to shareholders. Investment trusts that wished to take advantage of this had to change their Articles of Association, with shareholders' approval, to allow such distributions. However, only a small minority of investment trusts distribute their capital profits.

== See also ==
- Closed-end fund
- Income trust
- Real estate investment trust
- Venture capital trust
- Investment company
