= List of managers of Standard Life Aberdeen =

This page gives a brief summary of the management of The Standard Life Assurance Company (1825-2017).

Management of The Standard Life Assurance Company (1825–2017)
Name	Dates as manager	Biography
Robert Alexander	1825–31	Manager of the Life Assurance Company of Scotland
James Auchinleck Cheyne	1831–37	Manager of the Life Assurance Company of Scotland and the Standard Life Assurance Company
William Thomas Thomson	1837–74	William Thomas Thomson (1813–1883) was born in the Parish of St Andrews, Edinburgh on 25 February 1813 to William John Thomson, RSA, an American from Savannah, Georgia. Thomson joined Standard Life in 1834 as secretary, and was appointed manager in 1837, with Thomas Robertson as his clerk and sub-cashier. In his post as secretary, he 'brought new vigour to the post of secretary, immediately encouraging a reconsideration of the plans for expansion', and his drive continued when he became manager, when he 'at once sought to revive the business, this time by fostering shareholder and customer loyalty. In 1839, Thomson married Christian Anne Seaman, and they lived 'above the office' at number three George Street in Edinburgh (now number one George Street). Under Thomson's leadership, The Standard Life Assurance Company further expanded beyond the United Kingdom and Ireland, including the establishment of a company presence in Canada, Ceylon, the West Indies, and beyond through the Colonial Life Assurance Company, and then through the Standard Life Assurance Company following their merger in 1866. Out with Standard Life, Thomson was a founding member of the Institute of Actuaries in 1848, and the Faculty of Actuaries in Scotland in 1856. He was succeeded as manager by his son, Spencer Campbell Thomson, upon his retirement in 1874.
Spencer Campbell Thomson	1874–1904	Spencer Campbell Thomson (1842–1931) was born 'above the office' at No. 3 George Street on 16 October 1842. Originally educated at Edinburgh Academy and Rugby School, he then studied at Trinity College Cambridge. Following training in actuarial sciences, Spencer Thomson joined Standard Life as a clerk at head office in early 1865, and was quickly promoted to actuarial assistant. He was then promoted to joint-actuary in 1866, before being promoted to assistant manager in 1871, and finally succeeding his father as manager in 1874. Under Spencer Thomson's management, the company expanded to include industry investments, including Barrow Shipbuilding Co., Appleby Iron Co., and Hematite Iron Co, as well as to the Copenhagen-based shipbuilders and engineers, Burmeister & Wain. Additionally, properties were added to Standard Life's portfolio, despite weaknesses in the property market in the 1870s. Spencer Thomson was keen to foster the company's presence globally, and had influence on the company's presence in Canada, India, China, the West Indies, and began to establish a presence within mainland Europe, with agents appointed in both Belgium and Copenhagen. Spencer Thomson retired in 1904 at age 64, and was succeeded as manager by Leonard Walter Dixon.
Leonard Walter Dixon	1904–1919	Leonard Walter Dixon was educated at the Edinburgh Academy and graduated from Edinburgh University in 1886. Leonard Dixon was a chartered accountant when he joined the Standard Life board in 1900, and became manager after Spencer Campbell Thomson's retirement in 1904. While Spencer Thomson's time as manager can be characterised by overseas expansion, Leonard Dixon's management saw the company's overseas presence pulled back, with investigations initiated into the state of business operations both at home and overseas. In addition to changes to the overseas presence of the company, Dixon was forced to make changes on home soil, with a new focus on local campaigns for advertisements and an overhaul of staff. Under his management, Standard Life retreated from Europe, and turned their focus to Latin America, the West Indies, South Africa, and Egypt. During this time Standard Life also looked towards the North American business, with offices expanding into the western provinces of Canada after 1911, with particular focus on Manitoba, Saskatchewan and Alberta, all of which were thriving under the recent wheat boom. Under Dixon, Standard Life brought out several new products, including the UK without-profits endowment scheme (1906), an Endowment policy for children's education, and the Early Thrift Scheme (1911), which encouraged borrowing 'against the security of an endowment policy to buy and furnish' homes. Outwith Standard Life, Dixon was elected chairman of the Association of Scottish Life Offices in 1914. Tragically, Dixon's time as manager ended in on 8 July 1919, while returning to George Street after a Victory Loan rally, he was seriously injured as he attempted to stop a runaway horse and cab in the street. He died of his injuries a fortnight later, and was succeeded by Steuart Edye Macnaghten.
Steuart Edye Macnaghten	1919–1938	Steuart Edye Macnaghten joined Standard Life from Equitable in 1911, and had worked closely with previous manager Leonard Walter Dixon both at Standard life and the Association of Scottish Life Offices, becoming actuary of the company. His great uncle Sir Steuart Macnaghten (Chairman of the Southampton Dock Company) was a member of the Standard Life London board from 1880 to 1895. Under Macnaghten's management, Standard Life turned their focus towards encouraging domestic business following World War One. Immediately several new products were introduced, including plans for women at the same rate as men, an updated public-school policy to offset school fees, and a new death duties policy which later became the Family Provision. To stimulate new business, investigations were to take place every three years from 1920, and in 1921 the Acme scheme, already a popular product in Canada, was implemented in the United Kingdom. At the same time, Pensions schemes were introduced, which would later become a core element of the Standard Life business. After recovering from the impacts of the war, Macnaghten was the driving force behind re-incorporating as a mutual company. First proposed in 1921, mutualisation was approved by shareholder vote and confirmed with a bill passed by parliament in 1925, in time for the company's centenary celebrations. Macnaghten also contributed to Standard Life's position as a leader in mechanisation for life assurance, with the purchase of an addressograph purchased in 1920, a multigraph machine in 1925, and a Powers Samas tabulating machine in 1927. During the Wall Street crash of 1929, Macnaghten increased holdings of government securities and placing greater importance on industrial investments. Outwith Standard Life, Macnaghten was a member of the Cohen Committee on Industrial Assurance. When he retired in July 1938, Macnaghten had been manager for almost twenty years and with the company for almost twenty-seven years. He was succeeded by Albert Edward King.
Albert Edward King	1938–1939	Albert Edward King joined Standard Life in 1915 at the urging of Steuart Macnaghten, whom he had worked with at the Equitable. He was assistant manager at the Equitable, and became secretary and assistant actuary when he joined Standard Life. In 1920 he became a Fellow of the Faculty, and was a strong supporter of Macnaghten throughout his time as manager. With an interest in investment performance, Albert King and Andrew Rutherford Davidson were key to the shift in focus from mortgages to ordinary shares in 1926, and following the Wall Street crash in 1929, Albert King was responsible for calculating values of each class of marketable security, which formed the basis of understanding for the investment committee. Upon Macnaughten's retirement, King became manager. However, shortly after his appointment his health failed, and he was forced to enter a TB asylum in Aberdeenshire. When it was clear that he would not recover, he was succeeded by Alfred John Mascall, the company secretary.
Alfred John Mascall	1938–1942	With previous experience working for the company in Barbados, Alfred John Mascall was involved in the reviving of the West Indies branch in 1929. During the same year, he became assistant secretary for Standard Life. Alfred Mascall became Secretary in 1938, and was then promoted to manager in 1939, on the retirement of Albert Edward King. Under his management, the Wartime Staff Bulletin was established, and he felt strongly that colleague and business updates would be a valuable benefit to staff morale. Mascall retired from the position of manager in 1942.
Andrew Rutherford Davidson	1942–1951	Andrew Rutherford Davidson joined Standard Life in 1914, having previously worked in the Edinburgh office of the English and Scottish Life Assurance Association. As an assistant actuary with an interest in investment performance, A.R. Davidson was jointly responsible, alongside Albert Edward King, for the switch in focus of the company's investments from mortgages to ordinary shares in 1925. Davidson succeeded Edward Blount as agency manager in 1931, working with Alexander Robert Reid as his assistant. As agency manager, Davidson toured the country, visiting branches, and providing energetic encouragement to staff, and pioneering a highly successful overhaul in the way the sales force was managed. He also brought all overseas operations directly under head office, streamlining operations across the company. Across the early 1930s Davidson worked hard to create a branch network across towns and cities, and encouraged a re-design of company promotional materials. Throughout his time with the company, Davidson visited several overseas offices, including India (in 1938), Canada (in 1932), and the West Indies (1946). In 1938 Davidson became deputy manager and actuary, and in 1942 succeeded Alfred John Mascall as manager. Despite staff being members of the reserves, Davidson carried the company through the war and ensured its survival by obtaining new business where possible, maintaining connections with agencies, and cutting costs. Across his career at Standard Life, Davidson was keen to offer mortgages alongside life assurance, especially as private housing markets expanded in England in the early 1930s, and again following World War Two, when he focused on direct contact with customers rather than working through brokers, and fostering local connections. Outside normal business, Davidson was responsible for creating an annual football fixture between the London and Edinburgh offices, as it was practice for staff to organise an outing on the Whit-Monday bank holiday. Through Davidson's hard work, by the time he retired in 1951, Standard Life had become a leader in the UK pensions and life assurance market, and the largest mutual life office of the time.
Alexander Robert Reid	1951–1964	Alexander Robert Reid became assistant agency manager at the Standard Life Assurance Company in 1931, working with Andrew Davidson (agency manager at the time) to increase the focus on mortgages, and was involved in the integration of Heritable Securities and Mortgage Investment Association ("The Heritable"). This focus on mortgage remained particularly important during World War Two, as heritable was given more focus and investments were increased. In 1933 he became investment manager for Standard Life, taking over from T. Dick Peat following his sudden death. In 1942 Reid was promoted to Secretary, and then to manager in 1951. Through his various positions he visited several overseas Standard Life offices including Canada in 1946, where he oversaw the expansion of the Canadian Head office in Montreal, and Uruguay, visiting the Montevideo branch in 1954. Under his management, Standard Life moved away from without-profits policies, and returned their focus to investments in property. While overseas business remained an important part of the company, Reid, continuing work done by previous managers, turned his focus to maintaining and improving home business. In addition, Alexander Reid was known for his support of staff sports societies, and pushed for the purchase of Kingsmeadows House in 1952, and the later use of the property as holiday cottages for staff. When Reid retired as manager in 1964, he was succeeded by James Bremner "Brem" Dow.
James Bremner 'Brem' Dow	1964–1970	James Bremner (Brem) Dow was educated at George Watson's College and Edinburgh and Cambridge Universities, before joining Standard Life in 1928 as a junior apprentice. Brem Dow was responsible for the beginnings of the Standard Life Pensions schemes department in 1931, working with A. Ernest Bromfield, R.H. Mackay, and K.W. Marshall, and, working with Andrew Rutherford Davidson, provided a strong foundation for Standard Life's pensions business. Under Alexander Robert Reid's management, Dow put a particular focus on expanding sales on home ground, rather than focusing extensively on overseas opportunities. Dow became a fellow of the Faculty of Actuaries in 1931, and was appointed joint actuary in 1942. In 1961 Dow was promoted from secretary and actuary, to deputy general manager and secretary, before becoming manager in 1964. Under Dow's management, Standard Life saw a focus on the regionalisation of the company management structure, and training to support the company acting as a single entity. Much like his predecessors, Dow was deeply invested in the concept of mutuality, regularly describing its benefits to policy-holders. During his time as manager, Dow travelled to overseas offices, including a visit to the Canadian office in 1969, and Jamaica in 1970. In addition, Dow contributed to the company sporting legacy, presenting a challenge cup for an annual golf tournament between Standard Life and Scottish Widows. He was appointed president of the Faculty of Actuaries from 1966 to 1968, and retired from Standard Life in 1970.
David William Alexander Donald	1970–1979	David William Alexander Donald (DWA Donald) joined Standard Life in 1932. While company actuary, DWA Donald travelled to the Uruguay branch at Montevideo in 1965 to understand the country's economic situation, and again in 1968, ultimately leading to the closure of the branch in the same year. Donald was promoted from actuary to manager in March 1970, taking over from James Bremner Dow, during a time of uncertainty for the future of the pensions business. With the help of Arthur C. Stepney (Assistant General Manager in charge of Ordinary business), Drew Lyburn, and Peter Glover (Agency Manager), they introduced a new regional system to cover the UK and the Republic of Ireland, allowing regional managers control over both pensions and ordinary sales, beginning with the North West region. In 1975, Donald welcomed HRH the Duke of Edinburgh to the Edinburgh Head Office, where he toured the facilities and met with members of staff. Following concern for the future of the Canadian business following the implementation of the Canadian and British Insurance companies Act, Donald Travelled to Canada in 1977 to assess the feasibility of maintaining the Canadian connection. The following year, in 1978, Donald was involved in discussions regarding the selling of the Canadian Business to Manulife, which was ultimately unsuccessful. In addition to his work within Standard Life, Donald was invested in the arts and various sports, convincing the board to sponsor within both areas, beginning with the opera Die Meistersinger.
George Gwilt	1979–1988	Upon arrival of a Ferranti Pegasus computer (through Edinburgh Computers LTd, a company jointly created with Scottish Widows to own and operate the computer), George Gwilt was appointed computer manager for Standard Life in 1961. In the 1970s Gwilt was Pensions actuary, and was able to argue Standard Life's position when the Labour Government changed legislation plans for pensions in the United Kingdom through connections to Brian O'Malley. During his time as Assistant General Manager (Finance), Gwilt lobbied ministers and Treasury officials, which contributed to the issuing of index-linked gilts in 1981. In 1979 George Gwilt became Manager, and his previous role as assistant general manager was filled by Scott Bell. Under Gwilt Standard Life became a member of the Insurance Ombudsman Bureau, and the company turned their focus of sales of new investment-linked products, and moving away from the with-profits products, which had amassed 97% of new contracts in 1979. Gwilt joined the board of the Bank of Scotland, following the acquisition of Barclay's 35% holding of the Bank of Scotland in 1985. In 1984 Gwilt became a member of the board of directors of Standard Life, while still in office, and became the first manager to do so, changing his title to managing director and actuary. This move predicated the shift to a management group in 1985. Under Gwilt's management, Standard Life had become a forerunner in the investment-bond and unit-trust markets, and saw Standard Life's long-term assets overtake major competitor companies.
Alexander Scott Bell	1988–2002	Alexander Scott Bell was born in Falkirk in 1941, and was educated at Daniel Stewart's College in Edinburgh. Scott Bell joined the Standard Life Assurance Company as a trainee actuary in 1958, before qualifying as an actuary in 1966. He was Assistant Actuary for Canada from 1967 to 1972, before being promoted to Deputy Actuary from 1972 to 1974. The following year he became Standard Life's second south regional manager, taking over from H.W. McLellan upon his retirement. In this position Scott Bell worked closely with Jim Stretton, a partnership which would continue throughout Bell's career. Following George Gwilt's promotion to manager in 1979, Scott Bell was promoted to assistant general manager (finance). Upon the creation of the management group at Standard Life in 1985, Bell was promoted to general manager (finance). In 1988, Bell was once again promoted, this time to managing director and actuary, with Jim Stretton as his deputy. Bell led management through a formal planning process in 1991, looking at areas to develop and improve business. During this process, he was appointed group managing director, with Jim Stretton becoming chief executive of UK operations. As group managing director, Bell was keen to expand the Canadian business, resulting in a restructuring of the branch in the late 1980s. In addition to a focus on existing business, Bell oversaw expansion into Europe and the Far East by entering Spanish and German markets, and reviving connections in India and China throughout the 1990s. Additionally, business expanded into healthcare insurance and banking sectors through the subsidiaries Standard Life Health and Standard Life Bank, and in 1999, with the help of Sandy Crombie, Standard Life Investments Limited was formed. In 2000 Bell successfully led a campaign to stop the company from demutualising, and he retired from his role as Group managing director in 2002. Following his retirement, Ian Lumsden assumed the role of Chief Executive, with Sandy Crombie (ASI) as deputy chief executive.
Iain Lumsden	2002–2004	Iain Lumsden was born in Kirkcaldy, Scotland, on 6 June 1946, and grew up in Liverpool. He completed a mathematics degree at Oxford University, before joining Standard Life as an actuarial student in 1967 before becoming assistant actuary in 1971. From there, he advanced through several positions including organisation and methods manager (1976–81), joint actuary (1981–84), and, following the restructuring of management under George Gwilt in 1985, general manager (actuarial). Following Scott Bell's reorganisation of the management team in 1988, Lumsden was appointed Group finance director and offered a seat on the board in 1989. Lumsden succeeded Scott Bell as Chief Executive in 2002, and immediately needed to address ongoing calls for demutualisation of the company. Lumsden supported the company remaining mutual, and, when SL announced that it was considering demutualisation, Lumsden announced his retirement, and was quickly succeeded by Sandy Crombie, Lumsden's deputy chief executive.
Sandy Crombie	2004–2009	See Sandy Crombie page for details
David Nish	2009–2015	See David Nish page for details
Keith Skeoch	2015–2017 (remains CEO of Standard Life Aberdeen)	See Keith Skeoch page for details.
