= Alex Barr =

Scottish financier and politician

Alex Barr is a Scottish financier and Alderman representing Cordwainer Ward in the City of London. Prior to this he served as a Common Councilman, also in Cordwainer Ward.

Barr attended Queen Anne High School in Dunfermline, Fife and subsequently the University of Aberdeen. He started his career in investment management in Edinburgh, with Franklin Templeton. In 1995 he joined Henderson Investors, now Janus Henderson, on their US Equities desk. He later joined Morgan Grenfell, (which became Deutsche Asset Management and is now known as DWS), where he was a fund manager and led the oversight of their Multi Asset portfolios. The business was taken over in 2005 by Aberdeen Asset Management (now abrdn), for whom Barr was Head of Private Equity and co-head of their European Private Equity Portfolio Management Team. He subsequently formed the investment management business Bread Street Capital Partners, which became Sarasin Bread Street and is part of City of London based investment management firm Sarasin & Partners LLP, where Barr is a partner.

== Bramdean Alternatives ==
Bramdean Alternatives was an investment company formerly run by Nicola Horlick which got caught up in the Madoff investment scandal. Following this in June 2009 Vincent Tchenguiz utilised his investment company Elsina to seize control at an Extraordinary General Meeting. Subsequently in November 2009 Horlick lost control of Bramdean Alternatives as the investment management contract with her Bramdean Asset Management business was acquired by Aberdeen Asset Management. Barr was then responsible for rebranding the company as Aberdeen Private Equity and taking over the running of it.
