= Aberdeen Private Equity =

Aberdeen Private Equity is a private equity business which is part of Aberdeen Asset Management. It was originally known as Bramdean Alternatives.

== Origins ==
Bramdean Assets Management (BAM) was founded in 2005 by Nicola Horlick with Derek Higgs as chair. Bramdean Alternatives Limited was an investment company based in Guernsey, which was a distinct organisation from BAM and had a board chaired by Brian Larcombe, former CEO of 3i. In the summer of 2007 it aimed to benefit from changes introduced by the Financial Services Authority to allow retail investors greater access to alternative investments.

In the summer of 2009 the fund became of interest to the entrepreneur Vincent Tchenguiz, who in June gained control through his company Elsina at an Extraordinary General Meeting.

== Buy-out and subsequent events ==
Horlick lost control of Bramdean Alternatives on 19 November 2009. Aberdeen Asset Management bought out the contract from Bramdean Assets Management, re-branded the project as Aberdeen Private Equity and placed the fund under the management of Alex Barr. Following the 2017 merger of Standard Life with Aberdeen, it became a subsidiary of the company known as Abrdn.
