= Interactive Investor =

British online investment service

Interactive Investor Services Limited
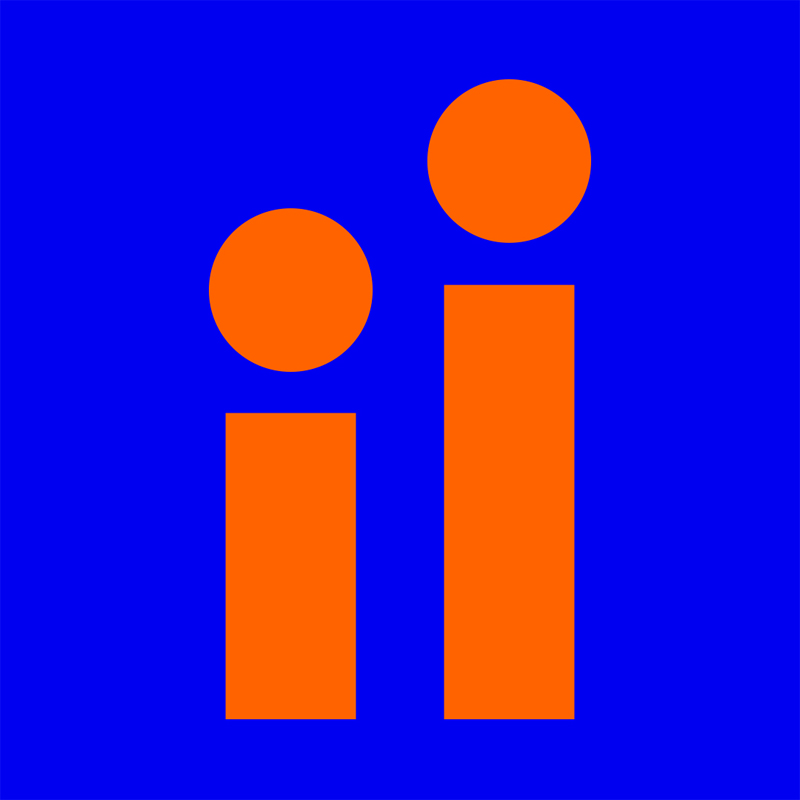
- Company logo
- Trade name: interactive investor
- Company type: Subsidiary
- Industry: Financial services
- Founded: August 1995; 30 years ago
- Headquarters: Manchester, England, UK
- Key people: Richard Wilson (CEO)
- Products: Execution-only online trading in UK and international shares, funds, investment trusts and ETFs, ISAs, Junior ISAs and SIPPs
- Services: Market analysis, tools, virtual and ready-made portfolios
- Revenue: ▲£260.1 million (2024)
- Operating income: ▲£110.9 million (2024)
- Net income: ▲£89.7 million (2024)
- Total assets: ▲£762.4 million (2024)
- Total equity: ▲£406.1 million (2024)
- Number of employees: ▲919 (2024)
- Parent: aberdeen
- Website: www.ii.co.uk

Interactive Investor Services Limited, trading as interactive investor, is a subscription-based online investment service in the United Kingdom, founded in 1995 by the entrepreneur Sherry Coutu. It provides financial information and investment tools. It is the UK's biggest flat-fee investment platform, with (as of 2022) £59 billion of assets under administration and over 400,000 customers. The company is based in Manchester, with offices in London and Leeds. Since 2022, it has been a subsidiary of UK-based investment company Aberdeen.

== History ==
Interactive Investor International was founded in 1994 by Sherry Coutu and funded by angel investors Richard Caruso and John Cooper, as well as the venture capital company, Arts Alliance.

In 1995, Coutu hired Tomas Carruthers from ESI to bring trading capability and equities to supplement the company's fund-management information. Initially launched to provide front-end research to the investment community, it also served as a platform for investors to communicate through discussion boards. The name was changed to Interactive Investor following the company's withdrawal from the South African and Asian markets. Coutu was CEO and Chairman until just before the company's flotation, when Carruthers was named as CEO and Coutu remained Chairman.

The company has grown to become the UK's second-largest retail investment platform, with more than 300,000 customers and more than 7.4 million unique users per annum.

It was floated on the London Stock Exchange in February 2000, gaining a first-day valuation of £550m. The company was unprofitable that year, and by July 2001 its share price had fallen below 25 pence after reaching 415p in March 2000, during the dot-com bubble. Later in 2001, Australian financial services group AMP bought Interactive Investor for a little over £50m, and its investment platform was merged into AMP's Ample brand.

Tomás Carruthers, the company's CEO, was retained by AMP, and in 2003, he regained control through a buy-out. Until its purchase in 2022 by Abrdn, interactive investor was a private limited company incorporated in 2003 and majority owned by funds advised by J.C. Flowers & Co, a leading private equity firm. ii first provided a dealing service in 2010, when it joined forces with Halifax Share Dealing, and went on to set up its own dealing function and customer service centre, based in Glasgow, in 2011.

== Services and products ==
Through the company's direct-to-customer investing and trading service, investors can manage and trade shares, funds, investment trusts, and bonds via trading accounts, ISAs, and SIPPs. The platform also offers comprehensive (Level 2) market data.

These services are supported by portfolio-tracking tools, investment filters, the Super 60 and ACE 40 lists of rated investments, a selection of ready-made investment options, and impartial, specialist news and research from a dedicated editorial team.

In January 2020, ii introduced free regular investing and became the first of the big investment platforms to scrap its fee for the service.

== Acquisitions ==
Interactive Investor (ii) bought personal finance magazine Moneywise from Reader's Digest in 2004. This was followed by the acquisition of investment magazine Money Observer from Guardian Media Group in 2008. Publication of both titles continued until 2020, when Interactive Investor (ii) decided to focus on its core brand.

The broker joined forces with Motley Fool Share Dealing in 2015, replacing Halifax Share Dealing as the brand's service provider.

In October 2016, ii acquired the European business of TD Direct Investing (branded as TD Waterhouse) from its Canadian parent, Toronto-Dominion Bank. With 300,000 UK customers, TD Direct was at the time larger than ii. The acquisition was completed in June 2017 and was financed by J.C. Flowers & Co, which became the group's majority shareholder.

In October 2018, ii announced a deal to buy Alliance Trust Savings, which was completed in July 2019 and brought together the two largest flat-fee online investment platforms.

In February 2020, ii announced its intention to acquire The Share Centre, an independent retail stockbroker. The acquisition was completed in July 2020.

In March 2021, ii announced the acquisition of the EQi direct-to-customer business from Equiniti Group plc.

== Acquisition by Aberdeen ==
Aberdeen Group plc, a British-based financial company formed by the 2017 merger of Standard Life with Aberdeen Asset Management, agreed in December 2021 to acquire ii for £1.49 billion; the sale was completed in May 2022. Richard Wilson would continue to lead the business, which would retain its brand and online infrastructure.
