= James Dow =

James Dow may refer to:

- James Dow (footballer) (1889–1972), English footballer
- James Dow (physician) (1911–1983), Scottish physician
- James L. Dow (1908–1977), Church of Scotland minister, broadcaster and author
- James R. Dow, professor of German at Iowa State University
- James Bremner Dow, Scottish businessman
- James Cameron-Dow (born 1990), South African cricketer
