= Martin Gilbert (businessman) =

British businessman (born 1955)

- Born: Martin James Gilbert; 13 July 1955 (age 71); Kuala Lumpur, Malaysia
- Education: Robert Gordon's College; University of Aberdeen
- Occupation: Businessman
- Years active: 1976–present
- Title: Vice Chairman, Standard Life Aberdeen
- Term: 2019–present
- Successor: Incumbent
- Spouse: Fiona Gilbert
- Children: 3

Martin James Gilbert FRSE (born 13 July 1955) is a British businessman, and the vice chairman of Standard Life Aberdeen and chairman of Aberdeen Standard Investments. He was chief executive (CEO) of Aberdeen Asset Management, an international investment management company, which he co-founded in 1983. He was chairman of FirstGroup from April 1995 to January 2014. He became a patron of The Aberdeen Law Project in 2010.

== Early life ==
Born on 13 July 1955 in Kuala Lumpur, Malaysia, Gilbert was educated at Robert Gordon's College, Aberdeen, and the University of Aberdeen and has an LLB in Law and an MA in Accountancy. He was in the same year of law school at the University of Aberdeen as Alistair Darling.

== Career ==
Gilbert co-founded Aberdeen Asset Management in 1983.

Gilbert received an honorary doctorate from Heriot-Watt University in 2014 and was elected a Fellow of the Royal Society of Edinburgh in 2017.

In March 2017, a merger between Standard Life and Aberdeen Asset Management was announced. At the time, the merger created the UK’s largest asset management firm, and the second biggest in Europe.

In November 2019, Gilbert was appointed chairman of UK-based neobank Revolut. The next month, he stepped down from the board of Standard Life Aberdeen (SLA) and left SLA altogether in September 2020. In 2020, Gilbert was named as chairman of the Oil and Gas Technology Centre (OGTC), now the Net Zero Technology Centre, for the energy industry.

== Personal life ==
Gilbert and his wife Fiona, professor of radiology at the University of Cambridge, have three children.
