= LendingCrowd =

- Type: Private
- Founded: 2014; 12 years ago
- Founder: Stuart Lunn
- Headquarters: Edinburgh, Scotland, United Kingdom
- Area served: United Kingdom
- Products: Business loans
- Website: lendingcrowd.com

LendingCrowd is a British financial technology company that provides business loans to small and medium-sized enterprises (SMEs). The company is based in Edinburgh, Scotland and was originally founded as a peer-to-peer lending platform, enabling individual investors to earn interest by pooling their capital with other lenders and funding business loans.

LendingCrowd fully transitioned its business model in 2022 and loans to SMEs are now funded by institutional capital. In 2024, the business announced that it would close the peer-to-peer part of the business.

== History ==
Founded in January 2014 and launched in October 2014, LendingCrowd is the trading name of Edinburgh Alternative Finance Ltd. The business was founded by CEO Stuart Lunn. Since October 2014, the LendingCrowd platform has delivered more than £600 million in loans to SMEs across Britain.

LendingCrowd is authorised and regulated by the Financial Conduct Authority (FCA), although the business has applied to cancel its authorisation due to its exit from the peer-to-peer industry. In November 2016, the business became one of the first peer-to-peer lenders to move from interim permissions to being fully authorised.

In February 2017, LendingCrowd became one of the first peer-to-peer business lending platforms to provide the Innovative Finance ISA. Only platforms that are fully authorised by the FCA are eligible to offer this product.

In October 2018, LendingCrowd announced the appointment of former Standard Life CEO Sir Sandy Crombie as its chairman.

Scottish Enterprise and NIBC Bank agreed in May 2019 to lend a combined £18.75 million via the LendingCrowd platform to SMEs. This was the second lending deal that LendingCrowd had agreed with Scottish Enterprise, the first being a £2.75 million commitment made in 2016. The May 2019 institutional funding deal started the transformation of the business model.

During the Covid-19 pandemic in 2020, the British Business Bank (BBB) accredited LendingCrowd to provide loans to SMEs via the Coronavirus Business Interruption Loan Scheme (CBILS).

In 2022, LendingCrowd was accredited by the BBB to support businesses through the Recovery Loan Scheme (RLS). Peer-to-peer investors were not permitted to participate in CBILS and RLS lending, so LendingCrowd pivoted its business to institutional funding. A £100 million funding line with Barclays Bank and a global investment firm was announced in February 2022.

In January 2026, LendingCrowd was ranked as Britain's ninth-fastest growing software company in The Sunday Times 100 Tech ranking of privately owned technology businesses. LendingCrowd was included in the inaugural Sunday Times Scotland Fast 50, published in June 2026.

== See also ==
- Business loan
