= William Thomas Thomson (actuary) =

Scottish actuary (1813–1883)

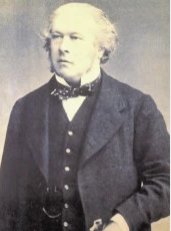
William Thomas Thomson c. 1850

William Thomas Thomson FRSE FFA (1813–1883) was a 19th-century Scottish actuary who was manager of the Standard Life Assurance Company 1834 to 1878 and changed the face of insurance through use of mortality rates. His use of actuarial tables became common practice across the globe in the field of life insurance.

== Personal life ==
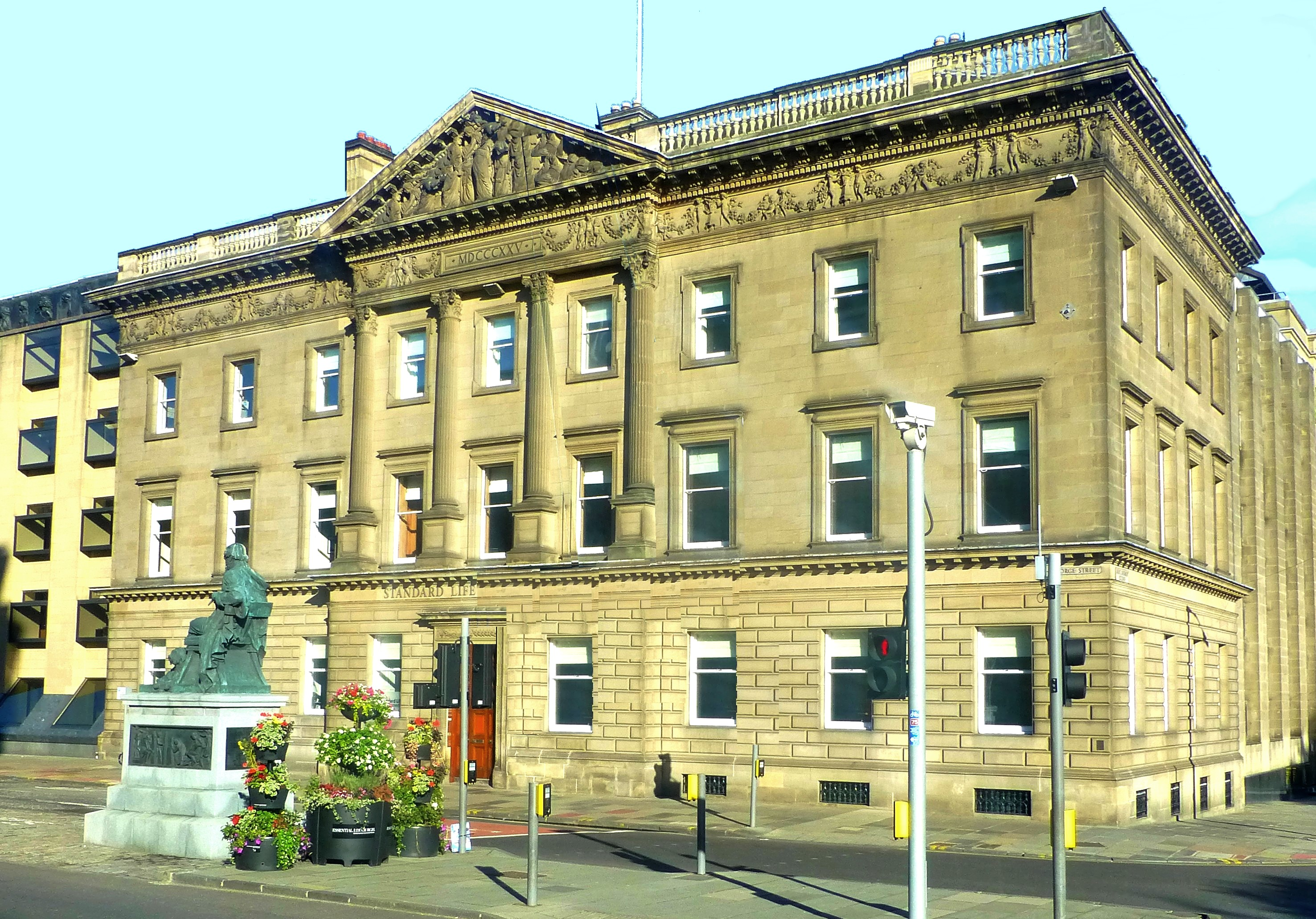
Standard Life Assurance office in Edinburgh

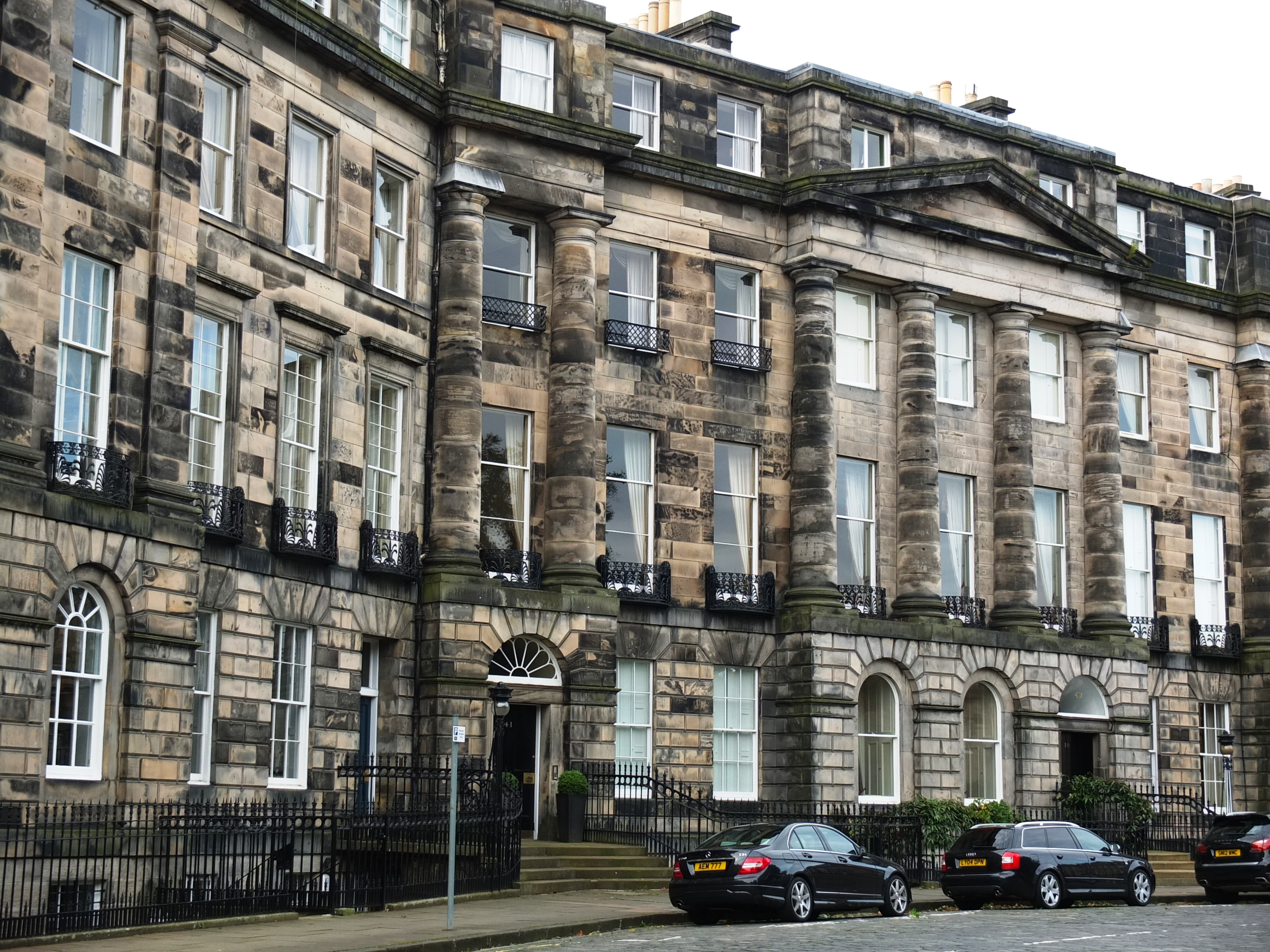
41 MORAY PLACE

He was born on 25 February 1813, in the parish of St Andrews, in Edinburgh.

He appears in Edinburgh around 1833 as an accountant living at 57 Northumberland Street in the Second New Town. In 1839 he married Christian Anne Seaman, and by 1842 he was living with his family in a suite above the company offices at 3 George Street.

Around 1860 he moved to a magnificent townhouse at 41 Moray Place on the Moray Estate in Edinburgh's fashionable West End, but still retained his suite at George Street.

== Career ==
In 1834 he joined Standard Life Assurance in Edinburgh as their Secretary and by 1837 found himself in charge as manager of the company, taking over from his predecessor James Auchinleck Cheyne. Through both positions, Thomson had a strong philosophy of expansion; largely through the acquisition of rival companies. These included Commercial Assurance and Victoria, Legal & General. He worked closely with Robert Christison (as medical advisor) to create tables of life expectancy based on life styles. The company rewarded customers who had a "standard life" (normal life) whilst charging others a higher premium (or refusing them insurance). Once he was appointed manager, his plans for expansion focused on fostering shareholder and customer loyalty, reviving business prospects.

In 1845 he began venturing into foreign expansion and created a sister company: the Colonial Life Assurance Company, who shared the George Street head office. They had branch offices in London, Trinidad, Tobago, Jamaica, Canada, India, Uruguay, China, South Africa and Germany.

In 1849 he was elected a Fellow of the Royal Society of Edinburgh. His proposer was John Graham MacDonald Burt. Additionally, Thomson was a founding member of the Institute of Actuaries in 1848, and the Faculty of Actuaries in Scotland in 1856.

He retired in 1878 and passed his management role to his son, Spencer Campbell Thomson. Thomson died in Edinburgh in 1883.

== Publications ==
- Actuarial Table (1853)
- Decimal Coinage (1854)
- Notes on the Pecuniary Interests of Heirs of Entail
