= Martin Gilbert (disambiguation) =

Martin Gilbert is the name of:

- Sir Martin Gilbert (1936–2015), British historian
- Martin Gilbert (businessman) (born 1955), British businessman
- Martin Gilbert (cyclist) (born 1982), Canadian cyclist

== See also ==
- Martin Gilbert Barrow (born 1944), Hong Kong politician
