= George James Lidstone =

British actuary

George James Lidstone FIA FSA FRSE (11 December 1870 – 12 May 1952) was a British actuary who made several contributions to the field of statistics. He is known for Lidstone smoothing and Lidstone series. He served as President of the Faculty of Actuaries from 1924 to 1926.

== Life ==
He was born in London on 11 December 1870, the youngest of five children of Eliza Munnings and her husband, William Thompson Lidstone from Devon.

He was educated at Birkbeck School in Clapton. He qualified as an actuary in 1891 and began working for the Alliance Assurance Company in 1893. He was promoted rapidly and ended as Secretary of The Equitable Life Assurance Society in 1905.

In 1913 he moved to Edinburgh in Scotland as Manager and Actuary of the Scottish Widows Fund. In 1918 he was elected a Fellow of the Royal Society of Edinburgh. His proposers were Sir Edmund Taylor Whittaker, George MacRitchie Low, John Horne and Cargill Gilston Knott.

The University of Edinburgh granted him an honorary doctorate (LLD) in 1925.

From 1929 his health failed and he stepped down from most active roles. He also went totally blind. He died in Edinburgh on 12 May 1952.

== Family ==
His wife, Florence Mary Gay, died in 1942. They lived at Hermiston House, west of Edinburgh.

After his wife's death he moved to 23 Wester Coates Avenue, in Edinburgh's West End.
