= Money Observer =

British personal finance magazine

Cover of August 2013 issue of Money Observer

Money Observer was a British monthly personal finance and investment magazine which began as a newspaper supplement in 1979, and in 2008 was acquired from Guardian Media Group by Interactive Investor. Publication ceased in 2020.

== History and profile ==
First published in October 1979 as a supplement in The Observer Sunday newspaper, the magazine expanded from 12 pages to an average of 100 pages per issue. In addition to share tips, the editorial team offered advice on topics ranging from savings accounts to stock broking.

The magazine formed part of the purchase of The Observer by Guardian Media Group in 1993; at that time its circulation was almost 24,000.

In 2004 Interactive Investor bought Moneywise, another monthly personal finance magazine, from Reader's Digest. In 2008 the company acquired Money Observer from the Guardian group, and from then both titles were published by Moneywise Publishing Limited, a wholly owned subsidiary of II.

Circulation of Money Observer declined to 16,500 in 2018 and 12,000 in 2019. Although the business was profitable, in June 2020 Interactive Investor announced that the August 2020 editions would be the last and that both magazines would cease publication.

== Regular sections ==
- EasyMoney: All the latest news from the savings and investment industry, including alerts and analysis of new products and services.
- GrowMoney: Share tips and strategies, plus fund profiles and hidden investment opportunities.
- SmartMoney: Financial planning coverage on topics such as savings, taxation, life assurance, retirement planning and other low-risk investment products, plus the latest mortgage, cash ISA, tax and annuity rates.
- AnalyseMoney: Full performance tables for all UK-authorised funds, investment trusts and UK-listed shares.

== Awards ==
- Winner of the Consumer Financial Magazine of the Year award 2001, 2002 and 2004 (category no longer exists)
- Best Consumer Financial Journalist (Association of Investment Trust Companies Journalist Awards, 2003 and 2008) – Andrew Pitts, Editor Money Observer
- Best Consumer Financial Journalist (Association of Investment Companies Awards, 2011 and 2012) – Ruth Emery, Managing Editor Money Observer
- Personal Finance Trade Newcomer of the Year (Santander Media Awards, 2012) – Holly Black, Staff Writer Money Observer
