= Skeoch (surname) =

Skeoch is a surname. Notable people with the surname include:

- Keith Skeoch (born 1956), British businessman
- William Skeoch Cumming (1864–1929), Scottish watercolourist
