= James Bremner Dow =

Businesspeople from Edinburgh

- Education: George Watson's College; University of Cambridge; Edinburgh

James Bremner (Brem) Dow was educated at George Watson's College and Edinburgh and Cambridge Universities, before joining The Standard Life Assurance Company in 1928 as a junior apprentice. Brem Dow was responsible for the beginnings of the Standard Life Pensions schemes department in 1931, working with A. Ernest Bromfield, R.H. Mackay, and K.W. Marshall, and, working with Andrew Rutherford Davidson, provided a strong foundation for Standard Life's pensions business. Under Reid's management, Dow put a particular focus on expanding sales on home ground, rather than focusing extensively on overseas opportunities. Dow was appointed joint actuary in 1942, promoted to from secretary and actuary to deputy manager and secretary in 1961, and finally manager in 1964.

Under Dow's management, Standard Life saw a focus on the regionalisation of the company management structure, and training to support the company acting as a single entity. Much like his predecessors, Dow was deeply invested in the concept of mutuality, regularly describing its benefits to policy-holders. During his time as manager, Dow travelled to overseas offices, including a visit to the Canadian office in 1969, and Jamaica in 1970.

In addition, Dow contributed to the company sporting legacy, presenting a challenge cup for an annual golf tournament between Standard Life and Scottish Widows during his tenure. He became a fellow of the Faculty of Actuaries in 1931, and was later President (1966-1968). Dow retired as manager in 1970, and was succeeded by David William Alexander Donald.
