= The Share Centre =

UK retail stockbroker

- Company type: Subsidiary of Interactive Investor
- Industry: Stockbroker
- Founded: 1990
- Founder: Gavin Oldham
- Defunct: January 2022
- Fate: merged with interactive investor
- Headquarters: Aylesbury, Buckinghamshire, England
- Products: Share accounts, investment club accounts, estate administration, probate services
- Number of employees: 250 (at its height)
- Website: www.share.com

The Share Centre was an independent UK retail stockbroker based in Aylesbury, Buckinghamshire, England.

== History ==
The Share Centre was founded by Gavin Oldham, formerly of Barclayshare (now Barclays Stockbrokers) in 1990. It was based in Aylesbury, Buckinghamshire. The Share Centre Limited operated as a subsidiary of Share PLC until the acquisition by Interactive Investor. It was a member of the London Stock Exchange and regulated by the Financial Conduct Authority.

In February 2020, Interactive Investor announced its intention to acquire Share PLC (The parent company for The Share Centre). The acquisition was completed in July 2020. All The Share Centre customers affected by the move migrated to the ii platform between February 2021 and November 2021.

== Products ==
In Spring 1991, The Share Centre started as a retail broker offering self-select share dealing services to personal investors. Within 18 months, it secured contracts to provide white-labelled share dealing services for readers of the Mail on Sunday, The Guardian and a large regional newspaper group.

In 2000, it set up a holding company, ShareMark. By 2008, the company floated with a share offer that was four times oversubscribed. It now has more than 227,000 customers across the UK.

In May 2011, The Share Centre deployed a log management and security information and event management (SIEM) solution from LogRhythm. In May 2012, The Share Centre discarded T1PS Investment management's Tom Winnifrith as manager of its two small-cap mandates in favour of former Unicorn founder Peter Webb. In May 2012, The Share Centre has appointed Rufus Leonard to overhaul its website.

In April 2015, Barclays Stockbrokers ceased offering certificated share dealing and transferred all customers requiring the service to The Share Centre. In July 2015, the retail stockbroker completed the integration of more than 11,000 Barclays’ customers.

In August 2018, the Share Centre was selected by PWC, to take on an estimated 15000 former clients of the collapsed broker Beaufort Securities.
