= Fiona Gilbert =

Scottish radiologist and academic

- Education: Glasgow University (MD)
- Known for: National Breast Screening Programme for the North East of Scotland, research in breast and ovarian cancer
- Spouse: Martin Gilbert
- Children: 3
- Scientific career
- Fields: Radiology
- Workplaces: University of Aberdeen 1996–? University of Cambridge 2011–present

Fiona Jane Gilbert FRSE is a Scottish radiologist and academic.

== Background ==
Gilbert graduated in medicine from Glasgow University in 1978. She trained in radiology in Aberdeen, and became a consultant radiologist in 1989, then appointed Roland Sutton Professor of Radiology at the University of Aberdeen in 1996. She was assigned the role of professor of radiology and head of the Department of Radiology at University of Cambridge in 2011, where she leads a team of researchers at the University of Cambridge School of Clinical Medicine in various fields of radiology. Prior to this she was head of the Aberdeen Biomedical Imaging Centre, University of Aberdeen and was responsible for the National Breast Screening Programme for the North East of Scotland. Undertaking research in breast imaging and ovarian screening during that time she learnt research methodology and was appointed to the chair in radiology in 1996. She is a Professorial Fellow at Newnham College, Cambridge where she supervises PhD students. She was appointed a Fellow of the Royal Society of Edinburgh in March 2021 and elected a Fellow of the Academy of Medical Sciences in 2022.

== Research ==
Gilbert is best known for her extensive research in breast and ovarian cancer. Her current clinical research is focused on imaging breast cancer, in multimodal functional imaging of the tumour microenvironment using breast cancer as a model, and using these combined imaging techniques to map the tumour genetic profile. She has been awarded grants in excess of £33m over the last 10 years from the Medical Research Council, Engineering & Physics Research Council, National Institute for Health Research (NIHR) Health Technology Assessment Board, Cancer Research UK either as chief investigator or co-applicant Current research which she undertakes at Addenbrooke's (Cambridge University Hospital) includes evaluating Digital Breast Tomosynthesis (DBT), non-FDG PET radiotracers in cancer, and breast MRI. Other trials are the TOMMY trial, a comparison of 2D mammography and DBT, a sub study of the POETIC trial evaluating PET FLT to measure cell proliferation and sophisticated functional MRI in breast cancer with comparison with novel histology and molecular markers and the assessment of pre-operative breast MRI in an international study. She also maintains a strong interest in musculo-skeletal imaging and oncological imaging.

== Memberships ==
Gilbert sits on many advisory boards and chairs several groups. She is the Chair of the Academic committee of the Royal College of Radiologists and Chair of the NCRI Imaging Advisory group. She is immediate past Chair of the Royal College of Radiologists Breast Group, previous co-lead of the NCRI PET Research Development group and was a member of the ACORRN international scientific advisory committee. She sat on guideline development groups for breast imaging for SIGN and NICE and the family history of breast cancer guideline development group. She was the Radiology Representative – Scottish Cancer Group (2001-2005) and member of the Cancer Research Portfolio Steering Group, Chief Scientist's Office (2003–2007). She is also a member of the NIHR EME Board and was a member of the Commissioning Board for the Health Technology Assessment Panel (2003-2006) and Royal College of Radiologists Research Committee (1998-2002.) She is on the MRC Panel of Experts and is an Academic role model for the British Medical Association. She referees for Radiology, the Breast and was assistant editor of Clinical Radiology (1997-2006). She has been a National Panellist for Radiology (1995-2007) and FRCR Part I Examiner, Royal College of Radiologists (1997- 2002). She was joint chairman – Scottish Audit Gastric and Oesophageal Cancer Group (1996-2001) and chairman of the Computer Aided Diagnosis working party for the NHSBSP.

== Publications (selected) ==
Gilbert has published over 175 peer review papers.

- TOMMY trial: The accuracy of digital breast tomosynthesis in detecting breast cancer subgroups in a UK retrospective reading study (TOMMY Trial).Gilbert, FJ; Tucker, L; Gillan, MG; Willsher, P; Cooke, J; Duncan, KA; Michell, MJ; Dobson, HM; Lim, YY; Suaris, T; Astley, SM; Morrish, O; Young, KC; Duffy, SW (2015). "Accuracy of Digital Breast Tomosynthesis for Depicting Breast Cancer Subgroups in a UK Retrospective Reading Study (TOMMY Trial)". Radiology. 277 (3): 697–706. doi:10.1148/radiol.2015142566. PMID 26176654.
- Use of new imaging techniques to predict tumour response to therapy.
- United Kingdom Magnetic Resonance Imaging in Breast Screening Study, Cancers in BRCA1 and BRCA2 carriers and in women at high risk for breast cancer: MR imaging and mammographic features. Gilbert, F.J., R.M. Warren, G. Kwan-Lim, D.J. Thompson, R.A. Eeles, D.G. Evans, M.O. Leach, and G.Radiology, 2009. 252(2): p. 368.
- Single reading with computer-aided detection for screening mammography. Gilbert, F.J., S.M. Astley, M.G. Gillan, O.F. Agbaje, M.G. Wallis, J. James, C.R. Boggis, S.W. Duffy, and C.I. Group.New England Journal of Medicine, 2008. 359(16): p. 1684.
- Single reading with computer-aided detection and double reading of screening mammograms in the United Kingdom National Breast Screening Program. Gilbert, F.J., S.M. Astley, M.A. McGee, M.G.C. Gillan, C.R.M. Boggis, P.M. Griffiths, and S.W. Duffy.Radiology, 2006. 241(1): p. 53.

== Personal life ==
Gilbert is married to businessman Martin Gilbert and has three children.
