= Faculty of Actuaries =

Scottish professional body

The Faculty of Actuaries in Scotland was the professional body representing actuaries in Scotland. The Faculty of Actuaries was one of two actuarial bodies in the UK, the other was the Institute of Actuaries, which was a separate body in England, Wales and Northern Ireland. While the Faculty of Actuaries and the Institute of Actuaries were separate institutions, they worked very closely together, and the professional qualifications and professional standards for actuaries were identical in each of them. On 25 May 2010, voting members of the Faculty who took part in a ballot voted to merge the Faculty with the Institute of Actuaries, thus creating the Institute and Faculty of Actuaries which came into being on 1 August 2010, superseding the Faculty of Actuaries which ceased to exist on that date.

== Establishment of the Faculty of Actuaries ==
The Faculty of Actuaries was founded by 38 Scottish actuaries on 4 January 1856 with the aim of representing the interests of actuaries practising in Scotland.

In September 1868, the Faculty of Actuaries became the first actuarial organisation to be granted a royal charter. The Royal Charter confirmed the Faculty's role and the right to confer qualifications, i.e. the Fellow of the Faculty of Actuaries (FFA). Since then there has been an underpinning concept of professional behaviour and the implicit right, or even duty, to discipline members who did not conduct themselves appropriately.

Over the last two decades the Faculty worked closer and closer with its sister body the Institute of Actuaries and, prior to the merger of the two bodies, reached a stage where almost all aspects of both bodies were run jointly; for example whilst Maclaurin House in Edinburgh was the home of Faculty Council the main purpose of the executive in Maclaurin House is to provide professional regulation services to all members of the UK Actuarial Profession.

In November 2006 the incoming President of the Faculty announced his intention to investigate whether or not the time was now right to restructure to reflect the reality of the arrangements between the Faculty and the Institute and to move towards merger of the two bodies. After investigation and consultation of the issues Faculty Council elected to actively pursue merger with the Institute.

On 17 March 2008 a group of 10 members of the Faculty requisitioned a Special General Meeting which was duly held on 16 April 2008. Of the 137 voters;

• 61% supported a resolution to explore improved co-operation in the joint governance of the bodies and as part of this to consider annually renewable delegations

• 58% supported a resolution directing Council to arrange detailed consultation with the membership; and

• 53% suggested a resolution directing Council to cancel the proposed in principle vote and instead to put to members a range of options and to facilitate a single transferable vote.

As a result, in late 2008 both the Faculty and Institute arranged a survey of the whole membership to ascertain their view in principle on a merger between the two bodies. At the closing date on 8 August 2008 some 1,366 Faculty members voted on this in principle survey with 65% of those voting supporting merger, whilst 6,928 Institute members voted of which 84% supported a merger.

The Faculty and the Institute continued, in line with the majority vote, to work up proposals for merger. However, a formal opposition group, FIDELIS — The Actuarial Defence Group (), was formed in November 2008 by several members including Past Presidents and Vice-Presidents of the two bodies to oppose the merger. A formal vote on the combined merger, name change and new charter was held on 23 July 2009, when the Faculty vote passed the required threshold but the Institute vote failed.

Following extensive consultation with members of both the Faculty and Institute of Actuaries, a revised merger proposal was put to members on 25 May 2010. Voting members of the Faculty and Institute of Actuaries voted to merge the bodies to form the Institute and Faculty of Actuaries.

After approval by the Privy Council, the Institute and Faculty of Actuaries came into being on 1 August 2010.

== Examinations ==
Qualification through the Faculty consisted of a combination of examinations and courses. The examinations could only be taken upon having officially joined the body, unlike many other countries where exams may be taken earlier; although a candidate was able to offer proof of having previously covered topics (usually while at University) in order to be exempt from taking certain subjects.

The examinations were split into four sections: Core Technical (CT), Core Applications (CA), Specialist Technical (ST), and Specialist Applications (SA). Study material for the examinations was usually obtained through the official bookshop of the Faculty of Actuaries or through the Actuarial Education Company (ActEd), a subsidiary of BPP Actuarial Education Ltd.

In addition to examinations and courses, it was required that the candidate both complete at least three years work as an actuary and be at least 23 years of age to qualify as a "Fellow of the Faculty of Actuaries" (FFA)

=== Core examinations ===
The Core Technical section consisted of the 8 exams and a "Business Awareness Module," CT9. These were usually first sat by a candidate and included the underlying mathematics involved in actuarial work as well as an introduction to financial and economic issues. These were also the most common exams for which candidates may get exemptions. While these were the first exams, candidates coming from a less mathematical background often found these more difficult than the later ones due to the mathematical theory content. Topics covered included annuities, stochastic modelling, time series, and triangles.

The Core Applications section consisted of two exams and a modeling course, CA2, that focus on the application of concepts learned, especially to insurance companies. This included the communications model, CA3, which tested the candidate on their ability to communicate complex actuarial concepts to others.

=== Specialist examinations ===
The Specialist Technical section represented the first time the candidate has a choice of which exams to take. The candidate chose two from the various actuarial specialist subjects i.e. Health and Care, Life Insurance, General Insurance, Pensions, Finance or Investments and further technical knowledge on said subjects is attained.

The Specialist Applications section allowed the candidate to choose one area for which they take the SA paper and attain full Fellowship; leading to many referring to this as the "Fellowship paper." However, as the rules on the ordering of examinations were relaxed, this examination may be taken before taking some earlier examinations resulting in candidates qualifying on other papers.

== List of Examinations ==
=== Core Technical Stage ===
- CT1 - Financial Mathematics
- CT2 - Finance and Financial Reporting
- CT3 - Probability and Mathematical Statistics
- CT4 - Models
- CT5 - Contingencies
- CT6 - Statistical Methods
- CT7 - Economics
- CT8 - Financial Economics
- CT9 - Business Awareness Module

=== Core Applications Stage ===
- CA1 - Actuarial Risk Management
- CA2 - Model Documentation, Analysis and Reporting
- CA3 - Communications

=== Specialist Technical Stage ===
- ST0 - Alternative Specialist Technical
- ST1 - Health and Care Specialist Technical
- ST2 - Life Insurance Specialist Technical
- ST3 - General Insurance Specialist Technical (replaced with ST7 & ST8 wef 2010)
- ST4 - Pensions and other Benefits Specialist Technical
- ST5 - Finance and Investment Specialist Technical A
- ST6 - Finance and Investment Specialist Technical B
- ST7 - General Insurance: Reserving and Capital Modelling Specialist Technical
- ST8 - General Insurance: Pricing Specialist Technical
- ST9 - Enterprise Risk Management Specialist Technical

=== Specialist Applications Stage ===
- SA0 - Research Dissertation Specialist Applications
- SA1 - Health and Care Specialist Applications
- SA2 - Life Insurance Specialist Applications
- SA3 - General Insurance Specialist Applications
- SA4 - Pensions and other Benefits Specialist Applications
- SA5 - Finance Specialist Applications
- SA6 - Investment Specialist Applications

=== UK Practice Modules ===
for students working in the UK only

- P0 - Generic UK Practice Half Module
- P1 - Health and Care
- P2 - Life Insurance
- P3 - General Insurance
- P4 - Pensions
- P5 - Finance
- P6 - Investment

== Exemptions from Examinations ==
A student may choose to complete an accredited actuarial science degree at an undergraduate or at a postgraduate level through a number of recognised universities. Successful students may offer proof of having covered the topics whilst at university and students may be granted exemptions from certain professional examinations from the Institute of Actuaries.

Depending on the University, a different number of courses may be recognised for exemption. The examinations and the exemption pass level for the examinations is usually externalised by members of the Faculty and/or Institute of Actuaries.

Naturally, the quality of the courses and lecturing at these universities are a determinant as to whether the course is recognised by the Faculty of Actuaries.

Most universities offering actuarial science courses also require the student in addition to complete various other related topics, including statistics, mathematics, applied mathematics, economics and accounting for recognition of an actuarial degree.

Upon completion of the university degree, students would then complete all remaining examinations through the Faculty of Actuaries to qualify as an actuary and become a Fellow of the Faculty of Actuaries(FFA).

Universities offering accredited actuarial courses include:

- AUSTRALIAN NATIONAL UNIVERSITY, AUSTRALIA
- BULAWAYO NATIONAL UNIVERSITY OF SCIENCE AND TECHNOLOGY, ZIMBABWE
- DUBLIN CITY UNIVERSITY, IRELAND
- CASS BUSINESS SCHOOL, ENGLAND
- CITY UNIVERSITY, ENGLAND
- HERIOT-WATT UNIVERSITY (EDINBURGH), SCOTLAND
- IMPERIAL COLLEGE (LONDON) TANAKA BUSINESS SCHOOL, ENGLAND
- LONDON SCHOOL OF ECONOMICS, ENGLAND
- MACQUARIE UNIVERSITY (SYDNEY), AUSTRALIA
- NANYANG TECHNOLOGICAL UNIVERSITY, SINGAPORE
- NORTH WEST UNIVERSITY (POTCHEFSTROOM), SOUTH AFRICA
- QUEENS UNIVERSITY BELFAST, NORTHERN IRELAND
- STELLENBOSCH UNIVERSITY, SOUTH AFRICA
- SWANSEA UNIVERSITY, WALES
- UNIVERSITY OF CAPE TOWN, SOUTH AFRICA
- UNIVERSITY COLLEGE CORK, IRELAND
- UNIVERSITY COLLEGE DUBLIN, IRELAND
- UNIVERSITY OF KENT AT CANTERBURY, ENGLAND
- UNIVERSITY OF KWAZULU-NATAL, SOUTH AFRICA
- UNIVERSITY OF LEICESTER, ENGLAND
- UNIVERSITY OF MELBOURNE, AUSTRALIA
- UNIVERSITY OF NEW SOUTH WALES (SYDNEY), AUSTRALIA
- UNIVERSITY OF PRETORIA, SOUTH AFRICA
- UNIVERSITI TEKNOLOGI MARA (UiTM), MALAYSIA
- UNIVERSITY OF SOUTHAMPTON, ENGLAND
- UNIVERSITY OF THE FREE STATE (BLOEMFONTEIN), SOUTH AFRICA
- UNIVERSITY OF THE WITWATERSRAND (JOHANNESBURG), SOUTH AFRICA

Other qualifications recognised by the Faculty of Actuaries for exemption from certain examinations included:

- ACCA Qualification
- Chartered Financial Analyst (formerly membership of the Association for Investment Management and Research)
- Fellowship of the Chartered Insurance Institute
- Fellowship of the Chartered Institute of Management Accountants
- Fellowship of the Institute of Chartered Accountants in England and Wales
- Fellowship of the Institute of Chartered Accountants in Scotland
- MBA

== Membership Categories ==
In total there were approximately 2500 members of the Faculty of Actuaries falling into the following categories.

- Student actuaries who are members of the Faculty who are taking exams;
- Associates are members who had completed both the CT and CA subjects and had completed one

year's worth of relevant work-based skills experience;

- Affiliates were members of the Faculty of Actuaries who were kept up-to-date with the developments within the Actuarial Profession through publications and were able to participate in meetings, research and conferences;
- Fellows were full members of the Faculty who had met the training demands by both completing all the examinations and meeting the work experience requirements. Fellows had the right to call themselves 'Actuaries'. There were around 1300 fellows of the Faculty of Actuaries.
- Honorary Fellows were voted on by the Council as whom they felt to be able to render assistance in promoting the objects of the Faculty and who were not professionally engaged in practice as an actuary.

== Presidents of the Faculty of Actuaries ==
- 1887-1890 John MacGregor McCandlish
- 1890-1892 Spencer Campbell Thomson, BA
- 1892-1894 Andrew Hugh Turnbull
- 1894-1896 Thomas Bond Sprague, MA LLD
- 1896-1898 James Meikle
- 1898-1900 David Deuchar
- 1900-1903 George MacRitchie Low FRSE
- 1903-1906 Neil Ballingal Gunn
- 1906-1908 Archibald Hewat
- 1908-1910 James John Maclaughlan
- 1910-1913 Gordon Douglas
- 1913-1915 William Hutton
- 1915-1919 George MacRitchie Low FRSE
- 1919-1921 Alfred Ernest Sprague, MA DSc
- 1921-1922 Lewis Potter Orr, FRSE
- 1922-1924 William Gandy Walton
- 1924-1926 George James Lidstone, LLD FRSE
- 1926-1928 Ralph Hill Stewart
- 1928-1930 Charles Guthrie
- 1930-1932 Steuart Macnaghten, ACA
- 1932-1934 Randolph Gordon-Smith
- 1934-1936 Hugh Wylie Brown, FRSE
- 1936-1938 Alexander Graham Donald, MA FRSE
- 1938-1940 William Alexander Robertson, FRSE
- 1940-1942 William Bannatyne
- 1942-1944 Finlay James Cameron, FRSE
- 1944-1946 James Gray Kyd, CBE FRSE
- 1946-1948 Colin Strathern Penn, MC
- 1948-1950 Andrew Rutherford Davidson, FSS
- 1950-1952 John Muirhead Ross, FRSE
- 1952-1954 Richard Lloyd Gwilt, CBE FRSE
- 1954-1956 Kenneth Kilpatrick Weatherhead, MA
- 1956-1958 Francis Joseph Mcgregor, MA
- 1958-1960 Alexander Robert Reid, MA
- 1960-1962 David Alison Brown Scrimgeour
- 1962-1964 Alfred Trevor Haynes, CBE
- 1964-1966 John Leslie Anderson, MA
- 1966-1968 James Bremner Dow, MA
- 1968-1969 Arthur Ernest Bromfield, MA
- 1969-1971 David William Alexander Donald, OBE TD
- 1971-1973 John Young
- 1973-1975 John Galloway Wallace, OBE MA
- 1975-1977 Maxwell Douglas Thornton
- 1977-1979 Robert Eadie Macdonald, MA
- 1979-1981 David Douglas Mckinnon, BSc FIMA
- 1981-1983 George David Gwilt, MA
- 1983-1985 Alexander Denis Shedden, BSc FSA
- 1985-1987 John Maitland Macharg, MA
- 1987-1989 William Morrison Morrison, MA
- 1989-1990 James Mcgill Souness
- 1990-1992 Alistair Neill, MA MS FPMI FCII
- 1992-1994 John Joseph Mccutcheon, CBE MA PhD DSc FRSE
- 1994-1996 George Malcolm Murray, CBE
- 1996-1998 Paul Henry Grace, BSc
- 1998-2000 Cuthbert Whyte Fraser Low, FPMI
- 2000-2002 Thomas David Kingston, MA
- 2002-2004 Thomas Mackenzie Ross, OBE BSc FCIA ASA
- 2004-2006 Harvie Walker Brown, BSc FPMI
- 2006-2008 Stewart Ritchie, OBE
- 2008-2010 Ronnie Bowie
