= Oxford Law Society =

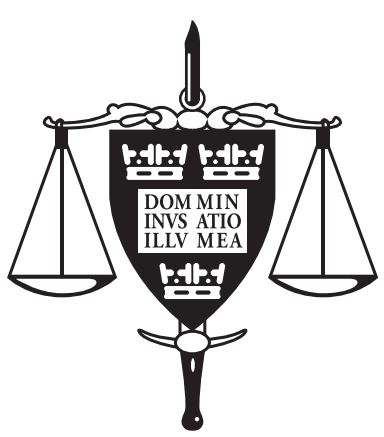
- Type: Student society
- Headquarters: Oxford
- Website: https://oxfordlawsoc.com/

The Oxford Law Society (informally referred to as "LawSoc") founded in 1870 is a student society at the University of Oxford, providing a platform for students to develop their understanding of a career in the legal industry.

The society publishes a termly magazine, Verdict; past contributors include Cherie Blair, Baroness Hale and Baron Goldsmith.

== Past presidents ==
Notable previous presidents include English judge and President of the Queen's Bench Division, Sir Brian Leveson, Foreign Office Minister Alistair Burt MP, former London Mayoral Candidate Steven Norris and investment fund manager Nicola Horlick.
