= David Nish (businessman) =

Scottish businessman (born 1960)

- Born: 5 May 1960 (age 66); Barrhead, Glasgow, Scotland
- Education: Paisley Grammar School
- Alma mater: University of Glasgow
- Occupation: Businessman
- Years active: 1981–present
- Title: former CEO, Standard Life
- Term: 2009–2015
- Predecessor: Sir Sandy Crombie
- Successor: Keith Skeoch
- Spouse: Caroline Nish
- Children: 2

David Thomas Nish (born 5 May 1960) is a Scottish businessman. He is the former chief executive (CEO) of Standard Life, a British long term savings and investment company.

== Early life ==
He was born and brought up in Barrhead, the son of a Royal Mail sorting office manager father (who died from a cerebral haemorrhage when Nish was just 17) and nurse mother. He was educated at Paisley Grammar School and the University of Glasgow, where he graduated with a bachelor's degree in accountancy.

== Career ==
He was CEO of Standard Life from November 2009 until August 2015, having joined on 1 November 2006 as group finance director. He was previously a partner at PricewaterhouseCoopers and finance director of ScottishPower.

== Personal life ==
Nish comes from Glasgow, and still lives there. He and his wife Caroline have been married since 1983 and have two adult children.
