= George MacRitchie Low =

Scottish actuary (1849-1922)

George MacRitchie Low FRSE PFA (1849-1922) was a Scottish actuary. He twice served as President of the Faculty of Actuaries 1900 to 1903 and was recalled during the First World War serving a second term 1915 to 1919.

== Life ==
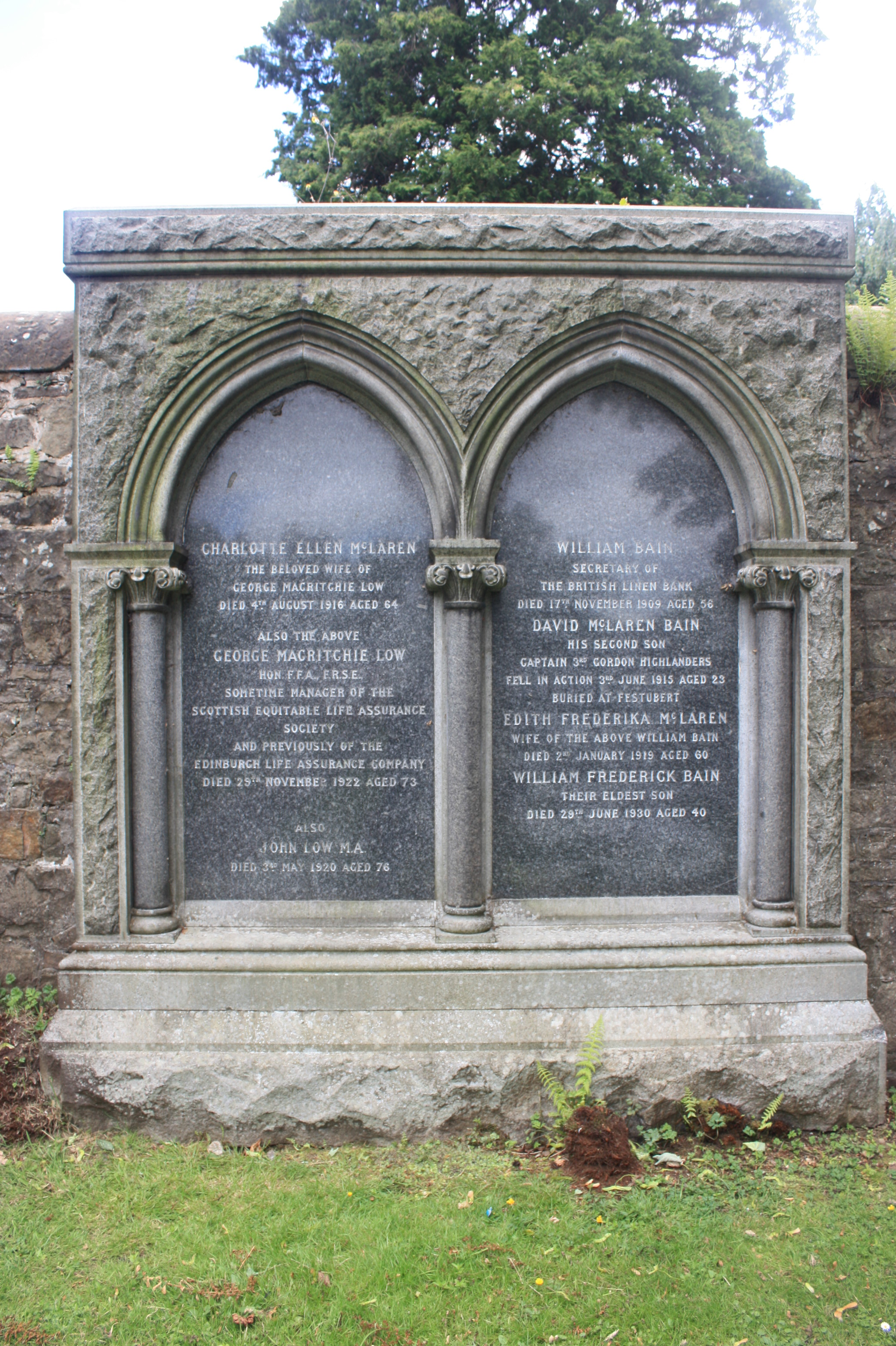
The grave of George McRitchie Low, Dean Cemetery, Edinburgh

He was born at 58 Great King Street in Edinburgh in 1849, the son of William Low, an accountant.

From 1883 to 1900 he was Managing Director of the Edinburgh Assurance Company based at 22 George Street in Edinburgh's First New Town. In 1884 he lived at "Montrave Villa" in the Murrayfield area.

In 1884 he was elected a Fellow of the Royal Society of Edinburgh. His proposers were Andrew Douglas Maclagan, George Barclay, John MacGregor McCandlish and Adam Gillies Smith.

From 1900 to 1920 he was Manager and Chief Actuary of the Scottish Equitable Life Assurance Company at 19 St Andrew Square. By this stage he had moved to 15 Chester Street in Edinburgh's West End. At this same time he was elected President of the Faculty of Actuaries.

He died on 29 November 1922 and is buried in Dean Cemetery. The grave lies against the south wall of the first north extension, backing onto the original cemetery. His older brother Charles MacRitchie Low (1847-1916) lies nearby.

== Family ==
He was married to Charlotte Ellen McLaren (1852-1916).
