= John MacGregor McCandlish =

Scottish lawyer and actuary

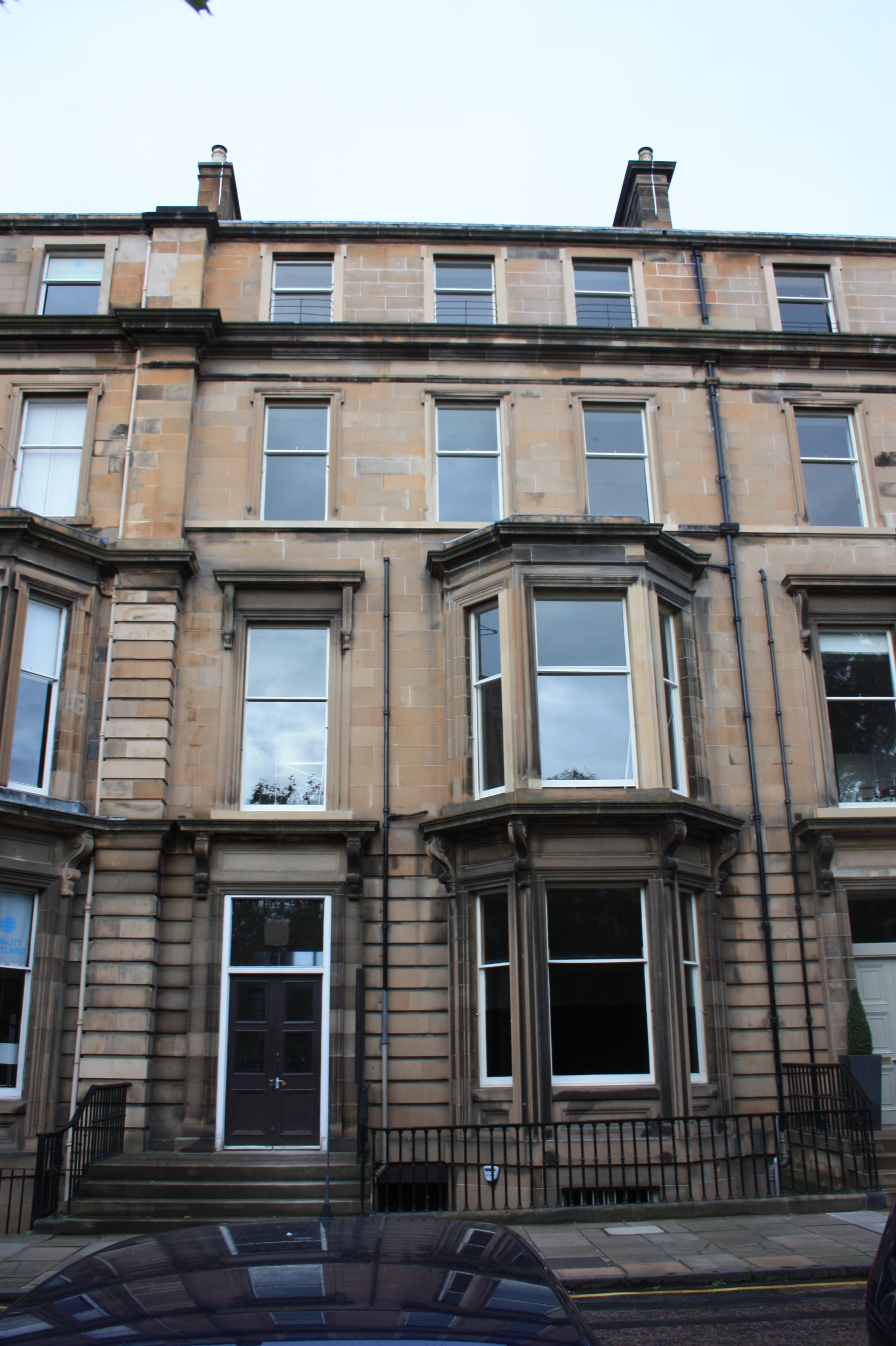
27 Drumsheugh Gardens, Edinburgh

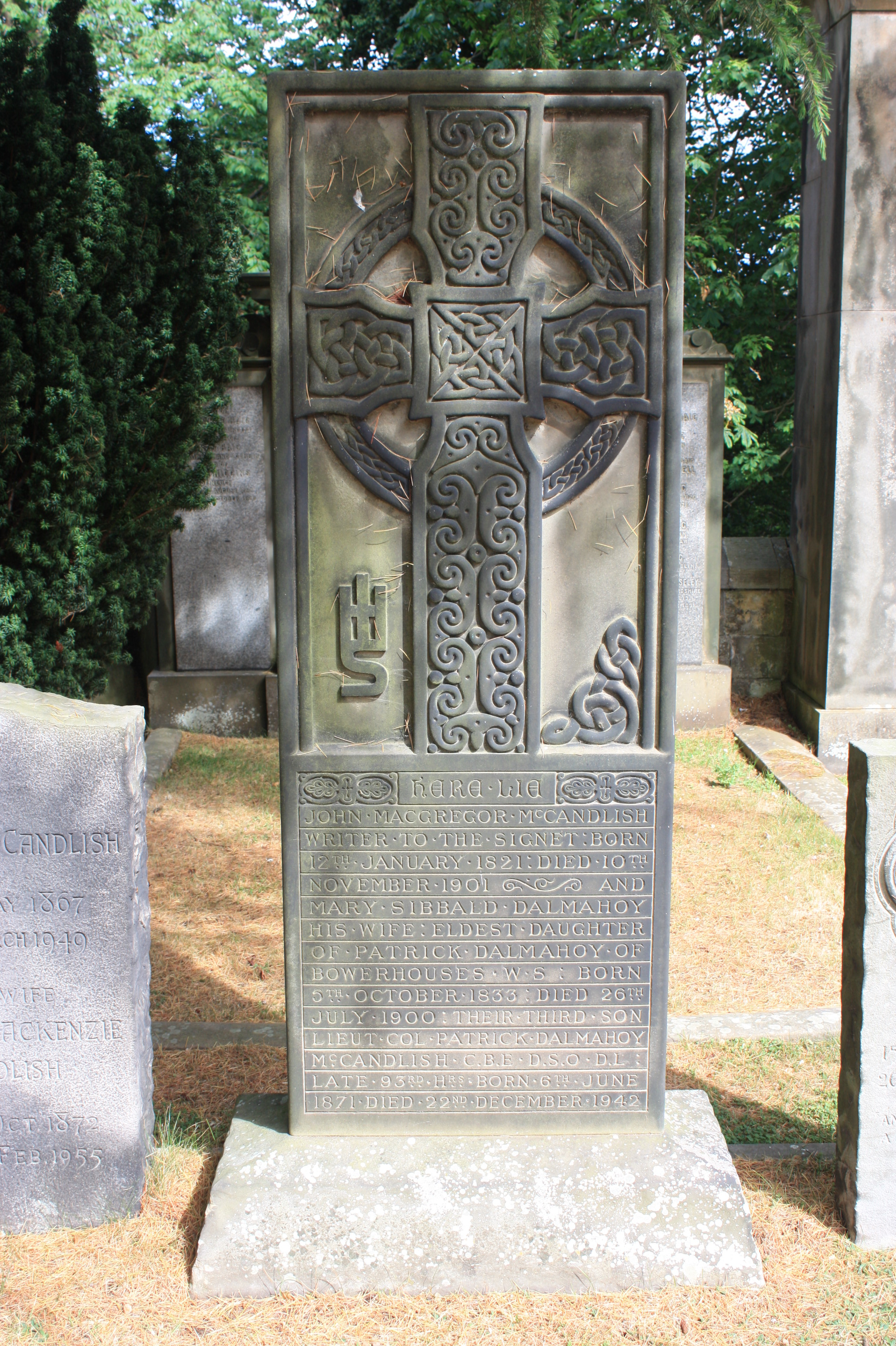
The grave of John MacGregor McCandlish, Dean Cemetery, Edinburgh

John MacGregor McCandlish WS FRSE (1821–1901) was a Scottish lawyer and actuary. He was the first president of the Faculty of Actuaries.

== Life ==
He was born at 17 Minto Street in south Edinburgh on 12 January 1821 the son of William McCandlish of the Exchequer (1788-1872), Receiver General of Taxes for Scotland, and his wife, Felicite Leslie MacGregor (1794-1878).

John was apprenticed to John Archibald Campbell, Commissioner at Law, at 2 Albyn Place in Edinburgh's New Town. In 1845 he became a Writer to the Signet (WS). He then became General Manager and Chief Actuary of the Scottish Union and National Insurance Company. In 1860 he lived at 18 Moray Place on the Moray Estate in Edinburgh.

He was elected a Fellow of the Royal Society of Edinburgh in 1867. His proposer was David Smith. In 1887 he became the first president of the Faculty of Actuaries serving three years and then being succeeded by Spencer Campbell Thomson in 1890.

He died at home, 27 Drumsheugh Gardens in Edinburgh's West End, on 10 November 1901. He is buried alongside the southern path in Dean Cemetery, towards the south-west.

== Family ==
In 1863 he married Mary Sibbald Dalmahoy (1833-1900), daughter of Patrick Dalmahoy WS.
