= Stefan Hoops =

German banker (born 1980)

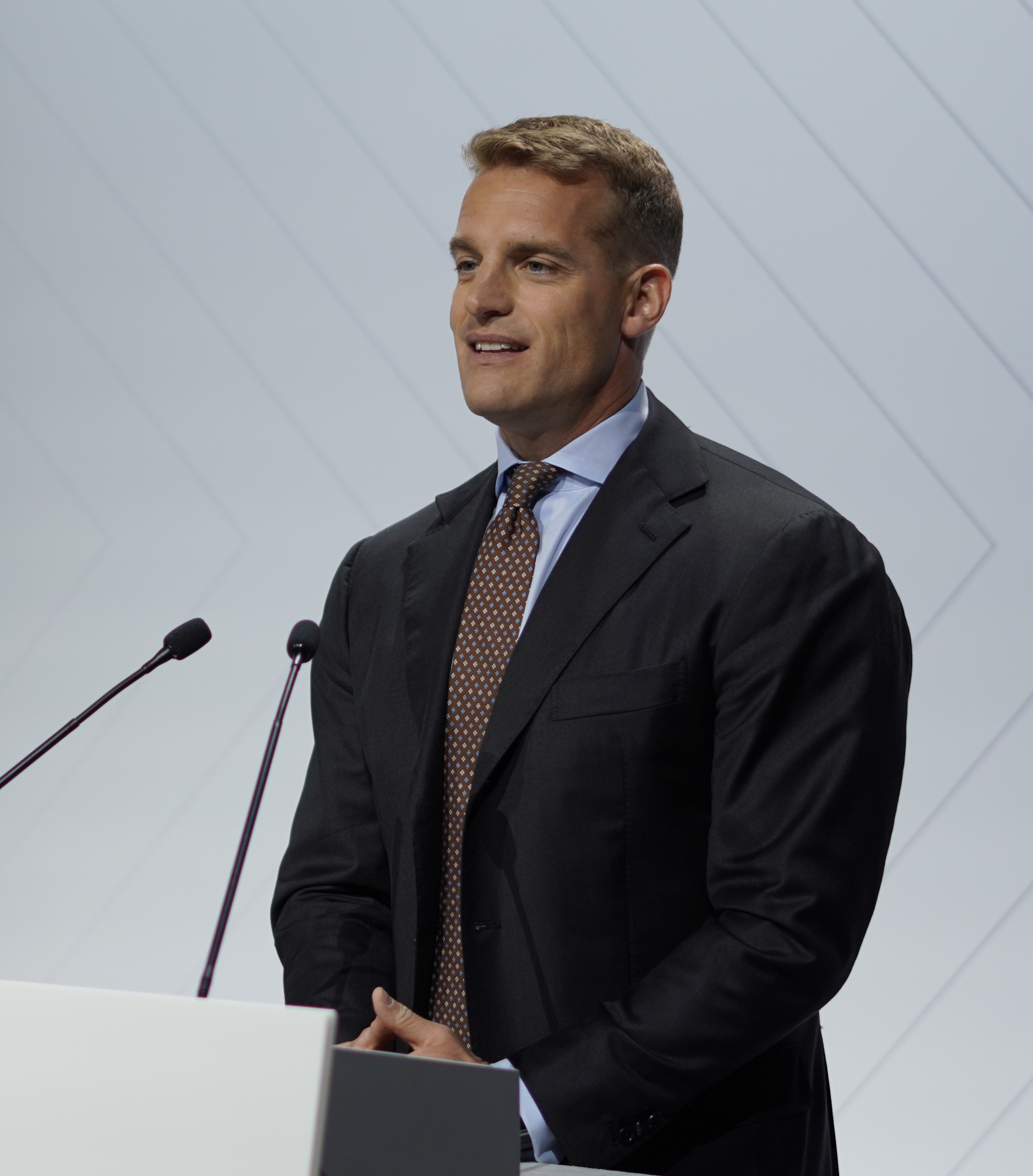
- Born: 29 January 1980 (age 46); Hannover, Germany
- Education: University of Bayreuth
- Occupations: Banker, business executive
- Title: Chief Executive Officer, DWS Group
- Predecessor: Asoka Wöhrmann

Stefan Hoops (born 29 January 1980), is a German banker and business executive. He has been chief executive officer of DWS Group, the asset management subsidiary of Deutsche Bank, since June 2022. Since March 2026, he is member of the management board of Deutsche Bank.

== Early life and education ==
Hoops was born in 29 January 1980 in Hannover. He played basketball during his high school years, including a year spent living near San Francisco.

He studied at the University of Bayreuth where his doctoral thesis explored how financial instruments could be used to alleviate the debt crisis in emerging markets.

== Career ==
Hoops joined Deutsche Bank in Frankfurt in 2003, working on fixed income sales. From 2006 to 2007 he worked for Lehman Brothers in Germany. He later worked in New York, for a time, alongside Greg Lippmann, the Deutsche Bank trader who appeared in The Big Short.

Hoops was appointed in a 2019 restructuring, to head a new corporate bank combining the transaction bank and corporate-client businesses. Hoops was made chief executive of DWS Group in June 2022, succeeding Asoka Wöhrmann, who resigned amid investigations by US and German authorities into allegations of greenwashing at the firm. Hoops was widely described as having been brought in from Deutsche Bank to stabilise the business, although some criticised Hoops' dearth of asset management experience.

Quickly, Hoops removed the ESG classification system at the centre of the allegations, resulting in a 75 per cent reduction in assets classified under environmental, social and governance strategies in DWS's annual report. He acknowledged that the firm's ESG marketing had been overly "exuberant", while maintaining that DWS had not published false reports. In 2024, DWS was fined €25 million by German prosecutors following the conclusion of their investigation. DWS separately reached a settlement with the U.S. Securities and Exchange Commission.

Under Hoops, DWS has pursued a strategy centred on growing its passive investment platform, Xtrackers, alongside expansion into private credit, infrastructure and cryptoassets. By March 2026, DWS shares had roughly doubled since June 2022.

Hoops was appointed to the Deutsche Bank management board in March 2026. He is the youngest member of this group and responsible for Asset Management. Alongside other business leaders including the CEOs of Eon and ThyssenKrupp Steel, Hoops is a member of the Economic Advisory Board of the Green Parliamentary Group in Germany's Bundestag. He was appointed at the point of the group's launch in the first quarter of 2026.

== Public positions ==
Hoops has been an outspoken critic of what he regards as a resurgent culture of machismo in the financial industry and has called on companies to maintain zero tolerance for sexual harassment and to ensure equal opportunities. His position drew public support from other German business executives and was covered widely in the financial and mainstream press.

In 2025, Hoops argued that President Donald Trump's tariff policies had acted as a catalyst for long-overdue reform in Europe, particularly on infrastructure and defence spending.

Hoops has also expressed an interest in the concept of a pan-European stock exchange, an idea championed by Friedrich Merz among others.

== Personal life ==
Hoops is an enthusiast of basketball, a sport he played during his school years, and is known for his commitment to strength and fitness training. He is married and has three daughters.
