= Sherry Coutu =

Canadian-born entrepreneur, angel investor and non-executive director

Sherry Coutu CBE
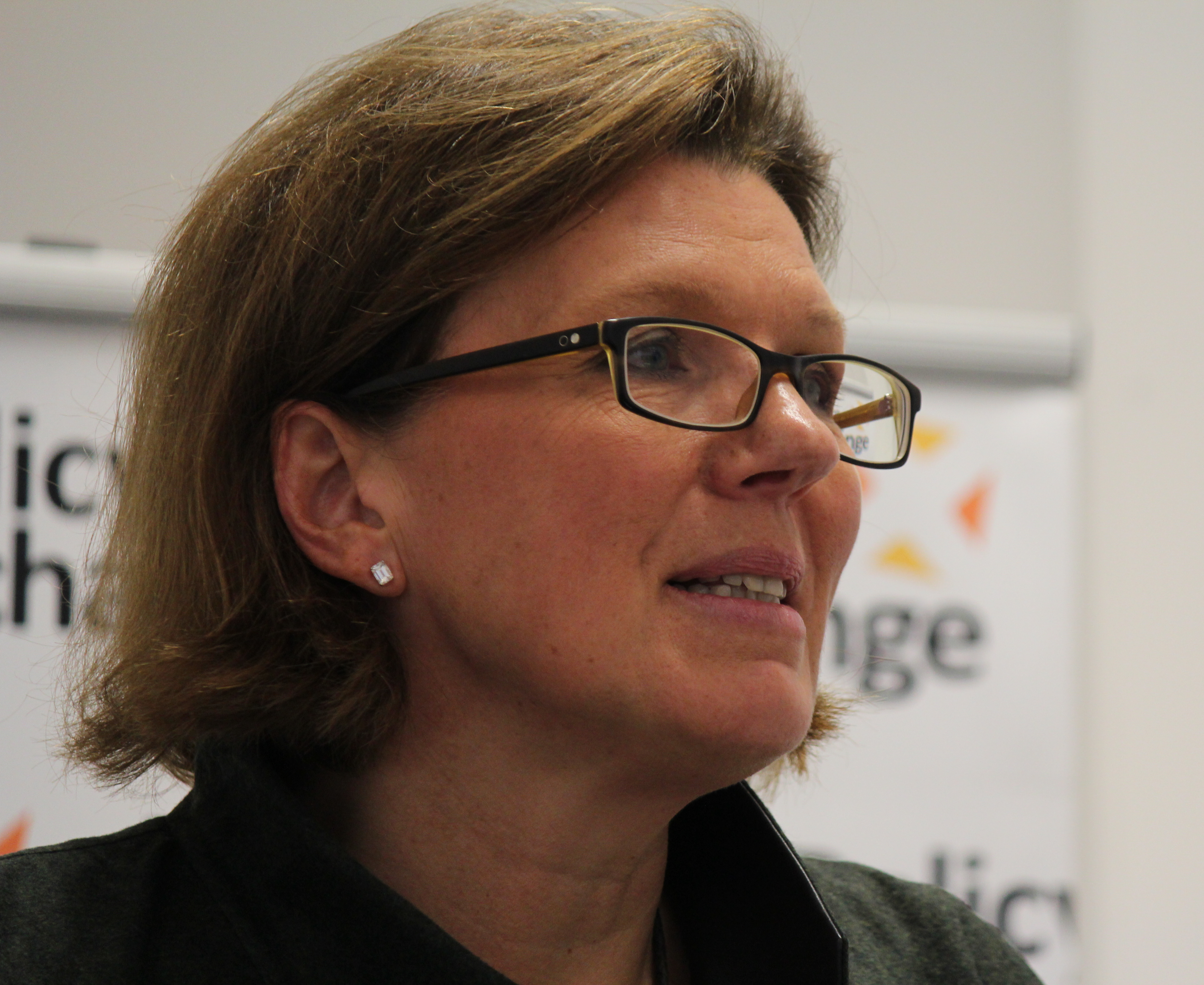
- Born: 1964 (age 61–62)
- Education: Harvard Business School, University of British Columbia, London School of Economics

Sherry Coutu CBE (born 1964) is a Canadian-born entrepreneur, angel investor and non-executive director based in Cambridge, UK.

== Career ==
Coutu graduated from University of British Columbia, with a first class honours BA, in 1986, with distinction from the London School of Economics, with an MSc, in Economics, and from Harvard Business School, with an MBA, in 1993.

As an entrepreneur, Sherry founded Interactive Investor International in 1994. She ran it until 2000 when it was floated on the London Stock Exchange and she stepped down when it was acquired by AMP in 2001.

She became an angel investor in 2000 and since then has worked with hundreds of entrepreneurs and specialised in consumer internet, information services and education. She has made angel investments in more than 50 companies and holds investments in five venture capital firms.

In November 2014, Coutu authored the "Scale-Up Report" which was commissioned by the Digital Economy Council. The report urged the UK government to support 'scaleups' and not only 'startups'.

In June 2015, partnering with Reid Hoffman, the co-founder of LinkedIn, Coutu launched the Scale Up Institute, a non-profit body to support UK businesses wishing to scale up. Support for businesses will include help in improving leadership skills, accessing a network of advisers and raising finance.

In early July 2015 it was reported and later confirmed by Coutu that she would be curtailing her angel investing activities in favour of investing philanthropically in charitable endeavours in the future via Founders4Schools, a charity to improve the employability of young people. In 2017, Founders4Schools launched their work experience service for 16- to 24-year-olds, Workfinder. Workfinder is a TripAdvisor-style app to easily connect young people with fast-growing companies across the UK.

== Positions ==
Coutu is the founder of Founders4Schools, Digital Boost,The ScaleUp Institute She serves as a non-executive board member of Phoenix plc, Raspberry Pi, Pearson plc.

Past positions include serving on the boards of LSEG, DCMS, Zoopla, New Energy Finance, & the Advisory Boards of LinkedIn, the University of Cambridge (Finance Board) and the Natural History Museum.

In February 2020, Coutu was announced as the David Goldman Visiting Professor of Innovation and Enterprise at Newcastle University.

== Accolades ==
Coutu was appointed Commander of the Order of the British Empire in the 2013 New Year Honours for her services to entrepreneurship. In 2019, she was inducted into the BIMA (British Interactive Media Association) Hall of Fame and was the winner of the Veuve Clicquot Social Purpose Award. She was named Most Influential Woman in UK IT 2017, Barclay's Entrepreneur of the Year 2017, Top 50 inspiring women in Europe by the Management Today and Top Entrepreneur contributing to 'Queen and Country' by Sunday Times Magazine. In July 2015 Computer Weekly named Coutu in the top ten most influential women in UK IT industry. In the same year she was ranked 29 on Wired's The 2015 WIRED 100.

== Philanthropy ==
Coutu supports Founders4Schools, the King's Trust, Crick Institute, Cancer Research UK and serves on the Harvard Business School European Advisory Council.
