= Lidstone series =

In mathematics, a Lidstone series, named after George James Lidstone, is a kind of polynomial expansion that can express certain types of entire functions.

Let ƒ(z) be an entire function of exponential type less than (N + 1)π, as defined below. Then ƒ(z) can be expanded in terms of polynomials A_{n} as follows:

$$f(z)=\sum_{n=0}^\infty \left[ A_n(1-z) f^{(2n)}(0) + A_n(z) f^{(2n)}(1) \right] + \sum_{k=1}^N C_k \sin (k\pi z).$$

Here A_{n}(z) is a polynomial in z of degree n, C_{k} a constant, and ƒ^{(n)}(a) the nth derivative of ƒ at a.

A function is said to be of exponential type of less than t if the function

$$h(\theta; f) = \underset{r\to\infty}{\limsup}\, \frac{1}{r} \log |f(r e^{i\theta})|$$

is bounded above by t. Thus, the constant N used in the summation above is given by

$$t= \sup_{\theta\in [0,2\pi)} h(\theta; f)$$

with

$$N\pi \leq t < (N+1)\pi.$$
