= James L. Dow =

James Leslie Dow (5 March 1908 – 1977) was a Church of Scotland minister, broadcaster and author.

Born at Paisley and educated at Glasgow University (Trinity College), Dow was ordained in 1932 and spent several years as a chaplain in Assam, India before becoming minister of Cartsburn Augustine church in Greenock in 1943. In 1965 he became minister at Lochranza on the Isle of Arran, a post he held until his death in 1977.

Dow frequently contributed to the local newspaper, the Greenock Telegraph, and was a contributor to religious programmes on the BBC including Songs of Praise and on Scottish Television (Late Call). In 1973 he wrote a fictionalised account of an encounter between James Graham, Marquess of Montrose and one John Pitcairn, Laird of Cleish in 1649, immediately before Graham's execution by the Covenanters. Dow published his autobiography in 1975, the same year he completed a history of Greenock.

Dow was also a playwright, his 1962 play Tail-piece winning a national amateur dramatics competition. He was an occasional actor, which led one critic to comment that it was the first time he had heard Falstaff portrayed with a Scots accent.

He also wrote a Dictionary of the Bible in 1964 which has remained in print ever since. Dow's son published a collection of his father's writings in 2001.

He is not to be confused with the author of the 1893 book Ten Test Circles, or the Law of Conditions which was also written by a James L. Dow.

== Publications ==
- A Dictionary of the Bible (1964), Collins Gem.
- American Wit and Wisdom (1971), Collins.
- Late and Early (collection of sermons) (1972), St. Andrew Press
- Graham Came by Cleish (novel) (1973), Jarrolds.
- No Better Than I Should Be (autobiography) (1975), Hutchinson
- Greenock (1975), Greenock Corporation
- Words of My Father: A Selection of Talks Broadcast by the Late Rev. James L. Dow (ed. Tom Dow) (2001), Whitewisp Press
