= Halifax Share Dealing =

British online broker

- Company type: Subsidiary
- Industry: Financial services
- Founded: 1997; 28 years ago
- Founder: Halifax Building Society
- Headquarters: Leeds, United Kingdom
- Area served: United Kingdom
- Products: Stockbroking
- Owner: Lloyds Banking Group
- Website: www.halifax.co.uk/sharedealing/

Halifax Share Dealing is a British online broker, allowing customers to buy and sell shares in UK and international companies across a range of markets. It is a subsidiary of the Bank of Scotland which itself is part of the Lloyds Banking Group.

== History ==
The firm was set up to manage the 7.5 million Halifax bank customers who were eligible for shares when the company went public in 1997. It dealt solely in Halifax shares before expanding in 1998 to offer a comprehensive service for retail customers to buy and sell shares in real time.

Halifax Share Dealing was the first in the UK to offer a regular investment plan where customers can buy shares, known as ShareBuilder. Halifax Share Dealing has continued to expand, and now offers a Self Select Funds ISA (Individual Savings Account), a Self Select Stocks and Shares ISA, and a SIPP (self-invested personal pension). Its online research centre, Halifax Marketwatch, enables investors to research companies using a wide range of market information. The company also operates the iWeb online share dealing brand, a legacy of HBOS's 2003 acquisition of the IMIWeb online brokerage from Sanpaolo IMI.

Halifax Share Dealing is based in Leeds and, as of 2014, had more than one million customers. It is part of the Lloyds Banking Group, a British-based financial institution formed through the acquisition of HBOS in 2009 which provides UK retail, wholesale and international banking facilities, as well as insurance and investment services.

== Criticism ==
The share dealing service receives mixed reviews in the media. Consumer magazine Which? praises the low platform fees but is critical of the dated web interface and poor security. Financial review site Boring Money has described the platform as ‘minimalist’ and expresses concern at the lack of two-factor authentication.

== Awards ==
Awards won by Halifax Share Dealing include:

- City of London Wealth Management Awards 2013 – Best ISA Provider
- Shares Awards 2012 – Best Self Select ISA Provider
- What Investment Awards 2011 – Best Share Dealing Service
- Shares Awards 2011 – Best Fund Provider
- MoneyAM Awards 2011 – Best Online CFD Provider
- Shares Magazine Awards 2010 – Best Fund Provider
- What Investment Awards 2010 – Share Dealing Service of the Year
- Personal Finance Awards 2010 – Best Online Stockbroker
- Daily Telegraph Wealth Management Awards 2009 – Best Execution Only Service for Equities
- What Investment Readership Awards 2009 – Best Share Dealing Service
- Share Magazine Awards 2008 – Best Self-Select ISA Provider
- Personal Finance Awards 2008 – Best Online Stockbroker
- What Investment Awards 2006 – Best Stockbroker
- What Investment Awards 2005 – Best Stockbroker
- Personal Finance & Savings Readership Awards 2005 – Best Online Stockbroker
- Personal Finance & Savings Readership Awards 2004 – Best Online Stockbroker
- What Investment Readership Awards 2004 – Best Stockbroker
