= Nicola Horlick =

British Liberal Democrat politician

- Born: Nicola Karina Christina Gayford; 28 December 1960 (age 65); Nottingham, Nottinghamshire, England
- Education: Balliol College, Oxford
- Political party: Liberal Democrats

Nicola Karina Christina Horlick (née Gayford; born 28 December 1960) is a British investment fund manager, dubbed City 'superwoman' in the British media. She has publicly supported the Labour Party and latterly, the Liberal Democrats.

== Early life and education ==
Horlick was born into a family from Cheshire and spent most of her youth on the Wirral Peninsula. Her father, Michael Gayford, was a businessman and Liberal candidate in the 1970s for the Wirral constituency. Her grandmother was a Jewish refugee from Poland.

Horlick attended the independent Kingsmead School in Hoylake, Wirral, between the ages of six and twelve. She was one of four girls amongst 300 boys initially. She then boarded at the independent Cheltenham Ladies' College in 1973. She stayed for two years then went to Birkenhead High School GDST. She also spent some time at the Phillips Exeter Academy in New Hampshire, US, on an English-Speaking Union exchange scholarship. She gained nine O levels, four A levels, and an S level. She gained a place at Balliol College, Oxford, in 1979 to study law, and graduated in 1982. She was president of the Oxford Law Society and counted William Hague, later Conservative Party leader, as a friend.

== Career ==
Between 1982 and 1983, Horlick worked for her father in the family business. She joined S. G. Warburg & Co. as a graduate trainee in 1983, starting in the investment management business, which later became Mercury Asset Management. She was appointed a director in 1989. She joined Morgan Grenfell Asset Management in 1991 and was appointed Managing Director of the UK investment business in 1992. During five years that she was in charge, the amount of assets managed by the firm grew from £4 billion to £18 billion. She was suspended from the job on 14 January 1997 and resigned two days later, after it was claimed she was moving to a rival and trying to get colleagues to join her. Accompanied by a large contingent of reporters, Horlick flew to the company's headquarters in Frankfurt to demand that her job be reinstated. As her future husband later described it, "Amid rumours that she was going to defect to a rival, Horlick had been suspended from a senior job ... She took the trip to Germany accompanied by a piranha shoal of story-hungry hacks."

She set up SG Asset Management in 1997 and Bramdean Asset Management LLP in 2005. In 2008 one of Bramdean's funds, Bramdean Alternatives, had £10 million, about 10 per cent of its assets, invested with Bernie Madoff, money Horlick said she was uncertain she would ever see again. At the time Bramdean shares lost one third of their value. Horlick lost control of Bramdean Alternatives on 19 November 2009. She founded and is the CEO of Money&Co., a marketplace lending business focusing on business loans. She also has a film business called Derby Street Films. Horlick is the Chairman of film finance fund Glentham Capital, which raised funds on equity crowdfunding platform Seedrs in 2013. She was also a founding partner of Rockpool in 2011, which has its offices in Victoria, London. The other businesses are based in nearby Mayfair.

== Politics ==
It was reported that Horlick tried to become a Labour MP in the 1997 United Kingdom general election, and told the Sunday Express that she hoped "that Tony Blair will win the election".

In a May 2017 LinkedIn blog post, Horlick stated that her preferred outcome at the forthcoming 2017 United Kingdom general election was a hung parliament. Horlick encouraged voters in constituencies "where Labour won last time" to vote Labour (under then leader Jeremy Corbyn) so that the UK would "not end up with 'hard' Brexit", and that "the important thing is to avoid a large Tory majority if we are to protect the economic future of our country".

In the wake of the EU referendum, she wrote of her strong opposition to Brexit and cautious support of the Liberal Democrats.

On 3 October 2019, it was announced that she was to be the Liberal Democrat parliamentary candidate in Chelsea and Fulham. Horlick was unsuccessful in her bid to become the MP for Chelsea and Fulham at the 2019 United Kingdom general election; incumbent Greg Hands retained the seat for the Conservatives. She did, however, greatly increase the Liberal Democrats' vote share, from 11% to 26%, finishing in 2nd place.

In the 2022 Hammersmith and Fulham London Borough Council election, she was a candidate in the Munster ward.

== Personal life ==
Horlick has been called "Superwoman" in the media for balancing her high-flying finance career with bringing up six children, Georgina, Alice, Serena, Antonia, Rupert, and Benjie. Her eldest daughter, Georgina, died of leukaemia in 1998 when she was 12. Journalists writing about the role of mothers in the workplace refer to her as an exemplar of "having it all", although Horlick acknowledges her reliance on paid help. According to Horlick, "It's ridiculous that I am known as 'superwoman' ... Look at someone who has no help at home and holds down a job. Or look at me with my nanny and my secretary. Who would you call 'superwoman'?" This nickname came from Shirley Conran's book Superwoman, and apparently pre-dates Horlick's media fame. Her media appearance made her the subject of an Alex cartoon on 25 January 1997.

She married Timothy Piers Horlick, whom she had met while at Oxford, in June 1984, when she was 23. He was also a City investment banker. They separated in December 2003 and divorced in 2005.

Her second marriage was to Martin Baker, a financial journalist, on 8 September 2006. They had met in March 2005, when he interviewed her for The Sunday Telegraph. She acted as technical editor to his thriller novel set in the world of high finance. He died of prostate cancer in November 2022, aged 64.

She lives in Barnes, London. She supports charities such as Just a Drop, which works for clean drinking water worldwide, UNICEF, and Great Ormond Street Hospital.

== Publications ==
- Nicola Horlick (1998). Can You Really Have It All?. London: Pan Books. ISBN 0-330-35459-0.
