= Keith Skeoch =

British businessman (born 1956)

Sir Keith Skeoch
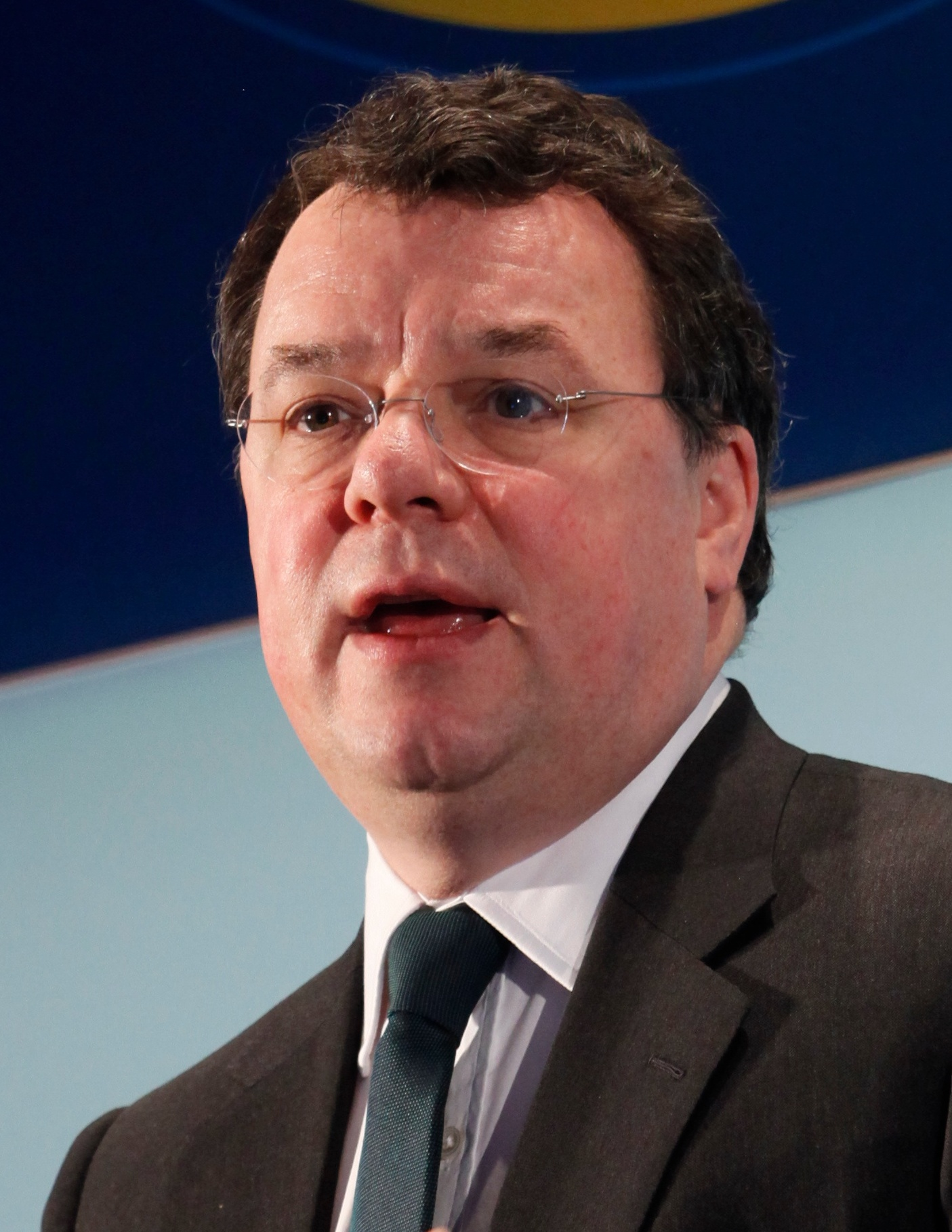
- Keith Skeoch in 2011
- Born: November 5, 1956 (age 69)
- Education: University of Sussex; University of Warwick
- Occupation: Businessman
- Title: Former CEO, Standard Life Aberdeen
- Term: 2015–2020
- Predecessor: David Nish
- Successor: Stephen Bird

Sir Norman Keith Skeoch (born 5 November 1956) is a British businessman. He is the non-executive chairman of QBE, and was the former chief executive (CEO) of Standard Life Aberdeen, a British long term savings and investment company, and head of Aberdeen Standard Investments, its asset management division.

== Early life ==
Norman Keith Skeoch was born on 5 November 1956 in the town of Guisborough.

Skeoch received a BA in Economics from the University of Sussex in 1978, and an MA in Economics from the University of Warwick in 1979.

== Career ==
According to his company profile, Skeoch had previous appointments with James Capel and from 1996 onwards HSBC Securities, where he was the Managing Director of International Equities in 1998, Director of Economics and Strategy (1993), Chief Economist (1984) and in 1980 International Economist. Skeoch began his career in 1979 at the Government Economic Service.

In 1999, he joined Standard Life, and was appointed CEO of the company in August 2015, having been a director since 2006 and chief executive of Standard Life Investments since 2004.

He is also a board member of the Financial Reporting Council. In 2015, he retired as a board member of the Investment Association.

In 2017, Skeoch took a 20% reduction in pay. The year before, he gave up almost £600,000 in bonus payments, accepting a bonus package worth 400% rather than 500% of his base salary.

In March 2017, a merger between Standard Life and Aberdeen Asset Management was announced. The merger will create the UK’s largest asset management firm, and the second biggest in Europe.

He was knighted in the 2023 New Year Honours for services to the financial sector.

== Personal life ==
Skeoch is married with two sons and lives in Edinburgh. He enjoys fishing in his spare time.
