= DWS Group =

German investment management firm

DWS Group GmbH & Co. KGaA
- Type: Public
- Traded as: FWB: DWS; MDAX component
- ISIN: DE000DWS1007
- Industry: Investment management
- Founded: 1956; 70 years ago
- Headquarters: Mainzer Landstraße 11–17, Frankfurt, Germany
- Key people: Stefan Hoops (CEO)
- Products: Mutual Funds; ETFs; Alternative Investments
- Revenue: ▲€2.603 billion (FY 2023)
- Net income: ▲€553 million (FY 2023)
- AUM: €1,010 billion (30 June 2025)
- Total assets: ▲€11.68 billion (FY 2023)
- Total equity: ▲€7.82 billion (FY 2023)
- Owner: Deutsche Bank (79.49%)
- Number of employees: 4,378 (FY 2023)
- Website: dws.com

DWS Group GmbH & Co. KGaA (formerly Deutsche Asset Management), commonly known as DWS, is a German asset management company. It previously operated as part of Deutsche Bank until 2018 where it became a separate entity through an initial public offering on the Frankfurt Stock Exchange. It is currently headquartered in Frankfurt, Germany and is a constituent member of the MDAX index.

== History ==
DWS was founded in Hamburg in 1956 as "Deutsche Gesellschaft für Wertpapiersparen mbH" (German Association for Security Saving), the name was later shortened to DWS, "Die Wertpapier Spezialisten" (The Security Specialists). Originally, the activities involved products and investment services that were initially offered to investors in Germany and throughout Europe. Activities under the DWS Investments brand were later expanded to include separate line-ups of products and investments services for investors in the USA, Asia and other regions.

Originally Deutsche Bank held 30% of DWS while the rest was held by other financial institutions. However, by 2004, DWS was wholly owned by Deutsche Bank.

In 2009, DWS took control over Rosenberg Real Estate Equity Funds (RREEF) which was also owned by Deutsche Bank.

In 2012, Deutsche Bank announced the establishment of its Asset & Wealth Management (AWM) division which DWS was fully integrated into. The DWS brand name was retained as the name for the German retail business. However, in 2015, AWM was split into Deutsche Asset Management and Deutsche Bank Wealth Management.

In 2017, Deutsche Asset Management was rebranded to DWS with Deutsche Bank planning to publicly list a minority stake of it.

In 2018, DWS was spun off as a separate company through an initial public offering on the Frankfurt Stock Exchange. However, despite being a separate company, the majority of DWS shares are still held by Deutsche Bank at 79.49%.

In October 2018, DWS named Asoka Woehermann as the replacement for former CEO Nicolas Moreau.

In 2022, Asoka Wöhrmann resigned from his post of CEO after the company's offices in Frankfurt were raided by police. He was replaced by Stefan Hoops who was previously head of the corporate bank at Deutsche Bank.

In 2026, DWS was rebranded back to Deutsche Asset Management.

== Controversies ==
=== Sustainable investing ===
A DWS annual report in 2020 claimed that half of the company's assets ran through environmental, social and corporate governance (ESG) criteria. An internal report contradicted this, and stated that only a small amount of the firm's investments applied ESG. As a result of the probe, German regulators began investigating Deutsche Bank president Karl von Rohr's role in the DWS.

In 2021, The Wall Street Journal reported that the United States Department of Justice and U.S. Securities and Exchange Commission were investigating DWS' claims of sustainable investing.

In September 2023, DWS agreed to pay $25 million to settle the SEC's charges that DWS failed to develop a mutual fund anti–money laundering program and made misstatements regarding its ESG investment process. DWS did not admit or deny the SEC's findings in its settlements. The greenwashing complaint was led by DWS's previous head of ESG, Desiree Fixler. The DWS's "ESG integration policy" labelled €459bn in assets as green. Adjusting the measurement criteria resulted in a 75 per cent fall in assets reported as green.

== Sponsorships ==
DWS Investments UK sponsored English professional football club, Aston Villa F.C. from 2004 to 2006. After DWS Investments UK was bought out by Aberdeen Asset Management, DWS decided it would not renew its sponsorship contract as it had no more business links with the UK.
