= Sandy Crombie =

British businessman

Sir Sandy Crombie
- Born: Alexander Maxwell Crombie; 8 February 1949 (age 77); Fife, Scotland
- Occupation: Businessman

Sir Alexander Maxwell "Sandy" Crombie FRSE (born 8 February 1949), is a British businessman, chairman of LendingCrowd, chairman of Amiqus Resolution, former chair of Creative Scotland, former non-executive director of Royal Bank of Scotland Group, and formerly the chief executive officer (CEO) of Standard Life, a FTSE 100 long term savings and investment business.

== Early life ==
Crombie was born on 8 February 1949, in Fife, Scotland.

== Career ==
Crombie was 17 when he joined Standard Life as a trainee actuary in 1966. Through his career at Standard life he climbed the ranks, succeeding Jim Stretton as general manager (operations) in 1988, and was appointed general manager (investment and development) in 1994.

As head of investment operations in the UK, Crombie assumed control over Standard Life Portfolio Management activities, the precursor to Standard Life Investments. By 1998, Crombie and Scott Bell were in discussions to create Standard life Investments as a separate brand, specifically to manage the company's investment activities, and he was appointed CEO upon its establishment.

He was appointed head of the Association of British Insurers' investment committee in 2002.

When Scott Bell retired in 2002, Crombie was appointed deputy CEO, and, upon Iain Lumsden's retirement, Crombie took over as CEO of Standard Life, while continuing as CEO of Standard Life Investments.

In 2010, Crombie became president of the Cockburn Association, Edinburgh's long-running conservationist charity.

== Honours and awards ==
In 2009, Crombie received a knighthood for services to the insurance industry in Scotland. In 2018, he was elected a Fellow of the Royal Society of Edinburgh.
