= Spencer Campbell Thomson =

Scottish actuary and influential businessman (1842–1931)

Spencer Campbell Thomson FRSE FFA (1842–1931) was a Scottish actuary and influential businessman. He introduced statistical mortality rates into life insurance.

== Personal life ==
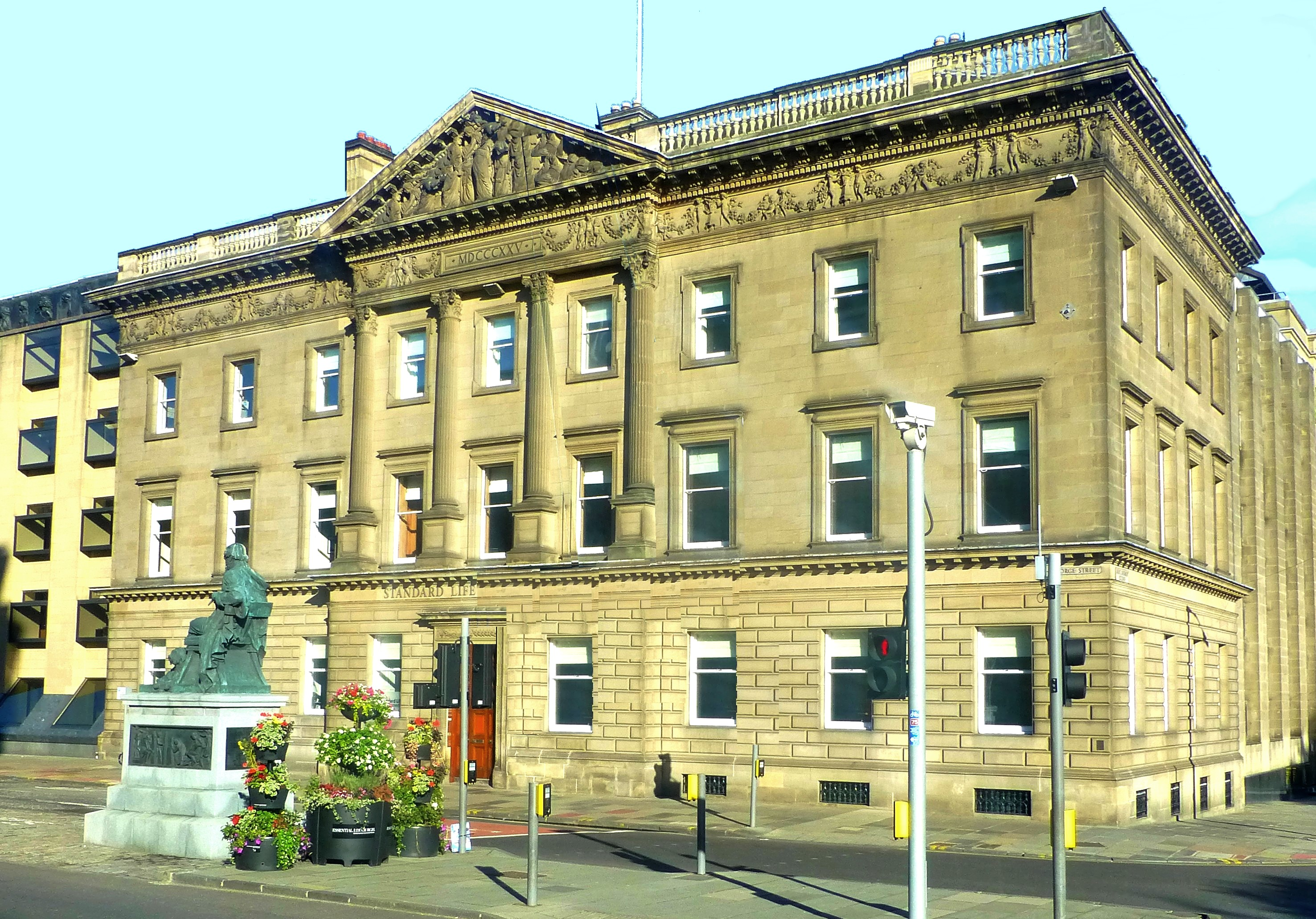
Standard Life Assurance offices, George Street, Edinburgh

Spencer Thomson was born on 16 October 1842, the son of William Thomas Thomson FRSE (1813-1883), manager of the Standard Life Assurance Company, and Christian Anne Seamen, 'above the office' at 3 George Street in central Edinburgh. The family lived at Trinity Grove in north Edinburgh. He was educated at Edinburgh Academy until 1858 then completed his education at Rugby School before studying at Cambridge University from 1861. His parents were then living at 41 Moray Place on the Moray Estate in Edinburgh's West End.

In 1869 he married Georgina Maria Joanna Cockburn, daughter of George Ferguson Cockburn, commander of the British Army at Patna, granddaughter of Henry Cockburn, Lord Cockburn. They had at least five children. In the 1870s he lived at 10 Chester Street, a townhouse in Edinburgh's fashionable West end.

Due to family connections he was President of the Cockburn Association in Edinburgh.

By 1910 he was living at 10 Eglinton Crescent, still in the West End, and in 1919 he married a widow, Helen Gladys Walker (nee Montgomery), granddaughter of Sir William Stewart Walker of Bowland KCB.

== Career ==
He graduated BA in 1865 and immediately joined Standard Life as a clerk (at age 23), although within the year was promoted to actuarial assistant, and then joint-actuary in 1865. He was promoted to assistant manager in 1871, became acting manager in 1874, and when his father retired from Standard Life in 1878, Spencer succeeded him as manager.

In 1870, aged only 28, he was elected a Fellow of the Royal Society of Edinburgh, his proposer being Sir Robert Christison.

Under Spencer Thomson's management, Standard Life expanded to include industry investments, including Barrow Shipbuilding Co., Appleby Iron Co., and Hematite Iron Co, as well as to the Copenhagen-based shipbuilders and engineers, Burmeister & Wain. Additionally, properties were added to Standard Life’s portfolio, despite weaknesses in the property market in the 1870's. Spencer Thomson was keen to foster the company's presence globally, and had influence on the company's overseas presence in Canada, India, China, the West Indies, and began to establish a presence within mainland Europe, with agents appointed in both Belgium and Copenhagen.

From 1890 to 1892 he was President of the Faculty of Advocates.

In 1897 he commissioned the Edinburgh architects George Washington Browne and John More Dick Peddie to wholly remodel the company offices on George Street. This incorporated the pediment of David Bryce's original office of 1839, and the residential flat on the top floor (where he was born).

Spencer Thomson retired in 1904, at the age of 64, and was succeeded as manager by Leonard Walter Dixon.

He died at 3 George Street in Edinburgh (at the flat where he was born) on 11 May 1931.

The interior of his office (and his flat) was destroyed in the remodelling of the office building in 1975.

== Publications ==
- Notes on Mortality in India and Some Other Tropical Countries
