= Aberdeen Asset Management =

Former international investment management group

Aberdeen Asset Management plc
- Company type: Public
- Industry: Investment Management
- Founded: 1983; 43 years ago
- Fate: Merged into Standard Life Aberdeen
- Headquarters: Aberdeen, Scotland, UK
- Key people: Simon Troughton (chairman); Martin Gilbert (CEO); Hugh Young (Head of Investments); Bev Hendry (Chief Executive – Head of Americas)
- Products: Equities, Fixed Income and Property asset classes
- Revenue: ▼£1,114 million (2016)
- Operating income: ▼£328.1 million (2016)
- Net income: ▼£189.2 million (2016)
- AUM: ▲£312.1 billion (2016)
- Number of employees: 2,812 (2016)
- Parent: Aberdeen Group
- Subsidiaries: Parmenion Capital Partners LLC
- Website: www.aberdeenstandard.com

Aberdeen Asset Management plc was an international investment management group, managing assets for both institutions and private investors from offices around the world. Its head office was in Aberdeen, Scotland. The company was listed on the London Stock Exchange until 14 August 2017 when, as a result of a merger with Standard Life, it became a subsidiary of the renamed Standard Life Aberdeen.

== History ==
The company was established in 1983 through a management buy-out of an investment trust. It was then listed on the London Stock Exchange in 1991. In recent years, it has seen significant growth from acquisitions. In 2000 it acquired Murray Johnstone, followed by Edinburgh Fund Managers in 2003, parts of Deutsche Asset Management in 2005 and 2007, Glasgow Investment Managers in 2007, Goodman Property Investors in 2008, certain investment businesses of Credit Suisse Asset Management in 2009, and certain contracts and assets from RBS Asset Management in 2010.

In November 2013, Lloyds Banking Group sold Scottish Widows Investment Partnership (SWIP) to Aberdeen Asset Management in a £660m deal. The deal made Aberdeen Asset Management the second largest listed fund manager in Europe after Schroders, currently managing £308.1bn In May 2015, the firm agreed to acquire its US counterpart Flag Capital Management for an undisclosed deal that would double the private equity assets under the company's control.

The Company sponsored The Boat Race between 1999 and 2001. In 2010 it signed a four-year sponsorship agreement with the Dad Vail Regatta to be title sponsor until 2013, the event's 75th Anniversary. The agreement has helped to keep the famous college rowing regatta in Philadelphia, the Group's North American headquarters. In March 2012 it took over sponsorship of golf's Scottish Open for the following three years. Other sponsorships include the Cowes Week sailing regatta, Aberdeen Brunei Senior Masters Golf Tournament, Edinburgh Rugby club, professional golfers Colin Montgomerie and Paul Lawrie, and former Formula One driver Paul di Resta.

In March 2017, Aberdeen Asset Management reached an agreement to merge with Standard Life, in an all-share merger. Standard Life changed its name to Standard Life Aberdeen on 14 August 2017.

In November 2022, Aberdeen Asset Management, along with South Africa's Public Investment Corporation (PIC), announced that they would be selling the remaining controlling shares of major South African retail firm Massmart to Bentonville, Arkansas-based retailer Walmart in an all-cash transaction valued at approximately $377.6 million.

== Operations ==
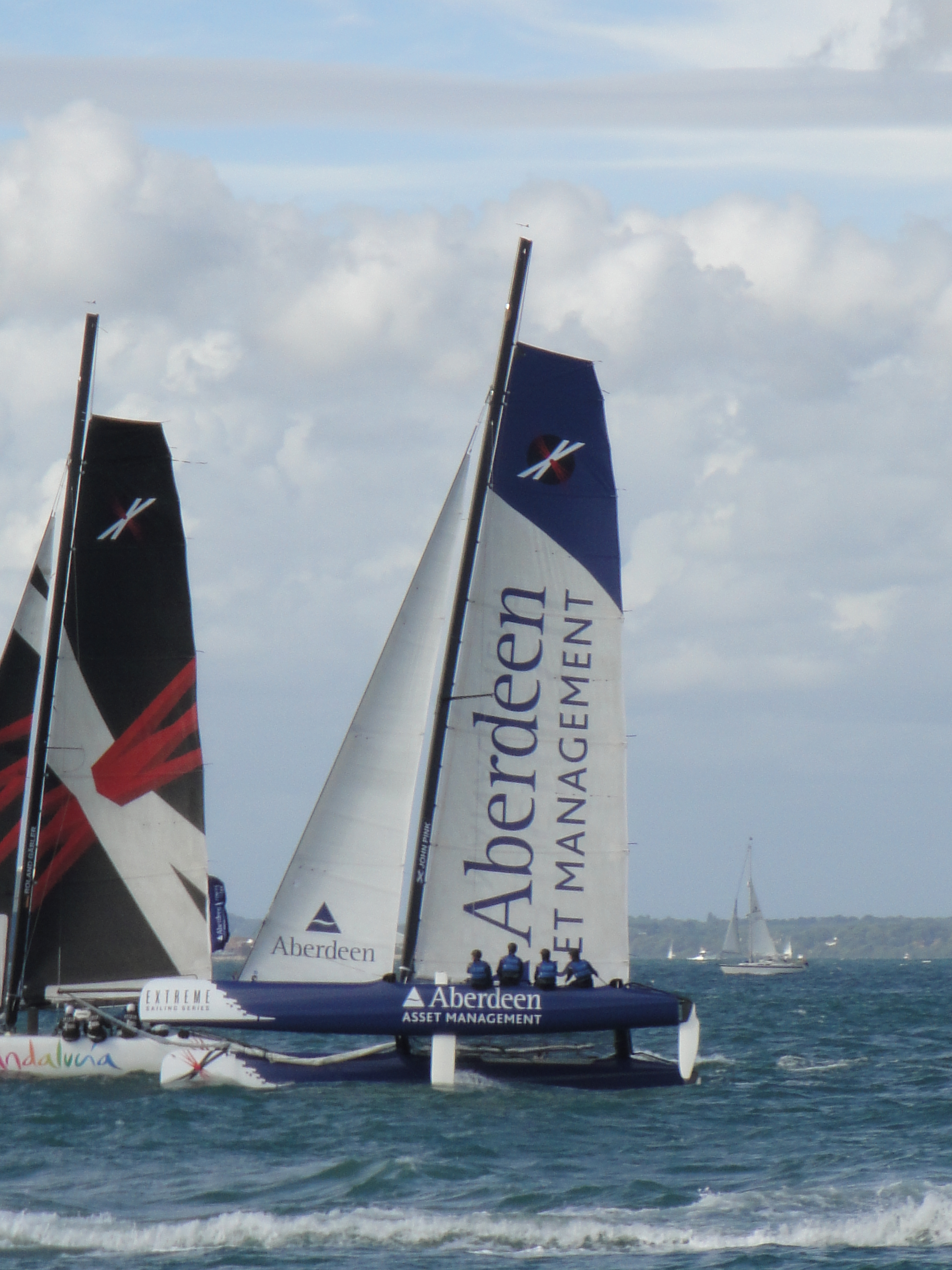
An Extreme 40 class sailing catamaran, seen racing off Egypt Point, Cowes, Isle of Wight

The company operated mainly in the United Kingdom but had a growing presence worldwide, particularly Asia, Oceania and the Americas, with over 2,500 staff, across 37 offices in 25 countries. Its headquarters were in the city of Aberdeen, where Group functions including legal, group information and human resources were located, and it had its major investment desks in London, Philadelphia and Singapore.
