= Aberdeen Group =

UK based wealth and investments company

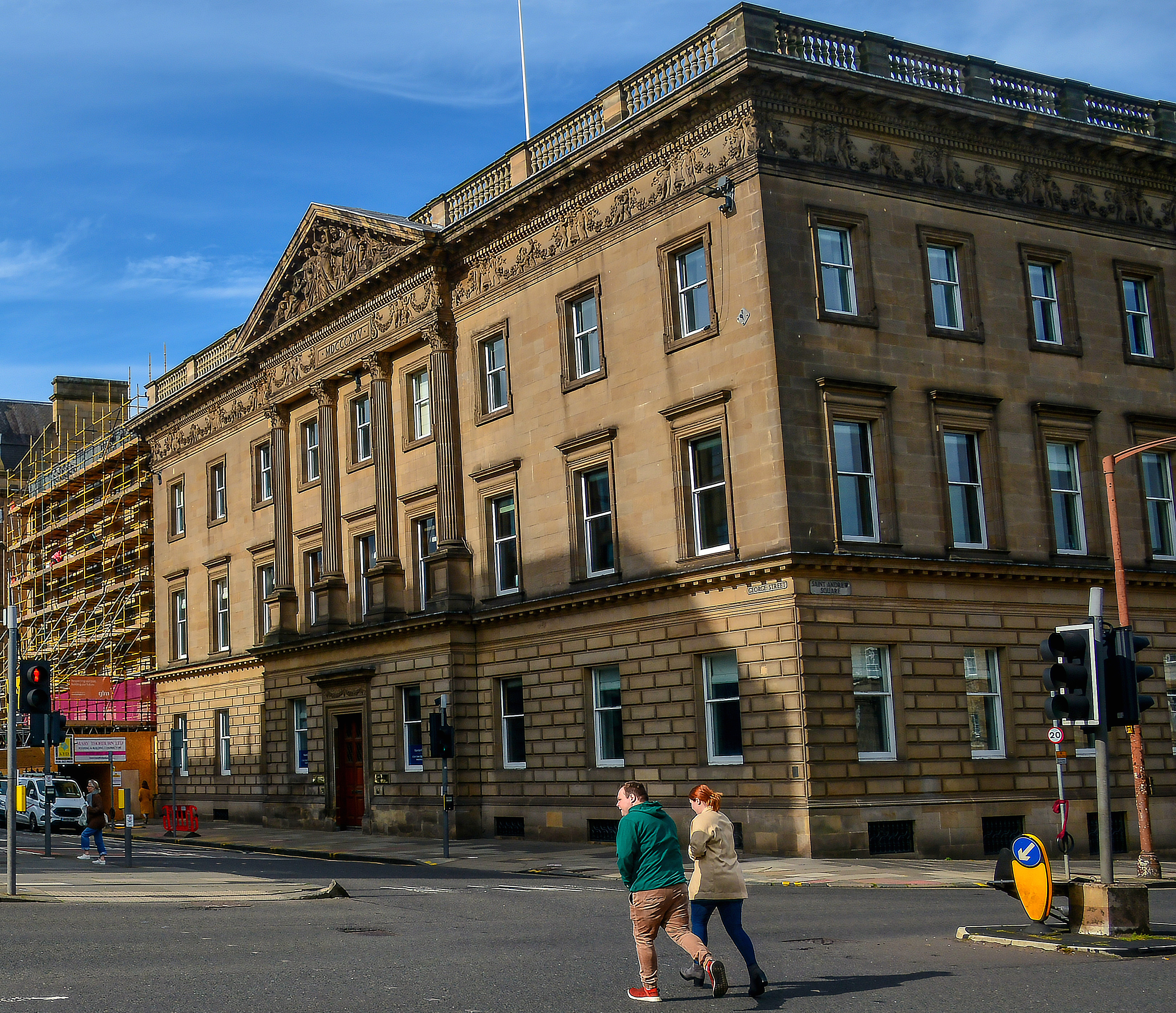
- Headquarters at 1 George Street, Edinburgh
- Trade name: Aberdeen
- Formerly: Standard Life Aberdeen plc (2017–2021); abrdn plc (2021–2025)
- Type: Public
- Traded as: LSE: ABDN; FTSE 100 Component
- ISIN: GB00BF8Q6K64
- Industry: Financial services
- Predecessors: Standard Life (founded 1825); Aberdeen Asset Management (founded 1983)
- Founded: 1825; 201 years ago
- Headquarters: Edinburgh, Scotland, UK
- Key people: Sir Douglas Flint (chair); Jason Windsor (CEO)
- Revenue: ▼£1,341 million (2025)
- Operating income: ▲£466 million (2025)
- Net income: ▲£398 million (2025)
- AUM: ▲£390.4 billion (2025)
- Number of employees: 4,000 (2025)
- Subsidiaries: Interactive Investor
- Website: aberdeenplc.com

Aberdeen Group plc, trading as Aberdeen, is a United Kingdom-based wealth and investment company headquartered in Edinburgh, Scotland. It is listed on the London Stock Exchange and is a constituent of the FTSE 100 Index. The registered office of the company is at George Street, Edinburgh.

The company changed its trading identity from abrdn to Aberdeen on 4 March 2025, and its name from abrdn plc to Aberdeen Group plc on 13 March 2025.

== History ==
In March 2017, Standard Life reached an agreement to merge with Aberdeen Asset Management, in an all-share merger, subject to shareholder approval. The merged company was named Standard Life Aberdeen.

In May 2017, Standard Life acquired the loss-making AXA Portfolio Services for £31 million. This company housed AXA Elevate, the investment platform from Axa. At the time of acquisition the platform held £9.8 billion of client assets, boosting the total level of assets held on Standard Life platforms to £36.4 billion.

In October 2017, it was reported that there had been withdrawals of $10 billion from Standard Life Aberdeen's mutual funds over the prior year.

In February 2018, Standard Life Aberdeen initiated the sale of the Standard Life insurance business to Phoenix Group for £3.2 billion, marking a transition away from its insurance roots to asset management. In April 2018, Aberdeen Standard Investments announced the acquisition of ETF Securities' US exchange-traded funds ('ETF') business in an effort to build a presence in the US ETF market.

Sir Gerry Grimstone stepped down as chairman on 1 January 2019 and was succeeded by Sir Douglas Flint.

Keith Skeoch stood down as chief executive and was succeeded by Stephen Bird in September 2020.

In September 2020 it initiated the acquisition of a 60% interest in Tritax, one of Europe's leading logistics real estate fund managers.

In April 2021, having sold the Standard Life Insurance business to Phoenix Group in 2018 and having sold the Standard Life name to Phoenix Group in 2021, the company rebranded as abrdn. The new brand, pronounced "Aberdeen" and developed by the branding agency Wolff Olins, was criticised as difficult to pronounce. The change of name and the rebranding took place in July 2021. The name was received with widespread criticism and was the subject of online jokes. An online poll of investors described the rebrand as an "act of corporate insanity".

In July 2021, the company sold Parmenion, an investment and technology solutions business that supports financial advice firms, to Preservation Capital Partners.

In May 2022, Aberdeen acquired Interactive Investor, a British subscription-based retail investment services company with over 400,000 customers for £1.49 billion.

In June 2023, the company restructured its financial planning arm, splitting into two models – the 'financial consultant' model and the 'regional advice' model.

In January 2024, it was widely reported that Aberdeen were to cut around 10% of its workforce of 5,000 people as part of a £150M restructuring plan. On 24 January 2024, the plans to cut around 500 jobs were confirmed.

In April 2024, Aberdeen completed the sale of its European-headquartered private equity business (with £7.4bn assets under management) to Nasdaq-listed Patria Investments for up to £100m. The sale followed the sale of its US-headquartered private equity business to High Vista Strategies in 2023.

In May 2024, Stephen Bird stood down as CEO and Jason Windsor, the then CFO, was appointed as interim group CEO, and formally appointed to the role in September of that year.

On 4 March 2025, the company changed its trading identity to "Aberdeen", after its 2021 rebrand to "abrdn" faced criticism. The company also initiated a search for a new chair as Douglas Flint prepared to step down. On 13 March 2025, the company changed its name to "Aberdeen Group plc".

In December 2025, it was announced that Aberdeen Investments would assume management of nine closed-ended funds worth approximately £1.5 billion from US-based MFS Investment Management. The transaction involves merging the MFS funds and one existing Aberdeen fund into two larger closed-ended funds focused on municipal bonds and multi-sector fixed income assets, subject to shareholder approval.

== See also ==
- List of managers of Standard Life Aberdeen
