= Standard Life =

UK based investment company

Standard Life Assurance Limited
- Company type: Subsidiary
- Industry: Financial services
- Founded: 1825; 201 years ago
- Headquarters: Edinburgh, Scotland, UK
- Number of employees: 6,431 (2015)
- Parent: Standard Life plc
- Website: standardlife.co.uk

Standard Life is a life assurance, pensions and long-term savings company operating in the United Kingdom. It is owned by Standard Life plc.

== History ==
=== 1825–2010 ===
Standard Life Assurance Company's Act 1925
- Act of Parliament
- Parliament of the United Kingdom
- Long title: An Act to re-incorporate the Standard Life Assurance Company to provide for the control and management of the Company as a mutual company and for the conversion of its share capital into perpetual stock to confer further powers on the Company to repeal existing Acts and for other purposes.
- Citation: 15 & 16 Geo. 5. c. xlii

Dates
- Royal assent: 31 July 1925

Other legislation
- Repealed by: Standard Life Assurance Company Act 1991

Status: Repealed

The Standard Life Assurance Company was established in 1825 and reincorporated as a mutual assurance company in 1925. During the 19th century it opened offices in Canada, India, China and Uruguay.

In 2006 demutualisation took place and the company was floated on the London Stock Exchange. The company sold Standard Life Bank plc to Barclays plc in January 2010 and then acquired the remaining 75 per cent stake in Threesixty, a financial advisory support business, that it did not already own for an undisclosed sum in March 2010. It sold its healthcare division to Discovery Holdings, a South African business, in May 2010 and went on to buy Focus Solutions Group, a financial software company, for £42m in December 2010.

=== 2011–2015 ===
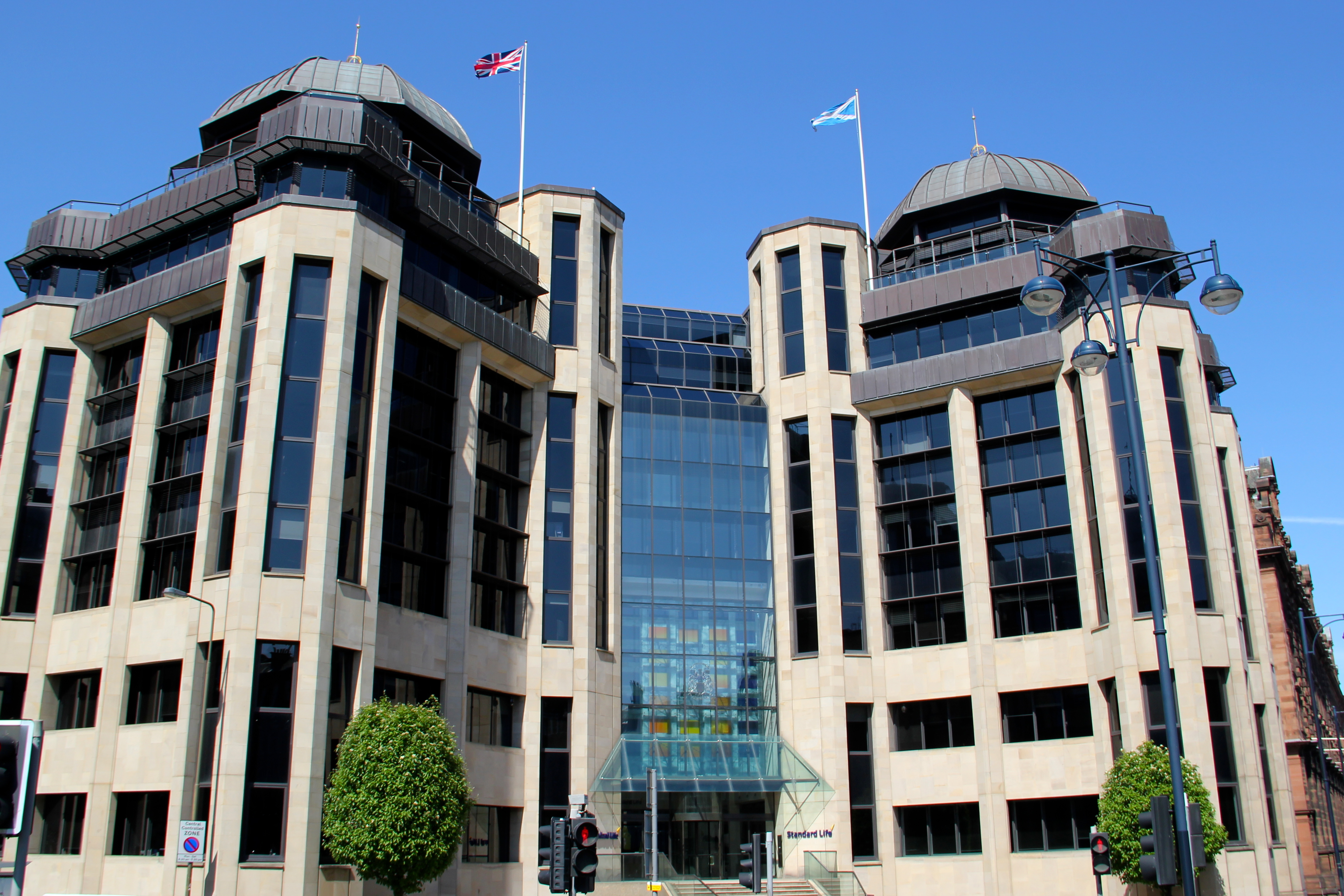
Head office building located in Edinburgh, Scotland

In February 2013, the company acquired the private client division of Newton Management Limited, a UK wealth management unit of BNY Mellon, in a deal worth up to £83.5 million. In March 2014, it was announced that Standard Life was in advanced talks to purchase rival Phoenix Group Holdings' Ignis Asset Management for around £400 million. Towards the end of the month, Standard Life completed the acquisition for a fee of £390 million.

In September 2014, Standard Life agreed to sell its Canadian operations to The Manufacturers Life Insurance Company, a subsidiary of Manulife Financial Corporation. It completed this sale on 30 January 2015 for a cash consideration of C$4.0bn. The transaction included a Global Collaboration Agreement where Manulife will seek to distribute Standard Life Investments' funds in Canada, the US and Asia. In a round-up of 2014 business, pre-tax profits rose by 19% to £604m, fee-based revenue during the year grew 14% to 1.43bn, and over 340,000 auto-enrolment customers were added. The pay and bonus of Chief Executive, David Nish, rose by 23% to almost £5.5m.

In February 2015, Standard Life announced it was launching a wholly owned, UK financial advice business. In doing so, it confirmed that it had entered into an agreement with Skipton Building Society to purchase Pearson Jones, a firm of financial advisers and paraplanners, and this acquisition was completed in May 2015 when the name of its new financial advice business was announced as "1825" – a reference to the year Standard Life was founded.

=== 2016–2017 ===
In July 2016, a property investment fund managed by Standard Life Investments froze withdrawals after experiencing liquidity issues.

In March 2017, Standard Life reached an agreement to merge with Aberdeen Asset Management, in an all-share merger, subject to shareholder approval. It was announced that the merged company was to be named Standard Life Aberdeen. This was achieved by Standard Life being renamed Standard Life Aberdeen on 14 August 2017.

=== 2018–present ===
In 2018, Phoenix Group Holdings plc acquired Standard Life from Standard Life Aberdeen plc for £2.9 billion.

In May 2021, Phoenix Group acquired the 'Standard Life' brand and in July 2021 Aberdeen Standard Life Group companies rebranded as ‘abrdn’.

Phoenix Group Holdings plc became Standard Life plc in March 2026, thereby adopting the name of its most recognisable brand.

== Controversy ==
In January 2007, the head of Standard Life's life and pensions business, Trevor Matthews, used the racist phrase "nigger in the woodpile" while giving a presentation at one of the company's Edinburgh offices. After issuing an apology, Mr Matthews remained in his job and no disciplinary action was taken.

In March 2007 the company announced it would cut 1,000 jobs in an attempt to save an additional £100 million per year in costs. One month later it was highlighted in the company's annual report that three of Standard Life's top executives (Sandy Crombie, Keith Skeoch and Trevor Matthews) were awarded more than £5 million in pay. A Standard Life spokesman defended the awards, citing the leadership's efforts in turning around the company's fortunes.

In February 2014, Standard Life announced that it may move parts of their operations outside Scotland in the event of Scottish independence, if it was necessary to do so.

== See also ==
- List of managers of Standard Life
