= Sir Richard Pease, 4th Baronet =

British fund manager (born 1958)

Sir Richard Pease Bt
- Born: Richard Peter Pease; 4 September 1958 (age 68)
- Citizenship: United Kingdom
- Education: Eton College; Durham University
- Occupation: Fund manager
- Employer(s): New Star Asset Management (2001–2009); Henderson Group plc (2009–2014); Crux Asset Management (2014–2023)
- Spouse: Victoria Pease
- Children: 5
- Father: Sir Richard Pease, 3rd Baronet
- Relatives: Nichola Pease (sister)

Sir Richard Peter Pease, 4th Baronet (born September 1958) is a British investment manager. A specialist in the European equities market, he formerly ran the European Special Situations fund for three different fund management firms, including Crux Asset Management, which he founded in 2014.

== Early life and education ==
Pease was born in September 1958. He is the only son of Sir Richard Pease, 3rd Baronet. He has a sister, Nichola, who has also worked in asset management, and is the wife of another financier, Crispin Odey.

He was educated at Eton, followed by a bachelor's degree in general arts from Durham University.

== Career ==
In 1979 Pease began working for the Central Board of Finance for the Church of England, having secured this role through his uncle. He later joined Windsor Investment Management and moved to Jupiter Asset Management in June 1989. He launched his first fund two years later, the Jupiter European fund, after convincing John Duffield to start a European desk. He followed Duffield to New Star Asset Management in 2001, where he ran the flagship European Special Situations fund from its launch. He continued in this role after the 2009 acquisition of New Star by Henderson Group plc.

=== Crux Asset Management ===
Pease left Henderson to launch Crux Asset Management in October 2014, in what was described as a "high-profile departure".As part of the move he took the £1.2 billion Henderson European Special Situations fund with him, which merged with another Crux fund a year later to form the Crux European Special Situations Fund.

In February 2016, it was reported that Pease was suing Henderson Global Investors for £2.7 million in respect of unpaid income for the 2012 to 2014 period. He won the case in April 2018.

The Crux European Special Situations Fund was highly successful for a period of time, and surged ahead of the Euro Stoxx index. However, the fund suffered "lacklustre" returns in the wake of the COVID-19 pandemic, prompting Hargreaves Lansdown to remove the fund from its shortlist of recommended buys in September 2022.

Pease retired in 2023 after Crux Asset Management was acquired by Lansdowne Partners for an undisclosed fee. In 2025 it was reported he had been hired for an advisory role by Rockwood Asset Management.

=== Investment style ===
Regarding his investment philosophy, Pease has been called the "European equivalent" of Neil Woodford. His niche as an investor was identifying "under-researched" European mid-cap stocks.

== Personal life ==
Pease is married to Victoria "Vita" Pease, a former financial trader who published a novel, Playing FTSE, under the pen-name Penelope Jacobs. As of 2016, they resided in Kensington and have two sons and a daughter, and two older sons from his first marriage.

Pease bought the 10-bedroom 17th-century Newland House in Newland, Gloucestershire, in 2011, and was renovating it, when it was "completely gutted" by fire in April 2012.

== See also ==
- List of alumni of Hatfield College, Durham
- List of Old Etonians born in the 20th century

Baronetage of the United Kingdom
Preceded by Richard Pease	Baronet (of Hammersknott); 2021–present	Incumbent
