= Hugh Hendry =

Scottish businessman and podcaster (born 1969)

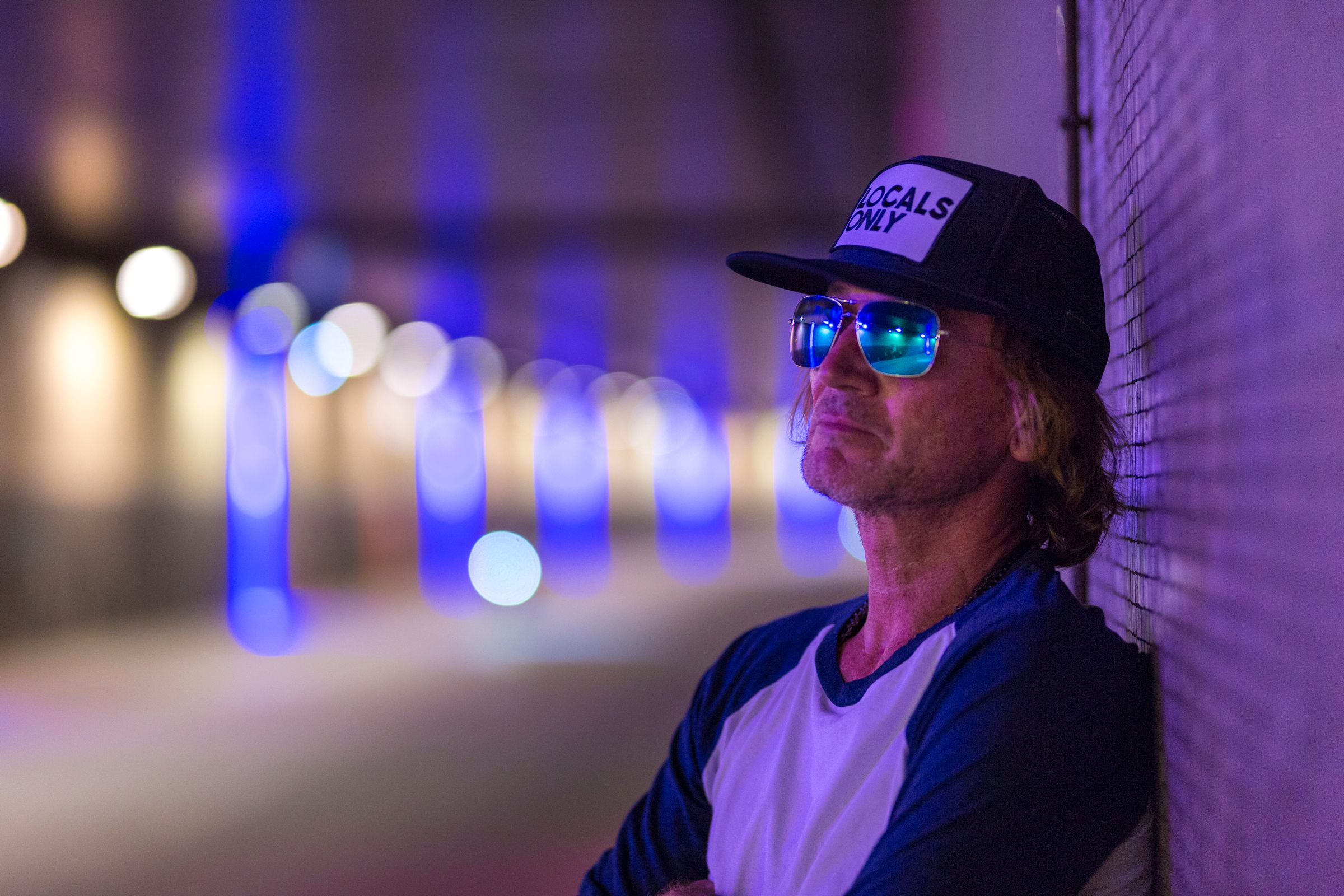
- Hugh Hendry in Paris, June 2020.
- Born: 16 March 1969 (age 57); Glasgow, Scotland
- Education: Strathclyde University
- Occupations: Hedge fund manager and podcaster

Hugh Hendry (born 16 March 1969) is a Scottish hedge fund manager and podcaster.

He was the founding partner and chief investment officer of the now defunct hedge fund firm, Eclectica Asset Management. Despite returning 50 per cent in his fund's first calendar year, from the revival in the gold price back in 2003, it was not until 5 years later that he began to attract media attention when his fund achieved a 31.2% positive return in 2008, despite the 2008 financial crisis, earning him a reputation as a contrarian investor. Hendry has been referred to as "the most high-profile Scot" in the hedge fund sector.

== Background and career ==
Hendry was born in Glasgow, Scotland, in 1969; he grew up in the city's Castlemilk district and graduated from Strathclyde University in 1990 with a BA in economics and finance.

In 1991, Hendry joined the Edinburgh investment management firm, Baillie Gifford. He has been highly critical of EU regulatory policy.

After Baillie Gifford, Hendry worked briefly for Credit Suisse Asset Management. Following a chance meeting with Crispin Odey, Hendry joined Odey Asset Management in 1999. "It was a meeting of minds," Hendry said. "He checked my references, got the message that I was a troublemaker, and said, 'You're one of us, you're one of the pirates'."

He learned the art of "momentum investing" and was responsible for managing a range of funds from the Eclectica Fund to more than a $1 billion of long-only European mandates, including the award-winning Odey Continental European Fund. "(Odey) taught me how to manage money," Hendry said. "More than that, he taught me how to misbehave. Misbehaviour is all about curiosity, how you invoke and think about change, which is very necessary in the management of money."

Hendry once said to an interviewer: "To my mind, the three most important principles when it comes to investing are Albert Camus's principles of ethics: God is dead, life is absurd and there are no rules." He suggested that a great fund manager was defined by "an ability to establish a contentious premise outside the existing belief system, and have it go on and be adopted by the rest of the financial community".

=== Eclectica Asset Management ===
Eclectica Asset Management was founded in 2005 when Hendry and another ex-Odey partner purchased the management contract of the Eclectica Fund from Crispin Odey to establish themselves as a stand-alone fund manager group. "A lot of people define investors as value or growth. We are neither. We are time investors," Hendry said at the time.

Despite his reputation as a contrarian, Hendry explained to the Financial Times in July 2012 that his approach continued to be based in taking advantage of market momentum. "Our ideas are harshly disciplined by market trends. You will never see us pursue a homegrown idea when it is to the detriment of the prevailing trend," he said.

The hedge fund announced its closure in late 2017.

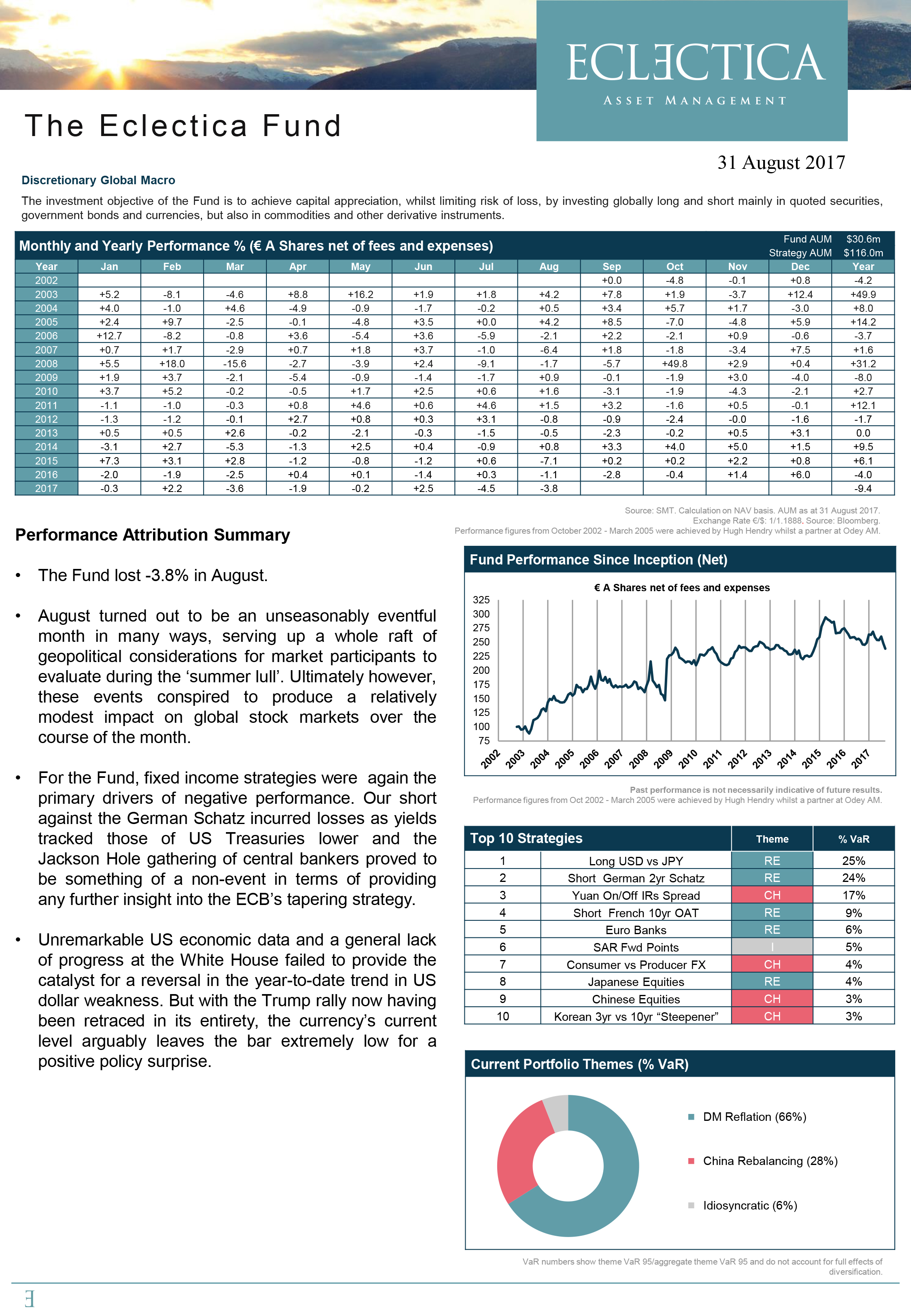
Eclectica Fund Performance Summary

== Media appearances ==
Hendry has become known in the United Kingdom for his outspoken commentary on the 2008 financial crisis. On an episode of the BBC's Newsnight programme aired on 9 April 2010, Hendry began his response to comments by the Nobel Prize–winning economist Joseph Stiglitz on the financial position of Greece by saying, "Erm, hello. Can I tell you about the real world?" On the same programme in May 2010, Hendry responded to a question from host Jeremy Paxman about the current European economic situation and the possibility of a Greek sovereign debt default with the comment, "I would recommend you panic". An outspoken appearance on the BBC's Question Time followed in October 2010.

At the LSE Alternative Investments Conference in 2011, during a discussion with Steven Drobny, Hendry joked that his clients have banned him from further media appearances. Hendry is the anonymous 'Plasticine Man' in Drobny's book on hedge fund managers 'Invisible Hands: Top Hedge Fund Traders on Bubbles, Crashes, and Real Money'.
