= Richard Pease =

Richard Pease may refer to:

- Sir Richard Pease, 4th Baronet (born 1958), British fund manager
- Sir Richard Pease, 3rd Baronet (1922–2021), British banker
