= Eastbach Court =

Mansion in English Bicknor, England

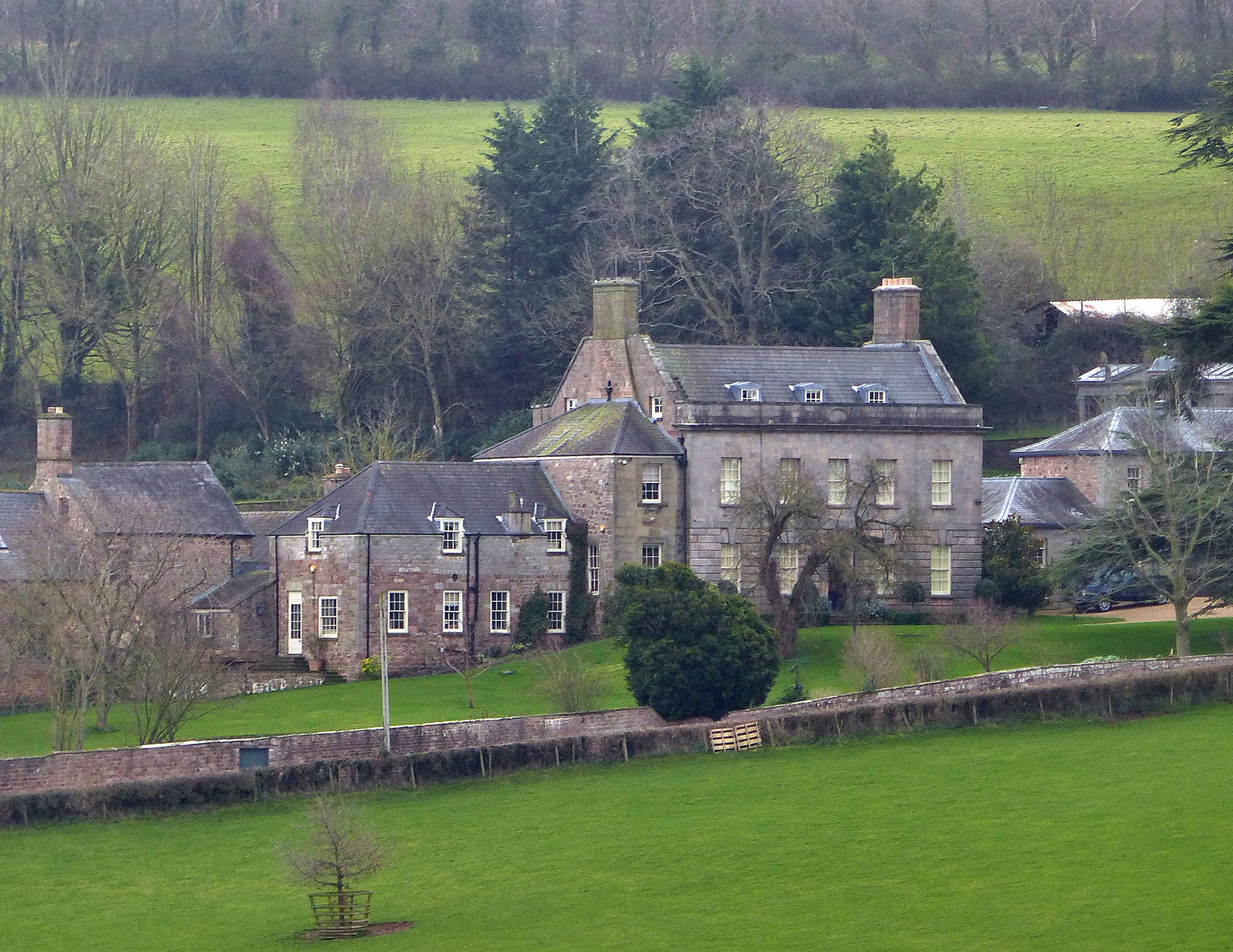
- Eastbach Court

- Location in Gloucestershire
- 51°50′01″N 2°35′56″W
- Location: English Bicknor, Gloucestershire

Listed Building – Grade II
- Official name: Eastbach Court
- Designated: 12 December 1953
- Reference no.: 1186313

Eastbach Court is a historic Grade II listed mansion in English Bicknor, Gloucestershire, England.

== History ==
The house was built on a former messuage owned by Alexander Baynham as early as 1524. It was built with ashlar in the 17th and 18th centuries, with an extension in the 19th century.

Sir Robert Woodruff lived there in 1608. By 1633, George Wyrall, Edward Machen's brother-in-law, was the owner. The house stayed in the Machen family until 1883.

Eastbach Court was acquired in 1987 by Lord Rowe-Beddoe and his wife, who undertook restoration. The main house has a Cuban mahogany cantilevered staircase and an arch designed by Batty Langley.

The current owners are the hedge fund managers Crispin Odey and his wife, Nichola Pease.

== Architectural significance ==
It has been listed as Grade II by English Heritage since 12 December 1953.

== Owners and residents ==
Sir Alexander Baynham who died in 1524 owned a messuage (dwelling house) on the site of the Eastbach Court so the building dates back to the early 1500s. It passed through the Baynham family until it came to Robert Baynham (1542–1572). He died in 1572 and left his wife Mary some of his property. She married Sir Robert Woodruff (1547–1609) and Eastbach Court became his in right of his wife. After she died in 1610 it reverted to the Baynham family.

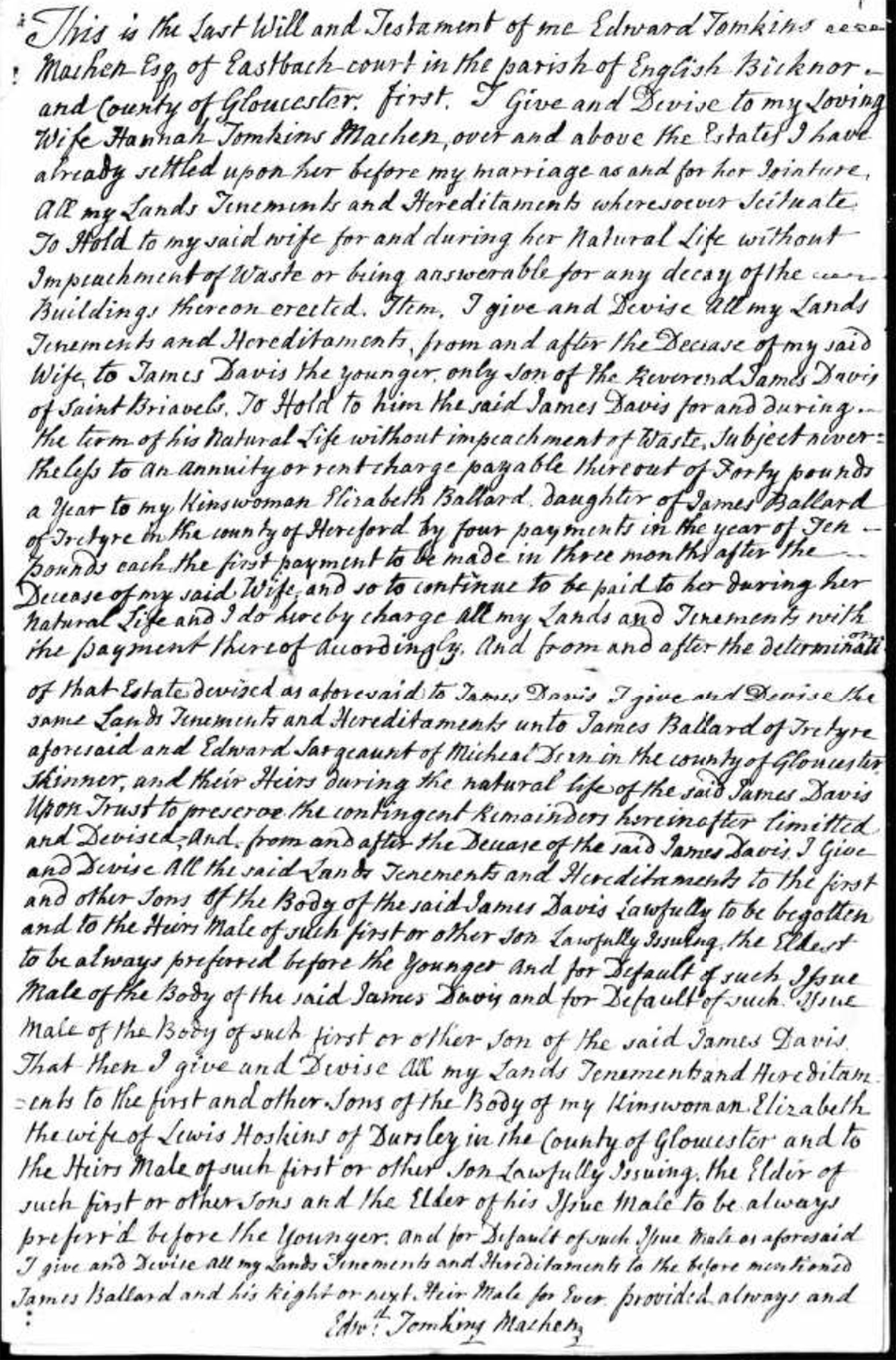
Will of Edward Tomkins Machen (1706–1772)

In 1616 Alexander Baynham sold the property to Edward Machen of Gloucestershire. It passed through the Machen family until it came to Edward Tomkins Machen (1706–1778) who was born Edward Tomkins but took the additional name of Machen when he inherited the Eastbach Estate. In about 1763 he made major alterations to the existing building. In 1772 he married Hannah Dew (1712–1779) but the couple had no children. When he died in 1778 he stated in his will (which is shown) that the house would be inherited by his wife Hannah and after her death would go to his relative James Davies. Hannah died in 1779 so James Davies became the owner of Eastbach Court in that year.

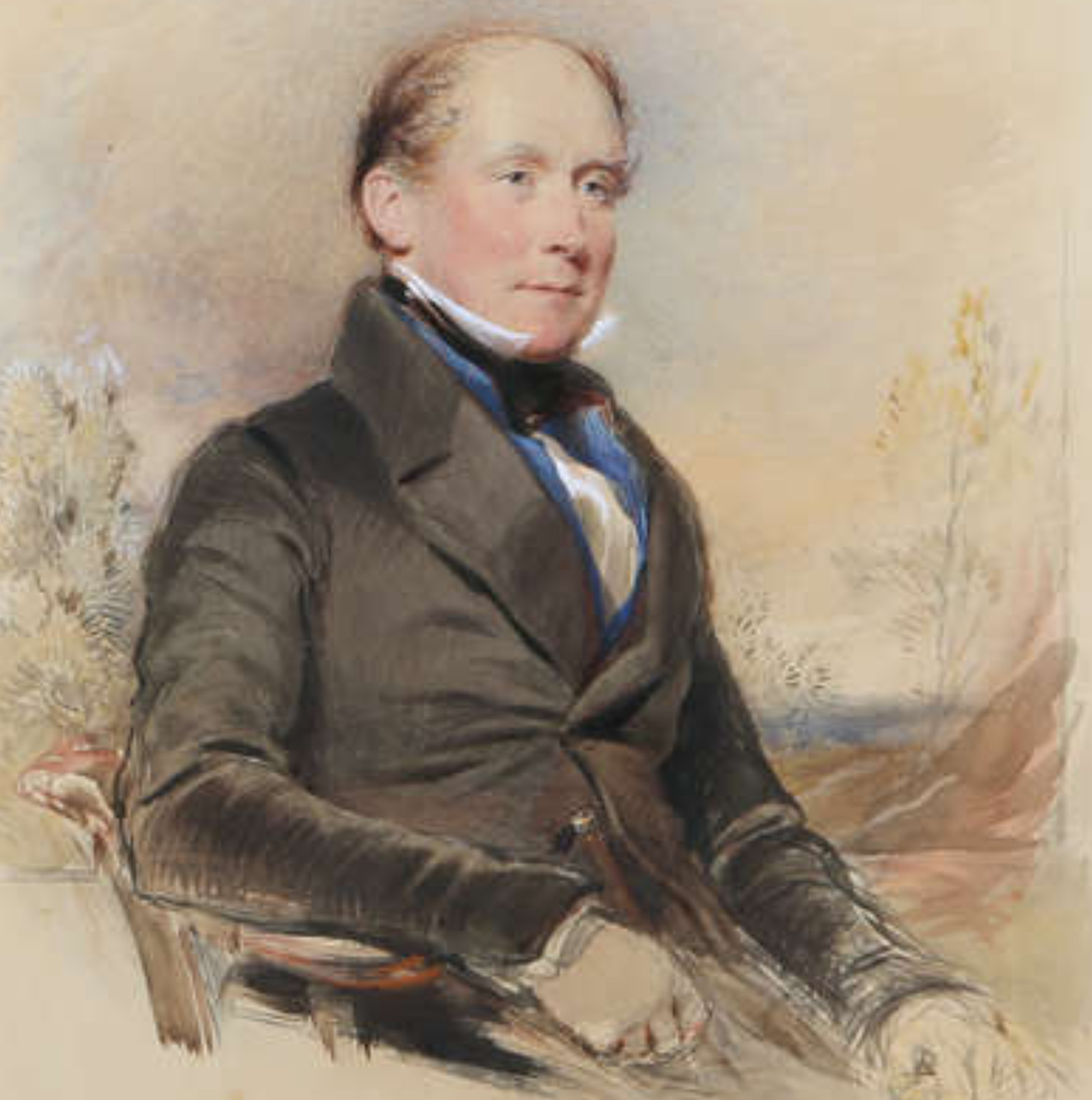
Edward Machen (1783–1862), Deputy Surveyor of the Forest of Dean

James Davies, who took the surname Machen under the terms of Edward's will owned over 453 acres in the parish in 1792. In 1781 he married Lucy Dighton who was the daughter of John Dighton of [Ascot, Berkshire]. He was deputy surveyor of the Forest of Dean in 1806. At his death in 1832 his son Edward Machen became the owner.

Edward Machen (1783–1862) was the most famous owner of Eastbach Court. He was deputy surveyor of the Forest of Dean for 46 years from 1808 until 1854 which was the longest term of office served by anyone in the position. According to the Foresters Forest Heritage Fund he “had a significant impact upon the landscape structure of the Forest that we know today”. Kevin Stannard, Forestry England, and the Forests’ current Deputy Surveyor, said:

"Edward Machen was the first of what I'd term the modern Deputy Surveyors, his work had a profound impact and still impacts woodland management and our forest heritage today. As the current Deputy Surveyor, I am proud to be carrying forward much of Ed's legacy."

He was born Edward Tomkins Davies but changed his name to Machen (the same as his father James's adopted name) in 1816 when he married his cousin Sophia Dighton (1796–1825).

He was born Edward Tomkins Davies but changed his name to Machen (the same as his father James's adopted name) in 1816 when he married his cousin Sophia Dighton (1796–1825). The couple had five children. Unfortunately his wife Sophia died in childbirth in 1825.

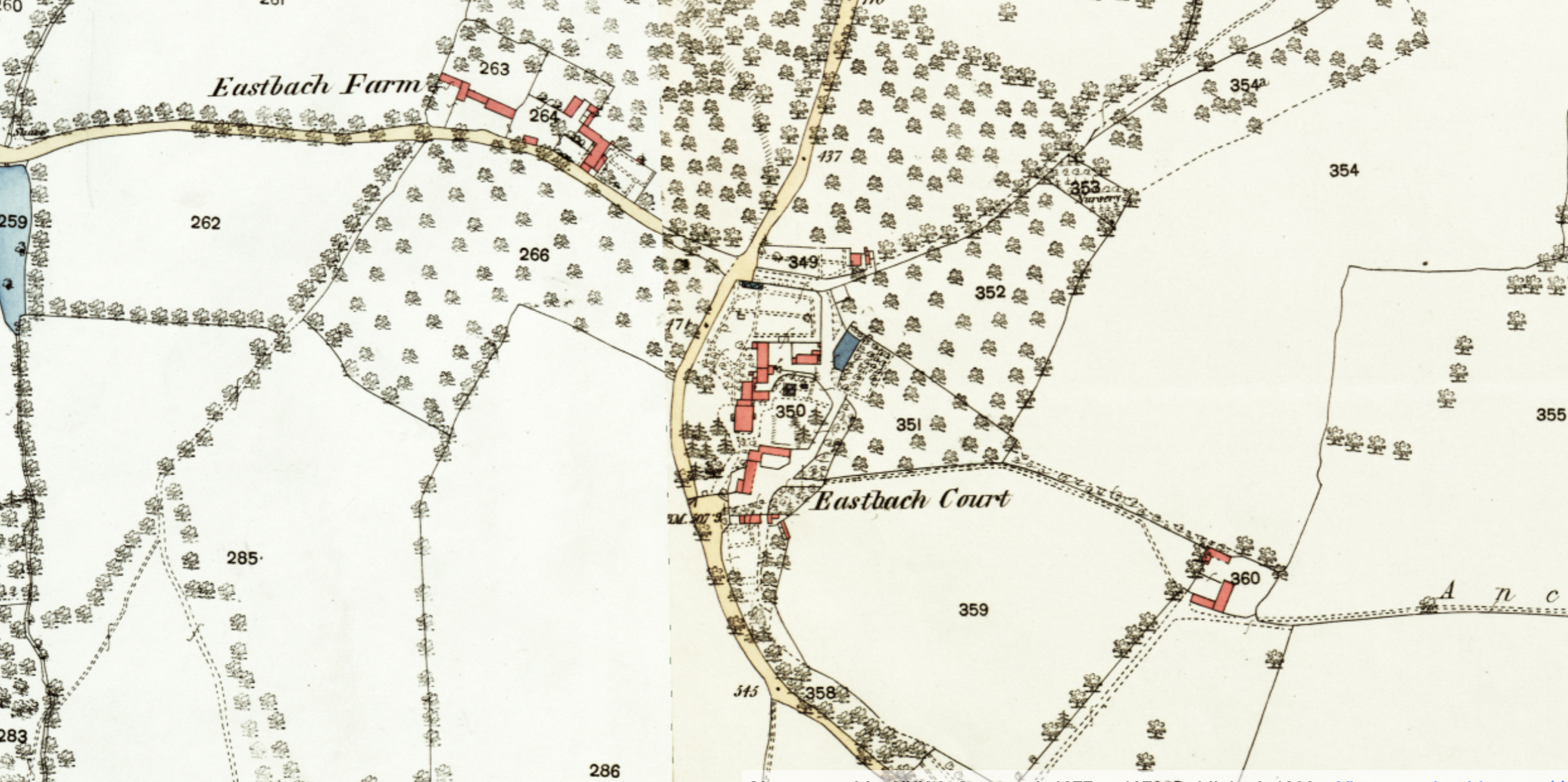
Map Eastbach Court 1880

He continued his work as Deputy Surveyor in the Forest of Dean and his achievements are well documented. The 1858 book The Forest of Dean contains numerous references to his work. Another book The personalities of the Forest of Dean contains a whole chapter on Edward. Its opening paragraph reads:

"Edward Machen esq. whose long and most efficient attention to the interests of the Crown secured such universal respect as to entitle him to the epithet 'The Man of the Forest'"

Edward died in 1862 and his son Reverend Edward Machen (1817–1893) became the owner of the house. He was the rector of Staunton and therefore did not live there until his retirement. From 1862 until 1874 it was rented to Mary Bathurst (1791–1874), the widow of Charles Bathurst of Lydney Park, Gloucestershire. After her death in 1874 the Reverend Edward Machen returned to live at the Court with his wife Sophia. They both died in 1893 and his son Charles Edward Machen (1850–1917) became the owner. From 1893 until 1958 when the Muchen family sold the property, the house was rented to wealthy tenants.
