= Baillie Gifford European Growth Trust =

- Type: Public
- Traded as: LSE: BGEU
- Industry: Investment management
- Founded: 1972
- Headquarters: Edinburgh, Scotland, UK
- Key people: Joe Faraday, Manager
- Parent: Baillie Gifford & Co Limited
- Website: www.bailliegifford.com/en/uk/individual-investors/funds/baillie-gifford-european-growth-trust/

Baillie Gifford European Growth Trust is a large British investment trust dedicated to investments in companies operating in Continental Europe.

== History ==
The company was established by F&C Asset Management as the Foreign & Colonial Eurotrust in 1972. After Edinburgh Partners became the managers, it changed its name to the European Investment Trust in 2010.

In 2019 a review of management led to the appointment of Baillie Gifford, and the trust was renamed as Baillie Gifford European Growth Trust.
