= LSE Alternative Investment Conference =

LSE SU Alternative Investments Conference
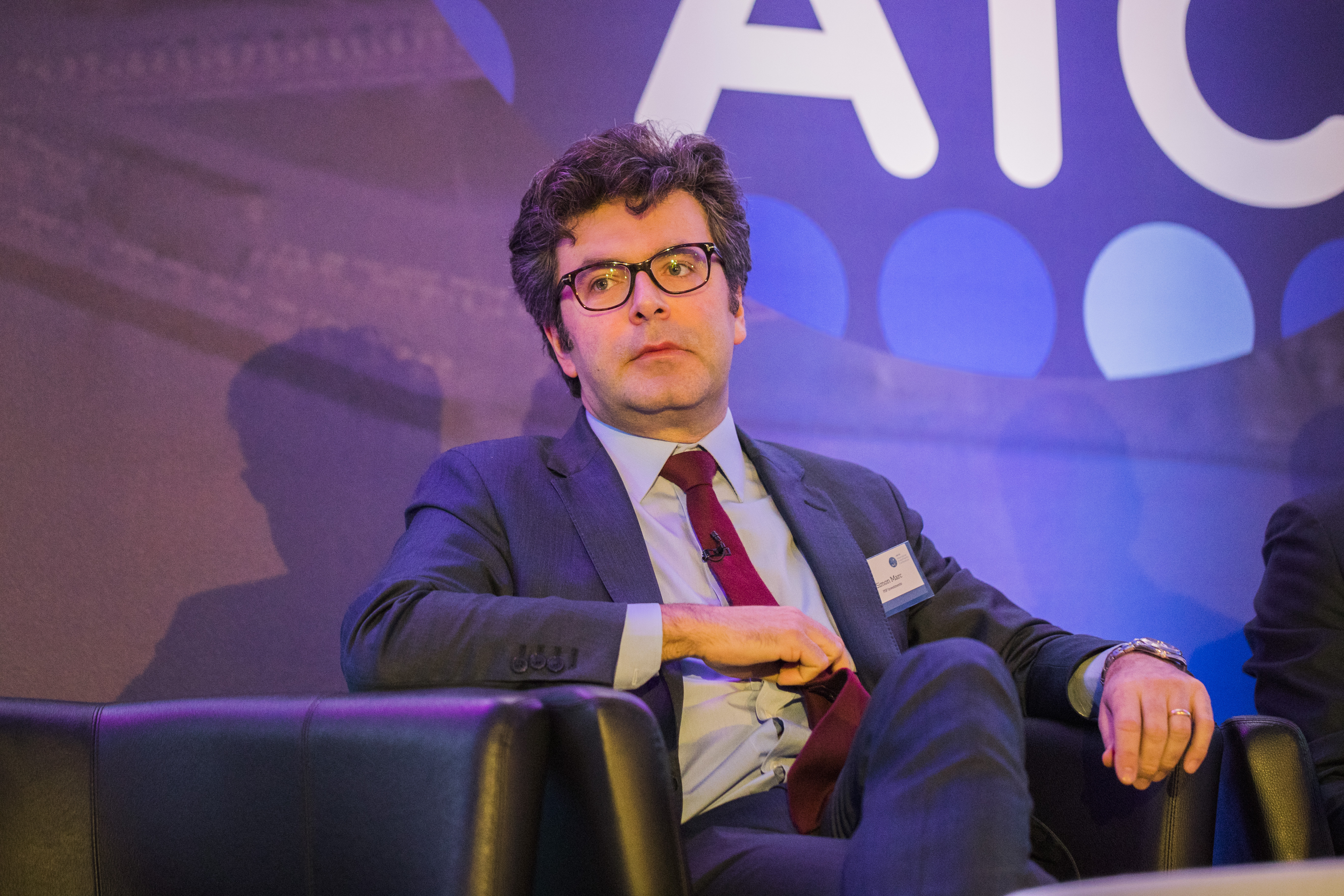
- Simon Marc (Head of Private Equity, PSP) spoke to over 320 students at the 2018 Alternative Investments Conference in London.
- Abbreviation: LSE AIC
- Formation: 2005; 21 years ago
- Type: Student conference
- Location: London, United Kingdom
- Official language: English
- Co-Chairmen: Raul Verma and Yuga Kozuki
- Co-Presidents: Chiara Karkour and Omar Chehidi
- Vice President: Zak Mirza
- Directors: Andre Goersch, Emily Pang, Jayden Engmann, Kit Young Tham, Carl Loeffler, Sienna de Lisser, Jessen Patel, Methul Amarapathy, Natalie Mo
- Staff: 30+
- Website: www.lseaic.com

The LSE SU Alternative Investments Conference (also known as the LSE AIC) is world’s largest student conference on alternatives, focusing primarily on Private Equity, Hedge Funds and Venture Capital. The conference is held annually in London by the Alternative Investments Society (AIC), a Student’s Union society at the London School of Economics and Political Science (LSE).

== History ==
In 2005, a group of LSE undergraduates founded the Alternative Investments Society with the aim of giving students access to the world of alternatives. The society still remains entire student-run.

The first Alternative Investments Conferences was hosted in 2007 as a single day event on the LSE campus which drew 200 students and several notable investors.

Today, the AIC has grown considerably to become the world's largest student-run conferences on private equity, hedge funds and venture capital. It has hosted some of the biggest names in finance, including Ray Dalio of Bridgewater Associates, Stephen Schwarzman of Blackstone, Howard Marks of Oaktree Capital and David Rubenstein of Carlyle.

AIC 2026 hosted 350 delegates from over 122 nationalities and 162 universities, chosen from more than 7,000 applications. Over two days, it ran 10 panels with more than 60 speakers and 40 participating firms. This AIC was hosted at the London Marriott Grosvenor Square for its largest edition yet, backed by sponsors including Blackstone.

== Overview ==
=== Format ===
The Conference takes place over two days at the five-star London Marriott Hotel Grosvenor Square, bringing together over 60 senior level industry leaders and 350 student delegates from many of the world’s leading educational institutions. Delegates come from a range of backgrounds, including both undergraduates and postgraduates studying finance, law, engineering, history as well as many other disciplines. Admission to the Conference is competitive, with only 7% of applicants selected to attend AIC 2025. The Conference is international in character, with applicants coming from over across 110 nationalities and 116 universities worldwide.

The format of the Conference sees delegates attend keynote speeches, panel discussions and workshop sessions designed to allow for them to learn from and interact with experienced professionals from within the investment community. Networking events are also held during the Conference by the AIC’s partner firms, as well as a dinner for all attending delegates hosted during the evening of the first day of the event. Sponsor firms of the AIC include Blackstone, Citadel, Sixth Street, PSP Investments, Point72 Asset Management, Saba Capital, CD&R, Bain Capital, Bain & Company, Bain Capital, 3i, Patron Capital, Lansdowne Partners, Dechert, Keensight Capital, and Dechert.

The Conference is proudly supported by its charity and media partners, including Dalio Philanthropies, the Financial Times and Private Equity News.

=== In the Media ===
The Conference is well regarded on campus, as well as outside of the LSE, having been cited in the media a number of times and described by the Financial Times as 'a chance for the best brains in asset management to meet'. Several keynote sessions from past conferences are also available to watch online.

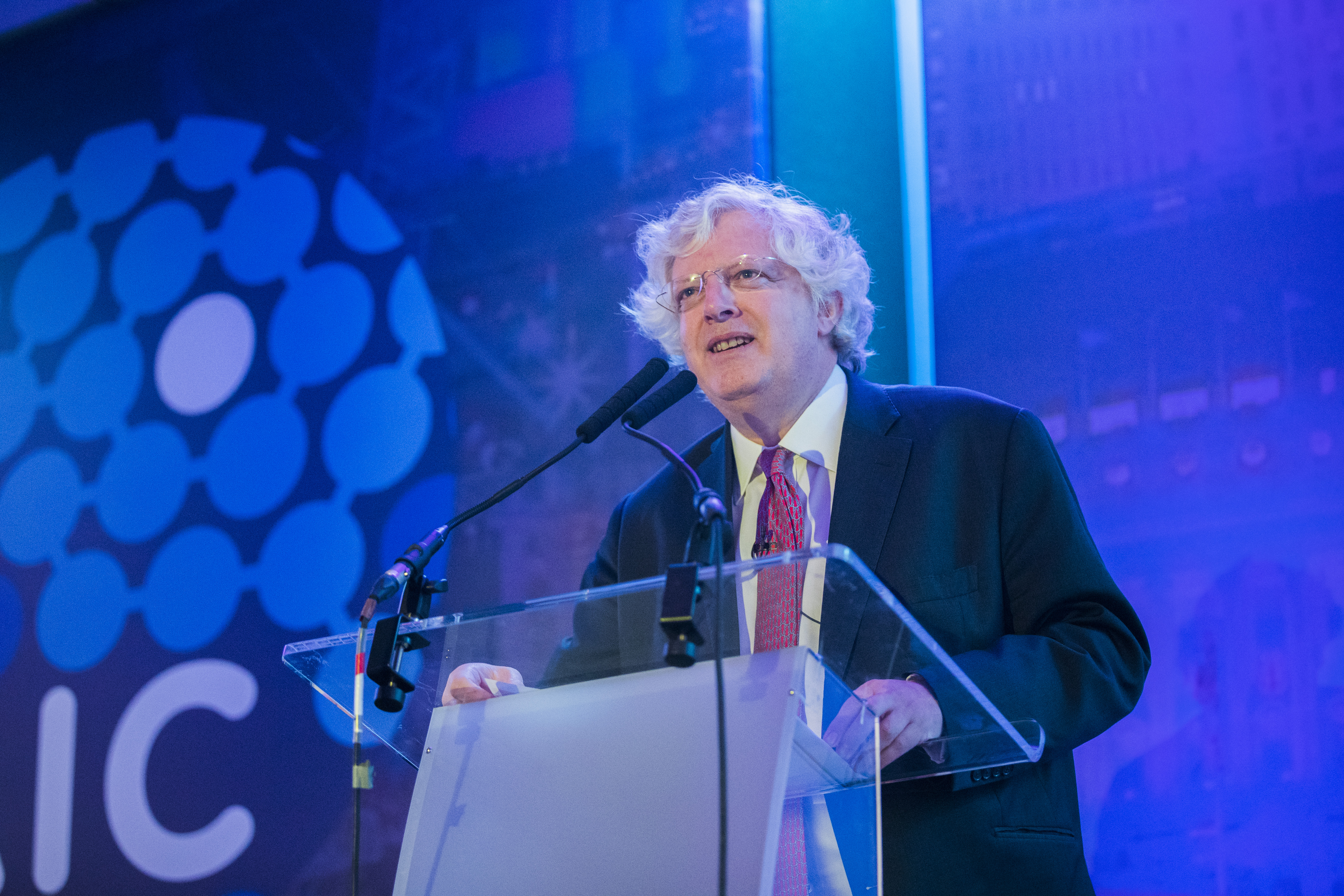
Guy Hands (Founder, Terra Firma) spoke at the 2019 Alternative Investments Conference featuring 320 delegates and 40 speakers across 2 days. The conference took place at the Marriott Grosvenor Square Hotel in London. Terra Firma is a Silver Sponsor (AIC 2019).

=== Notable past speakers ===
Several notable past speakers at the AIC include:

- Stephen Schwarzman (Chairman, CEO & Co-Founder, Blackstone)
- Ray Dalio (Founder & CIO Mentor, Bridgewater Associates)
- David Rubenstein (Co-Founder & Co-Chairman, The Carlyle Group)
- Marc Rowan (Co-Founder, CEO & Chair, Apollo Global Management)
- Emmanuel Roman (CEO, PIMCO)
- Howard Marks (Co-Chairman & Co-Founder, Oaktree Capital Management)
- Paul Singer (Founder, President & Co-CEO, Elliott Management)
- Bill Ackman (Founder & CEO, Pershing Square)
- Jonathan Lavine (Chair, Bain Capital)
- Jim Breyer (Founder & CEO, Breyer Capital)
- Dmitry Balyasny (Co-Founder, Managing Partner & CIO, Balyasny Asset Management)
- Boaz Weinstein (Founder & CIO, Saba Capital Management)
- Daniel A. D’Aniello (Co-Founder & Chairman Emeritus, The Carlyle Group)
- Anthony Scaramucci (Founder & Managing Partner, SkyBridge)
- Dr Josef Ackermann (Former CEO, Deutsche Bank)
- Sir Howard Davies (Former Director of the LSE & former Chairman of the Financial Services Authority)
- Sir Michael Hintze (Founder, CQS)
- Guy Hands (Founder & Former Chairman, Terra Firma Capital Partners)
- Jim Chanos (Founder, Chanos & Co., formerly Kynikos Associates)
- Gillian Tett (Provost, King’s College, Cambridge; Columnist, Financial Times)
- Sir Andrew Large (Former Deputy Governor, Bank of England)
- Luke Ellis (Former CEO, Man Group)
