= Baillie Gifford US Growth Trust =

British investment trust

- Company type: Public
- Traded as: LSE: USA; FTSE 250 component
- Industry: Investment management
- Founded: 2018
- Headquarters: Edinburgh, Scotland, UK
- Key people: Gary Robinson, Co-manager; Kirsty Gibson, Co-manager
- Website: Official site

Baillie Gifford US Growth Trust (LSE: USA) is a large British investment trust dedicated to investments in United States-based companies. It is listed on the London Stock Exchange and is a constituent of the FTSE 250 Index. It is managed by Edinburgh-based investment manager Baillie Gifford and the Chairman is Tom Burnet.

== History ==
The company was established in 2018. The managers were authorised to have up to 50% of the portfolio invested in unlisted companies, a higher proportion than some other investment trusts.

In December 2025, the US hedge fund, Saba Capital Management, blocked a proposed merger between Baillie Gifford US Growth Trust and Edinburgh Worldwide Investment Trust.
