= Victoria Studd =

British television presenter

Victoria Studd, also known as Victoria Bonham Carter, is a British television presenter.

== Career ==
Studd appeared as a presenter on the show Wish You Were Here?, appearing in eight episodes from 1991 to 1996. Prior to that, she spent a brief time presenting Holiday, a travel show that has also provided a presenting venue for the likes of Laurence Llewelyn-Bowen, Charlie Dimmock, and Hermione Norris over the years. During the 1980s, Studd presented art shows such as ORS 85 and Riverside, and was a co-presenter of the children's show Splash.

Studd had just one acting role, playing Lucy in the independent film titled Privileged in 1982, which was also the feature debuts for future stars Hugh Grant and Imogen Stubbs. In the film, she played the girlfriend of Hugh Grant's character. In an article for Bnet, Studd said that the pair came close to kissing; "So one day when we were walking home with him, I said: 'Hugh, if I'm going to play your girlfriend convincingly, I really should know what it's like to kiss you.' He agreed, and we were just going to kiss for the first time when a friend of his interrupted us." Grant has said that, in a sense, he owes his entire career to Studd; "The first time I was in front of a camera was when I was at Oxford University and we did a very pretentious student film, I didn't have any goal apart from having sex with a girl called Victoria Studd who was in the film. It was the only reason that I did it."

== Personal life ==
Her father was Clifford Studd. She is married to Edward Bonham Carter, brother of Oscar-nominated actress Helena Bonham Carter, and the couple have three children. They married on 1 October 1994 at Penn, Buckinghamshire, England. Her married name then became Bonham Carter, but she remains better known as Studd.
