= Carlyle Gifford =

British businessman (1881–1975)

Thomas Johnstone Carlyle Gifford
- Born: 14 January 1881; Kirkcudbrightshire
- Died: 24 January 1975 (aged 94)
- Education: University of Edinburgh
- Spouse(s): Maud Oriel Riata Pearson (1907); Sophia Mary Wharton Millar (1960)
- Children: 2

Thomas Johnstone Carlyle Gifford (14 January 1881 – 24 January 1975) was one of the founders of Baillie Gifford, one of the United Kingdom's largest investment management firms.

== Career ==
Born at Ingleston near Twynholm in Kirkcudbrightshire and educated at George Watson's College and the University of Edinburgh, Carlyle Gifford trained with the firm of W.S. Cook and became a writer to the signet in 1905.

In 1907 he co-founded the legal firm of Baillie Gifford WS which in 1909 formed and then acted as manager of the Scottish Mortgage and Trust Company Limited.

He specialised in land law and in stock exchange rules. He served on the boards of Scottish Widows and the University of Edinburgh.

He helped set up the Association of Investment Trust Companies in 1929 and served as chairman from 1934 to 1936.

During World War II he worked in the United States where he acted as an agent for HM Treasury selling British overseas investments.

He lived in Edinburgh.

== Family ==
In 1907 he married Maud Oriel Riata Pearson daughter of Charles Henry Pearson and together they had two sons, including Charles Henry Pearson Gifford FRSE (1909–1994). In 1960 he married again to Sophia Mary Wharton Millar who survived him.
