= Baillie Gifford Shin Nippon =

- Type: Public
- Traded as: LSE: BGS
- Industry: Investment management
- Founded: 1985
- Headquarters: Edinburgh, Scotland, UK
- Key people: Brian Lum, lead portfolio manager Jared Anderson, deputy portfolio manager
- Parent: Baillie Gifford & Co Limited
- Website: www.bailliegifford.com/en/uk/individual-investors/funds/baillie-gifford-shin-nippon/

Baillie Gifford Shin Nippon is a publicly traded investment trust which invests in Japanese smaller companies. The Trust is managed by Edinburgh-based investment management partnership Baillie Gifford & Co Limited. It is listed on the London Stock Exchange.

== History ==
Baillie Gifford Shin Nippon PLC was launched in July 1985, in order to capitalise on the investment opportunity available among companies too small and illiquid for Baillie Gifford Japan Trust PLC, which had been launched successfully four years before. Shin Nippon, which means New Japan, has as its objective the pursuit of long term capital growth principally through investment in small Japanese companies which are believed to have above average prospects for capital growth. It became part of the FTSE 250 Index in November 2020.
