= Pacific Horizon Investment Trust =

- Company type: Public
- Traded as: LSE: PHI
- Industry: Investment management
- Founded: 1989
- Headquarters: Edinburgh, Scotland, UK
- Key people: Roderick Snell, Trust Manager Ben Durrant, Deputy Manager
- Website: www.pacifichorizon.co.uk

The Pacific Horizon Investment Trust (LSE: PHI) is a publicly traded investment trust. The Trust invests in the markets of the Asia Pacific region (excluding Japan) and of the Indian Sub-continent. The Trust is managed by Baillie Gifford, an Edinburgh-based investment management partnership. It is listed on the London Stock Exchange and is a constituent of the FTSE 250 Index.

== History ==
The company was incorporated on 1 February 1989 under the name of Dealchief Public Limited Company. The company name was changed to Pacific Horizon Investment Trust PLC on 18 July 1989.

Dealing in the company's stock commenced on 22 September 1989 on the London Stock Exchange. Its original investment policy was to achieve capital growth by establishing itself in particular 'Horizon' economies of Asia and the Far East whose stock markets were in the process of opening up to greater inflows of foreign investment. As a consequence, investment in Japan, Australia, New Zealand, Hong Kong, Singapore, and Malaysia was excluded.

In 1992, at the end of the financial year, the Board decided to widen the company's investment objectives so as to embrace the whole of Asia except Japan. In addition, Baillie Gifford were appointed as managers, replacing Tyndall International (Asia) Limited. Consequently, management of the trust moved from Hong Kong to Edinburgh.
