= Edinburgh Worldwide Investment Trust =

Scottish company

Edinburgh Worldwide Investment Trust Plc
- Type: Public
- Traded as: LSE: EWI; FTSE 250 component
- Industry: Investment management
- Founded: 9 July 1998
- Headquarters: Edinburgh, Scotland, UK
- Key people: Douglas Brodie, Svetlana Viteva and Luke Ward, co-managers
- Parent: Baillie Gifford & Co Limited
- Website: edinburghworldwide.co.uk

Edinburgh Worldwide Investment Trust Plc is a publicly traded investment trust listed on the London Stock Exchange. The Trust, also known as EWIT, invests in global stock markets. The Trust is managed by Baillie Gifford & Co Limited, the Edinburgh based investment management partnership. It is listed on the London Stock Exchange and is a constituent of the FTSE 250 Index.

== History ==
Edinburgh Worldwide started trading on 9 July 1998 and is the successor investment trust launched following the reconstruction of Dunedin Worldwide Investment Trust.

In turn Dunedin Worldwide was formed in 1990 and was the successor vehicle for the Northern American Trust, one of the earlier Scottish investment trusts established in 1896 to take advantage of investment opportunities in the rapidly changing American economy at the turn of the century. Northern American merged with Camperdown Trust in 1937 and came under the management of Dunedin Fund Managers when it was formed in 1984.

Baillie Gifford & Co Limited was appointed as investment manager and secretaries to Edinburgh Worldwide with effect from 1 November 2003. While the objective of aiming for capital growth by investing in stockmarkets throughout the world remained unchanged, the portfolio was reorganised.

In December 2025, the US hedge fund, Saba Capital Management, blocked a proposed merger between Baillie Gifford US Growth Trust and Edinburgh Worldwide Investment Trust.

In January 2026, Saba Capital accused Edinburgh Worldwide of misleading shareholders over a sell-down of its SpaceX shares ahead of the merger attempt with Baillie Gifford US Growth Trust. Saba claimed that the shares in SpaceX had been sold at a price "far below" the current value. Saba called on investors to elect a new independent board, including three of its own nominees. Later that month shareholders rejected Saba's plans with 53.2% of votes. In April 2026, shareholders rejected a tender offer proposal largely due to opposition from Saba. The proposal was intended to provide liquidity while preserving exposure to SpaceX. The board announced that they would consider alternative tender offers proposed by Saba.

In April 2026, Saba Capital forced the resignation of the existing board members and secured the appointment of three new directors.
