= English Bicknor Castle =

- English Bicknor in Gloucestershire, England
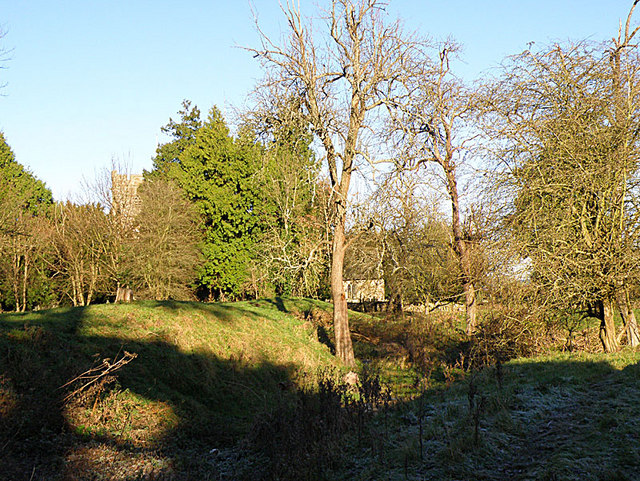
- The castle ruins today

Site information
- Type: Motte and bailey
- Condition: Earthworks only remain

Location
- Shown within Gloucestershire
- Coordinates: 51.838611°N 2.608611°W

English Bicknor Castle was a castle in the village of English Bicknor in Gloucestershire, England.

The castle was built in the 11th century as a motte and bailey design, although some suggest a later construction date in the early 12th century. The motte lay at the centre of two concentric outer bailey walls, producing a roughly circular castle approximately 150 yards across. The motte was placed against the south-west corner of the site, where the ground fell away from the castle, giving additional protection from attack. A square stone keep may have been built at a later stage on the motte, and a church was built in the outer bailey. At the start of years of the Anarchy the castle was controlled by the powerful Miles de Gloucester. The castle escaped destruction at the end of the conflict and was still in use at the beginning of the 13th century, when it was owned by William Avenel; its exact date of final ruin is unknown.

== See also ==
- Castles in Great Britain and Ireland
- List of castles in England

== Bibliography ==
- Amt, Emilie. (1993) The Accession of Henry II in England: royal government restored, 1149-1159. Woodbridge, UK: Boydell Press. ISBN 978-0-85115-348-3.
- Renn, Derek Frank. (1968) Norman castles in Britain. London: Baker.
- Rushforth and Knowles. (1931) "Proceedings at the Spring Meeting at Micheldean, Goodrich, English Bicknor and Newland," in Transactions of the Bristol and Gloucestershire Archaeological Society, 1931, Vol. 53.
