= Martin G. Smith =

English banker and investment manager

Sir Martin Gregory Smith (born 2 February 1943) is an English banker and investment manager.

== Early life ==
Born in 1943, Smith was educated at St Albans School, Hertfordshire, and St Edmund Hall, Oxford, where in 1964 he gained a first degree in theoretical physics. After five years in industry, which included being a trainee brewer at Guinness Brewery in Dublin, he continued his education at Stanford University from 1969 to 1971, gaining an MBA and a Master's degree in economics.

== Career ==
After Stanford, Smith joined McKinsey & Company in London as an associate. From there he went to two US commercial banks as a senior manager. In 1983, he co-founded Phoenix Securities, a corporate finance advisor that had much business around the "Big Bang" deregulation of the London Stock Exchange in 1986. In 1997, Phoenix was bought by Donaldson, Lufkin & Jenrette, and Smith chaired its European investment banking business until 2000. He then co-founded New Star Asset Management with John Duffield and was its Deputy Chairman. Duffield and Smith left in January 2009 when New Star was sold to the Henderson Group for £115 million. Smith's other roles in the city have included being Chairman of the technology investment bank GP Bullhound LLP and of Worldwide Healthcare Trust, and a director of Oxford Capital Partners.

== Personal life ==
On 2 October 1971, Smith married Elise Becket, a lawyer whom he had met at Stanford, daughter of George Campbell Becket; they have a son and a daughter.

Smith is an amateur orchestral conductor. In 1986, he co-founded the Orchestra of the Age of Enlightenment, serving as its Chairman, and is now its Life President. He chaired the English National Opera from 2000 to 2005, was Deputy Chairman of the Science Museum, London, 2000 to 2010, and has been a board member or trustee at the Royal Academy of Music, the Ashmolean Museum, Wigmore Hall, and Glyndebourne Festival Opera.

In 2008, Smith and his wife founded the Smith School of Enterprise and the Environment at the University of Oxford to research and teach sustainable finance and net-zero economics.

== Honours ==
Smith was knighted in the 2013 New Year Honours. He is a St Edmund Fellow of St Edmund Hall, Oxford, an honorary fellow of the Royal Academy of Music and a fellow of the Science Museum. In 2017, he was given an honorary doctorate by the University of Gloucestershire.
