= Monks Investment Trust =

British investment trust

- Type: Public
- Traded as: LSE: MNKS; FTSE 250 component
- Industry: Investment management
- Founded: 1929; 97 years ago
- Headquarters: Edinburgh, Scotland, UK
- Key people: Michael Taylor, Malcolm MacColl and Helen Xiong, co-managers
- Parent: Baillie Gifford & Co Limited
- Website: www.monksinvestmenttrust.co.uk

Monks Investment Trust is a large British investment trust focussed on long-term capital growth. It is listed on the London Stock Exchange and it is a constituent of the FTSE 250 Index.

== History ==
The company was incorporated in 1929 and was one of three trusts founded in the late 1920s by a group of investors headed by Sir Auckland (later Lord) Geddes. The other two trusts were The Friars Investment Trust and The Abbots Investment Trust. The company secretary's office was at 13/14 Austin Friars in the City of London hence the names. Sir Auckland Geddes was a former professor of anatomy who, during the First World War, had become Director of Recruiting at the War Office. He then went on to become a Unionist MP and a Cabinet Minister as President of the Board of Trade.

In 1931, Baillie Gifford & Co took over the management of all three companies. In 1968, under a Scheme of Arrangement, the three trusts were merged with Monks acquiring the ordinary share capital of Friars and Abbots.
