= Nichola Pease =

British fund manager (born 1961)

- Born: 3 April 1961 (age 64); Northumberland, England
- Education: University of Exeter
- Occupation: Banker
- Spouse: Crispin Odey (m. 1991; div. 2021)
- Children: 3
- Parent(s): Sir Richard Pease, 3rd Baronet; Anne Heyworth
- Relatives: Richard Pease (brother)
- Family: Pease family

Nichola Pease (born 3 April 1961) is a British fund manager.

According to The Sunday Times Rich List in 2019, Pease and her then husband Crispin Odey were worth £775 million.

== Early life ==
Nichola Pease was born in April 1961. Her father, Sir Richard Pease, 3rd Baronet, was a banker. Her mother is Anne Heyworth.

She received a bachelor's degree in English from the University of Exeter.

== Career ==
Pease started her career in finance at Kleinwort Benson in 1983. In 1985, she joined Smith New Court and by 1989, she was a director.

She served as the chief executive officer (CEO) of J.O. Hambro Capital Management from 1998 to 2008, while James Hambro was the chairman. She stepped down as deputy chairman in 2008, when she was replaced as CEO by Gavin Rochussen. Upon its 2011 merger with BT Investment Management, an Australian financial firm, she earned a third of £124 million.

She was on the board of directors of Northern Rock from 1999 to 2007. She was a director of Grainger plc from 2001 to 2005. She is a non-executive director of Schroders.

In 2019, Pease was appointed by Jupiter Fund Management as non-executive chairman.

On 26 April 2023, she stepped down as non-executive chair of Jupiter Fund Management with immediate effect, citing "personal reasons". This followed her recent divorce from Crispin Odey.

On 8 June 2023, the Financial Times released an exposé of how her former husband, Crispin Odey, evaded sexual assault allegations for decades, with thirteen women accusing the hedge fund titan of harassment, abuse and fostering a toxic workplace.

== Personal life ==
She married Crispin Odey, a hedge fund manager, in 1991 before divorcing in 2021. They have three children.
