= Baillie Gifford Japan Trust =

Publicly traded investment trust

The Baillie Gifford Japan Trust Public Limited Company
- Type: Public
- Traded as: LSE: BGFD; FTSE 250 component
- Industry: Investment management
- Founded: 1981
- Headquarters: Edinburgh, Scotland, UK
- Key people: Matthew Brett, Trust Manager
- Website: japantrustplc.co.uk

The Baillie Gifford Japan Trust Public Limited Company is a publicly traded investment trust. The Trust invests exclusively in Japan. The Trust is managed by Baillie Gifford & Co Limited, the Edinburgh-based investment management partnership. It is listed on the London Stock Exchange and is a constituent of the FTSE 250 Index.

== History ==
The Japan Trust, launched in 1981, is the longest established existing Japanese investment trust, having survived the ebb and flow of corporate activity in the Japanese sector. The first specialist Japanese investment trust was launched in the early 1970s, as Japan, undergoing rapid economic expansion, eased its restrictions on foreigners owning shares. Several other trusts were launched over the next few years and by the time the Company was listed in December 1981 there were five Japanese investment trusts in existence.

The Japanese investment trust sector is now regarded as being divided into two: general Japan and small company Japan. The Company, despite its specialisation in medium and small sized companies, is categorised as a general trust given that it is not a pure small capital specialist. The managers do have permission to buy large companies where either there are no small ones in the sector, or where the investment opportunity seems especially attractive. In order to improve liquidity in its shares, in November 2000 the Company had a 5:1 stock split. Since its incorporation, the Company has had two tranches of warrants issued and subsequently exercised. One distinctive feature of the Company is that it has had a series of continuation votes, which are now held annually.

== See also ==
- Economy of Japan
