= Sir Richard Pease, 3rd Baronet =

British banker (1922–2021)

- Born: 20 May 1922; Richmond, Yorkshire, England
- Died: 9 March 2021 (aged 98); Stocksfield-on-Tyne, Northumberland, England
- Education: Eton College
- Known for: Chairman of Yorkshire Bank; Vice-chairman of Barclays
- Spouse: Anne Heyworth (m. 1950; died 2006)
- Children: 3, including Richard Peter Pease and Nichola Pease
- Relatives: Sir Arthur Pease, 1st Baronet (grandfather)

Sir Richard Thorn Pease, 3rd Baronet, DL (20 May 1922 – 9 March 2021) was a British banker, who was chairman of Yorkshire Bank, and vice-chairman of Barclays.

== Early life ==
Pease was born in 1922 at Prior House, in Richmond, Yorkshire, the son of Sir Richard Arthur Pease (1890–1969), the 2nd Baronet, and the grandson of Sir Arthur Pease, 1st Baronet (1866–1927). He was educated at Eton College.

His elder brother Arthur Peter Pease was an RAF Flying Officer who was killed in action on 15 September 1940, aged just 22, during the Battle of Britain, when his Spitfire was shot down near Kingswood, in Kent.

== Career ==
Pease was chairman of Yorkshire Bank, and vice-chairman of Barclays.

== Personal life ==
Pease married Anne Heyworth and they have three children:

- Carolyn Thorn Pease, married to John Varley, CEO of Barclays from 2004 to 2011
- Richard Peter Pease, 4th Baronet, fund manager
- Nichola Pease, married to fellow hedge fund manager Crispin Odey

He lived at Hindley House, Stocksfield-on-Tyne, Northumberland, England. Pease died in March 2021 at the age of 98.

Baronetage of the United Kingdom
Preceded by Richard Pease	Baronet (of Hammersknott); 1969–2021	Succeeded by Richard Pease
