= 2012 JPMorgan Chase trading loss =

$6 billion trading loss

In April and May 2012, large trading losses occurred at JPMorgan's Chief Investment Office, based on transactions booked through its London branch. The unit was run by Chief Investment Officer Ina Drew, who later stepped down. A series of derivative transactions involving credit default swaps (CDS) were entered, reportedly as part of the bank's "hedging" strategy. Trader Bruno Iksil, nicknamed the London Whale, accumulated outsized CDS positions in the market. An estimated trading loss of US$2 billion was announced. However, the loss amounted to more than US$6 billion for JPMorgan Chase.

These events gave rise to a number of investigations to examine the firm's risk management systems and internal controls. As a consequence, JPMorgan Chase agreed to pay a total of US$920 million in fines to US and UK authorities (including £137.6 million to UK). JPMorgan Chase cut chief executive Jamie Dimon's 2012 pay in half, from US$23 million to $11.5 million, as a consequence for the $6 billion trading loss.

== Background ==
In February 2012, hedge fund managers such as Boaz Weinstein of Saba Capital Management became aware that the market in credit default swaps was possibly being affected by aggressive trading activities. The source of the unusual activity turned out to be Bruno Iksil, a trader for JPMorgan Chase & Co. Market-moving trades by the bank's Chief Investment Office had first been uncovered in June 2011 by Dan Alderson, a reporter at trade journal Creditflux, which reported on anomalies in CDX HY index tranche pricing dynamics caused by Iksil's trading activity. The same journal reported on further tranche trading activity by the JP Morgan unit two months later. By 2012, heavy opposing bets to his positions had been made by traders, including another branch of JPMorgan, who purchased the derivatives that JPMorgan was selling in high volume. JPMorgan denied the first news reports, with Chairman and CEO Jamie Dimon calling it a "tempest in a teapot". Major losses of US$2 billion were reported by the firm in May 2012 in relation to these trades. By this point, the issue was being investigated by the Federal Reserve, SEC, and FBI.

On July 13, 2012, the total loss was updated to US$5.8 billion with the addition of a $4.4 billion loss in the second quarter and subsequent recalculation of a loss of $1.4 billion for the first quarter. A spokesman for the firm claimed that projected total losses could be more than $7 billion. The disclosure, which resulted in headlines in the media, did not disclose the exact nature of the trading involved, which remained in progress as of May 16, 2012, as JPMorgan's losses mounted and other traders sought to profit or avoid losses resulting from JPMorgan's positions. As of June 28, 2012, JPMorgan's positions were continuing to produce losses which could total as much as $9 billion under worst-case scenarios. The trades were possibly related to CDX IG 9, a credit default swap index based on the default risk of major U.S. corporations that has been described as a "derivative of a derivative". On the company's emergency conference call, JPMorgan Chase Chairman and CEO Jamie Dimon said the strategy was "flawed, complex, poorly reviewed, poorly executed, and poorly monitored".

== Trades ==
On February 2, 2012, at the Harbor Investment Conference, speaking to an audience of investors, Boaz Weinstein recommended buying the Markit CDX North America Investment Grade Series 9 10-Year Index, CDX IG 9. This contract was a standardized credit derivative contract with an initial ten-year maturity, maturing on December 20, 2017. The price of the CDX IG index reflects the credit risk of an underlying basket of North American investment-grade companies. Weinstein had noticed this contract was an unusually cheap way to buy credit protection relative to other more liquid indices. It turned out that JPMorgan was shorting the index by making huge trades. JPMorgan's bet was that credit markets would strengthen; the index is based on 121 investment grade bonds issued by North American corporations. Investors who followed Weinstein's tip did poorly during the early months of 2012 as JPMorgan strongly supported its position. However, by May, after investors became concerned about the implications of the euro area crisis, the situation reversed and JPMorgan suffered large losses. In addition to Weinstein's Saba Capital Management, BlueMountain Capital, BlueCrest Capital, Lucidus Capital Partners, CQS, III, and Hutchin Hill are hedge funds which are known to have benefited from taking the other side of the trade to JPMorgan. A separate unit of JPMorgan was also on the winning side.

The $6.2 billion loss came from three positions that partially offset one another. It occurred when the world's financial markets were in relative calm. Had quality spread curves twisted or worldwide economic distress been more pronounced the loss could have been much higher.

The Financial Times column "Alphaville" analysis suggests that these positions were not volatile enough to account for the full losses reported. They suggest that other positions are likely involved as well.

== Investigation ==
The internal investigation concluded in July 2012. It involved more than 1,000 people across the firm and outside law firm WilmerHale. A report issued in January 2013 made the following "key observations"

- "CIO [Chief Investment Office] judgment, execution and escalation in the First Quarter of 2012 were poor"
- "The Firm did not ensure that the controls and oversight of CIO evolved commensurately with the increased complexity and risks of certain CIO activities"
- "CIO risk management was ineffective in dealing with synthetic credit portfolio"
- "Risk limits for CIO were not sufficiently granular"
- "Approval and implementation of CIO Synthetic Credit VaR Model were inadequate"

In July 2017, U.S. prosecutors dropped criminal charges against two derivative traders from France and Spain after unsuccessful efforts to extradite them from their countries.

The U.S. Securities and Exchange Commission charged JPMorgan "with misstating financial results and lacking effective internal controls to detect and prevent its traders from fraudulently overvaluing investments to conceal hundreds of millions of dollars in trading losses.

According to the SEC’s order, in late April 2012 after the portfolio began to significantly decline in value, JPMorgan commissioned several internal reviews to assess, among other matters, the effectiveness of the CIO’s internal controls. From these reviews, senior management learned that the valuation control group within the CIO – whose function was to detect and prevent trader mismarking – was woefully ineffective and insufficiently independent from the traders it was supposed to police. As JPMorgan senior management learned additional troubling facts about the state of affairs in the CIO, they failed to timely escalate and share that information with the firm’s audit committee.

Among the facts that JPMorgan has admitted in settling the SEC’s enforcement action:

   The trading losses occurred against a backdrop of woefully deficient accounting controls in the CIO, including spreadsheet miscalculations that caused large valuation errors and the use of subjective valuation techniques that made it easier for the traders to mismark the CIO portfolio.
   JPMorgan senior management personally rewrote the CIO’s valuation control policies before the firm filed with the SEC its first quarter report for 2012 in order to address the many deficiencies in existing policies.
   By late April 2012, JPMorgan senior management knew that the firm’s Investment Banking unit used far more conservative prices when valuing the same kind of derivatives held in the CIO portfolio, and that applying the Investment Bank valuations would have led to approximately $750 million in additional losses for the CIO in the first quarter of 2012. 
   External counterparties who traded with CIO had valued certain positions in the CIO book at $500 million less than the CIO traders did, precipitating large collateral calls against JPMorgan.
   As a result of the findings of certain internal reviews of the CIO, some executives expressed reservations about signing sub-certifications supporting the CEO and CFO certifications required under the Sarbanes-Oxley Act.
   Senior management failed to adequately update the audit committee on these and other important facts concerning the CIO before the firm filed its first quarter report for 2012.
   Deprived of access to these facts, the audit committee was hindered in its ability to discharge its obligations to oversee management on behalf of shareholders and to ensure the accuracy of the firm’s financial statements.

The SEC’s investigation has been conducted by Michael Osnato, Steven Rawlings, Peter Altenbach, Joshua Brodsky, Joseph Boryshansky, Daniel Michael, Kapil Agrawal, Eli Bass, Sharon Bryant, Daniel Nigro, and Christopher Mele."

== JPM organizational structure, risk systems, accounting and internal control ==
The trades occurred within the Chief Investment Office (CIO), where staff were reportedly "faithfully executing strategies demanded by the bank's risk management model". This unit is reported to have very wide latitude in otherwise unsupervised trading. The company had been without a treasurer for five months during the time of the trades and had a relatively inexperienced executive, Irvin Goldman, in charge of risk management in the CIO.

The trades took place in a unit of JPMorgan that reported directly to Chairman & CEO Jamie Dimon. In Congressional testimony it came out that Dimon wanted to be responsible for what information was revealed, and information was withheld from the regulators. There had been a series of violations of the Sarbanes–Oxley regulations requiring certain protections.

On May 10, 2012, Dimon announced that there was a loss of at least $2 billion through "egregious mistakes" in trading.

== Impact on Volcker Rule implementation ==
The Volcker Rule, part of the Dodd–Frank Wall Street Reform and Consumer Protection Act, bans high-risk trading inside commercial banking and lending institutions. The Volcker rule is sometimes referred to as "a modern Glass-Steagall firewall that separates core banking system from higher-risk, hedge fund-style proprietary trading". The rule's implementation had been repeatedly delayed however, with analysts predicting implementation in 2014 and lobbyists simultaneously pushing to delay it longer. The final version of the Volcker Rule was passed on December 10, 2013, which was implemented in July 2015.

== Lobby efforts and government relations ==
Bloomberg News and Robert Schmidt identified several people at JPM involved in the lobbying and its government relations response.

== See also ==
- List of trading losses
- Proprietary trading
- Rogue trader
- Speculation
- Swap (finance)

== References and sources ==
Sources

- https://web.archive.org/web/20130412010440/http://investor.shareholder.com/jpmorganchase/events-files.cfm

Further reading

- Levine, Matt (May 11, 2012). "The Tale Of A Whale Of A Fail". Dealbreaker.

External links

- JP Morgan Chase Whale Trades: A Case History of Derivatives Risks and Abuses: Hearing before the Permanent Subcommittee on Investigations of the Committee on Homeland Security and Governmental Affairs, United States Senate, One Hundred Thirteenth Congress, First Session, March 15, 2013, Vol. 1 Vol. 2
