= Augustus Baillie =

Lieutenant Colonel Augustus Charles Baillie (1861–1939)

- Born: 25 March 1861
- Died: 8 January 1939 (aged 77)
- Military career
- Allegiance: United Kingdom
- Branch: British Army
- Rank: Lieutenant Colonel
- Conflicts: Second Boer War; World War I
- Awards: Distinguished Service Order

Lieutenant Colonel Augustus Charles Baillie, DSO (25 March 1861 – 8 January 1939) was one of the founders of Baillie Gifford, one of the United Kingdom's largest investment managers.

== Career ==
Brought up in Scotland, Baillie was the second son of Evan Peter Montagu Baillie of Dochfour and Lady Frances Anna Bruce, youngest daughter of Thomas Bruce, 7th Earl of Elgin. He was commissioned into the Royal Horse Artillery in 1880, but resigned his commission in 1886.

Baillie rejoined the forces to fight in the Second Boer War, and was appointed in command of the 15th Battalion, Imperial Yeomanry with the rank of lieutenant-colonel from 25 May 1901. The war ended in June 1902, and he left Port Elizabeth for Southampton on the SS Colombian the following month. He relinquished his command of the 15th battalion and was granted the honorary rank of lieutenant-colonel in the army on 3 September 1902. For his service in the war, he was mentioned in despatches and was awarded the Distinguished Service Order (DSO) in November 1900. After his return to the United Kingdom, he was promoted to the substantive rank of major in the Lovat Scouts Imperial Yeomanry in 1903.

In 1907 he co-founded the legal firm of Baillie Gifford WS which in 1909 formed and then acted as manager of The Scottish Mortgage and Trust Company Limited.

He was promoted to the substantive rank of lieutenant-colonel on 1 April 1908, but again resigned his commission in 1910.

In September 1914 following the outbreak of World War I he was appointed commanding officer of 2nd Lovat Scouts.

He died in 1939.
