= Scottish Mortgage Investment Trust =

Publicly traded investment trust

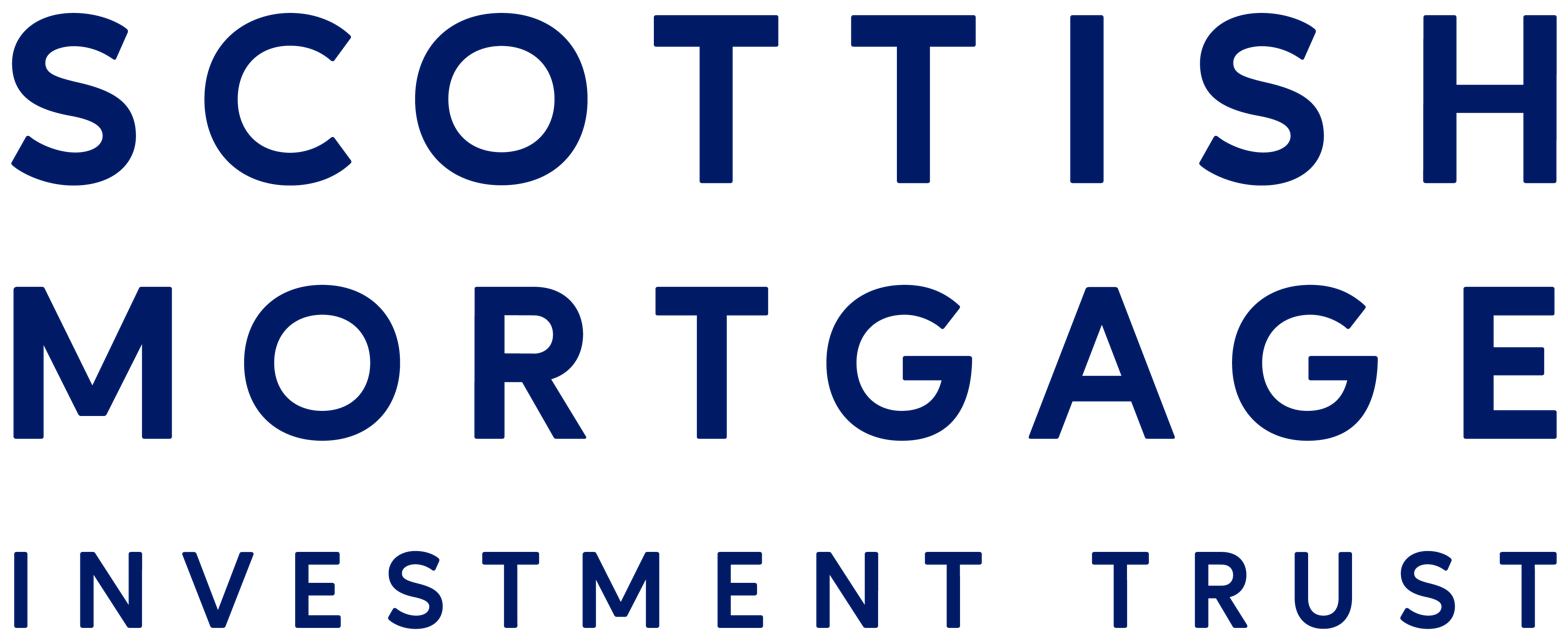
- Type: Public
- Traded as: LSE: SMT; FTSE 100 Component
- Industry: Investment management
- Founded: 1909; 117 years ago
- Headquarters: Edinburgh, Scotland, United Kingdom
- Key people: Justin Dowley (Chairperson); Tom Slater (manager); Lawrence Burns (deputy manager)
- Website: www.scottishmortgageit.com

Scottish Mortgage Investment Trust is a publicly traded investment trust. It invests globally, looking for strong businesses with above-average returns. Scottish Mortgage is managed by Baillie Gifford & Co Limited, the Edinburgh-based investment management partnership. It is listed on the London Stock Exchange and is a constituent of the FTSE 100 Index.

== History ==
The origins of Scottish Mortgage lie in a credit crisis, the Panic of 1907. By 1909 the growing popularity of the motorcar, including the Model T Ford, was creating significant demand for tyres, which rubber planters in Southeast Asia were keen to exploit, but credit was still difficult to obtain. In Edinburgh, the recently formed legal partnership between Colonel Augustus Baillie and Carlyle Gifford (which ultimately became Baillie Gifford & Co) spotted an opportunity. They established The Straits Mortgage and Trust Company Limited to lend money to the planters, secured on the rubber estates.

Within a couple of years, however, the credit crisis was over and rubber planters no longer required finance from Straits Mortgage on the scale anticipated. In 1913, the Trust's investment remit was widened to include bond and equity markets worldwide, and its name changed to The Scottish Mortgage and Trust Company Limited.

“By 1913 it was obvious the future of the trust lay in operating as a normal investment trust – that is to say, one which invested in a broad range of securities, very largely overseas, as was typical of Scottish investment trusts of the period, with a strong bias towards North America – rather than the Rubber plantation specialist that had originally been envisaged. In recognition of this, the Board decided to change its name to “The Scottish Mortgage and Trust Limited”; this change of name received official approval on 31 May 1913.”

Early investments reflected the rapid global industrialisation that characterised the period, including shares in oil and railway companies and loans to the Argentine, Indian, Chinese and Imperial Ottoman governments.

From early on, North American investments featured in Scottish Mortgage's portfolio, but these were augmented substantially in the mid-1930s with the proceeds of European investments sold in reaction to the deteriorating political situation in Europe. By 1940, 22 per cent of the portfolio was invested in US names. Soon after, however, the British government mandated the sale and repatriation of all American securities owned by British citizens, including those of Scottish Mortgage. The government's representative overseeing this formidable exercise was Carlyle Gifford. The proportion invested in the US fell to 6.6 per cent by 1942, not to be rebuilt until the 1950s. By 1957, in the midst of the post-War boom in equities, the chairman noted, "...we have over 44 per cent of our assets...in USA and Canada. Indeed, a higher proportion would have been even better".

In the 1960s, the Trust was among the first to take advantage of the lifting of restrictions on foreigners investing in the burgeoning Japanese market; a sound investment decision, but a controversial one with wartime memories still fresh.

The amount invested in the UK allocation has also varied. During the early 1970s, UK equities and bonds fell from 63 per cent in 1972 to nearly 45 per cent of the Trust two years later. While some of this decline reflects steep relative falls in the UK stock market, it also reflects a deliberate move away from the UK. The exasperation of the chairman comes through in his 1975 statement: "The fact is that this country has got itself into a really dreadful mess... We continue to have more confidence in investment prospects overseas than in the UK".

Scottish Mortgage celebrated its centenary year in 2009. Investments continue to reflect the global-nature of the Trust with holdings in fast-growing economies such as China and Brazil. As at 20 August 2020 the Trust had total net assets of approximately £14.6 billion.

As of 30 September 2021, the Trust had total net assets of approximately £19.5 billion.

== Investments ==
The company's philosophy is to 'invest in progress' by identifying companies and entrepreneurs building the future of the economy. The Trust holds publicly traded companies as well as an allocation of capital to private companies, which as of October 2023 includes; Elon Musk's rocket company, SpaceX and the TikTok developer, ByteDance.

The Trust is able to invest up to 30% of the value of the Trust, measured at the time of investment, in private companies at any one time.

== Dividends ==
Over the entire history of Scottish Mortgage, it has cut its dividend only once, in 1933 - after the effects of the Depression ravaged its portfolio. In every other year, it either maintained or increased its dividend, even during both World Wars. In 1942 the chairman wrote with masterly understatement of "some important adverse influences... Our revenue has suffered from the almost complete stoppage of dividends from the invaded areas".
