= Crispin Odey =

English hedge fund manager (born 1959)

- Born: January 1959 (age 67); Yorkshire, England
- Education: Harrow School
- Alma mater: Christ Church, Oxford
- Occupations: Investor, fund manager
- Known for: Odey Asset Management
- Spouses: Prudence Murdoch (m. 1985; div. 1986) Nichola Pease (m. 1991; div. 2021) Diana Vitkova (m. 2022)
- Children: 3
- Relatives: George Odey (grandfather)
- Website: www.odey.com

Robin Crispin William Odey (born January 1959) is a British hedge fund manager and founder of Odey Asset Management.

In June 2023, the Financial Times published an investigative report which alleged that Odey had sexually harassed or assaulted 13 women over the course of 25 years. Odey denied the allegations. Odey Asset Management announced shortly afterwards that Odey would be leaving the firm. Investors soon started pulling their money from the firm following the report, prompting it to suspend withdrawals. In late June 2023 the company suspended flagship hedge funds, and it was speculated that it might break up. In March 2025, the Financial Conduct Authority (FCA) fined Crispin Odey £1.8 million and banned him from the UK financial services industry for a 'lack of integrity'. Odey unsuccessfully challenged the decision in the Upper Tribunal, though the fine was cut to £1.5 milion.

== Early life and education ==
Odey was born in the East Riding of Yorkshire, the only son of (George) Richard Odey. His father was from a family of Yorkshire industrialists, and his grandfather George Odey, "a formidable bully", had been the Conservative MP for Beverley. His mother's maiden name was Clitherow. In 1980, his sister Caroline married the Hon. Henry David Montgomery, the son of David Montgomery, 2nd Viscount Montgomery of Alamein and heir apparent to the viscountcy. They have three children.

Odey was educated at Harrow School, where his father had been head boy, and graduated from Christ Church, Oxford in 1980 with a degree in history and economics. Soon after graduation, he found out that his father had huge debts, and the trustees of Hotham Hall, a 4,000-acre estate that had been in his mother's family since 1720, transferred it to him absolutely. Aged 23, he sold everything. According to Odey, his father was a "wastrel from beginning to end", and survived on handouts from his son.

== Career ==
=== Early funds ===
After university Odey qualified as a barrister but instead of taking up a legal career, he joined Framlington fund managers, and then left to work for Barings International, where he managed the Baring European Growth Trust. He ran continental European pension funds at Framlington and Barings.

=== Odey Asset Management (1991–2019) ===
Odey founded Odey Asset Management in 1991. George Soros was one of the original investors, seeding Odey $150 million. Odey suffered large losses in 1994 when the Federal Reserve unexpectedly lifted interest rates (one of his funds lost 44 per cent of its value), but went on to thrive, for instance by foreseeing that the value of insurers would rise after the September 11 attacks on New York in 2001. Through the early part of the 2000s, Odey worked closely with Hugh Hendry, whom he had recruited and who ran Odey's top performing Continental Europe Fund. Hendry left in 2005 to establish Eclectica Asset Management. In reference to Hendry, Odey himself said: "Odey in the 1990s was a one-man band; Odey in the 2000s was a two-man band".

According to The New York Times, Odey "came to prominence during the 2008 financial crisis when he shorted banking shares, a lucrative wager that helped him to earn almost 28 million pounds that year". That year his return was 54.8 per cent. He had been bearish about the position of banks for a number of years, shorting Bradford & Bingley as early as 2005, questioning the German Landesbanks and warning consistently about the dangers of debt and inflated house prices. He continued his short positions into early 2009 but in April took longer positions as he predicted the market rally of that year. The Times newspaper selected Odey as a "Business Big Shot" in 2008.

In May 2009, Odey attracted some controversy for saying in The Times that he would leave the country to avoid paying 50% income tax. He was at the centre of further controversy in 2009 when it was suggested that he financially backed anti-EU campaigners in the Irish referendum on the Lisbon Treaty while some hedge funds had taken out specific bets on the insolvency of the country in the event that the vote not be carried. The Treaty passed by a margin of 67.1 per cent to 32.9 per cent. In faxes sent to RTÉ and TV3, Odey denied that he had funded the Libertas "no" campaign.

In May 2010, Odey Asset Management formed a new investment management firm with Geneva's Bruellan Wealth Management called Odey Bruellan. In April 2011, the firm had $6.5 to $7 billion under management, with Odey personally running $4 billion of assets. Odey Asset Management's Odey European Inc. fund was ranked No. 5 on Bloomberg's 2012 list of the 100 Top-Performing Large Hedge Funds.

In 2016, it was reported that Odey saw his personal fortune drop by £200 million after profits at Odey Asset Management suffered a significant decline. His salary was cut because profits were down nearly 45% from the previous year.

In 2016, Odey was a prominent backer of Brexit, arguing it would allow the UK to govern itself. Later that year, his hedge fund won about 15% of its value following the results of the Brexit referendum. He told the BBC on the morning of the result that he had made £220 million speculating that the markets would fall, saying "'Il mattino ha l'oro in bocca' – the morning has gold in its mouth". Overall, his flagship fund made losses of almost 50% in 2016. The firm's operating profits dropped from 44.3 million pounds to 18.6 million pounds in 2016.

In June 2017, The Daily Telegraph reported that his fund had profited from the drop in the value of the pound that resulted from a hung parliament. In August 2017, he remained an investor in Sky. After initially backing the Fox bid for Sky, in November 2017, he opposed the bid, after Sky's financial results proved "better than people forecast."

Assets under management at the fund dropped from $11.7 billion at the start of 2015, to $5.5 billion in September 2017. Also, funds in his flagship fund, Odey European, fell from €2.5 billion at the start of 2015 to €184 million. The Financial Times chalked the losses in part to "poorly timed" trades. On 5 January 2018, The New York Times reported that Odey Asset Management had lost more than a fifth of its value in 2017, dropping around 20.5 percent.

According to Bloomberg in November 2017, he was "known for his bearish outlook" on the markets. The New York Times reported that Odey's fund's "performance has suffered heavily after he took a negative stance on the outlook for the global economy and bearish positions against shares that have not borne fruit." He had also made "bets against the Fed", explaining to his clients that "it would certainly be simpler to follow the market. But then we would be ignoring the fundamental data". He had also assumed there would be a crash resulting from high interest rates.

=== Since 2020: sexual assault allegations and departure from firm ===
In May 2020, Odey was charged with indecent assault after a complaint by a woman over an incident in 1998. Odey denied the charge at Westminster Magistrates' Court in September and was bailed to appear at Hendon magistrates' court in February 2021. After a trial at Westminster Magistrates' Court in March 2021, Odey was cleared of the charge.

In June 2023, the Financial Times reported allegations that he had sexually harassed or assaulted 13 women over 25 years. Odey denied the allegations. Following the Financial Times report, it was reported that Financial Conduct Authority was preparing to launch an investigation into Odey Asset Management regarding the allegations about Odey. It was also announced that Morgan Stanley and JPMorgan Chase were cancelling their relationships with the firm.

On 10 June, Odey Asset Management's executive committee said that Odey was no longer involved with the firm, commenting "he will no longer have any economic or personal involvement in the partnership." The firm announced that it will now be "owned and controlled by the remaining partners and managed as an independent legal entity." Shortly after, the company announced its plan to rebrand, removing Odey's name from the firm's name.

In 2026, the media reported that the head of the fund described Crispin Odey as a "sex pest".

=== 2025–2026: FCA ban and unsuccessful appeal ===
In March 2025, the FCA fined Crispin Odey £1.8 million and banned him from the UK financial services industry for a 'lack of integrity'. Odey was said to have shown "reckless disregard" for the governance of his hedge fund, with his conduct showing he was "not a fit and proper person to perform any function related to regulated activities". Odey challenged the lifetime ban and fine in the Upper Tribunal.

The court case before Judge Rupert Jones began on 9 March 2026, and was scheduled to last three weeks. It was the first time that Odey was cross examined about the events that unfolded at his former firm. On 24 March 2026, Odey admitted to the court that he "groped a colleague's breasts without her consent in 2005". He also told the court that he does not remember cornering a female employee after a boozy lunch and saying to her "I could attack you now". Odey's appeal against the ban was unsuccessful, though the fine was reduced to £1.5m.

== Personal life ==
Odey was briefly married to Rupert Murdoch's eldest daughter, Prudence. The marriage lasted 15 months, and they had no children.

Odey subsequently married Nichola Pease, deputy chairman of JO Hambro Capital Management and a member of one of the founding families of Barclays Bank. The couple had two sons and one daughter.

According to the Sunday Times Rich List 2019, Odey and his wife Nichola Pease were worth £775 million. They divorced in 2021. Odey married Diana Vitkova the following year.

He owns the historic 17th century Eastbach Court mansion in the Forest of Dean, English Bicknor. The house has been Grade II listed since 1953.

== See also ==
- Edward Chancellor
- List of alumni of Christ Church, Oxford
