= Baillie Gifford =

British investment manager

Baillie Gifford & Co
- Type: Private
- Industry: Investment management
- Founded: 1908; 118 years ago
- Founders: Augustus Baillie; Carlyle Gifford
- Headquarters: Edinburgh, Scotland, UK
- Key people: Tim Campbell, CEO and managing partner Malcolm MacColl and Amy Atack, managing partners
- AUM: £286.3 billion (2025)
- Number of employees: 1,640 (2025)
- Website: bailliegifford.com

Baillie Gifford & Co is a British investment management firm which is wholly owned by partners, all of whom work within the firm. It was founded in Edinburgh, Scotland, in 1908 and still has its headquarters in the city. In addition to its headquarters in Edinburgh, the firm has offices in Amsterdam, Dublin, Frankfurt, Hong Kong, London, New York, Shanghai, Singapore, Toronto and Zurich.

== History ==
Baillie & Gifford WS was formed in 1907 as a partnership between Lieutenant Colonel Augustus Baillie and Carlyle Gifford. Initially, it was a law firm but the financial climate of the time led to the business switching its emphasis to investment in 1908. In 1909, Baillie & Gifford created the Straits Mortgage and Trust Company Limited to lend money to rubber planters in Malaya and Ceylon.

The Straits Mortgage and Trust Company Limited was renamed The Scottish Mortgage and Trust Limited in 1913, and this was followed by the introduction of several other investment trusts. Baillie Gifford's clients and staff emerged relatively unscathed from the First World War, and the 'Roaring Twenties' gave Gifford many opportunities to expand the firm's investment business. By 1927, the transition of Baillie & Gifford WS from a firm of solicitors conducting institutional investment business to a partnership managing investment trusts was completed with the creation of Baillie Gifford & Co.

Baillie Gifford took over the management of Monks Investment Trust and two other related companies in 1931. The firm continued to grow steadily until the outbreak of the Second World War.

Baillie died in 1939 and, the following year, Gifford was posted to New York on UK Government business. However, the firm survived the war and the troubled investment climate which followed. After a period of strong growth in the firm's staff and client base, Gifford retired in 1965 at the age of 84. Baillie Gifford emerged from a further period of economic weakness in the UK during the 1970s with its position enhanced by growth in the amount of money it managed on behalf of clients.

Assets under management continued to grow strongly during the 1990s. The firm altered the management structure when it reverted to having joint senior partners.

By the time of its centenary in 2008, Baillie Gifford had offices in New York and London in addition to its headquarters in Edinburgh, and was managing more than £50 billion. Clients included five of the seven largest pension funds in the US and the firm had also attracted significant levels of business from Japan and Australia, as well as continuing to make inroads in other parts of the Far and Middle East. Baillie Gifford sponsors the Baillie Gifford Prize for non-fiction books.

In 2015 Baillie Gifford opened an office in Hong Kong under the subsidiary Baillie Gifford Asia (Hong Kong) Limited 百利亞洲(香港)有限公司.

The company launched the Baillie Gifford US Growth Trust in 2018 and, after Baillie Gifford secured the management of Witan Pacific Investment Trust plc in 2020, the latter trust announced that would change its name to the Baillie Gifford China Growth Trust.

=== Notable Investments ===
Baillie Gifford was an early listed-equity investor in Tesla, entering the stock in 2013. In 2021 The Guardian reported they had realised $14.8 billion in profit from Tesla shares sold and held a further $14.6 billion in unrealised gains on retained shares, giving a total Tesla-related gain of $29.5 billion across its funds.

== Sponsorship controversy ==
Baillie Gifford was a long-standing sponsor of literary festivals around the UK. However, in 2023, an open letter signed by over 50 authors threatened to boycott the 2024 Edinburgh International Book Festival because of the firm's investments in "corporations that profit from fossil fuels". In May 2024, both the Edinburgh Book Festival and the Hay Festival announced that they would suspend their sponsorship deals with Baillie Gifford in response to these threats, with Hay referring to "claims raised by campaigners and intense pressure on artists to withdraw". Baillie Gifford disputed the fossil-fuel criticism, saying it was "not a significant fossil fuel investor" and that 2% of clients' money was invested in companies with some business related to fossil fuels, compared with a market average of 11%.

In June, Baillie Gifford announced that it had ended all of its remaining sponsorship deals with literary festivals, funding that amounted to approximately £1M per year. Subsequent coverage reported concerns from organisers at some affected literary festivals that the loss of sponsorship had created funding gaps and could affect programme scale, ticket prices or community outreach work. The winner of the 2024 Baillie Gifford Prize, Richard Flanagan, declared that he would not accept the prize money until Baillie Gifford indicate how they will decrease their association with fossil fuel and put more towards renewable energy.

== See also ==
Investment trusts managed by Baillie Gifford:

- Baillie Gifford Japan Trust
- Baillie Gifford Shin Nippon
- Baillie Gifford US Growth Trust
- Baillie Gifford European Growth Trust
- Edinburgh Worldwide Investment Trust
- Monks Investment Trust
- Pacific Horizon Investment Trust
- Scottish American Investment Company
- Scottish Mortgage Investment Trust
