= Saba Capital Management =

Hedge fund established in 2009

Saba Capital Management, L.P.
- Type: Private
- Industry: Investment management
- Founded: August 2009; 17 years ago
- Founder: Boaz Weinstein
- Headquarters: Chrysler Building, New York City, United States
- Products: Hedge funds
- AUM: $6.1 billion (2025)
- Number of employees: 58 (2025)
- Website: sabacapital.com

Saba Capital Management, L.P. (Saba) is a credit relative value focused hedge fund firm established in 2009. Saba currently manages three core strategies: Multi-Strategy Relative Value, Tail Hedge, and Closed-End Funds.

== History ==
=== Launch ===
Boaz Weinstein was head of a credit proprietary trading group at Deutsche Bank and had gained a lot of experience trading credit default swaps (CDS). In 2006, Weinstein struck an agreement with Anshu Jain where they would move out the group in 2009. In preparation, Weinstein named the group Saba Principal Strategies. Saba is a Hebrew word meaning "grandfather" and is a tribute to Weinstein's grandfather, a survivor of the Warsaw Ghetto during World War II.

In early 2009, Weinstein had left the bank along with 15 members of his team to spin-off the group as a new entity named Saba Capital Management based out of the Chrysler Building in Manhattan. Weinstein was also able to take all of the intellectual property, including trading systems and analytics that the group developed while at Deutsche Bank.

Saba launched its flagship Capital Master Fund in August 2009 with $140–160 million.

=== 2009 to present ===
In 2012, Saba attracted attention after it profited from the 2012 JPMorgan Chase trading loss on account of a failed investment in credit derivatives attributed to a trader at JPMorgan who was later nicknamed the "London Whale".

In 2015, PSP Investments tried to redeem $500 million from Saba and believed it was shortchanged during the process. As a result, in the fall that year, it sued Saba accusing it of self-dealing and mis-marking illiquid fund assets to minimize the redemption. In March 2017, both parties agreed to a settlement with the joint statement that they had "resolved this matter as a commercial dispute involving a good faith disagreement over the valuation of two highly illiquid corporate bonds."

In 2016, Saba profited substantially from capital structure arbitrage trades in Linn Energy and Chesapeake Energy when it successfully backed the bonds in those companies that were highly mispriced relative to the equity.

From 2012 to 2014, Saba suffered from underperformance leading to some investors withdrawing their funds. However it gained 3% in 2015 and 22% in 2016 which attracted new investors. From 2012 to 2017, Saba had an office in London. It was speculated that Brexit might have been a factor in closing the office.

Saba profited during the 2020 stock market crash where it bought inexpensive CDSs on junk-rated companies and sold CDSs on investment-grade companies. For the year 2020, Saba's flagship fund returned 33% while its tail fund returned 99%. In 2021, Risk named Saba hedge fund of year due to its strong performance during the COVID-19 pandemic.

At the end of 2021, Saba had become fourth-biggest SPAC hedge fund investor with $4.26 billion invested. It along with Lighthouse Investment Partners had invested in Digital World Acquisition Corp. which they sold in October 2021 after news had emerged the company was merging with Donald Trump's new media venture. Shares of the company had surged 357%.

In June 2023, Saba launched a lawsuit against 16 closed-end funds over control-share provisions. These funds were run by BlackRock, Franklin Resources, Tortoise Capital Advisors, Adams Funds and FS Investments. Weinstein himself took particular aim at Blackrock where he vocally stated that it was the worst company in the S&P 500 when it came to governance.

In August 2023, Saba worked with Pershing Square Capital Management and Avenue Capital Group in an attempt to acquire Sculptor Capital Management. However the bid at $13.50 a share was rejected stating the group failed to demonstrate that it could complete a transaction. Sculptor eventually agreed to be acquired by Rithm Capital.

In December 2025, Saba blocked a proposed merger between Edinburgh Worldwide Investment Trust (EWIT) and Baillie Gifford US Growth Trust. Saba holds 30% stakes in both trusts. In January 2026, shareholders of EWIT rejected Saba’s proposal to remove its board and install new directors. Saba has criticized EWIT’s sale of SpaceX shares and called for greater transparency while the trust’s board criticized Saba’s activist campaign as disruptive. In April 2026, EWIT shareholders, led by Saba, rejected a proposed tender offer intended to provide liquidity while preserving exposure to SpaceX. EWIT announced that they would consider alternative tender offers proposed by Saba.

Saba successfully removed the trust’s existing board for the third time at the Edinburgh Worldwide AGM on 30 April 2026. In a Regulatory Release the board stated that there had been insufficient votes to re-elect the five independent directors. It added that Saba Capital Management’s three nominated directors would be expected to receive a majority vote. Jonathan Simpson-Dent described it as "a disappointing day" for shareholders.

Saba increased its activist position in the UK with IEM in June 2026. At the Requisitioned General Meeting on 17 th June 2026 shareholders voted in all four of Saba nominees to be on the board of IEM. Caroline Bault, Steven Grey, Jason Chen and Aaron Morris were voted to replace the existing directors. This resulted in a total of approximately 71% of votes for the Saba nominees. This was the ninth time Saba had been successful in its UK Investment Trust campaigns.

Saba’s campaign to unseat Baillie Gifford US Growth Trust encountered another hurdle as shareholders failed to support its bid for a third time on 23 October 2026 during the trust’s annual general meeting. Shareholders voted to reject the election of Saba’s three proposed directors by a majority of 52.8%. Following the vote, the board added that 99.2% of shareholders excluding those who voted for Saba and fellow hedge fund Sessa Capital IM supported the board’s recommendations.
