= Boaz Weinstein =

American businessman

- Born: Boaz Ronald Weinstein; 1973 (age 52–53); New York City, New York, U.S.
- Education: University of Michigan (BA)
- Occupation: Founder of Saba Capital Management
- Spouse: Tali Farhadian (m. 2010; div. 2024)
- Children: 3

Boaz Ronald Weinstein (born 1973) is an American hedge fund manager and founder of Saba Capital Management. He rose to prominence at Deutsche Bank in the early and mid 2000s with his credit default swap and capital structure arbitrage trading strategies. He then formed a proprietary trading group within Deutsche Bank. After leaving the bank in 2009, Weinstein started Saba Capital Management as a separate hedge fund. As of August 2025, Saba manages $6 billion in assets.

Weinstein was among the first to identify and publicize a trading opportunity that was later nicknamed the "London Whale", when a trader at JPMorgan made a number of trades that exposed the firm to about $6.2 billion in losses. The trades in turn netted several hedge funds including Weinstein's hundreds of millions of dollars after they took an opposing position in the credit default swap market.

== Early life and education ==
Weinstein is the son of Giselle and Stanford Weinstein and grew up in a Jewish family on the Upper West Side. His father owned an insurance brokerage and his mother, who had immigrated from Israel, was a translator. He has an older sister, Ilana.

Weinstein first enrolled in a chess workshop at the age of five. At the age of sixteen, he was ranked as a Life Master by the United States Chess Federation and was third in the US for his age group.

Weinstein had an interest in investing from an early age and was a fan of the television program Wall Street Week, hosted by Louis Rukeyser, which his family watched every Friday night. As a junior at the Stuyvesant High School in New York City, he was a winner of a stock-picking contest sponsored by Newsday, beating out a field of about 5000 students. At 15 years old, he began working as an intern at Merrill Lynch, after school and during the summer. He attended the University of Michigan and graduated in 1995 with a degree in philosophy. During one summer, he worked at Goldman Sachs and was mentored by David Delucia, a partner at the firm.

== Career ==
After graduating from college, Weinstein worked for Merrill Lynch at the firm's debt trading desk. In 1997, he joined Donaldson, Lufkin & Jenrette, to which he was recruited by his early mentor Delucia who had transferred from Goldman Sachs. Weinstein began trading floating rate notes – bonds with variable interest rates – just as the credit derivatives market was gaining popularity on Wall Street, significantly changing how the finance industry operated.

=== Deutsche Bank ===
Weinstein joined Deutsche Bank in January 1998, following several traders who moved over to the firm. He became the only person at the bank trading credit default swaps (CDS). Deutsche Bank was interested in expanding its operations in the CDS market having just acquired Bankers Trust, the firm that created credit default swaps in the early 1990s.

During his first year at Deutsche Bank, Weinstein netted significant gains for the German bank during the chaos created by Russia defaulting on its loans and the collapse of Long-Term Capital Management, a hedge fund that was heavily leveraged. He was promoted to vice president of Deutsche Bank in 1999. When Weinstein had begun working at Deutsche Bank, J.P. Morgan was the only other major bank trading in CDS and only a few trades a day occurred in the market. By a decade later, CDS trading had expanded into a multi-trillion-dollar market involving numerous major banks.

Weinstein became one of the most successful traders in the derivatives market. His CDS trading flourished during the most volatile periods, including the 2000–01 California electricity crisis, 2001 Enron scandal, and 2002 WorldCom scandal. Weinstein took the opposite position when AOL Time Warner's stock dropped around the same period. Correctly wagering that the company would not default on its loans, he purchased bonds from the company while hedging his position by shorting the stock. Known as capital structure arbitrage, this is one of Weinstein's main strategies to take advantage of discrepancies in the prices of the several types of securities available for trade on the same company. He made a similar trade in 2005 with General Motors by selling protection on the company's debt using a CDS and at the same time hedging his position by shorting the company's shares. The GM trade for a period appeared to go wrong when the company's stock unexpectedly rose while the CDS plummeted, indicating a loss on both sides. The positions rebounded the following year netting Deutsche Bank a profit on the trade.

In 2001, at the age of 27, Weinstein was promoted to become one of the youngest managing directors in Deutsche Bank's history. By this point, he was managing an internal hedge fund within Deutsche Bank with about $30 billion in positions, and also managing the flow trading desk. His proprietary trading group, which he named Saba in 2007, gained around $900 million in 2006 and $600 million in 2007. Saba reportedly lost as much as $1.8 billion in 2008, Weinstein's only losing year out of his eleven years at Deutsche Bank. By January 2009, it had regained about $600 million.

=== Saba Capital Management ===
In April 2009, Weinstein hired 15 members of his former team to form Saba Capital Management, a credit-focused hedge fund based out of the Chrysler Building in Manhattan. He had left Deutsche Bank two months before, and his former employer had agreed to the move years in advance and to become one of Saba's main brokers. Saba is a Hebrew word meaning "grandfather" and is a tribute to Weinstein's grandfather, a survivor of the Warsaw Ghetto during World War II.

Saba began trading with $140–160 million in funds. By November 2010, the firm had raised $1.8 billion in funds with which to trade and was up 10% that year. In March 2011, Saba was listed as the fastest growing hedge fund in 2010 by Absolute Return + Alpha. Weinstein was also included in Fortune's 40 Under 40 list in 2010 and 2011.

Weinstein profited from the 2012 JPMorgan Chase trading loss. The trader, Bruno Iksil, was selling billions of dollars' worth of notes for the Investment Grade Series 9 10-year Index CDS. Noticing in November 2011 that the price index was lower than Saba's models indicated, Weinstein began buying CDSs on the index although he did not know at the time that the seller was at JPMorgan. In February 2012, Weinstein recommended to a conference of hedge fund managers that they should also keep buying as the seller was continuing to sell. In the end, JPMorgan had reportedly lost $6.2 billion. Weinstein's gains for Saba's clients were estimated between $200 million and $300 million and Saba's assets under management reached a new high of $5.6 billion.

== Philanthropy ==
In 2010, Weinstein endowed the Tali and Boaz Weinstein Foundation to focus on education, with particular attention to poverty, Jewish causes and underprivileged children in New York City. In 2012, he funded renovation work at his alma mater, of Stuyvesant High School.

In May 2020, the Weinsteins donated a total of $2 million to about a dozen nonprofit organizations fighting domestic violence during the COVID-19 pandemic, including Sakhi for South Asian Women, American-Jew Family Support Center, Womankind and Violence Intervention Program.

== Political views ==
Weinstein is a strong supporter of the State of Israel though critical of the government of Benjamin Netanyahu. He rejects the notion of Israel as a colonizer. His connection to the country is familial and historical. His mother is Israeli, and his grandfather (after whom his firm, Saba Capital, is named; Saba means "grandfather" in Hebrew) was a Holocaust survivor who saved other Jews during the Warsaw Ghetto uprising. Following the October 7 attacks, Weinstein was a signatory to the "Asset Manager Community Statement of Support for Israel." This public pledge condemned Hamas, affirmed Israel’s right to self-defense, and committed to supporting Jewish and Israeli employees. However, in signing, the asset managers (including Weinstein) also pledged not to hire anyone involved in Pro-Palestinian protests in the aftermath of the October 7 attacks

== Personal life ==
Weinstein is a skilled poker and blackjack player. He had become interested in blackjack since the early 1990s and learned card counting after reading Edward O. Thorp's Beat the Dealer. He often played with a secretive blackjack team from MIT which has been profiled in the book Bringing Down the House, later adapted into the film 21. Weinstein is reportedly on the blacklist of several casinos as a card counter. In 2005, Warren Buffett invited him to play in a celebrity poker tournament where Weinstein won a Maserati.

In 2010, Weinstein married Tali Farhadian in Manhattan. The pair divorced in 2024. His former wife is a Democrat who served in the Obama Department of Justice and ran for Manhattan District Attorney in 2021. The former couple share three daughters.

In 2012, Weinstein bought a $25.5 million property on Manhattan's Fifth Avenue, from the estate of Huguette Clark.
