= Jupiter Fund Management =

British fund management company

Jupiter Fund Management plc

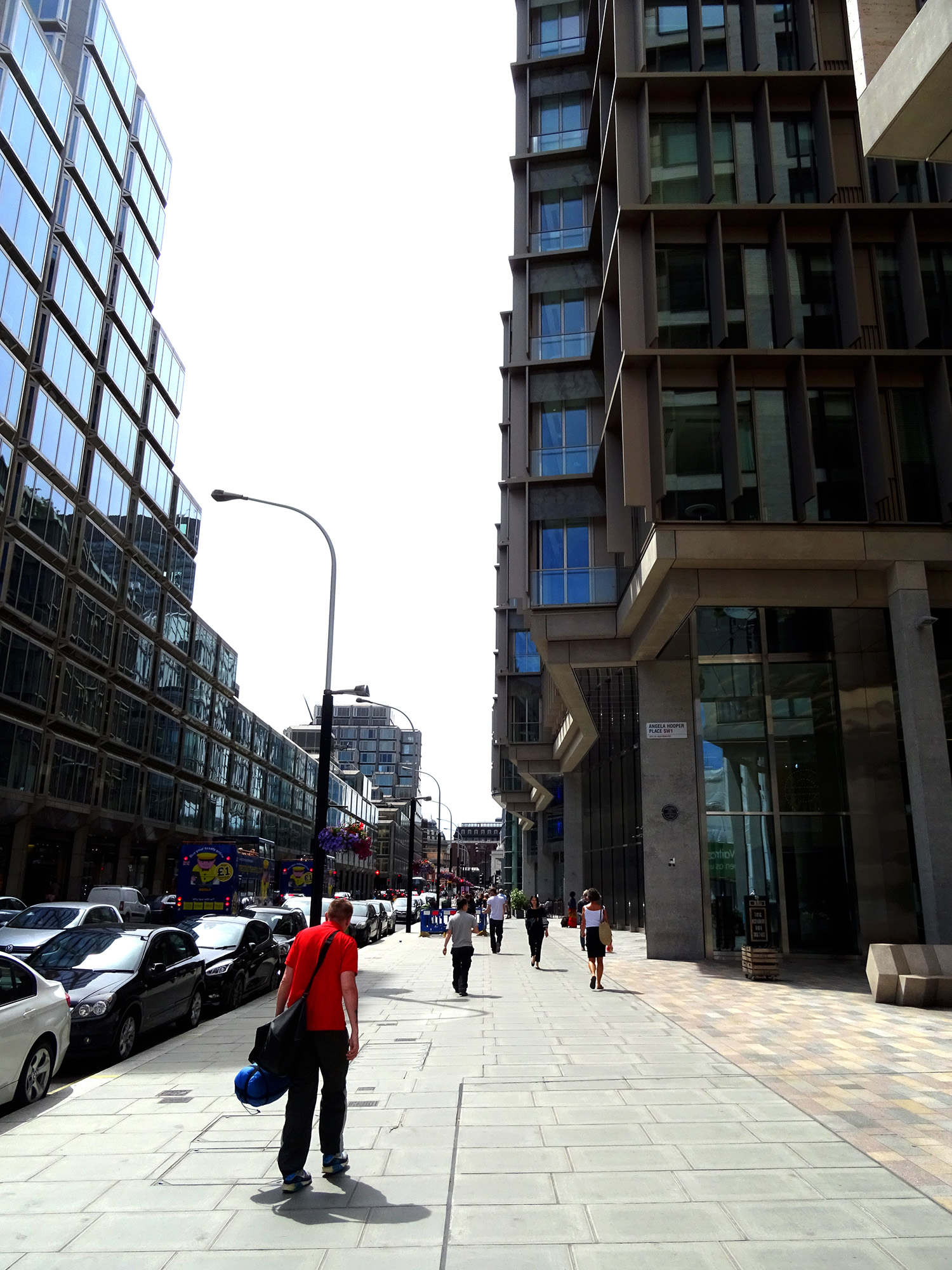
- Headquarters at 70 Victoria Street
- Company type: Public
- Traded as: LSE: JUP; FTSE 250 component
- Industry: Investment management
- Founded: 1985
- Headquarters: London, UK
- Key people: David Cruickshank, Chairman; Matthew Beasley, CEO
- Revenue: ▲£465.7 million (2025)
- Operating income: ▲£128.1 million (2025)
- Net income: ▲£100.4 million (2025)
- AUM: £54.0 billion (2025)
- Website: www.jupiteram.com

Jupiter Fund Management is a UK fund management group, managing equity and bond investments for private and institutional investors. The company manages assets across a wide range of international and UK based mutual funds, investment companies and institutional mandates, as well as providing wealth management services. The Company offers a variety of equity portfolios specialising in markets such as the UK, Europe, Asia and other emerging European nations, as well as multi-manager funds and specialist thematic investments such as absolute return funds, socially responsible investment funds and global financial funds. It also has a growing fixed interest franchise, with a focus on investing in high grade corporate bonds, strategic bonds and convertibles. The company is listed on the London Stock Exchange and is a constituent of the FTSE 250 Index.

== History ==
The company was established by John Duffield in 1985 and later sold to German bank Commerzbank in two tranches in 1995 and 2000. John Duffield left in 2000 after a public row with the company's new owners and set up a rival fund group, New Star Asset Management in 2001. Between 2000 and June 2007 Jupiter was headed by Joint Group Chief Executives Jonathan Carey and Edward Bonham Carter. Jonathan Carey retired in 2010 after 23 years at the company. Between June 2007 and March 2014, Jupiter was headed by Edward Bonham Carter (brother of British actress Helena Bonham Carter).

Jupiter bought itself out from Commerzbank in a management buyout (MBO) in June 2007. Around 95% of the company's staff then became shareholders. US private equity firm TA Associates supported the MBO and held a minority stake in the business. On 21 June 2010, Jupiter floated on the London Stock Exchange at 165p a share. Employees retained around 41% ownership of the Company on the day it listed and TA Associates reinvested in the business, taking its shareholding to around 22% on the day of admission to the London Stock Exchange. In December 2013, it was announced that Edward Bonham Carter would step down as chief executive of Jupiter in March 2014 and be replaced by Maarten Slendebroek.

The company acquired Merian Global Investors for consideration of £370 million in July 2020.

== Key people ==
Jupiter is home to a number of well-known fund managers. John Chatfeild-Roberts joined Jupiter with his team from Lazard Asset Management in 2001: he manages fund of fund portfolios and in February 2010 took over as chief investment officer.
