= English Bicknor =

Village in Gloucestershire, England

Coordinates: 51.838°N 2.609°W

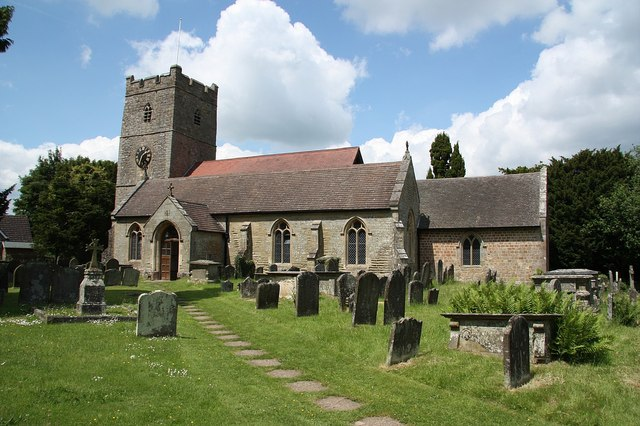
- Parish church of St Mary the Virgin

- Location within Gloucestershire
- Population: 408 (2011 Census)
- OS grid reference: SO581156
- Civil parish: English Bicknor
- District: Forest of Dean
- Shire county: Gloucestershire
- Region: South West
- Country: England
- Sovereign state: United Kingdom
- Post town: Coleford
- Postcode district: GL16
- Dialling code: 01594
- Police: Gloucestershire
- Fire: Gloucestershire
- Ambulance: South Western
- UK Parliament: Forest of Dean
- Website: The Parish of English Bicknor

English Bicknor is a village and civil parish in the Forest of Dean district of west Gloucestershire, England. The 2011 Census recorded the population as 408. The village is near the county boundary with Herefordshire, opposite which is the village of Welsh Bicknor. The two villages are on opposite sides of the River Wye.

== Etymology ==
The name of English Bicknor is first attested in the Domesday Book of 1086 as Bicanofre. The second morpheme of the toponym in the Old English word ōfer ("ridge"). This refers to the ridge at one end of which the village sits. The first morpheme in the name is thought either to be an otherwise unattested Old English word *bica "point" or to be a personal name Bica; thus the name once meant "ridge with a point" or "Bica's ridge".

The parish also contains the place Mailscot, whose name appears to use Welsh elements (though with English word-order) and to have meant "the wood (modern Welsh coed) belonging to a person called Mail".

== History ==
English Bicknor is one of the ancient villages of the Forest of Dean, situated at the top of a hill overlooking the Wye Valley, and once the site of English Bicknor Castle, a motte and bailey castle, the remnants of which can still be seen. Close to the village is Bicknor Court, an imposing house some 400 years old, as well as the Grade II listed Eastbach Court. Situated between Symond's Yat and Lower Lydbrook on high ground opposite its namesake Welsh Bicknor. English Bicknor is first recorded as a hamlet in 1066.

The parish is primarily agricultural and industrial. Its main attraction is the small Norman Church of England parish church of St Mary the Virgin which has notable internal 12th-century stonemasonry and sculpture. The church is in the outer courtyard of the motte-and-bailey castle. Norman masonry has been found in the motte, suggesting at least part was built in stone. Nothing of the castle's structure survives, but its location remains identifiable.

A typical early Norman defence work which is one of many along the Welsh Marches, it is thought to have been built in the reign of Henry I of England (1100–35) or King Stephen (1135–54) and was demolished or destroyed by the late 14th century, but why and how is not known (possibly during the rebellion of Owain Glyndŵr).

== Parish church ==
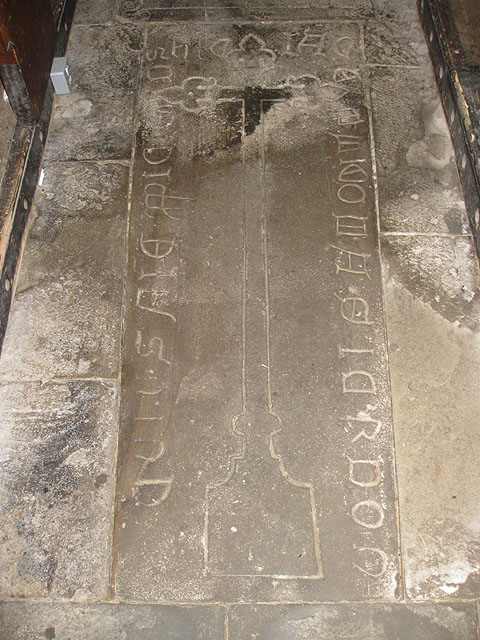
15th-century ledger stone in St Mary's inscribed with Lombardic script

The parish church is Norman, built in the 12th century. It is in an oval churchyard of Anglo-Saxon origin within the outer courtyard of a Norman motte-and-bailey castle. The exterior walls were restored in the Victorian era. Only the exterior stonework of the 13th-century west tower is original. Earlier the church had a crossing tower, but was it built from the soft local sandstone which became unsafe.

Inside the church, both the four-bay north arcade and five-bay south arcade are Norman Romanesque, but their capitals have different decoration. The font is also Norman. The church has also a stained glass window made by Percy Bacon in 1908.

Monuments in the church include a ledger stone from about 1420 with a rare example of Lombardic script that translates "Pray for the soul of our departed brother in Christ". Other monuments include three Mediæval stone figures. Cecilia Muchegros, who lived in the village and died in 1301, and Hawisia, who died in 1353 and whose figure is dressed in a long flowing robe, each have a dog at their feet. The third figure is of a priest, with an old body and a young head. It is not known who he was, but may have been the priest in the church in the early 14th century.

The west tower has a ring of six bells. Abraham I Rudhall of Gloucester cast five bells including the tenor in 1709 and the treble bell in 1718. The church has also a Sanctus bell cast by John Warner & Sons of Cripplegate, London in 1875.

St Mary's is a Grade I listed building.

== Governance ==
The village is in the Christchurch and English Bicknor electoral ward. This ward centres on Christchurch but starts in the north at English Bicknor and includes Staunton Coleford in the southwest. The 2011 Census recorded the ward population as 1,520.
