= Steven Drobny =

American hedge fund advisor and published author

- Born: Steven Edward Drobny
- Education: Bucknell University (B.S.); London School of Economics and Political Science (M.Sc)
- Occupations: Founder & CEO of Clocktower Group

Steven Edward Drobny (born April 29, 1972) is an American hedge fund advisor and published author. He is the founder of Clocktower Group, an alternative investment platform spanning hedge funds, venture capital, and creative solutions for large institutional investors. Clocktower Ventures, Clocktower Group's venture capital platform, has invested in more than 250 companies focused on financial services innovation since 2015. Drobny is the author of The Invisible Hands: Top Hedge Funds on Bubbles, Crashes and Rethinking Real Money (John Wiley & Sons, 2010) and Inside the House of Money: Top Hedge Fund Traders on Profiting in the Global Markets (John Wiley & Sons, 2006)

== Education and career ==
Drobny attended Bucknell University, graduating with a Bachelor of Science in Business Administration. Subsequently, he received a MSc in Finance and Accounting from the London School of Economics and Political Science.

Steven Drobny founded Clocktower Group in 2007 and leads the firm's asset management, consulting and investment advisory business. The firm helps pensions, endowments, family offices, asset managers and other institutional investors run better businesses and build more effective investment portfolios through thoughtful and strategic use of external allocations to global macro and commodity hedge fund managers.

In October 2014, it was announced that Drobny joined the advisory board of Ergo, a global intelligence and advisory firm.

Drobny was formerly with Deutsche Bank in the Hedge Fund Group and also with AIG Trading.

== Books ==
- In 2006, Drobny published his first book, Inside the House of Money: Top Hedge Fund Traders on Profiting in the Global Markets (John Wiley & Sons, 2006), which defined global macro as a strategy, featuring interviews with some of the top hedge fund managers at the time across the breadth of sub-strategies comprised within the broad strategy of global macro. The revised edition includes a foreword by Niall Ferguson. A partial list of interviewees includes Peter Thiel, Scott Bessent, and Jim Rogers.
- In 2010, Drobny published The Invisible Hands: Top Hedge Funds on Bubbles, Crashes and Rethinking Real Money (John Wiley & Sons, 2010), a work born out of the crisis of 2008. In this book, Drobny interviewed macro hedge fund managers who preserved capital or profited through the crisis, focusing on elements of their investment processes that could be incorporated by real money managers (pensions, university endowments, sovereign wealth funds, family offices, charitable foundations, and others). The work was named one of the best business books of 2010 by Bloomberg.
- The New House of Money (John Wiley & Sons, 2014), Drobny's third book, was released on December 3, 2013, through Clocktower Group's website as serialized chapters available for free download. The first chapter is an extended interview with Kyle Bass of Hayman Capital Management . The book features interview discussions with leading hedge fund managers focused on the changes to the global financial landscape since the credit crisis. The serial release format and the emphasis on the evolution of markets in recent years provide a synthesis of Drobny's prior two books.

== Media appearances ==
Steven Drobny has made appearances on Bloomberg Television and is a regular speaker and moderator at hedge fund conferences within the US and Europe.
