= Edinburgh Partners =

Scottish fund management company

Edinburgh Partners Ltd
- Type: Limited Company
- Founded: 2003
- Founder: Dr Sandy Nairn
- Defunct: 19 February 2025
- Fate: Acquired by Franklin Templeton in 2018; dissolved in 2025
- Headquarters: Edinburgh, Scotland, UK
- Website: https://www.edinburghpartners.com/

Edinburgh Partners Ltd (EPL) was an independent fund management company based in Edinburgh, Scotland that specialised in Global, International, EAFE, European and Emerging Market equities. Founded independently in 2003, EPL was a wholly owned subsidiary of Franklin Templeton Investments since 2018. The company was dissolved in February 2025.

== History ==
Established in 2003, EPL is an asset manager focused on managing long-only equities. The first fund was EP Global Opportunities Trust plc, an investment trust launched in December 2003. The Edinburgh Partners Opportunities Fund plc range of open ended pooled funds followed in April 2004 and the range and diversity of products has grown since then.

By 2016, Edinburgh Partners was investing on behalf of a range of clients including pension funds, financial institutions and endowments based around the world. At that time, Edinburgh Partners employed around 60 people and was headquartered in Melville Street, Edinburgh, with further offices in London and North America.

In 2018, Edinburgh Partners was acquired by Franklin Templeton. At the time, EPL managed about £6bn in global equity money.

In October 2021, the CEO of Edinburgh Partners published the book, The End of the Everything Bubble: Why $75 trillion of investor wealth is in mortal jeopardy.

In December 2022, founder Sandy Nairn left Franklin Templeton.

== Leadership ==
- Dr. Sandy Nairn – chief executive officer
- Jamie Mackintosh – Client service & sales
- Ken Fraser – Client relations
- Tom Dickson – Director, client service & sales

== See also ==
- Economy of Scotland
- Everything bubble
- Greenspan put
