= John Duffield =

British financier

John Lincoln Duffield (born 1939) is a British financier. He founded Jupiter Fund Management, one of the largest fund managers operating in London.

== Career ==
The second son of physician and psychiatrist John Elwes Duffield (1910–2009) and his first wife, Jean Edwina (née Stellman), Duffield was educated at Harrow School and then took a degree in biochemistry at the University of Oxford. After this, he went into investment management and, having become manager of his wife's estates, moved to Switzerland as a tax exile.

He founded Jupiter Asset Management in 1985. After selling Jupiter Asset Management to Commerzbank, with Martin Smith he co-founded New Star Asset Management in 2001.

== Family ==
He was married to Vivien Clore but was divorced from her in 1976; they had one son and one daughter. Duffield owns the Marcham Farms estate at Peasemore, Berkshire.
