= Henderson New Star =

British asset management company

Henderson Global Investors
- Industry: Investments
- Founded: 1934; 92 years ago
- Headquarters: London, UK
- Number of employees: 930
- Website: www.henderson.com

Henderson New Star was established in April 2009 when Henderson Group acquired New Star Asset Management and rebranded its UK retail business. Henderson New Star was rebranded Henderson Global Investors in April 2010.

It manages a various funds with particular strengths in equities, fixed income, commercial property, multi-manager and sustainable and responsible investing (SRI).

Its fund managers included Bill McQuaker, Richard Pease, John Pattullo and James Gledhill.

New Star Asset Management was co-founded in 2001 by John Duffield and Martin G. Smith.

The Henderson New Star company merged with US-domiciled Janus Capital Group in 2017 to form Janus Henderson.
