= International Centre for Financial Regulation =

The International Centre for Financial Regulation (ICFR) (2009–12) was a UK-based non-partisan organisation focused entirely on financial regulation that operated between 2009 and 2012.

== History ==
IFCR was the product of a collaboration between a number if international financial services institutions and the UK Government. The ICFR wanted to provide research, events and training on financial regulation whilst also acting as a catalyst for dialogue, thought leadership and scholarship in this critical area. The ICFR’s stated focus was to "shape regulatory thinking that not only addresses – but also anticipates – the evolution of financial markets at a global level, to bring consistency and cooperation between global regulators and policy makers through pro-active discussions, working groups and long-term research." The Centre also meant to support practical training initiatives on best practice and the latest regulatory changes both in developed and emerging markets.

It was put into administration in late 2012, as a member of the management had been suspended after a "substantial" sum of money "appeared to have been removed from the organisation’s bank accounts" without the permission of the centre's board.

On 21 January 2014, the ICFR's Chief Operating Officer Charles Taylor appeared at City of London Magistrates' Court charged with fraud by abuse of position in relation to the internal theft of almost £600,000 and false accounting. Taylor committed suicide in September 2015.

== Structure ==
Board members

- David Currie – Chairman
- Barbara Ridpath – Chief Executive
- Non-Executive Directors: Michel Prada, Stuart Overend, Charles Taylor

Founder members of the ICFR

- 3i
- Aberdeen Asset Management
- Aviva
- Bank of America Merrill Lynch
- Barclays Bank Plc
- Citigroup
- City of London Corporation
- Clifford Chance
- Deloitte
- Ernst & Young
- Her Majesty’s Government
- HSBC
- KPMG
- Morgan Stanley
- PriceWaterhouseCoopers
- Prudential plc
- Standard Chartered
- UBS

== See also ==
- International Organization of Securities Commissions
- Centre for the Study of Financial Innovation
- New Financial
