= Oxford Science Enterprises =

Venture Capital Firm in Oxford, United Kingdom

- Formerly: Oxford Sciences Innovation (OSI)
- Type: Private company
- Industry: Venture Capital
- Predecessor: IP Group
- Founded: 2015; 11 years ago
- Founder: David Norwood and Oxford University
- Headquarters: Oxford, United Kingdom
- Area served: Oxford
- Key people: Ed Bussey (CEO); David Norwood (cofounder)
- AUM: $800M (2022)
- Website: oxfordscienceenterprises.com

Oxford Science Enterprises (OSE) (Previously known as Oxford Sciences Innovation) is a British early-stage venture capital firm with over $800M in AUM based in Oxford, UK. It operates in partnership with the University of Oxford, as the university's preferred investor, several prominent financiers back the firm, including Google Ventures, Sequoia Capital, Tencent, Huawei and Invesco.

The firm uses academic research from the university's science departments to form commercial businesses, also known as spin-outs.

== History ==
The company was founded as Oxford Sciences Innovation (OSI) in 2015 by David Norwood, who was previously the founder of the IP Group, which initially invested only in spinoffs from the university's chemistry department. Oxford Sciences Enterprises initially raised £600m from investors, which included Lansdowne Partners and Google Ventures. Google Ventures partners Tom Hulme and Dr Krishna Yeshwant also joined OSI's advisory board, along with Google AI researcher Demis Hassabis, founder of DeepMind.

Charles Conn, previously CEO of the Rhodes Trust and former McKinsey partner, was appointed CEO in March 2019. Former Google CFO Patrick Pichette joined him as Chair of the board. However, Conn departed in November 2019 and Pichette shortly after. OSI's CFO became acting CEO until the appointment of Alexis Dormandy, another former McKinsey partner, in October 2020

In July 2019, The company announced an investment from Chinese telecommunications company Huawei of £4.1m in OSI shares (approximately 0.7% of the total fund).

In September 2023 Ed Bussey was named CEO of the company, and at the same time Jack Edmondson was appointed to the newly created role of CIO.

== Structure ==
OSE is structured differently from other venture capital firms, being an evergreen patient capital, privately held company and not bound by a limited partnership agreement. As such, the company holds long-term investments, pursuing a patient capital model. OSE differentiates itself from classic venture firms because of its relationship with the university. Unlike most university-linked venture firms, Oxford University is a shareholder in the company, with OSE, in most cases, receiving half of the university's equity stake in the spinout.

OSE works with the university's technology transfer office, Oxford University Innovation, which manages the intellectual property and patent estate of the university and the university's shareholdings in the spinout companies.
