= Mark Tucker (businessman) =

English businessman (born 1957)

Sir Mark Tucker

Chairman of HSBC
- In office 1 October 2017 – 1 October 2025
- Preceded by: Douglas Flint
- Succeeded by: Brendan Nelson (interim)

Board Chairman TheCityUK
- Incumbent
- Assumed office 1 June 2019
- Preceded by: John McFarlane

President of the AIA Group Limited
- In office 1 January 2011 – 1 June 2017
- Succeeded by: Ng Keng Hooi

Chairman of the AIA Group Limited
- In office 12 October 2010 – 1 January 2011
- Succeeded by: Edmund Tse

CEO of the AIA Group Limited
- In office 12 October 2010 – 1 June 2017
- Succeeded by: Ng Keng Hooi

CEO of the Prudential plc
- In office 2005–2009
- Succeeded by: Tidjane Thiam

Personal details
- Born: 29 December 1957 (age 68) England
- Education: University of Leeds
- Occupation: Group Chairman

Sir Mark Edward Tucker (born 29 December 1957) is a British businessman, best known for his various roles at Prudential plc, where he was the CEO until September 2009.

== Early life ==
Mark Tucker started adult life as a trainee professional footballer, making appearances for Wolverhampton Wanderers, Rochdale and Barnet, although he never played a first team match.

== Career ==
After retiring from professional football, Tucker studied Business Management at the University of Leeds. He then qualified as an accountant at PricewaterhouseCoopers.

He joined Prudential plc in 1986, initially working for Prudential Portfolio Managers. He progressed through various roles in the UK, Hong Kong, and the US, where he was a senior vice president at Jackson National Life from 1992 to 1993. He was appointed chief executive of Prudential Corporation Asia and an executive director of Prudential plc, but left the group in May 2004 after growing frustrated at the lack of upward opportunity at Prudential to join HBOS as finance director.

Following Jonathan Bloomer's ousting as CEO of Prudential in early 2005, due to bungled attempts to merge with American General and sell off Egg, Tucker rejoined Prudential in March 2005 as CEO. In March 2009 it was announced he will step down at the end of September 2009, Tucker stating he had achieved all that he wanted to achieve in the role and the decision to leave was "entirely personal". He does not intend to retire, stating "There’s at least one more big job in me". Tucker is a member of the board of directors of Goldman Sachs. He served as the CEO and president of Asian focus insurer AIA Group from June 2009 to September 2017, where he successfully led the former Asian assurance arm of New York-based American International Group (AIG) for an IPO on the Hong Kong Stock Exchange in October 2010. It raised approximately HK$159.08 billion (US$20.51 billion), the world's third largest IPO ever.

Tucker was appointed to the board as a non-executive director and group chairman-designate of HSBC on 1 September 2017. He became non-executive group chairman on 1 October 2017, succeeding executive chairman Douglas Flint, who retired.

In June 2019, Tucker was appointed board chairman of the private-sector membership body and industry advocacy group TheCityUK, succeeding John McFarlane.

In February 2023, he was named a member of the McKinsey & Company External Advisory Group.

== Personal life ==
Tucker lives in New York with his wife, Janet, and two children, as of November 2022. During Tucker's time with AIA, the company became Premier League team Tottenham Hotspur's shirt main sponsor. He was knighted in the 2024 King's Birthday Honours "for services to the economy".

Business positions
Preceded by Douglas Flint (As Executive Group Chairman)	Group Chairman of HSBC; 2017 – Present	Succeeded by Incumbent
