= MTL Index =

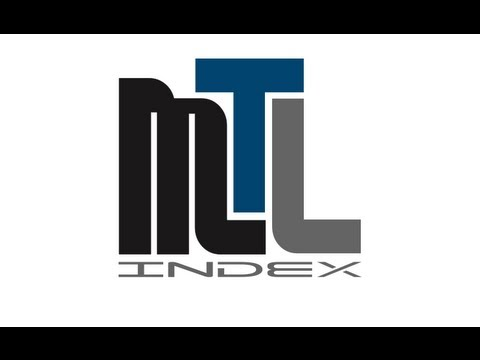
- Founded: 2013 in Bordeaux, France
- Headquarters: Paris
- Area served: International
- Founders: Serge Regnier and Fabien Toulorge
- Services: strategic metals trading specialist
- Website: mtlindex.com

MTL Index was a French company dedicated to the sale of strategic metals and rare earths. The company developed in Italy, Sweden, Switzerland, Spain and Dubai but seems to be defunct. The last newsletter on the company's website dates from January 2016. The index is composed of companies that are involved in the exploration, development, and production of metals and minerals, including gold, silver, copper, iron ore, and other resources. The index is calculated by the Toronto Stock Exchange (TSX) and is intended to serve as a benchmark for the performance of the metals and mining sector in Canada. The MTL Index has been in existence since the late 1990s and includes some of the largest and most well-known mining companies in Canada, such as Teck Resources, Barrick Gold, and Kinross Gold.

== History ==
Created in June 2013 in Bordeaux by Serge Regnier and Fabien Toulorge with a registered capital of 100,000 €, 3 September 2013 MTL Index establishes its headquarters in Paris in the 17th district while retaining the Bordeaux office.

MTL Index offers to anyone wishing to make an investment, to acquire rare earths such as terbium, dysprosium, neodymium. These metals are necessary for any modern and future technology such as smartphones, tablets, televisions, computers, medical scanners, wind turbines, satellites, aircraft engines and instrumentation, banknotes.

== Strategy development ==
Several offices abroad amounted to reach an international clientele and thus increase the amount of stored metal. Barcelona in Spain, Stockholm, Sweden, Finland, Denmark, Norway, Milan for Italy, Geneva in Switzerland, and Dubai for Middle Eastern countries.

In January 2015 a department dedicated to Wealth Management Firms (CGP) is created. The CGP can offer financial products backed by a real stock of rare earths.

== Investor Warning ==
In April 2016, the French financial authority AMF issues a warning to potential investors about MTL Index. The French courts opened an investigation for fraud, but following an international rogatory commission enabling them to check the metals stored in Germany, it turned out that all the orders had been delivered to the customers. The charges were dropped against MTL Index, but as it was unable to continue its business during the investigation, it had to close down, leaving more than 1,000 customers to fend for themselves. These customers are still in possession of their metals.
