= IRSG =

IRSG may refer to:

- Information Retrieval Specialist Group, a specialist group of the British Computer Society promoting Information Retrieval
- Internet Research Steering Group
- International Regulatory Strategy Group A City of London group whose purpose is "to contribute to the shaping of the international regulatory regime, at global, regional and national levels"
