= Financial Services Trade and Investment Board =

The Financial Services Trade and Investment Board (FSTIB) is a partnership organization between the UK Government and British industry. It is part of HM Treasury department. The Board meets on a quarterly basis to develop high-growth initiatives such as Renminbi internationalisation, green finance and financial technology. Its aim is to strengthen Britain's position as the centre of global finance and deliver jobs and growth across the country.

The FSTIB works closely with the Financial Services Organisation (FSO). The FSO is a key delivery partner for the FSTIB's initiatives.

== History ==
The FSTIB was formed by Chancellor George Osborne in Budget 2013 to promote the UK's financial services industry. The Board first met on 8 October 2013 and was charged with leading the government's drive to promote external trade, attract inward investment and lift market access barriers for the UK's financial services sector.

In July 2015, the Chancellor re-launched the FSTIB with a new board composed of senior representatives from across government and industry.

== Achievements ==
- establishing the UK as the centre for Renminbi business outside China
- developing the UK as a western hub for Islamic finance
- delivering the Investment Management Strategy to create a simpler tax regime for the sector
- launching the Insurance Growth Action Plan (GAP) to expand British insurers into key emerging markets
- cementing the UK's world-leading position in financial technology

== Membership ==
The Economic Secretary to the Treasury, Simon Kirby, chairs the quarterly board meetings.

Members include:

- Helena Morrissey, Chair, Newton, and Chair, Investment Association
- John McFarlane, Chairman, Barclays
- Inga Beale, CEO, Lloyd's of London
- Nathan Bostock, CEO, Santander UK
- Miles Celic, CEO, TheCityUK
- Xavier Rolet, CEO, London Stock Exchange
- Sir Gerry Grimstone, Chairman, Standard Life
- Mark Garnier, Parliamentary Under Secretary of State, Department for International Trade
- Charles Roxburgh, Second Permanent Secretary, Financial Services, HM Treasury
- Deborah Bronnert, Director General, Economic and Consular, Foreign and Commonwealth Office
- Katharine Braddick, Director, Financial Services, HM Treasury
- Rob Ward, Deputy Director, Financial Services, HM Treasury
