= Diploma of Financial Studies =

The Level 3 Diploma in Financial Studies is an educational qualification in finance offered principally in the United Kingdom. It counts for up to 140 UCAS tariff points depending on the grade, making it the equivalent to an A2 A-level albeit with an "A" grade being the highest attainable. It consists of three examinations taken throughout the year. The exams for the first two modules can either be completed using a computer or pen and paper and are marked electronically, these exams are multiple choice whereas the last module is a written exam involving case studies. The Diploma can only be achieved once the Certificate in Financial Studies has been taken which contains 3 of the 6 units which make up the Diploma. The certificate is equivalent to an AS-level. The Diploma in Financial Studies is produced by The London Institute of Banking & Finance.
