= Charles R. Conn =

CEO, investor, author (born 1961)

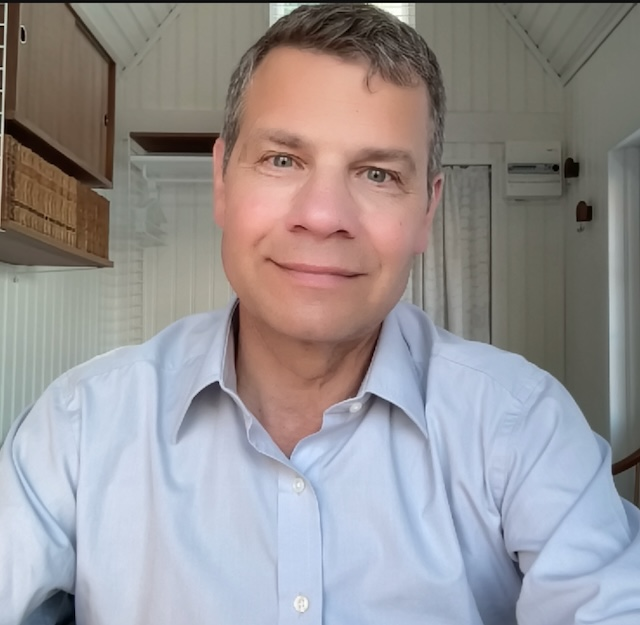
- Born: 22 August 1961 (age 65)
- Education: Boston University; Balliol College, Oxford; Harvard Business School
- Occupation: Chair (officer)
- Notable work: Bulletproof Problem Solving: The One Skill That Changes Everything; The Imperfectionists: Strategic Mindsets for Uncertain Times
- Board member of: Patagonia, Inc.

CEO of Oxford Sciences Innovation
- In office 2019–2020
- Preceded by: David Norwood

Warden of Rhodes House, Oxford
- In office 2013–2018
- Preceded by: Andrew Graham
- Succeeded by: Elizabeth Kiss

Senior Advisor to the Gordon & Betty Moore Foundation
- In office 2001–2013

CEO & Chairman, Ticketmaster Online-Citysearch
- In office 1998–2001

Co-Founder & CEO, Citysearch
- In office 1995–1998
- Website: Profile

Charles R. Conn (born 22 August 1961) is a Canadian and American CEO, conservationist and author. In 2021 he co-founded and is partner of Monograph, a life sciences venture firm. In 2019 he was the CEO of Oxford Sciences Innovation. Previously, he was the warden and global CEO of Rhodes House and the Rhodes Trust, the organization responsible for administering the Rhodes Scholarship from 2013 to 2018.

He is a board member of Patagonia, Inc., of which he also served as chair from 2019 to 2026.

== Biography ==
Conn studied at Boston University's University Professors Program before reading philosophy, politics and economics at Balliol College, Oxford, as a Rhodes Scholar from Massachusetts. Conn subsequently worked at the Boston Consulting Group and gained an MBA at Harvard Business School.

Conn was a partner at McKinsey & Company.^{[3]} He co-founded Citysearch in 1995, Conn oversaw the merger with Ticketmaster, acquisition of Match.com and the company’s public share offering. He became chairman of Ticketmaster Online-Citysearch in 2001.

Conn subsequently worked as senior advisor to the Gordon & Betty Moore Foundation^{[2]} where his projects included the preservation of wild salmon ecosystems and the Palmyra Atoll research station.

He is a Henry Crown Fellow of the Aspen Institute. Conn also sits or has sat on several company and non-profit boards or advisory committees, including Patagonia, The Nature Conservancy European Council, the Arcadia Foundation, the Oxford Internet Institute, Trout Unlimited, and the Atlantic Salmon Federation.^{[2]}

Conn is the author of two books on strategic problem solving, and is published in Harvard Business Review, Fortune, Stanford Social Innovation Review and other journals.

== Rhodes Trust ==
Conn was warden and CEO of the Rhodes Trust from June 2013 to August 2018. He was the first American to hold this position, and the first Warden of Rhodes House not to have served previously on the University of Oxford faculty.

During his time as CEO of Rhodes House, Conn led a project to transform the Rhodes Trust into a 21st-century institution. This involved raising in excess of £250 million to secure the endowment for existing country scholarships and expand the scholarships globally. During his time as warden the annual number of scholars increased from 83 to 101, adding China, UAE, Syria, Jordan, Lebanon, Palestine, Israel, Saudi Arabia, Singapore, Malaysia, East Africa, West Africa and new global Rhodes Scholarships.

During Conn’s tenure, the Trust started a convening program of current and alumni fellows on character, service, and leadership. The Trust also pioneered several new partnerships, including with Atlantic Philanthropies to set up the Atlantic Institute and with the Eric & Wendy Schmidt Fund for Strategic Innovation to establish Schmidt Science Fellows.^{[16]} After moving to Oxford, Conn became a trustee of the Mandela Rhodes Foundation in Cape Town, South Africa, and an advisory board member of the Oxford Internet Institute.^{[17]} In January 2014, he became a Professorial Fellow of Balliol College, Oxford University.^{[18]} Conn announced his retirement as warden of Rhodes House for the end of his five-year term, in August 2018.^{[19]}

== Oxford Sciences Innovation ==
In March 2019, Conn was appointed CEO of Oxford Sciences Innovation, the £600 million investment company formed in partnership with the University of Oxford to develop the University’s deep science and technology ideas. He was joined by new Board Director Patrick Pichette, former CFO of Google. Both he and Pichette departed OSI towards the end of 2019.

== Publications ==
Title	Publisher	Year
The Imperfectionists: Strategic Mindsets for Uncertain Times	Wiley (publisher)	2023
In Uncertain Times, Embrace Imperfectionism	Harvard Business Review	2023
Bulletproof Problem Solving: The One Skill That Changes Everything	Wiley (publisher)	2019
Thinking About Historical Legacies: Looking for Just Principles and Processes	The Institute for Historical Justice & Reconciliation	2018
Conservation Biology through the Lens of a Career in Salmon Conservation	Conservation Biology (journal)	2011
Robbing the Grandchildren: Foundations’ shortsightedness is jeopardizing the planet’s future	Stanford Social Innovation Review	2007
Staircases to growth (co-author)	McKinsey Quarterly	1996
