= TheCityUK =

Industry advocacy group in the UK

- Formation: 2010
- Legal status: Non-profit company
- Headquarters: London EC3
- Region served: United Kingdom
- Board Chairman: Omar Ali CBE, Global Financial Services Leader of EY
- Leadership Council Chairman: Dame Anne Richards, Chief Executive Officer of Fidelity International
- Chief Executive: Miles Celic
- Staff: 50
- Website: TheCityUK

TheCityUK is a private-sector membership body and industry advocacy group promoting the financial and related professional services industry of the United Kingdom (UK). TheCityUK is often referred to as the industry's "most powerful" or "most prominent" lobbyists with close links to the UK Government and to policymakers in Brussels and Washington.

Although 'The City' in the UK usually refers to the City of London, one of the world's foremost financial centres, the organisation also represents the industry throughout the UK. As a business-led body, TheCityUK is distinct from the City of London Corporation which is the local government administrative body for the district of London which contains the traditional heart of the city's financial services industry, sometimes referred to as the Square-Mile.

The organisation focuses on three main areas:

- Overseas promotion: it promotes the UK overseas as a world-class centre for financial and related professional services.
- Domestic promotion: it encourages greater understanding of, and support for, the financial services industry in the UK.
- Regulation and trade: it supports industry efforts to work with government and regulators, to ensure that regulatory developments and trade policy foster free and open markets for the UK's financial services industry.

TheCityUK also conducts primary research among members, businesses and consumers about relevant financial and professional services issues and produces a range of authoritative economic reports on industry sectors, products, and key financial indicators.

== History ==
In June 2008, the then Mayor of London, Boris Johnson, launched the Review of the Competitiveness of London's Financial Centre, chaired by former Merrill Lynch EMEA Chairman Bob Wigley, and asked its authors to make clear recommendations on how the capital could best sustain and strengthen its reputation as the “global capital of finance”. A recommendation of this review was the formation of a new body to bring together existing overlapping financial and related professional services groups. This body would be tasked with promoting London's financial services sector overseas, anticipating strategically important trends and highlighting to the domestic audience the industry's contribution to the UK.

In 2009 a second and separate report from a group of industry representatives chaired by then UK Chancellor, Alistair Darling, and former Citigroup chairman, Sir Winfried Bischoff, recommended the creation of a new independent body to ‘promote the industry at home and overseas’. The report also recommended the group should have a ‘formal link’ to a forum, led by government, which would focus on strategic issues relating to the financial industry. Based on this recommendation TheCityUK was founded in 2010 under the chairmanship of Sir Winfried Bischoff. The founding Chief Executive was Chris Cummings. The report also led to the founding of Financial Services Trade and Investment Board, a partnership body sitting between the UK government and industry.

In June 2018, then Chancellor of the Exchequer Philip Hammond announced the creation of a Financial Services Skills Taskforce to assess the long-term skills needs of the UK financial services sector, amid rapid technological and social change.

The taskforce was convened by TheCityUK, with support from the City of London Corporation. As a result of the taskforce's findings, the Financial Services Skills Commission was formed in May 2020 with TheCityUK a founding, permanent member.

== TheCityUK Boards and committees ==
=== Board of directors ===
- Omar Ali CBE (Board Chair, TheCityUK) (Global Financial Services Leader, EY)
- Hannah Gurga (Director General, Association of British Insurers)
- Adam Farkas (Chief Executive Officer, Association for Financial Markets in Europe)
- Jon Whitehouse (Group Head of Government Relations, Barclays)
- Sarah Melvin (Head of UK, BlackRock)
- Christopher Hayward (Chairman of Policy and Resources Committee, City of London Corporation)
- Sir William Russell (Alderman, City of London Corporation)
- Omar Ali (Managing Partner, EMEIA Financial Services, Ernst & Young)
- Baroness Swinburne (Vice-Chair of Financial Services, KPMG)
- Sir Edward Braham (Chairman, M&G)
- Galina Dimitrova (Director, Investment &Capital Markets, The Investment Association)
- Miles Celic (Chief Executive, TheCityUK)
- David Postings (Chief Executive, UK Finance)
- John Heaps (Chairman, Yorkshire Building Society)

=== TheCityUK Leadership Council ===
TheCityUK Leadership Council brings together a cross-sectoral group of the most senior leaders from the industry. The Leadership Council oversees TheCityUK's strategy and its members lead on major programmes of work. These meetings are regularly attended by Government Ministers, senior regulators, Ambassadors and other leading stakeholders. The current Chair of the Leadership Council is Bruce Carnegie-Brown (Chairman of Lloyd's of London).

=== TheCityUK senior committees ===
==== Long-Term Competitiveness Group ====
TheCityUK Long-Term Competitiveness Group is responsible for influencing the policy environment and evolution of regulatory frameworks to ensure the UK remains an internationally attractive and domestically competitive place for financial and related professional services firms to do business. It is focused on the future shape of the UK's regulatory, legal, mobility and tax regimes and the approach of its regulatory and supervisory authorities.

==== International Regulatory Strategy Group (IRSG) ====
The International Regulatory Strategy Group (IRSG) is one of the leading cross-sectoral groups in Europe for the industry, discussing and acting on regulatory developments. It comprises senior leaders from across the UK-based financial and related professional services industry. The IRSG is jointly run by TheCityUK and the City of London Corporation to promote sustainable economic growth and an international framework that facilitates open and competitive capital markets globally Its role includes identifying strategic issues where a cross-sectoral position can add value to existing industry views. The IRSG Council is currently chaired by Baroness Swinburne (Vice Chair of Financial Services, KPMG UK).

The IRSG Council which sets the high level strategic direction for the IRSG and the IRSG Board which sets the priorities for the IRSG and oversees delivery of its work programme.

==== International Trade and Investment Group (ITIG) ====
TheCityUK International Trade & Investment Group (ITIG) sets the strategic direction for international engagement for UK-based financial and related professional services firms. The group oversees all of TheCityUK's internationally focused workstreams. ITIG is focused on delivering an international strategy it commissioned to see the UK become the world's leading international financial centre through collaboration between industry, government and regulators to promote the UK's international competitiveness. It is a cross-sectoral senior practitioner body composed of members of TheCityUK.

==== Public Affairs Group (PAG) ====
TheCityUK Public Affairs Group (PAG) brings together senior leaders in government relations, public affairs and communications, drawn from our membership and representing a diversity of sectors, to develop and implement a programme of work aligned to our strategic objective on trust and reputation. It also it oversees the work and direction of TheCityUK's public affairs programme, including its engagement with the devolved administrations of the UK's regions and nations and in Westminster.

=== TheCityUK Working Groups ===
- Islamic Finance Sectoral Advisory Group
- Legal Services Sectoral Advisory Group
- US Technical Working Group

=== TheCityUK Market Advisory Groups ===
- ASEAN Market Advisory Group
- China Market Advisory Group
- Eurasia, Middle East & Africa Market Advisory Group
- India-UK Financial Partnership
- Japan Market Advisory Group
- Switzerland Market Advisory Group
- US Market Advisory Group

== See also ==
- Centre for the Study of Financial Innovation
- New Financial
- UK Finance
