= Annabelle Bond =

British mountain climber

Annabelle Bond OBE (born 1969) is a British socialite, international adventurer and activist, who came to prominence after climbing the summit of Mount Everest on 15 May 2004, making her the fourth British woman to do so.

In 2005 she became the fastest woman and fourth-fastest person to ever climb all Seven Summits, when she climbed them in 360 days. Her televised climb of Everest portrayed her as the glamorous blonde who brought her lipstick to the summit of Everest.

She heads the Eve Appeal to raise money for ovarian cancer. She is the daughter of British banker Sir John Bond.

On 17 June 2006 Bond was appointed an OBE (Civil Division) for services to mountaineering and to the Eve Appeal.

Bond has a daughter with Warren Lichtenstein and has become a successful child support plaintiff, obtaining an order for more than $500,000 per year from a Hong Kong court.
