= Stephen Green, Baron Green of Hurstpierpoint =

British politician (born 1948)

The Reverend and Right Honourable Prebendary The Lord Green of Hurstpierpoint
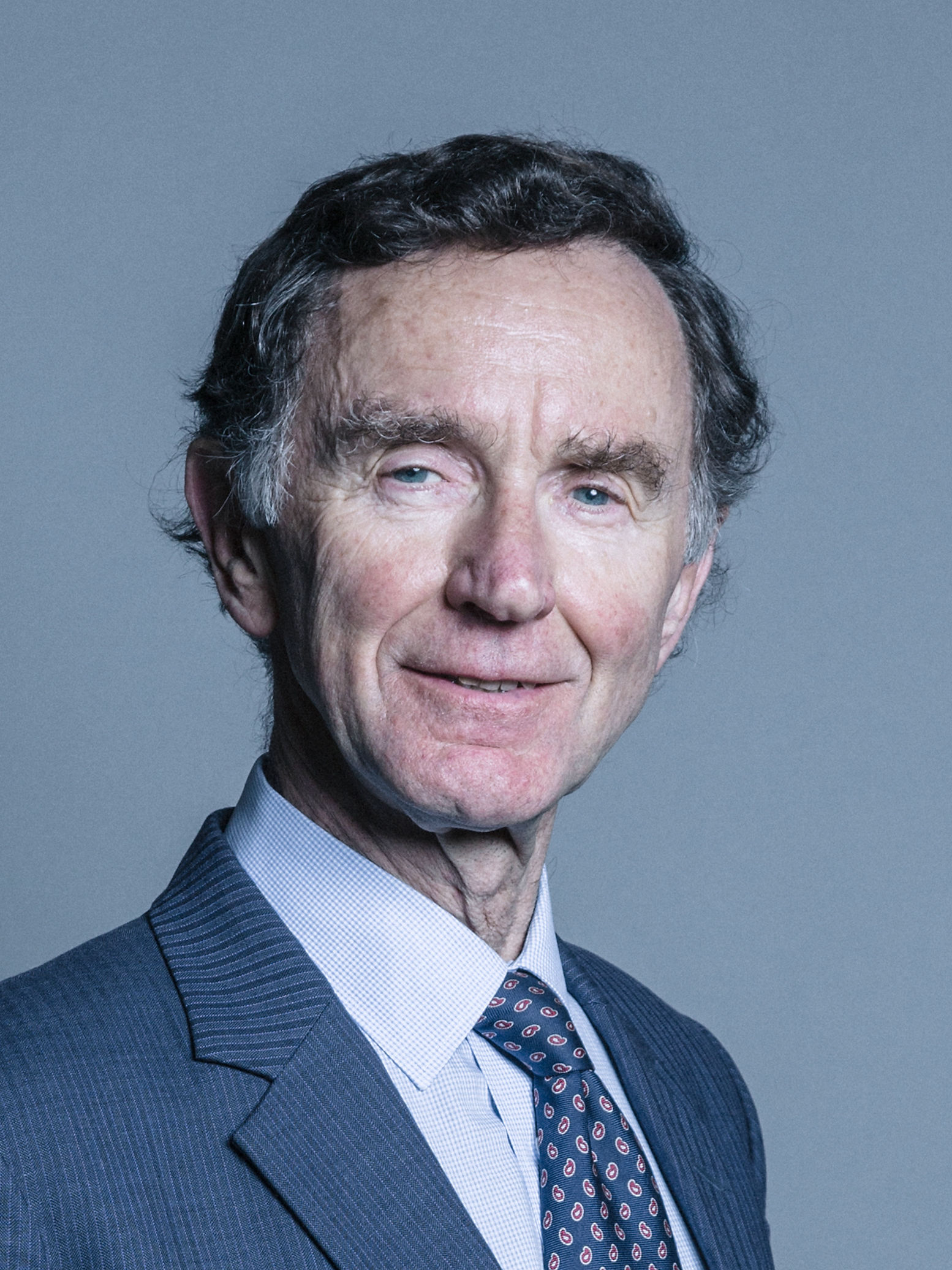
- Official portrait, 2018

Minister of State for Trade and Investment
- In office 11 January 2011 – 11 December 2013
- Prime Minister: David Cameron
- Preceded by: Mark Prisk
- Succeeded by: The Lord Livingston of Parkhead

Group chairman of HSBC Group
- In office 26 May 2006 – 3 December 2010
- Preceded by: John Bond
- Succeeded by: Douglas Flint

Group chief executive of HSBC Group
- In office 1 June 2003 – 26 May 2006
- Preceded by: Keith Whitson
- Succeeded by: Michael Geoghegan

Member of the House of Lords
- Lord Temporal
- Life peerage 16 November 2010

Personal details
- Born: 7 November 1948 (age 77)
- Party: Non-affiliated (formerly Conservative)
- Spouse: Janian
- Children: 2
- Education: Exeter College, Oxford; Massachusetts Institute of Technology
- Profession: Banker; Politician; Clergyman

Stephen Keith Green, Baron Green of Hurstpierpoint (born 7 November 1948), is a British politician, former Conservative Minister of State for Trade and Investment, former group chairman of HSBC Holdings plc, and Anglican priest.

== Early life and education ==
Stephen Green was born on 7 November 1948 to Dudley Keith Green and Dorothy Rosamund Mary Green (née Wickham). After a private education at Lancing College, near his family home in Brighton, he attended Exeter College, Oxford, obtaining a degree in Philosophy, Politics and Economics (PPE) in 1966. Green's parents were active churchgoers and influenced his religious activities both as a young man and later in life; after graduating he spent a year volunteering in the East End of London at a hostel for recovering alcoholics, a move also reputedly influenced by a visit from a Church of England vicar. It was during his time at the hostel that he met Janian Joy, a fellow volunteer, whom he married in 1971. In 1975 (during a Harkness Fellowship, on secondment from the Overseas Development Administration) Green also obtained a master's degree from the Massachusetts Institute of Technology (MIT).

== Career ==
In 1971, Green began his professional life as a civil servant in the British government's Ministry of Overseas Development (now the Foreign, Commonwealth and Development Office), where he spent the next six years. In 1977, he joined McKinsey & Co Inc. management consultants, with whom he undertook assignments in Europe, North America and the Middle East.

As a result of being headhunted, Green joined the then Hongkong and Shanghai Banking Corporation in 1982, initially on a two-year contract, with responsibility for corporate planning activities. In 1985 he was put in charge of the development of the bank's global treasury operations, and in 1992 became group treasurer of HSBC Holdings plc with responsibility for the HSBC Group's treasury and capital markets businesses globally.

In March 1998 Green was appointed to the board of HSBC Holdings plc as executive director of Investment Banking and Markets, responsible for the investment banking, private banking and asset management activities of the Group. He assumed additional responsibility for the group's corporate banking business in May 2002. As executive director, Green cancelled all executive bonuses in both 2001 and 2002, telling The Wall Street Journal in March 2003: "We took the view that a business that had not performed for the shareholder couldn't expect to receive bonuses". The decision saw some key staff leave in protest but it also won the company some praise; Institutional Investor magazine quoted HSBC's then chairman, Sir John Bond, as saying: "We had corporate clients come up to us and say, 'Thank God you've taken a stand'".

In the year before becoming chief executive, Green earned below £1m; HSBC's annual report for the period showed that none of the company's five top-earning employees was a board member. Green told The Guardian in October 2003: "Plenty of people in this organisation earn more than me. I genuinely don't care. I can hardly be described as lowly paid. Since when was money the be-all and end-all?" Asked by the newspaper's reporter Jill Treanor how he reconciled the organization's high salaries and bonuses with his religious faith, he replied: "Do I personally feel some kind of incompatibility between what I believe and being in financial services markets? I can only say no".

His appointment as group chief executive took effect on 1 June 2003. Shortly afterwards, in October 2003, HSBC announced that it would offshore the work done by its UK finance processing centres in Birmingham, Sheffield, Brentwood and Swansea to India, Malaysia and China within two years. The move, which represented the largest such offshoring in the financial services sector at that time and would lead to the loss of 4,000 British jobs, led the UK trade union UNIFI to warn Green that the "gloves were off". He defended the decision, telling The Guardian's Jill Treanor:

"If you are a responsible company like us we do need to think about this on a global basis. We have to approach this in a responsible and human way. I also have to bear in mind that people are going to get jobs in India (and elsewhere). It's wrong to pretend you can protect the existing jobs and wrong to pretend there isn't going to be change. It can't be the right response to say that emerging markets have no right to jobs." He added: "Cost minimisation cannot be the only driver of this. There is no way we want to jeopardise the quality of customer service".

Green also oversaw HSBC's acquisition of Household International, a US subprime lender, as well as its integration into the parent company. He later came to regret the deal, which was the largest acquisition in a series conducted by HSBC in the five years leading up to his appointment as its chief executive.

In January 2005, Green became chairman of HSBC Bank plc, the group's UK clearing bank subsidiary, and group executive chairman in June 2006. In its July 2005 issue, Bloomberg Markets magazine reported that HSBC was allowing money laundering by drug dealers and state sponsors of terrorism; the magazine alleged that this had included a transfer of $100,000 in April 2000 to the Taliban in Afghanistan which had subsequently resulted in a fine levied by the US Treasury Department. Green denied the allegations, calling them "a singular and wholly irresponsible attack on the bank's international compliance procedures". Subsequent investigations however, confirmed that money laundering had taken place at HSBC for several years throughout Green's tenure as chief executive and chairman, chiefly for the Sinaloa Cartel. Green earned well over £25 million per year at the time. Green's successor as the top of HSBC, Stuart Gulliver, said "between 2004 and 2010, our anti-money laundering controls should have been stronger and more effective and we failed to spot and deal with unacceptable behaviour."

=== Minister of State for Trade and Investment ===
In September 2010, it was announced that Green would join the UK's Conservative–Liberal Democrat coalition government in early 2011 as an unpaid Minister of State for Trade and Investment. In order to take up his ministerial position, he stepped down as group chairman of HSBC on 3 December 2010 and was replaced by Douglas Flint. To enable him to be accountable to Parliament, he was created a life peer on 16 November 2010 as Baron Green of Hurstpierpoint, of Hurstpierpoint in the County of West Sussex, and was introduced in the House of Lords on 22 November. He was Minister of State for Trade and Investment in both the Department for Business, Innovation and Skills and the Foreign and Commonwealth Office from 11 January 2011 until 11 December 2013.

=== Aftermath ===
After Green's retirement from HSBC, the questions that had begun to be asked about the bank's behaviour under his leadership continued. On 23 July 2012, the US Senate's Permanent Subcommittee on Investigations released a 335-page report setting out HSBC's compliance failures over a ten-year period. In the report, Senate investigators said the bank had bypassed the USA's sanctions against Iran, enabled money laundering by Mexican drug lords (chiefly for the Sinaloa Cartel), and had conducted business with companies with links to terrorism. The report quoted emails copied to Green detailing such dubious transactions and alleged that the bank had continued to allow them to continue even after he and his colleagues had promised to act. Green told Sky News that he had "no case to answer" over the money laundering scandal, saying: "As and when issues were drawn to our attention, as we were seeking to grapple with the issues, we took action. I think we must acknowledge there were some failures of implementation. HSBC has expressed its regret for that. I share that regret."

Defending Green, Lord Oakeshott, a former Treasury spokesman for the Liberal Democrats, said: "Stephen Green was a thoughtful banker in holy orders. But if even he couldn't stop these scandals, banks like HSBC and Barclays aren't just too big to fail, they are clearly too big to control".

The Senate report prompted shadow financial secretary to the Treasury, Chris Leslie, to write to Green asking him to "place on the record – at the earliest opportunity – an assurance that you took every appropriate step if and when you became aware of the issues raised by this report" and asking a number of specific questions. Leslie was unconvinced by Green's reply, in which he had written: "With regards [sic] to the bank's efforts to address its AML (anti-money laundering) and OFAC (Office of Foreign Assets Control) compliance issues, HSBC has expressed its regret that there were failures of implementation in these areas, and I share that regret". Leslie maintained that Green's letter failed to:

address the detailed questions about what he knew and when about these very serious issues. As a British Minister, an adviser to George Osborne on banking and a member of the Cabinet committee on banking reform, he is accountable first and foremost to Parliament. He cannot and should not hide behind "continuing discussions between HSBC and the US authorities" as a reason for failing to answer questions.

Shortly afterwards, Green failed to attend the House of Lords to answer a Labour question about the affair. The Leader of the House of Lords, Lord Strathclyde, defended Green, saying that his earlier employment with HSBC did not affect his ability to carry out his duties.

In February 2015, there was further criticism of Green and his leadership of HSBC after BBC Television broadcast a Panorama programme entitled The Bank of Tax Cheats exposing the complicity of HSBC's Swiss private bank, HSBC Private Banking Holdings (Suisse) SA, in helping more than 100,000 clients from over 200 countries evade tax worth hundreds of millions of pounds. At the time of the alleged offences Green was the Swiss bank's chairman. BBC presenter Richard Bilton confronted Green, who refused to discuss the issue saying only: "As a matter of principle I will not comment on the business of HSBC past or present". Chairwoman of the Public Accounts Committee, Margaret Hodge MP, said: "Either he didn't know and he was asleep at the wheel, or he did know and he was therefore involved in dodgy tax practices. Either way he was the man in charge and I think he has got really important questions to answer". A few days after the Panorama broadcast, Green resigned as chairman of the advisory council for banking industry body, The City UK, saying that he did not want to damage the effectiveness of the organisation in promoting good governance and doing the right thing.

== Other ==
Some of his prior directorships included the Bank of Bermuda Limited, HSBC Mexico, SA and the Hongkong and Shanghai Banking Corporation Limited. He was also chairman of HSBC Private Banking Holdings (Suisse) SA and HSBC North America Holdings Inc., deputy chairman of HSBC Trinkaus & Burkhardt AG and was a board member of HSBC France. In 2005 he was appointed a trustee of the British Museum, a position from which he resigned before his appointment as Minister of State. In 2014 he was appointed a trustee of the Natural History Museum by the Prime Minister David Cameron for a period of four years, and was elected chair by the board of trustees from 1 April 2014.

=== Awards ===
Green was shortlisted for the Grassroot Diplomat Initiative Award in 2015 where he remains in the directory of the Grassroot Diplomat Who's Who publication.

== Personal life ==
Green is an ordained priest in the Church of England, having studied theology at Manchester University's Northern Ordination course while in Hong Kong, and he is the author of the book Serving God? Serving Mammon? He has since described the book as "out of print and out of date". During his time as a senior banking executive, he was known to compose his sermons while travelling around the world on business.

Green was awarded an honorary doctor's degree from the School of Oriental and African Studies (SOAS), University of London in 2010.

== Publications ==
- Green, Stephen (7 May 1996). Serving God? Serving Mammon?. Marshall Pickering. ISBN 978-0551029828.
- Green, Stephen (3 June 2010). Good Value: Choosing a Better Life in Business. Penguin. ISBN 978-0141042428.
- Green, Stephen (December 2014). Reluctant Meister: How Germany's Past is Shaping its European Future. Haus Publishing. ISBN 9781908323682.
- Green, Stephen (October 2015). The European Identity: Historical and Cultural Realities We Cannot Deny. Haus Publishing. ISBN 9781910376171.
- Green, Stephen (September 2017). Dear Germany: Liebeserklärung an ein Land mit Vergangenheit. Theiss. ISBN 9783806236330.
- Green, Stephen (May 2017). Brexit and the British: Who Are We Now?. Haus Publishing. ISBN 9781910376713.

Business positions
Preceded by Keith Whitson	Group Chief Executive of HSBC Group; 2003–2006	Succeeded by Michael Geoghegan
Preceded by John Bond	Group Chairman of HSBC Group; 2006–2010	Succeeded by Douglas Flint
Orders of precedence in the United Kingdom
Preceded by The Lord Hennessy of Nympsfield	Gentlemen; Baron Green of Hurstpierpoint	Followed by The Lord Lingfield
