= Michel Prada =

French civil servant (born 1940)

Michel Prada (born 2 April 1940) is a lawyer and administrator who became a French civil servant, holding a number of senior positions.

== Background ==
Prada was born on 2 April 1940 in Bordeaux. He attended the Institut d'études politiques de Bordeaux, and then the Ecole Nationale d'Administration from 1964 to 1966. He graduated from the University of Law and Economics with a master's degree in Law.

Prada is married and has 5 children. He has been awarded the titles of Commander of the "Légion d'Honneur" and Great Officer of the "Ordre National du Mérite" and is also Chevalier of the "Ordre des Arts et Lettres". He has been Chairman of the Board of the Orchestre de Paris and of the Board of the Institut d'Etudes Politiques de Bordeaux.

== Career ==
Prada was appointed an Inspecteur des Finances, holding this position from 1966 to 1970. He was then transferred to the Ministry of the Economy in the Directorate of Public Accounting, becoming a Director of Accounting in 1978. He was appoint Budget Director in 1985. In 1987 he was promoted to Inspector General of Finance. From 1988 to 1995 he was Chairman of Crédit d'Equipement des Petites et Moyennes Entreprises (Credit Facilities for Small and Medium Businesses), a bank. He was a member of the Economic and Social Council and of the National Credit Council between 1994 and 1995.

Prada was Chairman of the French Securities Regulator from 1995 until 2002. He was Chairman of the Executive Committee of the International Organization of Securities Commissions (IOSCO) from September 1996 to September 1998, and Chairman of the Technical Committee from September 1998 to May 2000. He was again Chairman of the Technical Committee from 2006 to 2008. In November 2003 he became Chairman of the Autorité des Marchés Financiers, which regulates the stock market. Prada was a founding member of the Financial Stability Forum, the Forum of European Securities Commissions and the Committee of European Securities regulators.

In the wake of a series of corporate scandals including the collapse of Enron and WorldCom in the United States and of Parmalat in Europe, Prada led a collaborative effort by members of the international financial regulatory community to establish the Public Interest Oversight Board (PIOC) in 2005. The PIOC would oversee standards-setting activities of the International Federation of Accountants to ensure they were in compliance with the public interest. Prada was appointed a member of the Financial Crisis Advisory Group set by the International Accounting Standards Board and the US Financial Accounting Standards Board, with the mandate of considering financial reporting issues uncovered by the 2008 financial crisis.

After retiring from the Autorité des Marchés Financiers in December 2008, Prada became chair of the Conseil de Normalisation des Comptes Publics (Public Sector Accounting Standard Council) at the Budget Ministry of France. He was also appointed chairman of the Board of Trustees of the International Valuation Standards Council a post he held until December 2011 when he was appointed as chairman of the International Financial Reporting Standards Foundation. He is a board member of the International Centre for Financial Regulation (ICFR) and co-chair of the Council on Global Financial Regulation.

== Bibliography ==
- Michel Prada, René Barberye (1988). La comptabilité publique: L'Administration nouvelle. Berger-Levrault. ISBN 2-7013-0886-0.
- Michel Prada (1989). Le Financement du développement des PME La France, l'Europe. Xeme [dixième] Plan 1989 - 1992. Documentation Française. ISBN 2-11-002253-1.
- Michel Prada, Jean-Claude Mothie (2006). Guide de l'actionnaire salarié de l'épargne salariale et de l'épargne retraite. Ed. Constellation Multimédia. ISBN 2-9525807-0-7.
