= Edward Braham =

British lawyer (born 1961)

Sir Edward Braham

Personal details
- Born: Edward Charles Braham; 17 July 1961 (age 65) London, United Kingdom
- Spouse: Isabel Gurney (m. 1988)
- Children: 3
- Education: Oxford University
- Occupation: Corporate lawyer
- Awards: Knight Bachelor

Sir Edward Braham (born 17 July 1961) is a British corporate lawyer, who serves as chairman of M&G since 2022.

== Biography ==
The son of David Braham QC and Louise née Treves, he was educated at Eton College before studying law at Worcester College, Oxford (BA) then as Vinerian Scholar for postgraduate studies (BCL).

Articled with Freshfields in 1985 and admitted as a solicitor in 1987, Braham was a partner of Freshfields Bruckhaus Deringer from 1995 until 2022, serving as global corporate practice group leader (2009–14), then senior partner (2016–21).

Braham was chairman of the Mutual Market Access Working Group during negotiation of the EU–UK Trade and Cooperation Agreement, served on the Professional and Business Services Council (2017–20), and was appointed a member of the Prime Minister's Financial and Professional Business Services Council in 2019, and since 2022 as a non-exec board member of HM Treasury.

A member of the advisory board of the Lord Mayor's Appeal from 2016 until 2021 and currently chair of trustees at the Lord Mayor's Appeal, a liveryman of the Solicitors’ Company since 2011, and third warden of the Goldsmiths' Company for 2024/25, Sir Edward is a director of TheCityUK, and was knighted for "services to corporate law and to business" in the 2025 New Year Honours.
