= Gerard Kleisterlee =

Dutch businessman and engineer (born 1946)

- Born: 28 September 1946 (age 80); Ludwigsburg, Germany
- Education: Eindhoven University of Technology; University of Pennsylvania
- Known for: former CEO, Philips
- Children: 3

Gerard Johannes Kleisterlee (born 28 September 1946) is a Dutch businessman and engineer. He is the chairman of Vodafone, former supervisory board chairman of ASML Holding, and the former president and CEO of Philips.

== Early life ==
Born in Ludwigsburg, Germany, on 28 September 1946 to Dutch and German parents, he was raised in the Netherlands. He was educated at a Jesuit-run Canisius College in Nijmegen, followed by the Eindhoven University of Technology, where he earned a MSc degree in electronic engineering. He received an MBA from the University of Pennsylvania's Wharton Business School in 1991. He attended the program for executive development at the Swiss business school International Institute for Management Development (IMD) in Lausanne.

== Career ==
Trained as an electronics engineer, like his father, he worked at Philips for almost all of his life. From 1981 to 1986 he was general manager of Philips' Professional Audio Product Group. Kleisterlee joined Philips Components in 1986. After becoming general manager of Philips Display Components for Europe. He was appointed managing director of Philips Display Components Worldwide in 1994. He became president of Philips Taiwan and Regional Manager for Philips Components in Asia-Pacific in 1996. From September 1997 through June 1998 he was also responsible for all the activities of the Philips Group in China. He served on the Hong Kong Chief Executive's Council of International Advisers from 1998 to 2005.

In May 2001 Kleisterlee succeeded Cor Boonstra as CEO of Philips. In 2006, he spun off the volatile semiconductors business into a separate entity NXP Semiconductors, and then sold a controlling 80.1% stake to a consortium of private equity investors. His tenure as CEO has been credited with turning the company around and returning Philips to its original focus areas.

He was succeeded by Frans van Houten as CEO of Philips in April 2011. A director of Dell, Kleisterlee was nominated as the successor at Vodafone to chairman John Bond in January 2011, a position he assumed in July 2011. He was awarded an Honorary doctorate from the Catholic University of Leuven in 2005. He was named 2006 Europe Businessman of the Year by Fortune.

== Personal life ==
He is married, with three children.
