= Fusion IP =

Defunct UK intellectual property company

Fusion IP plc
- Company type: Public (LSE: FIP)
- Industry: Business Incubation; Venture Capital; Seed Funding; Early Stage Investment; Intellectual Property Commercialisation
- Founded: Sheffield, South Yorkshire (2001)
- Headquarters: Sheffield, United Kingdom
- Key people: Doug Liversidge CBE (Chairman); David Baynes (CEO)
- Website: www.fusionip.co.uk

Fusion IP plc was a UK-based listed company that capitalised on intellectual property extracted from four UK-based universities, three of which were part of the Russell Group of universities:

- University of Sheffield,
- Cardiff University,
- University of Nottingham,
- Swansea University.

It did this by creating companies around commercially opportunistic research and discoveries from the four universities. These companies were grown to eventually be sold (see spin-out companies).

Fusion IP was acquired by IP Group plc on 20 March 2014.

Fusion IP was one of a handful of companies that specialised in the commercialisation of university intellectual property within the UK through the sourcing of funding from public markets. The other two notable companies operating in the same field were IP Group plc (LSE: IPO) and Imperial Innovations plc (LSE: IVO). Additionally, smaller companies operated within the field of university intellectual property but did not have such a focus on spinning out companies, nor a formal contractual relationship with universities over intellectual property rights.

== Incubation Model ==
Fusion IP's model of growing companies focused around a business incubation model in which Fusion IP employees initially ran, then continued to support the growth of every company within its portfolio.

Stages to the Fusion IP company creation and growth model:

1. Review commercial opportunities produced by university partners, selecting those with the most potential for further development - "mining for ideas"
2. Convert the idea into a small start-up company - incubation stage
3. Grow the company using a traditional venture capital approach
4. Sell the company

== Partnerships ==
=== University Partnerships ===
Fusion IP had current intellectual property agreements with four UK universities, three of which are part of the Russell Group of Universities. Fusion IP intends to further increase the number of university agreements it holds in the future.

==== University of Sheffield ====
In 2005, Fusion IP signed a 10-year agreement with the University of Sheffield for the exclusive rights to commercialise all of their university-owned medical intellectual property, through either licensing or the creation of spin-out companies.
In July 2008, Fusion IP signed a new expanded agreement with the University of Sheffield to add all university-owned intellectual property from physical sciences to the original agreement, such that Fusion had the rights over all of the University of Sheffield's intellectual property, through either licensing or the creation of spin-out companies. This new expanded agreement gives Fusion IP the exclusive rights to all physical sciences intellectual property until 2018, in addition to the exclusive medical intellectual property rights, which currently runs to 2015.

==== Cardiff University ====
In 2007, Fusion IP signed a second exclusive 10-year agreement with Cardiff University to commercialise all of their intellectual property. This agreement was almost identical to that which the company entered into with Sheffield. This differed only through a limitation which requires Fusion IP to create a company around intellectual property in order to commercialise it.

==== University of Nottingham ====
Fusion IP partnered with the University of Nottingham in 2013. This was announced as part of a new £20m funding round. The agreement is less formal than the company's first two agreements, and in effect gives Fusion first “look-see” rights to IP generated at the university.

The agreement with the university was referred to as an MOU (memorandum of understanding).

==== Swansea University ====
Fusion IP partnered with Swansea University in 2013, at the same time as it entered an agreement with the University of Nottingham. The agreements for each university are identical.

=== Financing Partnerships ===
==== Finance Wales ====
The Finance Wales Group managed funds of more than £335 million and had invested more than £189 million. It entered a memorandum of understanding with Fusion IP during 2007 and renewed this agreement in 2013, at which time Swansea University was added to the terms of reference.

Finance Wales had co invested with Fusion IP in a number of companies including Diurnal, Medaphor, Q-Chip, Mesuro and Asalus.

==== IP Group ====
IP Group plc is a UK intellectual property commercialisation company. IP Group provided more than traditional venture capital, providing its companies with access to business building expertise, networks, recruitment and business support.

== Companies within the Fusion IP Portfolio (A-Z) ==
(As of 1 September 2013)

Company	Brief Description of Company Function	Year Company Founded	Fusion Shareholding	Current/Exit
Absynth Biologics	Vaccines and antibodies to treat Staphylococcus aureus	2007	52%	Current
Adjuvantix	Prophylactic and therapeutic vaccines	2003	42.6%	Current
Art of Xen	New anaesthetic drugs	2002	31.6%	Current
Asalus Medical Instruments	Medical device for surgical procedures	2009	44%	Current
Asterion	Therapeutic treatments for diseases	2003	38%	Current
Bitecic		2006	10%	Current
Diurnal	Pharmaceutical solutions to drug releases within the body	2004	41.8%	Current
Fault Current Ltd	Commercial electricity products	2012		Current
I2L Research	Research company	1994	31%	Current
iterate	Manufacturer testing equipment	2010	40%	Current
Magnomatics	Magnetic gearboxes and motors	2006	31.5%	Current
Medaphor	Ultrasound training devices	2004	39%	Current
Medella Therapeutics	Monoclonal antibodies to inhibit the action of Adrenomedullin (ADM)	2007	60%	Current
Mesuro	Design software	2008	46.5%	Current
Nanotether Discovery Science	Manipulation of molecules	2012	21.5%	Current
Perlemax	Bubble generators for commercial application	2011	35%	Current
Phase Focus	Microscopy	2006	34%	Current
proFlu	Pharmaceutical product	2012		Current
Progenteq	Novel cartilage replacement therapy	2010	48%	Current
Q-Chip	Pharmaceuticals	2003	1.5%	Current
Seren Photonics	LED production	2010	40.2%	Current
simCYP	Drug modelling software	2001	24.9% (sold for £32m)	Exit
zilico	Cervical cancer diagnostics	2006	3.6%	Current
