= Michael Sandberg, Baron Sandberg =

The Right Honourable The Lord Sandberg CBE

Unofficial Member of the Executive Council of Hong Kong
- In office September 1, 1979 – August 31, 1986
- Appointed by: Murray MacLehose; Edward Youde

Member of the House of Lords
- Lord Temporal
- Life peerage 2 October 1997 – 8 May 2015

Personal details
- Born: 31 May 1927 Surrey, England
- Died: 2 July 2017 (aged 90)
- Spouse(s): Carmel, Lady Sandberg
- Children: Deirdre Sandberg; Paul Sandberg; Michael Kevin Sandberg; Marion Sandberg
- Parent(s): Gerald Arthur Clifford Sandberg (1882–1954); Ethel Marian Ruddock (1882–1947)
- Education: St Edward's School, Oxford

Michael Graham Ruddock Sandberg, Baron Sandberg, CBE (Chinese: 沈弼, 31 May 1927 – 2 July 2017) was executive chairman of The Hongkong and Shanghai Banking Corporation from 1977 to 1986.

== Biography ==
Sandberg was born in Surrey and educated at St Edward's School, Oxford. In 1945 he joined the army and was commissioned 2nd lieutenant in the Royal Armoured Corps in 1946, and was promoted to lieutenant in November 1947. He later volunteered to join the Indian Army. Upon Indian independence he joined the First King's Dragoon Guards in January 1949.

In 1949 he joined The Hongkong and Shanghai Banking Corporation, becoming chairman and chief executive in 1977. During his chairmanship the bank saw substantial international expansion, acquiring a 51% stake in Marine Midland Bank in the United States of America, establishing the Hongkong Bank of Canada in 1981 and Hongkong Bank of Australia Limited in 1986. As Chairman Sandberg was responsible for the construction of the landmark HSBC Main Building in Central, Hong Kong, which at the time was the most expensive building ever constructed in the world. Having been appointed an Officer of the Order of the British Empire (OBE) in 1977 and promoted to a Commander (CBE) in the 1982 Birthday Honours, on retirement he received a knighthood for "public services in Hong Kong". On 2 October 1997 he was created a life peer in the House of Lords as Baron Sandberg of Passfield in the County of Hampshire. He retired from the House on 8 May 2015. He died on 2 July 2017 at the age of 90.

Coat of arms of Michael Sandberg, Baron Sandberg

Crest
A pearl Proper between two wings displayed Argent.
Escutcheon
Argent on a chevron Or fimbriated Vert a robin redbreast (Erithacus rubecula) Proper all between three trefoils slipped Vert.
Supporters
Dexter, a Chinese dragon Or; Sinister, a dragon sans wings Or.
Motto
Serva Fidem

Business positions
Preceded by Guy Sayer	Chairman of The Hongkong and Shanghai Banking Corporation; 1977–1986	Succeeded by Sir William Purves
Sporting positions
Preceded by P. G. Williams	Chairman of the Royal Hong Kong Jockey Club; 1981–1986	Succeeded by Sir Oswald Cheung
