= Barbara Ridpath =

Barbara Ridpath is director of St Paul's Institute, a department of St Paul's Cathedral that focuses on the relationship between finance, economics and the common good. Ridpath is married to the writer, Michael Ridpath.

== Education ==
Ridpath gained an AB degree at Smith College before going on to receive a master's degree in international affairs at Columbia University.

== Business career ==
Prior to her position at St Paul's Institute, Ridpath was chief executive of the International Centre for Financial Regulation. Previous to her work at the ICFR, she was executive managing director and head of ratings services, Europe, for Standard & Poor's, from 2004 to 2008, where she was responsible for Standard & Poor's rating activities in Europe, the Middle East and Africa. Before that she was managing director and chief credit officer, Europel based in Standard & Poor's London office, where she was responsible for the development and application of ratings policy in Europe including its global consistency.

Ridpath joined S&P in 1983 after three years as an economist at the Federal Reserve Bank of New York. She worked in S&P's European network from 1986, holding a broad range of positions. Ridpath spearheaded S&P's move into international securitisation whilst based in London in the late 1980s, and ran S&P-ADEF in Paris from 1990 to 1993. From 1993 to 1998 Ridpath was a senior credit officer at JPMorgan Europe, rejoining S&P in 1998.

She is currently also a non-executive director of the National Australia Group Europe, and a member of Council of Chatham House, the Royal Institute of International Affairs.
