= Certificate in Mortgage Advice and Practice =

The Certificate in Mortgage Advice and Practice (CeMAP) is a UK-specific qualification for mortgage advisers offered by The London Institute of Banking & Finance at QCF Level 3. It meets the standards required by the Financial Conduct Authority to practice as a 'licensed' adviser in the UK. As of 2020 80% of UK advisers hold this qualification.

== Qualification process ==
The qualification comprises seven mandatory units that are studied and assessed in three modules as follows:

=== Module 1 ===
- Unit 1 - Introduction to Financial Services Environments and Products
- Unit 2 - UK Financial Services and Regulation

CeMAP Module 1 Exam:

The CeMAP Module 1 exam consists of 100 multiple choice questions in total. The first 50 questions are based on Unit 1 and the remaining 50 questions are based on Unit 2. Students must achieve a score of 70% or more to pass this unit. The test is currently conducted at the Pearson VUE test centres in the United Kingdom.

=== Module 2 ===
- Unit 3 - Mortgage Law, Policy and Markets
- Unit 4 - Mortgage Applications
- Unit 5 - Mortgage Payment Methods and Products
- Unit 6 - Mortgage Arrears and Post Completion

CeMAP Module 2 Exam:

The CeMAP Module 2 exam consists of 100 multiple choice questions in total that are divided into categories. 25 questions will be based on Unit 3, 25 questions for unit 4, 25 questions for unit 5 and 25 questions for unit 6. Students must achieve a score of 68% or more in each category to pass this exam. The test is currently conducted at the Pearson VUE test centres in the United Kingdom.

=== Module 3 ===
- Unit 7 - Assessment of Mortgage Advice and Knowledge

CeMAP 3 Exam:

The CeMAP Module 3 exam consists of 60 multiple choice questions in total. The student will be presented with 6 scenarios and will be asked 10 questions for each scenario. Students must achieve a score of 70% or more to pass this unit. The test is currently conducted at the Pearson VUE test centres in the United Kingdom.

== Higher level qualifications ==
The London Institute of Banking & Finance offers CeMAP holders a higher level CeMAP Diploma and existing mortgage advisers certificates in Regulated Equity Release (CeRER).
