= William Purves (banker) =

Scottish banker

The Honourable Sir William Purves CBE, DSO

Chairman of HSBC Holdings
- In office 1990–1998

CEO of HSBC Holdings
- In office 1990–1992

Chairman of The Hongkong and Shanghai Banking Corporation
- In office 1987–1992

CEO of The Hongkong and Shanghai Banking Corporation
- In office 1986–1992

Personal details
- Born: 27 December 1931 (age 94) Kelso, Scottish Borders, Scotland
- Spouses: Diana Troutbeck Richardson (m. 1958–1988) Rebecca Jane Lewellen (m. 1989)
- Civilian awards: Commander of the Order of the British Empire; Grand Bauhinia Medal (Hong Kong)

Military service
- Allegiance: United Kingdom
- Branch/service: British Army
- Battles/wars: Korean War
- Military awards: Distinguished Service Order

Sir William "Willie" Purves, CBE, DSO (Chinese: 浦偉士, born 27 December 1931) was a Scottish banker until his retirement in 1998. He was the first Group Chairman of HSBC Holdings following the creation of a holding company to act as parent to The Hongkong and Shanghai Banking Corporation and the Midland Bank following the former's acquisition of Midland in 1992.

== Biography ==
Born in Kelso, Scotland, Purves attended Kelso High School before commencing training with The National Bank of Scotland (later merged into The Royal Bank of Scotland) in 1948. This was interrupted by National Service in Korea, during which time he was awarded the Distinguished Service Order (DSO) – the only National Service officer to have won this honour.

He rejoined banking in 1954 and moved to Hong Kong to join The Hongkong and Shanghai Banking Corporation (HSBC), where he remained for the rest of his working life. In 1986, he became chairman and CEO of The Hongkong and Shanghai Banking Corporation, and was appointed Chairman in 1991 prior to the formation of HSBC Holdings, and as such oversaw the purchase and integration of Midland Bank.

Purves was an opponent of the 1994 Hong Kong electoral reform, believing it had come too late before the handover of Hong Kong scheduled for 1997. The Governor of Hong Kong, Chris Patten, promoter of the reforms, responded to Purves saying: "He is presumably a good bank manager". During the vote on the legislation, he phoned HSBC employee and legislator Vincent Cheng from Shanghai, asking him to vote in favour of a wrecking amendment to the reforms but the amendment failed by one vote. The reforms eventually passed. He retired in 1998.

Purved was knighted in 1993 and awarded the Grand Bauhinia Medal by Hong Kong in 1999, he now lives in London and Oxfordshire. He is married to Lady Purves, and has four children and nine grandchildren by his first wife, Diana Purves.

== See also ==
- Sir Willie Purves Quaich, an annual rugby union award

Business positions
| Preceded by Michael Sandberg | Chief Executive of HSBC Holdings; 1985–1993 | Succeeded by John Bond |
| Preceded by Michael Sandberg | Group Chairman of HSBC Holdings; 1987–1999 | Succeeded by John Bond |
Sporting positions
| Preceded by Sir Gordon Macwhinnie | Chairman of the Royal Hong Kong Jockey Club; 1992–1993 | Succeeded by Sir John Joseph Swaine |
Order of precedence
| Preceded by Anson Chan; Recipient of the Grand Bauhinia Medal | Hong Kong order of precedence Recipient of the Grand Bauhinia Medal | Succeeded by Henry Litton; Recipient of the Grand Bauhinia Medal |
