= Good Value =

2009 book by Stephen Green

Good Value: Reflections on Money, Morality and an Uncertain World
- Author: Stephen Green
- Language: English
- Publisher: Penguin Books
- Publication date: 2 July 2009
- Media type: Print, e-book
- Pages: 216
- ISBN: 978-0141042428
- OCLC: 966051980

Good Value: Reflections on money, morality and an uncertain world is a 2009 book by Stephen Green, the Chairman of HSBC, written in response to the banking crisis.

He describes the book as "a journey of unfinished exploration" and suggests that deep personal and corporate values are essential for a sustainable revival of business. He suggests that "We need to be able to look ourselves in the mirror and ask two questions about our role in the global bazaar: how is what I am doing contributing to human welfare? And why am I specifically doing it?"

== Reviews and comments ==
- Chris Blackhurst in the Evening Standard described it as "an intensely intimate, refreshing and at times searing read" and said it "should be required reading in business schools and boardrooms"
- Ruth Gledhill in The Times says "is a detailed analysis of the ethical and moral issues arising from the present economic crisis. It is not remotely didactic and it is mercifully free from the self-righteous pomposity that you might expect from a banker who is also an ordained clergyman."
- Lionel Barber in the Financial Times says the book "wrestles with the demands of individual responsibility and the market but it is set in a broader economic and historical context. Green’s ambition is to make the case for globalisation as an inevitable, progressive force and as a human phenomenon."
- Boyd Tonkin in The Independent raises two cheers for a book that "strides fluently between T.S. Eliot and Karl Marx, Goethe and Camus, Adam Smith and the Prophet Isaiah, Amartya Sen and Teilhard de Chardin, Puccini's operas in Beijing and Rajasthani paintings at the British Museum"
- The Wall Street Journal described the book as "an unusual and thoughtful disquisition on how to conduct oneself in a world of high finance and ambition, in ...the global bazaar."
