= Warren Lichtenstein =

American businessman (born 1965)

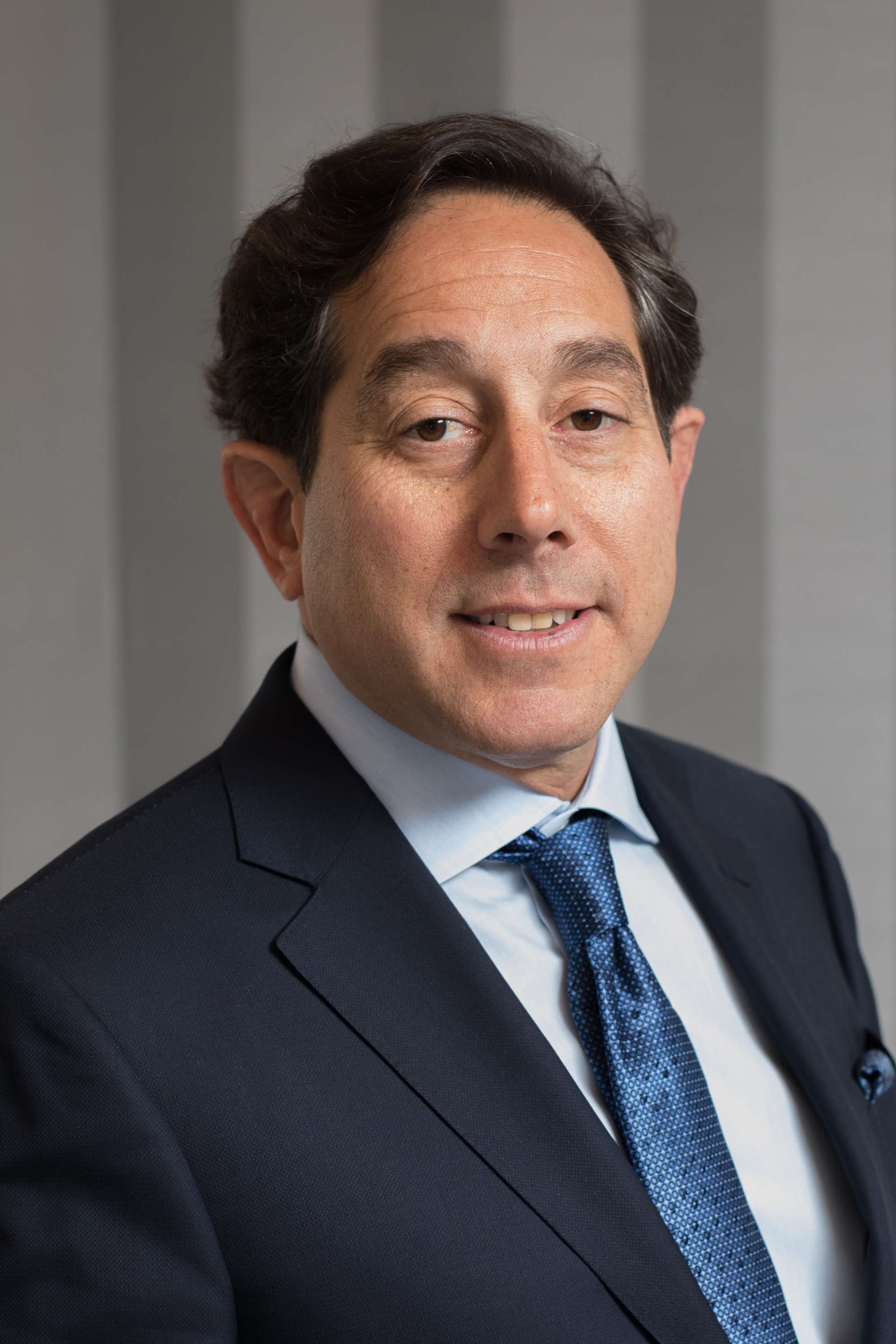
Warren G. Lichtenstein

Warren G. Lichtenstein (born 1965) is an American businessman and philanthropist. Lichtenstein is founder and executive chairman of Steel Partners Holdings L.P. (NYSE:SPLP), a global diversified holding company. He founded the company in 1990 at the age of 24 after beginning his career as an analyst at Para Partners, L.P. and then serving as an acquisition analyst at Ballantrae Partners, L.P. Over the past 25 years Steel Partners has grown from a private investment fund, with two employees and assets of $600,000, into Steel Partners Holdings L.P., a company with the companies it has invested in having a combined revenue of more than $3.6 billion employs 13,500 people in 155 plants and facilities in 20 countries. A claim no different than most fractional investors might assert of the sum revenues, employees and operations of the entities within a portfolio.

== Education ==
Lichtenstein graduated from the University of Pennsylvania with a Bachelor's degree in economics. Before that, he attended Tulane University.

== Career ==
Lichtenstein is chairman of Steel Partners LLC, based in New York City. Lichtenstein is a former chairman of Aerojet Rocketdyne Holdings, Inc., an American rocket and missile propulsion manufacturer. His tenure as Aerojet Chairman ended on June 30, 2022 by overwhelming share holder sentiment, a result of a proxy contest in which the then CEO, Eileen Drake, led a successful proxy campaign that removed Lichtenstein and all of the Steel Partners selected board members.

Lichtenstein also serves as chairman of Steel Sports, Inc., a subsidiary company of Steel Partners, founded in 2011, focused on transforming and improving the youth sports experience in America. Lichtenstein also provided the initial seed funding for both the Positive Coaching Alliance (PCA) Los Angeles Chapter (which launched in June 2015) and the PCA-New York City Chapter (which launched January 2016).

== Philanthropy ==
Lichtenstein founded a charitable organization called Steel Partners Foundation that was a significant donor to the building of the Chabad Jewish Community Center Aspen Valley Aspen, Colorado. Steel Partners Foundation provided funding to the Aspen Art Museum, for its new building that opened in 2014. The building was designed by the Japanese architect Shigeru Ban, winner of the 2014 Pritzker Prize. Steel Partners Foundation also participated in the campaign to rebuild Tulane University after it was hit by Hurricane Katrina and 70% of the main campus was flooded and donated challenge funding to the University of Pennsylvania School of Arts and Sciences to help establish 19 new student scholarships.

== Personal life ==
Lichtenstein has two children: a son by his first marriage and a daughter with Annabelle Bond. He was ordered to pay back child support in the largest child support case in Hong Kong history. Lichtenstein applied to the courts for more time with his daughter and in 2016 hosted a Think Tank on Parental Alienation with actor Jason Patric and professor and psychiatrist William Bernet, an editor of “Parental Alienation”.
