= Douglas Flint =

British banker and business executive (born 1955)

Sir Douglas Flint CBE
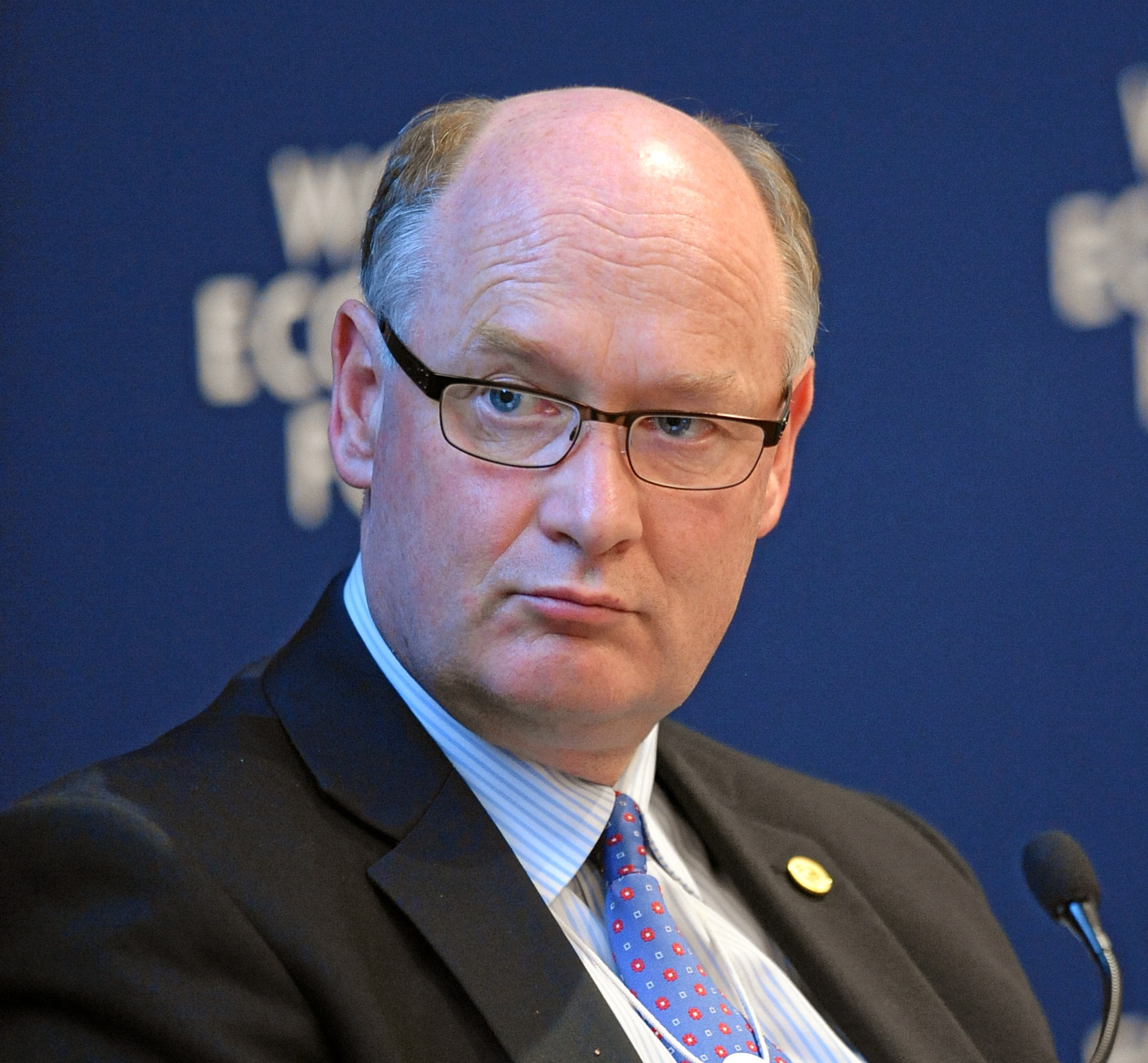
- Flint in 2012
- Born: 8 July 1955 (age 71); Glasgow, Scotland, UK
- Education: University of Glasgow
- Occupations: Chairman of Aberdeen and IP Group; Chartered Accountant

Sir Douglas Jardine Flint, CBE (born 8 July 1955) is a British banker and business executive. He was the chairman of HSBC Holdings from 2011 to 2017, having previously been finance director since 1995. He is chairman of Aberdeen, IP Group, and is chairing Prudential from 28 May 2026.

== Education ==
Flint graduated with a bachelor's degree with honours in Accounting from the University of Glasgow. He also completed the PMD course at Harvard Business School in 1983. Flint is a member of a number of professional bodies such as the Institute of Chartered Accountants of Scotland, the British Association of Corporate Treasurers professional body and most recently, Institute of International Finance, where he now serves as chairman of the board. He is also a Fellow of the Chartered Institute of Management Accountants.

== Career ==
Flint started his career in Peat Marwick Mitchell & Co. (now KPMG), and was appointed a partner of the firm in 1988. He became Group Finance Director of HSBC in 1995. He was the Chairman of the Financial Reporting Council's review of the Turnbull Guidance on Internal Control from 2004 to 2005 and was a member of The Accounting Standards Board and the Standards Advisory Council of the International Accounting Standards Committee Foundation from 2001 to 2004.

In June 2006, in recognition to his services to the finance industry, he was appointed a Commander of the Order of the British Empire (CBE).

Flint became group chairman of HSBC at the end of 2010. In 2014, he criticised banking regulations as "disproportionate", "unwarranted risk aversion [which] threatens to restrict access to the formal financial system to many who could benefit from it".

He became chairman of IP Group in November 2018. In October 2018 it was announced that he would become the new chairman of Standard Life Aberdeen on 1 January 2019, succeeding Sir Gerry Grimstone.

In 2023, Flint was included in a ten-member panel to advise opposition leader Keir Starmer.

In January 2026, Flint was announced as the next board chair of Prudential and will assume the role from 28 May from Shriti Vadera, Baroness Vadera.

Business positions
Preceded by Lord Green of Hurstpierpoint	Group Chairman of HSBC; 2011–2017	Succeeded by Mark Tucker
