= Ed Bussey =

British entrepreneur

Ed Bussey is a technology entrepreneur who has been named in the 2015 and 2016 Sunday Times list of Debretts’ 500 most influential people in Britain. He is currently CEO of Oxford Science Enterprises, which has a portfolio of more than 125 companies spun out of Oxford University, with a combined value of £1.1 billion.

== Career ==
=== Oxford Science Enterprises ===
Bussey was appointed CEO of Oxford Science Enterprises in September 2023. During his tenure, he has actively lobbied the government to strengthen the UK's position as a global leader in innovation, by accelerating government procurement timelines, attracting increased foreign investment, and fast-tracking the world's top specialist talent into the UK.

=== Quill ===
In 2011, Bussey launched Quill, offering multi-language content production for ecommerce. Quill was ranked by Deloitte in the 2016 Fast 50 rankings for the UK's fastest growing tech businesses and as part of its 2017 Technology Fast 500 EMEA rankings. In 2018, Quill was awarded Best Agency at the eCommerce Awards.

In May 2019, Quill Content was acquired by French media group, Webedia. In 2021, Quill merged with digital transformation agency Jellyfish, to become its global Performance Content capability (renamed Ecommerce Content in September 2021). Bussey became Chief Solutions Officer at Jellyfish.

=== ZYB ===
In 2007, Bussey become Chief Operating Officer at ZYB, with responsibilities for marketing, business development and operations. ZYB was a mobile social networking business with backing from Nordic Venture Partners. In 2007 Business Week called their service one of the ten most innovative mobile products of the year. It was later acquired by Vodafone Plc in May 2008.

=== figleaves.com ===
In 2000, Bussey was a founder and Global Marketing Director of figleaves.com. figleaves.com launched into the UK and US by 2005. with over a million customers in 66 countries. In 2004, figleaves.com was named “UK Internet Retailer of the Year”. In 2010 the company was bought by N Brown Plc.

=== Military ===
Bussey began his career in the Royal Navy, where he was awarded his officer commission. Following this, he held various security and counter-terrorism appointments around the world with the UK diplomatic service.

== Expeditions ==
At 21, Bussey was elected a Fellow of the Royal Geographical Society, for his mountaineering expeditions and extreme endurance event participation. He has taken part in expeditions or events in places like Bhutan, the Indian Himalayas, Alaska, Costa Rica, and southern Africa. In 2010 he completed an unsupported trek to the North Pole to raise money for the Global Angels charity

== Honours & Awards ==
Bussey earned a degree in Natural Science (Psychology) from Cambridge University where he was President of the Young Entrepreneurs Society, and regional winner of the UK Young Entrepreneur of the Year competition. He started his first business in university, which he sold even before he graduated.

In 2015, Bussey was named ‘Entrepreneur of the Year’ at the annual Great British Entrepreneur Awards. He was included in the 2015 and 2016 Sunday Times list of Debretts’ 500 most influential people in Britain.

In 2018 Bussey was named Disruptor of the Year at the UK Tech Founder Awards and runner-up in the Scale-up category at the Great British Entrepreneur Awards.

Bussey was awarded with 'Entrepreneurial Success of the Year’ at the Heropreneurs Awards in 2019, recognising his achievements since leaving the military in 2000.

In 2021 Quill (now Jellyfish) Bussey was awarded Fashion Content Campaign of the Year at the UK Content Awards.

Bussey is part of the London Stock Exchange ELITE programme and an active participant in the Tech London Advocates community.
