= Michael Ridpath =

British writer

- Born: 1961 (age 64–65); Devon
- Education: Merton College, Oxford
- Occupation: novelist
- Spouse: Barbara Ridpath
- Writing career
- Period: 1995 onwards
- Genres: Financial thrillers, crime novels
- Notable works: Fire and Ice series
- Website: www.michaelridpath.com

Michael Ridpath is an English author of thrillers involving the world of high finance, as well as his Fire and Ice crime series set in Iceland, standalone novels and historical fiction. He was born in Devon in 1961 and grew up in Yorkshire. He was educated at Millfield School and Merton College, Oxford, and spent eight years working as a bond trader at an international bank in the City of London. His past employers include Saudi International Bank and Apax Partners.

Ridpath lives in north London with three children and his wife, Barbara Ridpath. His latest work is the Fire & Ice series about an Icelandic detective called Magnus Jonson.

== Bibliography ==
=== Financial thrillers ===
- Free to Trade (1995)
- Trading Reality (1996)
- The Marketmaker (1998)
- Final Venture (2000)
- The Predator (2001)
- Fatal Error (2003)

==== Alex Calder ====
- On The Edge (2005)
- See No Evil (2006)

=== Magnus Iceland Mysteries (Fire and Ice) ===
- Where The Shadows Lie (Corvus, June 2010)
- 66° North (Corvus, May 2011)
- Edge of Nowhere (Corvus, December 2011)
- Meltwater (June 2012)
- Sea of Stone (May 2014)
- The Polar Bear Killing (2015)
- The Super Recogniser of Vik (2016)
- The Wanderer (September 2018)
- Death in Dalvik (2022)
- Whale Fjord (2024)

=== Conrad de Lancey – pre-WWII & WWII spy novels ===
- Traitor's Gate (Head of Zeus, June 2013)
- Shadows of War (Head of Zeus, January 2015)

=== Stand-alone novels ===
- Amnesia (Corvus, May 2017)
- Launch Code (Corvus, 2019)
- The Diplomat's Wife (Corvus, 2021)

=== Short stories ===
- "Partnership Track" (2005), published in The Detection Collection, edited by Simon Brett.
