= Additional notification thresholds =

In some countries, financial regulatory regimes allows issuers to set additional issuer specific notification thresholds in their articles of association.

== Overview ==
Major shareholding disclosure regimes defines disclosure thresholds. In case an investor crosses those defined thresholds he is required to disclose those shareholdings. The disclosure needs to be made public by notification to the competent financial authority as well as to the issuer. The setup of the disclosure regimes differs in each country. As a matter of fact the thresholds requiring a disclosure varies in each country. But still those regulatory thresholds applies to shareholdings in all issuers required to be disclosed in this country.

Nevertheless, in some countries there are additional issuer specific notification thresholds. Those additional thresholds are in addition to the ones set out by major shareholding notification regimes. E.g. in Austria, Belgium, France and Italy issuers are allowed to stipulate additional notification thresholds in their articles of association according to the European Securities and Markets Authority [ESMA]. For example, following issuers have additional notification thresholds set in their articles of association: Accor S.A. 0,5% and multiple, 2Valorise 3%, AB Science 2% and multiple, l'Oreal S.A. 1% and multiple up to 5%, Acheter-Louer 3% and multiple and Total S.A. 1% and multiple.

== Lowest additional notification threshold in Belgium ==
Issuers having shares admitted to trading on a regulated market, for which Belgium is the home member state can stipulate additional notification thresholds, on the basis of article 18 of the law of 2 May 2007. The law came effective by the royal decree of 14 February 2008 on disclosure of major shareholdings. The initial threshold for the notification of major shareholdings in Belgium is 5%. Whereas the lowest possible additional notification threshold is 1%.

The Belgium financial authority provides on unofficial list of issuers which set additional notification thresholds in their articles of association. It is also stated that the issuer bears sole responsibility for the accuracy of the information given.

== Lowest additional notification threshold in France ==
Shareholders are required to notify when their shareholding exceeds or falls below certain thresholds. According to the act of 26 July 2005 the lowest disclosure threshold is 1/20 which represents 5% (article l. 233-7 of the commercial code).

Pursuant the same article allows that companies can require additional notification obligations in their articles of association. The lowest possible additional notification threshold may not be less than 0.5%.

== See also ==
- Financial Services and Markets Authority
- Autorité des marchés financiers (France)
