= John Bond (banker) =

British banker and corporate director

Sir John Bond

Chairman of Xstrata
- Incumbent
- Assumed office February 2011
- Preceded by: Lord MacLaurin of Knebworth

Group Chairman of HSBC Holdings
- In office 29 May 1998 – 26 May 2006
- Preceded by: Sir William Purves
- Succeeded by: Lord Green of Hurstpierpoint

Group Chief Executive of HSBC Holdings
- In office 1 January 1993 – 29 May 1998
- Preceded by: Sir William Purves
- Succeeded by: Keith Whitson

Personal details
- Born: 24 July 1941 (age 85) Oxford, England, United Kingdom
- Spouse: Elizabeth Bond

Sir John Reginald Hartnell Bond (born 24 July 1941) is the chairman of Swiss mining company Xstrata. He previously served as chairman of HSBC Holdings plc, spending a total of 45 years with the bank.

He was appointed as a member of the Hong Kong Chief Executive's Council of International Advisers in the years of 1998–2005.

== Early life ==
Born in Oxford, Bond was educated at Tonbridge School. His family's roots are in Bristol. Bond failed to gain admittance to Oxford University, and on leaving Tonbridge he spent his gap year in the US, as an English-Speaking Union scholarship student at Cate School, in Carpinteria, California, before gaining a passage on a ship from Long Beach to Hong Kong as a deck hand.

== Career ==
Bond joined the Hongkong and Shanghai Banking Corporation as a trainee international manager in 1961, at the age of 19. An earlier application was turned down, before the intervention of the father of an old school friend who was a broker for the bank. He spent his early career in Hong Kong, Indonesia, Singapore and Thailand, before returning to Hong Kong to manage the bank's investment banking arm Wardley in the 1980s. From there, he was posted to New York City, to head the bank's United States operations (which included Marine Midland Bank), before being appointed HSBC Group CEO in 1993. Bond took over as Group Chairman in 1998 with the retirement of Sir William Purves.

During Bond's tenure as chairman, HSBC extended its reach well beyond its major franchises in Hong Kong and Britain. From 1998 to 2005, HSBC spent $47bn on acquisitions, including those of Republic National Bank, Credit Commercial de France, Bital Bank, Bank of Bermuda, Mid-Med Bank Malta plc., and Household International.

He was chairman when the Household acquisition was approved in 2003 by the Board. Household was a consumer finance business, an established business in the US serving the 40% of the US population who are sub-prime; other major players were GE, Wells Fargo, Citigroup and AIG.

During his Chairmanship HSBC invested over $3 billion in China by buying 20% stakes in Bank of Communications and Ping An Insurance, as well as investing in HSBC's proprietary branch network. He chaired both the China Development Forum and the Mayor of Shanghai's International Business Leaders' Advisory Council and joined the Advisory Board of Tsinghua School of Economics and Management.

Bond led HSBC to devoting considerable resources to corporate social responsibility, recognising the bank's responsibilities to the environment and the communities in which it operates. He was also behind HSBC's strong interest in the demographic changes being wrought by an ageing world.

His management style is modest, and in interviews Bond preferred to discuss HSBC rather than himself. He attributed his rise to the top of HSBC as a result of being in the right place at the right time. In an interview in 2005, he noted being driven more by a fear of failure, of letting down shareholders, customers and staff, rather than a sense of personal aggrandizement.

Bond was a director of Ford Motor Company. He has been a governor of the English-Speaking Union, and was chairman of the Institute of International Finance from 1998 to 2003.

On 28 November 2005, HSBC announced that Bond would step down as chairman from May 2006, to be succeeded by the bank's CEO, Stephen Green. It was later announced that Bond would be taking over from Lord MacLaurin as chairman of the British telecommunications company Vodafone. In February 2011 he was succeeded by Gerard Kleisterlee as the Vodafone chairman. Bond became chairman of the mining conglomerate in March 2011 Xstrata.

== Personal life ==
Bond is married to Elizabeth, Lady Bond, with whom he has two daughters and a son. His elder daughter Annabelle Bond is the fourth British woman to have climbed Mount Everest and the woman to have scaled the Seven Summits in the briefest period of time.

== Honours ==
Bond was knighted in 1999 for services to banking.

In 2005, he received the Golden Plate Award of the American Academy of Achievement, presented by Michael Bloomberg, Mayor of New York City, during the International Achievement Summit in New York City.

In 2006, he received the Outstanding Leadership in Business Practices Award for his achievements in propelling HSBC’s growth through a series of outstanding acquisitions in America and Asia, and in creating an internationally recognized global banking brand.

In March 2007, at the European Business Awards, he was given a lifetime achievement award.

Preceded by Sir William Purves	Group Chief Executive of HSBC Holdings; 1993–1998	Succeeded by Keith Whitson
Preceded by Sir William Purves	Group Chairman of HSBC Holdings; 1998–2006	Succeeded by Stephen Green
