= Keith Whitson =

British banker

Sir Keith Roderick Whitson (born 25 March 1943) is a British banker, CEO of HSBC Group until 2003.

He was succeeded by Stephen Green, Baron Green of Hurstpierpoint.

Business positions
| Preceded by John Bond | Group Chief Executive of HSBC Group; 1998–2003 | Succeeded by Stephen Green |
