= IP Group =

British technology investment company

IP Group plc
- Type: Public
- Traded as: LSE: IPO; FTSE 250 component
- Industry: Intellectual property
- Founded: 2001
- Headquarters: London, England, UK
- Key people: Michael Queen, Chairman; Greg Smith, CEO
- Revenue: ▲£79.8 million (2025)
- Operating income: ▲£61.0 million (2025)
- Net income: ▲£66.9 million (2025)
- Website: www.ipgroupplc.com

IP Group plc, formerly known as IP2IPO Group plc, is a British-based early-stage investor, backing IP-based technology companies, based in London, England. It is listed on the London Stock Exchange and is a constituent of the FTSE 250 Index.

== History ==
The business was founded in 2001 by David Norwood and Beeson Gregory as IP2IPO. It floated on the Alternative Investment Market in 2003 before achieving a full listing in 2006: it raised an additional £55m in June 2011. It acquired Top Technology Ventures in 2004, Techtran in January 2005, Fusion IP in March 2014 and Parkwalk Advisors, an EIS fund management business, in December 2016. IP Group then acquired Touchstone Innovations plc in 2017.

The origins of IP Group trace back to its first major university partnership with the University of Oxford. In December 2000, the business—then operating as IP2IPO—entered into a fifteen‑year agreement with the University of Oxford’s Chemistry Department under which IP2IPO acquired 50 per cent of the university’s equity and licensing income from chemistry‑related spin‑out companies. In return, IP2IPO committed substantial investment to support the department, including contributions towards the construction of new laboratory facilities.

The agreement was among the earliest large‑scale intellectual property commercialisation partnerships between a UK university department and an external investor, and it helped establish a model that IP Group later expanded to other universities and research institutions.

David Norwood stepped down from the business in 2008. Alan Aubrey became CEO in 2006 after the acquisition of Techtran before stepping down in 2021. Greg Smith, who was chief financial officer, became chief executive at that time, while David Baynes, chief operating officer, replaced Greg Smith as well as keeping his existing responsibility.

It was announced in January 2026 that Sir Douglas Flint, who was appointed as chair in 2018, would stand down in June 2026 to focus on his role at Prudential plc, following which Michael Queen, the former CEO of 3i Group plc, became chair.

== Operations ==
IP Group operates as a long‑term investor in science and technology companies, providing capital and support from early‑stage formation through to later‑stage growth and exit. The group focuses on the commercialisation of intellectual property originating from universities and research institutions, particularly in the areas of deep technology, life sciences and clean technology.

The company invests both directly on its own balance sheet and through managed investment platforms, and typically takes a long‑term approach to portfolio development rather than operating as a traditional time‑limited venture capital fund.

IP Group develops and supports businesses in deep technology, life sciences and clean technology, and also backs innovation from universities and research institutions through funds managed by Parkwalk Advisors.

The company specialises in the commercialisation of university intellectual property rights.

IP Group has exposure to weight loss drugs being developed by Pfizer.

== Parkwalk Advisors ==
Parkwalk Advisors is an Enterprise Investment Scheme (EIS) fund manager focused on investing in university spin‑out companies and research‑led technology businesses, primarily in the United Kingdom. IP Group completed the acquisition of Parkwalk Advisors in February 2017 following regulatory approval by the Financial Conduct Authority.

Following the acquisition, Parkwalk Advisors has continued to operate as a fund management platform within IP Group, managing EIS funds investing in early‑stage technology companies originating from leading UK universities.

== Financials ==
In its annual results for the year ended 31 December 2025, IP Group reported NAV per share of 110.4p and closing NAV of £975.1m, with gross cash and deposits of £211.0m.

The same announcement reported third-party AUM of £557m (Parkwalk) and a £75m buyback programme that retired 9% of share capital during the year.

== Notable investments ==
IP Group has held investments in companies including Oxford Nanopore Technologies, First Light Fusion, Hysata and Oxa. In 2024, IP Group stated it had helped found Oxford Nanopore in 2005.

Oxford Nanopore Technologies is a life sciences company that develops nanopore‑based sequencing technologies for the analysis of DNA and RNA. The company completed an initial public offering on the London Stock Exchange in 2021. IP Group was involved in the early formation of Oxford Nanopore and remained a significant shareholder following the IPO.

Featurespace is a Cambridge‑founded artificial intelligence company specialising in real‑time detection of fraud and financial crime. In December 2024, Featurespace was acquired by Visa and became part of Visa’s Risk and Identity Solutions business. IP Group was an early institutional investor in the company.

Hinge Health is a digital healthcare company that provides software‑enabled musculoskeletal care. In May 2025, the company completed an initial public offering on the New York Stock Exchange under the ticker symbol HNGE. IP Group was an early investor in Hinge Health and realised proceeds following the IPO.

First Light Fusion is a UK‑based fusion energy company developing inertial fusion technology. IP Group has backed the company since its early stages as it works towards the commercialisation of fusion‑based energy systems.

Ceres Power is a UK‑based clean energy company developing fuel cell and electrolysis technology for power generation and green hydrogen. IP Group first invested in Ceres Power in 2012 and supported the company through its development as a publicly listed business. In 2020, IP Group realised a significant portion of its holding through a series of share sales, as part of its capital recycling strategy.

== IP Group Australia ==
IP Group expanded its operations to Australia in 2017, establishing IP Group Australia to support the commercialisation of research‑led intellectual property from universities in Australia and New Zealand. As part of its expansion, IP Group Australia entered into long‑term commercialisation agreements with nine leading universities, including several members of Australia’s Group of Eight, committing to invest up to A$200 million over a ten‑year period to support university spin‑out companies.

The agreements marked the first large‑scale university intellectual property commercialisation platform of their type in Australasia and were modelled on IP Group’s earlier partnerships with universities in the United Kingdom.

Since its establishment, IP Group Australia has invested in a portfolio of university spin‑outs across sectors including clean energy, life sciences and advanced technology, working in partnership with institutional investors such as Australian superannuation funds to support the long‑term development of research‑derived companies.
