= Autorité des Marchés Financiers (France) =

Securities and exchange commission of France

Financial Markets Authority
- Autorité des marchés financiers

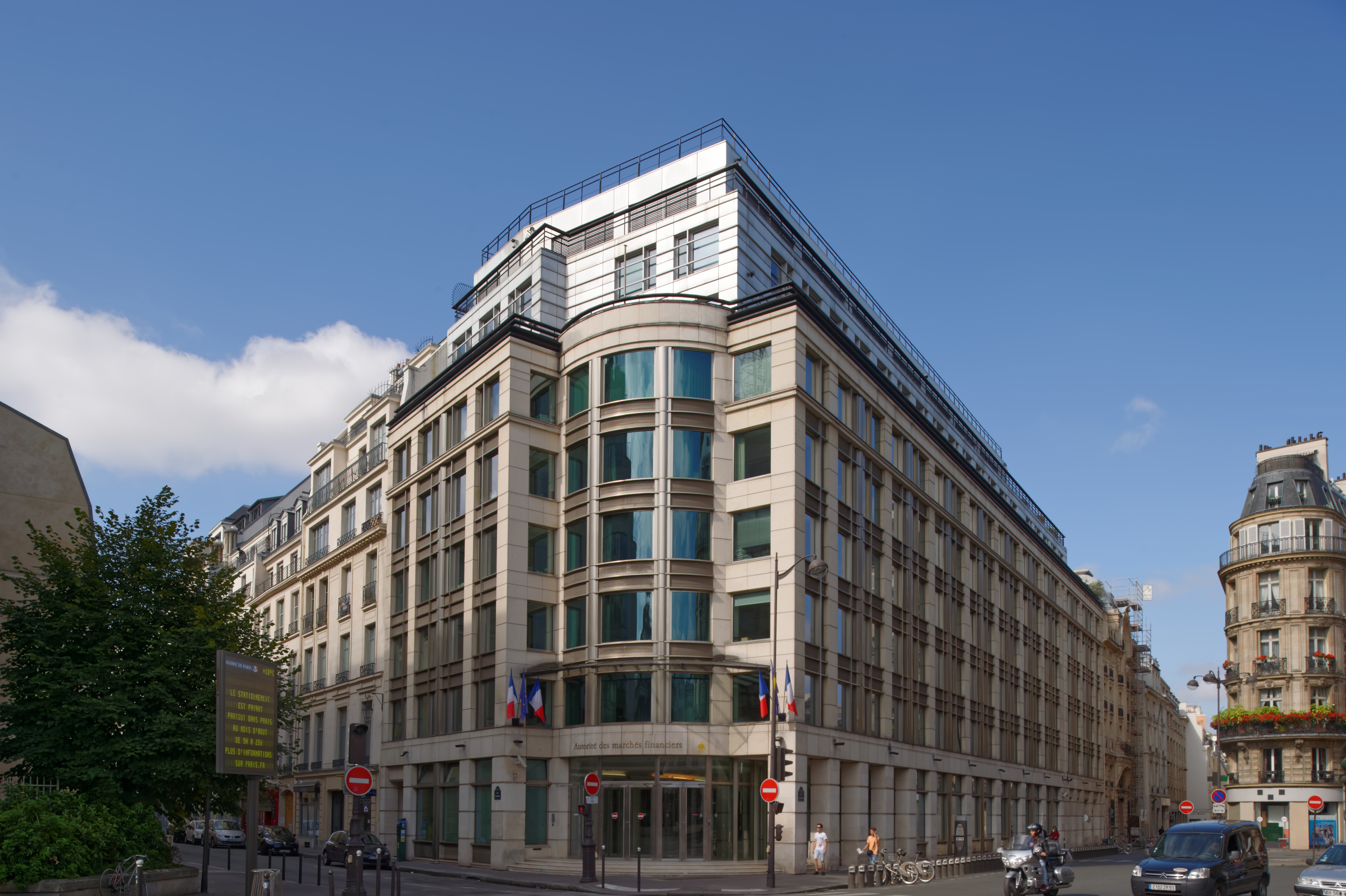
- Head office on place de la Bourse, Paris

Agency overview
- Formed: 1 August 2003
- Jurisdiction: France
- Headquarters: Paris, France
- Agency executive: Marie-Anne Barbat-Layani, Chairman
- Website: http://www.amf-france.org

The Autorité des marchés financiers (AMF; English: "Financial Markets Authority") is the securities commission in France. The AMF is an independent public body that is responsible for safeguarding investments in financial instruments and in all other savings and investments, as well as maintaining orderly financial markets.

Whereas it is governed under a national framework of accountability, the AMF increasingly implements policies set at the European Union level. It is a voting member of the Board of Supervisors of the European Securities and Markets Authority (ESMA). It is also a member of the European Systemic Risk Board (ESRB).

== Background ==
France's first securities commission, the Commission des Opérations de Bourse (COB, lit. 'Exchange Transactions Commission'), was established in 1967 as part of the financial reform package promoted by Finance Minister Michel Debré. Its successive presidents included André Postel-Vinay (1973-1974), Jean Donnedieu de Vabres (1974-1980), Bernard Tricot (1980-1984), Yves Le Portz (1984-1988), Jean Farge (1988-1989), Jean Saint-Geours (1989-1995), and finally Michel Prada (1995-2003).

In 2003, the COB merged with the Conseil des Marchés Financiers (CMF, lit. 'Financial Markets Council') and the Conseil de Discipline de la Gestion Financière (CDGF, lit. 'Council for Conduct in Asset Management') to form the AMF.

== Overview ==
The AMF was established by the Financial Security Act of 1 August 2003, as an independent public body with legal personality and financial autonomy, with the duty of:

- Safeguard investments in financial instruments and in all other savings and investment vehicles
- Ensure that investors receive material information
- Maintain orderly financial markets

It falls under the European regulatory umbrella of the Markets in Financial Instruments Directive (MiFID).

== Substantial shareholdings ==
Shareholders are required to notify their holdings to the AMF when their stake exceeds or falls below certain thresholds. According to the act of 26 July 2005, the lowest disclosure threshold is 5% (article l. 233-7 of the commercial code). Pursuant, the same article allows that companies can set additional notification thresholds in their articles of association. In July 2012, after Jacques Delmas-Marsalet took on the interim presidency of the AMF, the competent parliamentary committees gave the green light to the appointment of Gérard Rameix as head of the AMF, replacing Jean-Pierre Jouyet. He was appointed Chairman of the AMF by a decree dated August 1.

== Leadership ==
The successive chairs (French: Président) of the AMF have been:

- Michel Prada (2003-2008)
- Jean-Pierre Jouyet (2008-2012)
- Gérard Rameix (2012-2017)
- Robert Ophèle (2017-2022)
- Marie-Anne Barbat-Layani (since 2022)

The role of chief executive officer, referred to as Secretary-General (French: secrétaire général), has been held successively by:

- Gérard Rameix (2003-2009)
- Thierry Francq (2009-2012)
- Benoît de Juvigny (2012-2023)
- Sébastien Raspiller (since 2023)

== See also ==
- Economy of France
- Securities Commission
- Autorité des marchés financiers (Quebec)
- Financial Markets Authority of the West African Monetary Union
- List of financial supervisory authorities by country
