= Walbrook Institute London =

UK professional standards body for financial advisors

- Established: 1879 as the Institute of Bankers; 2023 as LIBF Limited
- Type: For-profit education provider and professional body
- Location: 25 Lovat Ln, London EC3R 8EB
- Official language: English
- Vice Chancellor and Chief Executive: Steve Hill
- Parent organisation: IU Group
- Website: www.walbrook.ac.uk
- Formerly called: 2016: The London Institute of Banking & Finance (LIBF); 2013: ifs University College; 1997: The Institute of Financial Services (IFS); 1987: The Chartered Institute of Bankers; 1879: The Institute of Bankers

Walbrook Institute London is a for-profit provider of apprenticeships, degrees and professional qualifications, with students being members of the LIBF professional body. It is one of three bodies in the UK accredited by the Financial Conduct Authority to maintain professional standards for financial advisors that use its services.

It was spun off in 2023 under the name LIBF from the London Institute of Banking & Finance (which continued its other charitable activities, including the award of Chartered Associate status, under the name of the London Foundation for Banking & Finance) and became a subsidiary of IU Group. LIBF changed its name to the Walbrook Institute London in 2025, with the LIBF brand continuing to be used for professional qualifications.

== History ==
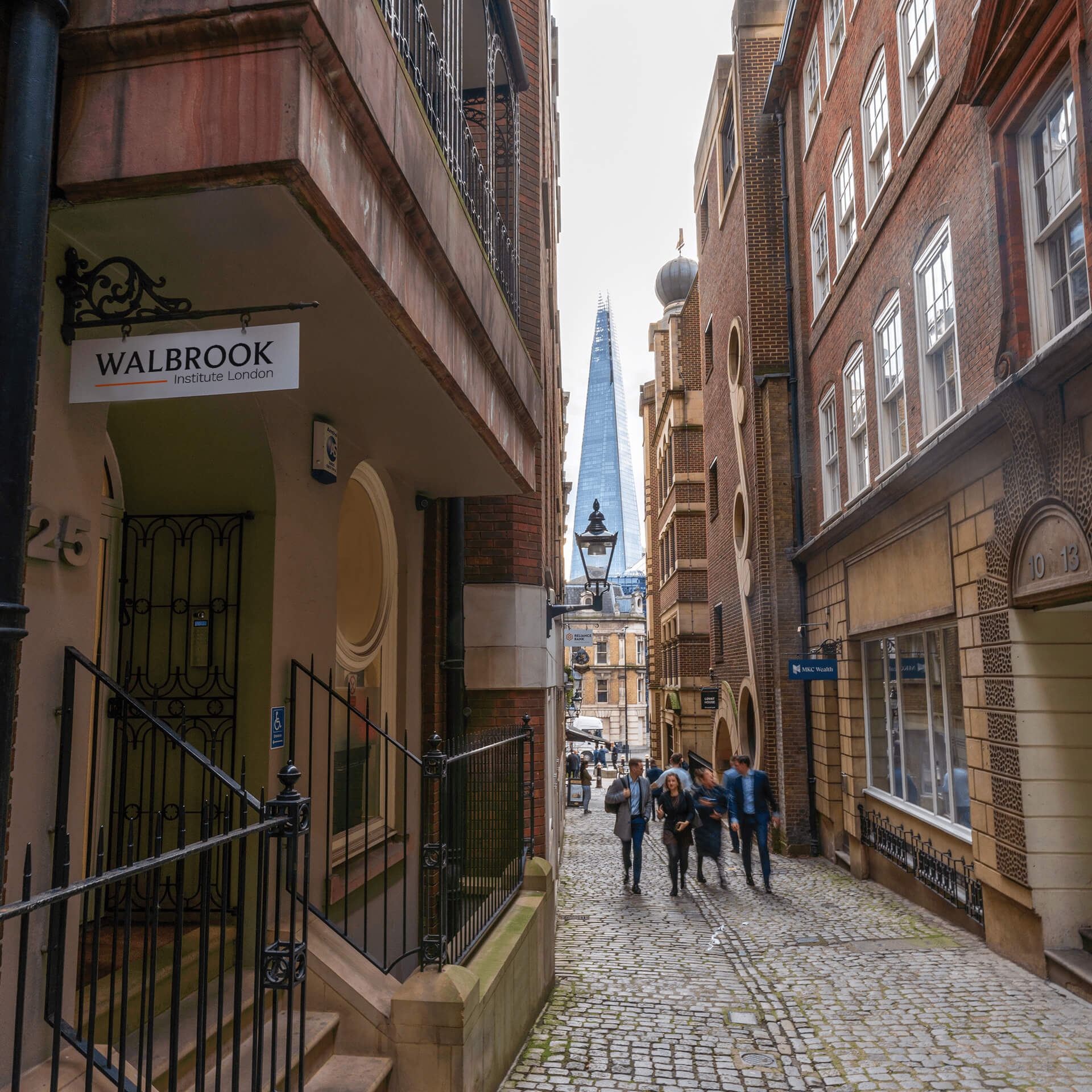
Walbrook Institute London student campus entrance at Lovat Lane

The Institute of Bankers was established in 1879. It was established by bank workers who saw a need for professional standards and education in the industry. This idea received relative popularity, gaining 2,000 members by the end of its first year. The first exams took place in 1880 and were opened to women in 1917 – a year before women were given the vote in the UK but after the degrees of all British universities except Oxford and Cambridge.

The institute gained a royal charter in 1987, becoming the Chartered Institute of Bankers, and in 1993 merged with the Chartered Building Societies Institute.

In 1996, the institute offered its first degree – the BSc (Hons) in financial services – offered as a dual award with the University of Manchester Institute of Science and Technology. It was the first professional award to be linked to a university degree.

The name changed in 1997 to the Institute of Financial Services. In the same year, the Certificate in Mortgage Advice and Practice (CeMAP) was introduced – this was the first qualification for UK mortgage professionals.

In 2001 the institute launched the first personal finance qualifications for young people in the UK, equivalent to an AS-level. In the same year, the institute became the first educational body in the sector to provide electronic assessment for its regulatory qualifications.

After becoming the IFS School of Finance in 2006, the institute was granted taught degree awarding powers (TDAP) by the privy council in 2010. It was then able to award both undergraduate and taught postgraduate degrees in its own right without validation from a third-party university. The Department for Business, Innovation and Skills (BIS) granted the title 'University College' in 2013, and in 2016 the Institute became The London Institute of Banking & Finance.

On 31 March 2023, the institute changed its name to the London Foundation for Banking & Finance, retaining its status as an educational charity, and a new limited company, LIBF Limited was created. The institute's operations and Ofqual-recognised awarding powers were transferred to the new company on 31 March 2023. On the same date, the new company became a wholly owned subsidiary of IU Group, owners of IU International University of Applied Sciences based in Erfurt, Germany. The institute's activities remain unchanged but, as a result of the constitutional change, LIBF Limited lost the right to use the title 'University' or 'University College'.

The ongoing educational charity, now known as the London Foundation for Banking & Finance (LFBF) continues to award Chartered Associate status and to carry out the institute's various charitable activities.

In 2025, LIBF expanded to offer qualifications on topics beyond banking and finance. To reflect this broader focus, the institution changed its name to Walbrook Institute London in 2025. The new name references the subterranean River Walbrook. LIBF remains a key part of Walbrook Institute, continuing to oversee its banking and finance qualifications.

== Academic profile ==
=== Degree awarding powers ===
Walbrook Institute London, holds UK taught degree awarding powers, allowing it to grant degrees up to taught master's degree level. The London Institute of Banking & Finance's Ofqual recognition was transferred to Walbrook Institute London in 2023, then known as LIBF.

=== Professional qualifications ===
LIBF is the provider of the CeMAP qualification, and has trained over 100,000 qualified mortgage advisers. It is an FCA Accredited Body and also offers qualifications at Level 4 and Level 6 for regulated financial advisers (DipFA and Adv DipFA). As part of its role as an FCA Accredited Body it issues Statements of Professional Standing (SPS) which are required for those practising as a professional retail investment adviser, and has a publicly searchable Professional Services Register. It also provides international qualifications in trade finance (CDCS, CSCF, CSDG and CTFC) and international banking qualifications. Members and students of LIBF undertake continuing professional development (CPD) and professional programmes in finance which can lead to chartered status.

=== International centres and partnerships ===
LIBF works in partnership with institutes and banks around the world. It is an academic partner of the International Chamber of Commerce, with senior members of staff contributing to several ICC taskforces.

==== LIBF MENA ====
LIBF's Abu Dhabi office provides education and training to the banking and finance sector in the Gulf Council Countries, and the Middle East and North Africa region.

Since 2017, LIBF MENA has been working in partnership with Abu Dhabi Global Markets Academy (ADGMA). ADGMA and LIBF have set up a learning centre to provide education in banking and financial services to young Emirati professionals. The learning centre also publishes research, contributes to debates and forums and provides peer-to-peer engagement opportunities.

==== LIBF APAC ====
LIBF APAC is based in Singapore where it works in partnership with the International Chamber of Commerce Academy and the Institute of Banking and Finance.

==== LIBF India ====
LIBF India was established in 2023 to provide professional and executive qualifications, certificates and customised training solutions to banking and finance professionals in the Indian subcontinent.

=== Financial education in schools ===
Up until 2024, LIBF offered Financial Capability qualifications specifically designed for 14 to 19 year olds in the UK, but it has announced that no new students will be enrolled for these qualifications after November 2023, and they will be phased-out by 2026. Thereafter, these activities will be undertaken by the Youth Financial Capability Group (YFCG) of which London Foundation for Banking and Finance is an Observer Member

== Initiatives and programmes ==
=== Research centres and thought leadership ===
In 2019, The London Institute of Banking & Finance set up two research centres – the Centre for Digital Finance and Banking, and the centre for Sustainable finance. The scope of the centre's work is global and addresses the interests and concerns of market participants including commercial and development banks, investors, governments, corporations or regulators.

=== Young Persons' Money Index ===
The London Foundation of Banking & Finance (the continuing charity) carries out the Young Persons' Money Index every year – a survey that tracks the delivery of finance education in schools in the UK. It also examines the attitudes, behaviour and experience of UK students in relation to money and personal finance.

=== Henry Grunfeld Foundation ===
The Henry Grunfeld Foundation was established in 1994 to further the careers of those working in the City of London. The London Institute of Banking & Finance (now renamed The London Foundation for Banking & Finance) was invited to assume control of the Grunfeld Foundation in the mid-1990s with the Board of Governors acting as trustees. The Foundation has funded scholarships for the full-time undergraduate programme, as well as learning resource provision, including the Henry Grunfeld Library at the campus in Lovat Lane. The Foundation also funds research fellowships and supports a longstanding commitment to INSEAD.

=== Financial World ===
Financial World is LIBF's journal, published quarterly in association with the Centre for The Study of Financial Innovation (CSFI). It brings together research and commentary on the structure and development of the domestic and international financial services sector and the wider economy and is distributed to students, members and subscribers.

== See also ==
- Chartered Banker Institute
- Worshipful Company of International Bankers
- Chartered Institute for Securities & Investment
- Amsterdam Institute of Finance
- New York Institute of Finance
- Swiss Finance Institute
