= Centre for the Study of Financial Innovation =

London-based think tank

- Abbreviation: CSFI
- Formation: 1993
- Type: Thought leadership and research
- Purpose: Think tank
- Location: United Kingdom
- Official language: English

The Centre for the Study of Financial Innovation (CSFI) is a think tank established in 1993 that seeks to engage in and promote free and progressive discussion about the challenges and opportunities facing the modern financial services sector. The aim of our research is to open thought-provoking debate about the financial services, with a view to making the industry more transparent, more inclusive and, above all, more sustainable. Following many years of collaboration on events and debates, and on Financial World, LIBF’s quarterly magazine, CSFI formally joined LIBF in November 2022.

== Activities ==
The CSFI holds round-table meetings, bringing together finance practitioners, regulators, academics and members of the professions. Prospect Magazine, in its annual Think Tank Awards for 2012, said: "The Centre for the Study of Financial Innovation retains its good reputation for scrutinising regulations and for roundtables".

The work of the CSFI focuses on the most significant drivers of change in the industry, including:

- technology – the potential impact of AI and other digital advances
- sustainable finance – the role of banks and financial regulators in tackling the risks associated with climate change
- finance for an ageing society – innovative solutions to pensions, housing and demographic issues
- the UK and Europe – the new world of trade and regulation
- financial inclusion – empowerment and education.

Other activities include hosting webinars, producing podcasts and writing and publishing a variety of written content including reports, white papers, short articles and blogs.

== Publications ==
As of 2023 CSFI has published 120 reports on subjects of interest to financial services, including technology, new products, regulatory issues and risk management.

Perhaps best known is the Banana Skins series which, for more than a decade, has provided a risk barometer of the banking sector and, more recently, insurance and microfinance. Other publications which have received notable attention include The Cost of Inequality - putting a price on health (July 2021) and The Digital Currency Revolution (April 2020).

The Centre has editorial responsibility for Financial World, a magazine published quarterly by LIBF, with a global circulation of 22,000. The CSFI has published two books: The Credit Crunch Diaries (2009), by David Lascelles and Nick Carn, and Grumpy Old Bankers (2009).

== See also ==
- The London Institute of Banking & Finance
- London International Financial Futures and Options Exchange - established by member of CSFI gov council member
- New Financial
