= David Norwood =

English chess grandmaster (born 1968)

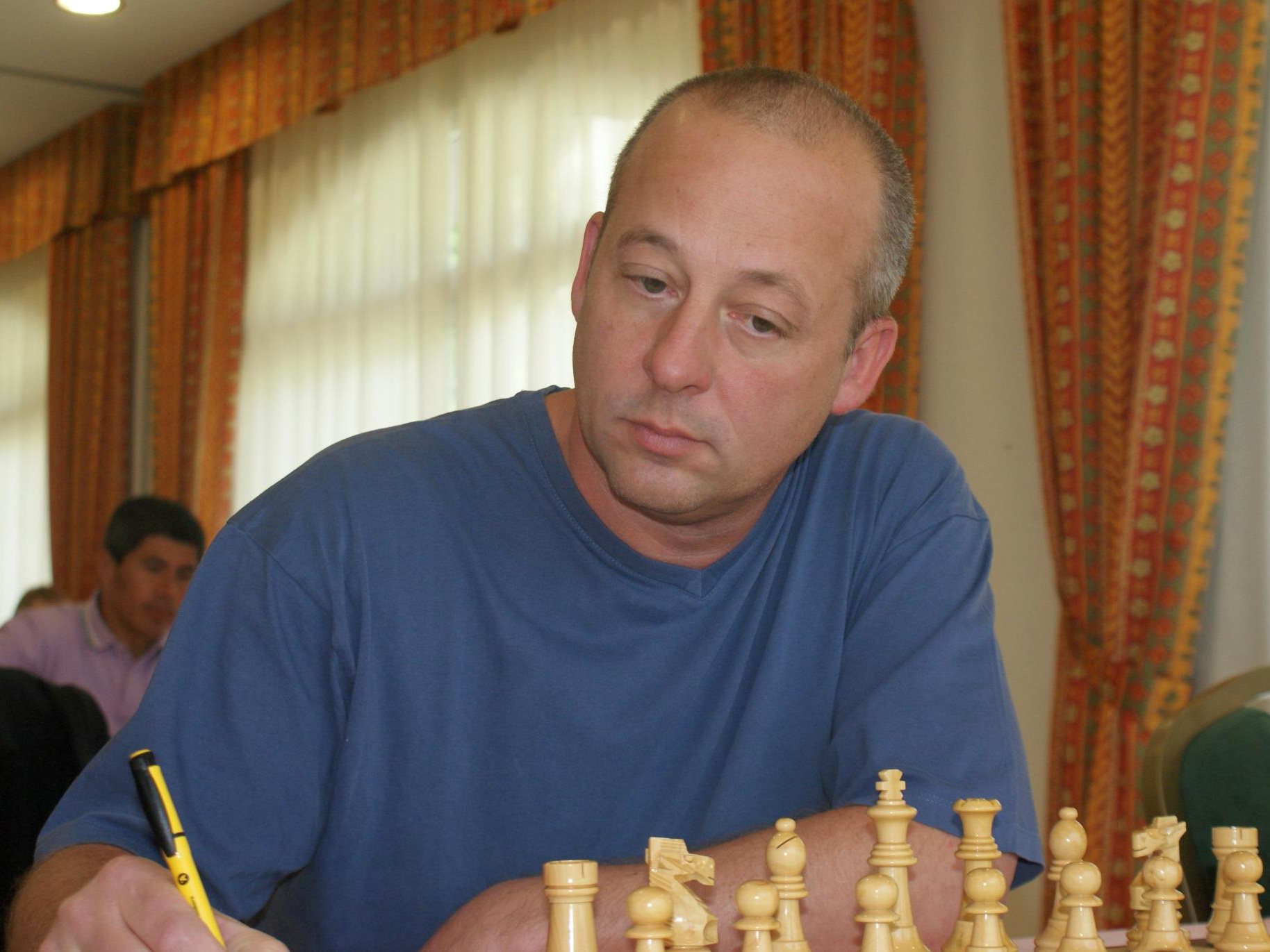
- David Norwood (2012)

Personal information
- Born: David Robert Norwood; 3 October 1968 (age 57) Farnworth, England

Chess career
- Country: England (until 2011); Andorra (since 2011)
- Title: Grandmaster (1989)
- FIDE rating: 2494 (September 2026)
- Peak rating: 2545 (July 1994)

David Robert Norwood (born 3 October 1968) is an English chess grandmaster and writer. He is the former captain of the English chess team and has represented England and Andorra at chess.

== Career ==
The son of an electrician, Norwood graduated with a history degree from Keble College, Oxford in 1988 before joining city investment bank Banker's Trust in 1991.

Norwood cofounded Oxford Sciences Innovation, a £1.2bn investment firm creating science companies from Oxford University, and was its CEO from 2015 to 2019. Formerly he was founder of IP Group plc, a fund that invested in spinoffs from Oxford University's Chemistry department, in exchange for 50% of the revenues from the licensing of the department's intellectual property.

In 2017, Norwood donated £1.9M to Keble College's future hub for innovation at Oxford University.

== Chess ==
FIDE awarded Norwood the International Master title in 1985 and the International Grandmaster title in 1989. He is less active as an over-the-board player these days, but maintains a strong interest in chess as a member of the Internet Chess Club. He has on a number of occasions captained, managed, or sponsored the England squad in major team events such as the Chess Olympiad.

Norwood has written several books including Winning with the Modern (the Modern Defence being a favorite opening of his) and Steve Davis plays Chess (co-authored with Steve Davis). He has also written many articles on chess for The Daily Telegraph.

He also made a large donation in 2001 to the British Chess Federation to assist with the development of junior chess.

=== Illustrative games ===
In the following game, Norwood's hypermodern opening leads to an old-fashioned king hunt:

Norwood-Marsh, Walsall 1992

1. g3 d5
2. Nf3 Nf6
3. Bg2 e6
4. O-O Be7
5. d3 c5
6. Nbd2 Nc6
7. e4 b6
8. e5 Nd7
9. Re1 Qc7
10. Qe2 Bb7
11. h4 O-O-O
12. a3 h6
13. h5 Rdg8
14. c4 d4
15. b4 g6
16. bxc5 bxc5
17. hxg6 Rxg6
18. Rb1 h5
19. Ne4 h4
20. Bg5 Bf8
21. Nxh4 Rgg8
22. Nf3 Rh7
23. Nd6+ Bxd6
24. exd6 Qxd6
25. Bf4 Qe7
26. Rxb7 Kxb7
27. Qe4 f5 (diagram below)
28. Qxc6+!! Kxc6
29. Nxd4+ Kb6
30. Rb1+ Ka6
31. Bb7+ Ka5
32. Bd2+ Ka4
33. Bc6+ Kxa3
34. Bc1+ Ka2
35. Rb2+ Ka1
36. Nc2# 1-0

Norwood vs. Marsh, Walsall 1992

Position: g8 black rook, a7 black pawn, b7 black king, d7 black knight, e7 black queen, h7 black rook, c6 black knight, e6 black pawn, c5 black pawn, f5 black pawn, c4 white pawn, d4 black pawn, e4 white queen, f4 white bishop, a3 white pawn, d3 white pawn, f3 white knight, g3 white pawn, f2 white pawn, g2 white bishop, e1 white rook, g1 white king

Position after 27...f5
Norwood vs. Marsh, Walsall 1992

Position: g8 black rook, a7 black pawn, d7 black knight, e7 black queen, h7 black rook, c6 white bishop, e6 black pawn, c5 black pawn, f5 black pawn, c4 white pawn, d3 white pawn, g3 white pawn, b2 white rook, c2 white knight, f2 white pawn, a1 black king, c1 white bishop, g1 white king

Final position

== Books ==
- Norwood, David (1991). King's Indian Attack. Trends Publications.
- Norwood, David (1995). The Modern Benoni. Cadogan. ISBN 91-976005-2-0.
- Norwood, David (1995). Chess Puzzles. Henry Holt and Company, Inc. ISBN 0-8050-4226-1.
