= Investment Association =

British trade association

The Investment Association
- Abbreviation: IA
- Predecessor: Investment Management Association
- Formation: 2001; 25 years ago
- Type: Trade association
- Purpose: Representing the Investment management industry
- Location: London, United Kingdom
- Region served: United Kingdom
- Products: Training to ensure compliance with regulation, providing industry best practise and representing member to policy makers.
- Members: 250 (2021)
- Website: www.theinvestmentassociation.org

The Investment Association (IA) is a British trade association that represents the investment management industry in the United Kingdom.

As of 2016, there were over 250 corporate members.

== History ==
The Association of Unit Trust and Investment Funds (AUTIF) was established in 1959. In 1993 it merged with the Fund Managers Association to form the Investment Management Association (IMA).

From 2017 to 2025, the IA hosted the Public Register of executive compensation and shareholder revolts at annual general meetings to help curb "abuses and excess".

In 2025, the Labour government ordered its discontinuance to cut red tape as the information was also available through the UK Corporate Governance Code, though not so easy to access.

== Renaming ==
In 2015, the trade body was renamed The Investment Association, following the merger between the IMA and the Investment Affairs division of the Association of British Insurers.

== See also ==
- Pacific Horizon Investment Trust
