= New Financial =

UK think tank

- Type: Private
- Industry: Think Tank
- Founded: 2014
- Founder: William Wright

New Financial is a London-based think tank created in 2014 by William Wright, a former journalist.

== Background ==
Wright studied history in the early 1990s at Merton College, Oxford and at University of London. He started his career in banking. In 1996 he joined Financial News and was its Editor from 2003 to 2011. He was instrumental in its sale to The Wall Street Journal in 2007. In 2007 he also completed an International Executive Program at INSEAD.

== Creation and history ==
Wright created New Financial in 2014 with the stated aim "to explain the role and purpose of capital markets, and to focus the industry on how it can best serve the wider economy."
