= H. H. Asquith =

Prime Minister of the United Kingdom from 1908 to 1916

The Right Honourable The Earl of Oxford and Asquith KG PC KC FRS
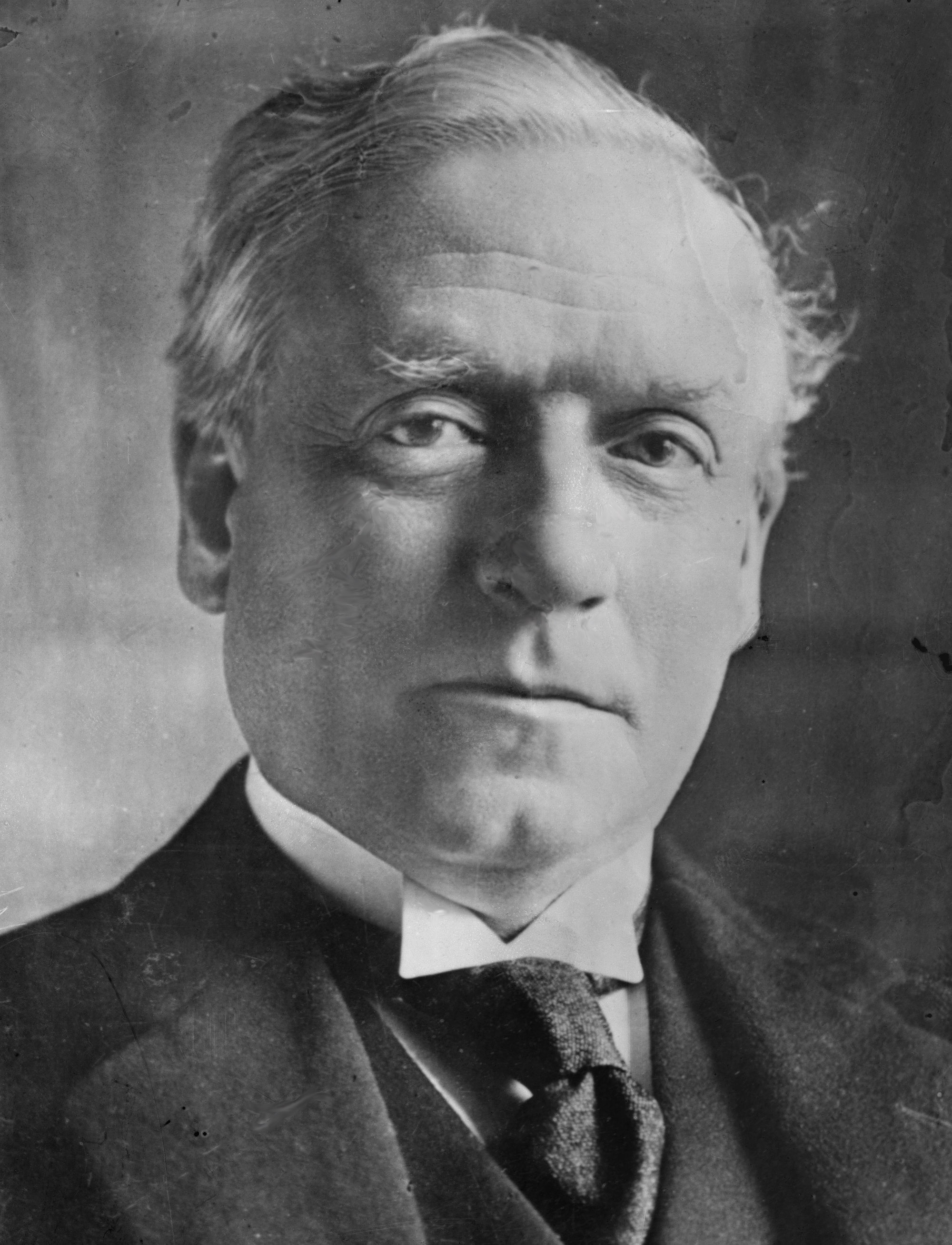
- Asquith c. 1910s

Prime Minister of the United Kingdom
- In office 5 April 1908 – 5 December 1916
- Monarchs: Edward VII; George V
- Preceded by: Henry Campbell-Bannerman
- Succeeded by: David Lloyd George
Senior political offices
Leader of the Opposition
In office 12 February 1920 – 21 November 1922
Monarch	George V
Prime Minister	David Lloyd George; Bonar Law
Preceded by	Donald Maclean
Succeeded by	Ramsay MacDonald
In office 6 December 1916 – 14 December 1918
Monarch	George V
Prime Minister	David Lloyd George
Preceded by	Edward Carson
Succeeded by	Donald Maclean
Leader of the Liberal Party
In office 30 April 1908 – 14 October 1926
Preceded by	Henry Campbell-Bannerman
Succeeded by	David Lloyd George
Ministerial portfolios
Secretary of State for War
In office 30 March 1914 – 5 August 1914
Prime Minister	Himself
Preceded by	J. E. B. Seely
Succeeded by	The Earl Kitchener
Chancellor of the Exchequer
In office 10 December 1905 – 12 April 1908
Prime Minister	Henry Campbell-Bannerman
Preceded by	Austen Chamberlain
Succeeded by	David Lloyd George
Home Secretary
In office 18 August 1892 – 25 June 1895
Prime Minister	William Ewart Gladstone; The Earl of Rosebery
Preceded by	Henry Matthews
Succeeded by	Matthew White Ridley

Member of the House of Lords
- Lord Temporal
- Hereditary peerage 10 February 1925 – 15 February 1928
- Preceded by: Peerage created
- Succeeded by: The 2nd Earl of Oxford and Asquith

Member of Parliament
- In office 12 February 1920 – 9 October 1924
- Preceded by: John McCallum
- Succeeded by: Edward Mitchell
- Constituency: Paisley
- In office 27 July 1886 – 25 November 1918
- Preceded by: John Boyd Kinnear
- Succeeded by: Alexander Sprot
- Constituency: East Fife

Personal details
- Born: Herbert Henry Asquith; 12 September 1852 Morley, West Yorkshire, England
- Died: 15 February 1928 (aged 75) Sutton Courtenay, Berkshire, England
- Resting place: All Saints' Church, Sutton Courtenay
- Party: Liberal
- Spouses: Helen Kelsall Melland (m. 1877; died 1891); Margot Tennant (m. 1894)
- Children: 10, including Raymond, Herbert, Arthur, Violet, Cyril, Elizabeth and Anthony
- Relatives: Asquith family
- Education: Balliol College, Oxford
- Profession: Barrister
- Asquith's voice Asquith on the Budget; Recorded 1909

Herbert Henry Asquith, 1st Earl of Oxford and Asquith (12 September 1852 – 15 February 1928), was a British statesman, Liberal politician and barrister who was Prime Minister of the United Kingdom from 1908 until his resignation in 1916. Having served as Leader of the Opposition from 1920 to 1922, Asquith was the last member of the Liberal Party to do so, and the last prime minister from the Party to command a majority government, which he had inherited from Henry Campbell-Bannerman. His government enacted major Liberal reforms and curtailed the power of the House of Lords. In 1914, Asquith led the United Kingdom and the British Empire into the First World War. During 1915, his government was vigorously attacked for a shortage of munitions and the failure of the Gallipoli Campaign.

After serving as Home Secretary under William Ewart Gladstone and Chancellor of the Exchequer under Henry Campbell-Bannerman, Asquith succeeded Campbell-Bannerman as prime minister in 1908. After the House of Lords rejected the People's Budget in 1909, Asquith fought two general elections in 1910 before securing passage of the Parliament Act 1911, which greatly reduced the Lords' power to block legislation. His unsuccessful attempts to introduce Irish Home Rule provoked repeated crises that led to gun running and violence, verging on civil war.

The outbreak of World War I suspended political conflicts over Irish Home Rule and women's suffrage. Asquith oversaw Britain's mobilisation for war, including the deployment of the British Expeditionary Force and the expansion of military and industrial production. Military setbacks led him to form a coalition government in 1915 with the Labour and Conservative Parties, but criticism of his leadership continued to grow. He was weakened by his own indecision over strategy, conscription and financing.

David Lloyd George replaced him as prime minister in December 1916, and the two subsequently fought for control of the declining Liberal Party. Historians have praised his role in the Liberal reforms of 1906–1911, which laid the foundations of the modern British welfare state, but criticise his leadership during the First World War. He had the longest continuous term as prime minister between 1827 and 1979, serving more than eight consecutive years.

== Early life: 1852–1874 ==
=== Family background ===
Asquith (left) with his sister Emily and elder brother William, c. 1857

Herbert Henry Asquith was born on 12 September 1852 in Morley, in the West Yorkshire, the younger son of Joseph Dixon Asquith (1825–1860) and his wife Emily, née Willans (1828–1888). The couple also had three daughters, of whom only one survived infancy. (Note: Some sources mention only two daughters. See Bates, p. 9. The brother and sister who survived into adulthood were William Willans and Emily Evelyn. See Margot Asquith 1962, p. 263.) The Asquiths were an old Yorkshire family, with a long nonconformist tradition. (Note: The surname, a variant of Askwith, a village in North Yorkshire, derives from Old Norse ask-viðr – "ash-wood". See Ekwall, p. 16.) It was a matter of family pride, shared by Asquith, that an ancestor, Joseph Asquith, was imprisoned for his part in the pro-Roundhead Farnley Wood Plot of 1664.

Asquith's parents came from families associated with the Yorkshire wool trade. Dixon Asquith inherited the Gillroyd Mill Company, founded by his father. Emily's father, William Willans, ran a successful wool-trading business in Huddersfield. Both families were middle-class, Congregationalist and politically radical. Dixon was a mild man, cultivated and in his son's words "not cut out" for a business career. He was described as "a man of high character who held Bible classes for young men". Emily suffered persistent poor health, but was of strong character, and a formative influence on her sons.

=== Childhood and schooling ===
In his younger days, he was called Herbert ("Bertie" as a child) within the family, but his second wife called him Henry. His biographer Stephen Koss entitled the first chapter of his biography "From Herbert to Henry", referring to upward social mobility and his abandonment of his Yorkshire Nonconformist roots with his second marriage. However, in public, he was invariably referred to only as H. H. Asquith. "There have been few major national figures whose Christian names were less well known to the public" according to his biographer Roy Jenkins.

Herbert Asquith and his brother were educated at home by their parents until 1860, when Dixon Asquith died suddenly. William Willans took charge of the family, moved them to a house near his own, and arranged for the boys' schooling. After a year at Huddersfield College they were sent as boarders to Fulneck School, a Moravian Church school near Leeds. In 1863 William Willans died, and the family came under the care of Emily's brother, John Willans. The boys went to live with him in London; when he moved back to Yorkshire in 1864 for business reasons, they remained in London and were lodged with various families.

The biographer Naomi Levine writes that in effect Asquith was "treated like an orphan" for the rest of his childhood. The departure of his uncle effectively severed Asquith's ties with his native Yorkshire, and he described himself thereafter as "to all intents and purposes a Londoner". Another biographer, Colin Matthew, writes that Asquith's northern nonconformist background continued to influence him: "It gave him a point of sturdy anti-establishmentarian reference, important to a man whose life in other respects was a long absorption into metropolitanism."

The boys were sent to the City of London School as day boys. Under the school's headmaster, E. A. Abbott, a distinguished classical scholar, Asquith became an outstanding pupil. He later said that he was under deeper obligations to his old headmaster than to any man living; Abbott disclaimed credit for the boy's progress: "I never had a pupil who owed less to me and more to his own natural ability." Asquith excelled in classics and English, was little interested in sport, read voraciously in the Guildhall Library and became fascinated with oratory. He visited the public gallery of the House of Commons, studied the techniques of famous preachers and honed his own skills in the school debating society. Abbott remarked on the cogency and clarity of his pupil's speeches, qualities for which Asquith became celebrated throughout the rest of his life. Asquith later recalled seeing, as a schoolboy, the corpses of five murderers left hanging outside Newgate.

=== Oxford ===
Early press mention of Asquith, 1869

In November 1869 Asquith won a classical scholarship at Balliol College, Oxford, going up the following October. The college's prestige, already high, continued to rise under the recently elected Master, Benjamin Jowett. He sought to raise the standards of the college to the extent that its undergraduates shared what Asquith later called a "tranquil consciousness of effortless superiority". Although Asquith admired Jowett, he was more influenced by T. H. Green, White's Professor of Moral Philosophy. The abstract side of philosophy did not greatly attract Asquith, whose outlook was always practical, but Green's progressive liberal political views appealed to him.

Asquith's university career was distinguished—"striking without being sensational" in the words of Jenkins. An easy grasp of his studies left him ample time to indulge his liking for debate. In the first month at university he spoke at the Oxford Union. His official biographers, J. A. Spender and Cyril Asquith, commented that in his first months at Oxford "he voiced the orthodox Liberal view, speaking in support, inter alia, of the disestablishment of the Church of England, and of non-intervention in the Franco-Prussian War". He sometimes debated against his Balliol contemporary Alfred Milner, who although then a Liberal was already an advocate of British imperialism. He was elected Treasurer of the Union in 1872 but was defeated at his first attempt at the Presidency. During the General Election in January and February 1874 he spoke against Lord Randolph Churchill, who was not yet a prominent politician, at nearby Woodstock. He eventually became President of the Union in Trinity Term 1874, his last term as an undergraduate.

Asquith was proxime accessit (runner-up) for the Hertford Prize in 1872, again proxime accessit for the Ireland Prize in 1873, and again for the Ireland in 1874, on that occasion coming so close that the examiners awarded him a special prize of books. However, he won the Craven Scholarship and graduated with what his biographers describe as an "easy" double first in Mods and Greats. After graduating he was elected to a prize fellowship of Balliol.

== Early professional career: 1874–1886 ==
=== After Oxford ===
Perhaps because of his stark beginnings, Asquith was always attracted to the comforts and accoutrements that money can buy. He was personally extravagant, always enjoying the good life—good food, good companions, good conversation and attractive women.

— Naomi Levine, in a 1991 biography

After his graduation in 1874, Asquith spent several months coaching Viscount Lymington, the 18-year-old son and heir of the Earl of Portsmouth. He found the experience of aristocratic country-house life agreeable. He liked less the austere side of the nonconformist Liberal tradition, with its strong temperance movement. He was proud of ridding himself of "the Puritanism in which I was bred". His fondness for fine wines and spirits, which began at this period, eventually earned him the sobriquet "Squiffy".

Returning to Oxford, Asquith spent the first year of his seven-year fellowship in residence there. But he had no wish to pursue a career as a don; the traditional route for politically ambitious but unmoneyed young men was through the law. While still at Oxford Asquith had already entered Lincoln's Inn to train as a barrister, and in 1875 he served a pupillage under Charles Bowen. He was called to the bar in June 1876.

=== Marriage and children ===
There followed what Jenkins calls "seven extremely lean years". Asquith set up a legal practice with two other junior barristers. With no personal contacts with solicitors, he received few briefs. (Note: The English legal profession is split into two branches. At that time, any member of the public needing legal representation in the High Court or Court of Appeal had to engage a solicitor – who would in turn "instruct" or "brief" a barrister – who had the sole right to appear before the higher courts, but was not permitted to take work direct from the public without a solicitor as intermediary. A barrister without good contacts with solicitors would therefore go short of work. The distinctions between the two branches of the profession have been relaxed to some extent since Asquith's time, but to a considerable degree barristers remain dependent on solicitors for work. See Terrill, p. 58.) Those that came his way he argued capably, but he was too fastidious to learn the wilier tricks of the legal trade: "he was constitutionally incapable of making a discreet fog ... nor could he prevail on himself to dispense the conventional patter". He did not allow his lack of money to stop him from marrying. His bride, Helen Kelsall Melland (1854–1891), was the daughter of Frederick Melland, a physician in Manchester. She and Asquith had met through friends of his mother's. The two had been in love for several years, but it was not until 1877 that Asquith sought her father's consent to their marriage. Despite Asquith's limited income—practically nothing from the bar and a small stipend from his fellowship—Melland consented after making inquiries about the young man's potential. Helen had a private income of several hundred pounds a year, and the couple lived in modest comfort in Hampstead. They had five children:

- Raymond Asquith (6 November 1878 – 15 September 1916), who married Katharine Horner (daughter of Sir John Horner) on 25 July 1907. They had three children.
- Herbert Asquith (11 March 1881 – 5 August 1947), who married Lady Cynthia Charteris (daughter of Hugo Richard Charteris, 11th Earl of Wemyss and 7th Earl of March) on 28 July 1910. They had three children.
- Arthur Asquith (24 April 1883 – 25 August 1939), who married Betty Constance Manners (daughter of John Manners-Sutton, 3rd Baron Manners) on 30 April 1918. They had four daughters.
- Violet Asquith (15 April 1887 – 19 February 1969), who married Sir Maurice Bonham Carter on 30 November 1915. They had four children.
- Cyril Asquith, Baron Asquith of Bishopstone (5 February 1890 – 24 August 1954), who married Anne Pollock (daughter of Sir Adrian Donald Wilde Pollock) on 12 February 1918. They had four children.

=== The Spectator and politics ===
Asquith in 1876

Between 1876 and 1884 Asquith supplemented his income by writing regularly for The Spectator, which at that time had a broadly Liberal outlook. Matthew comments that the articles Asquith wrote for the magazine give a good overview of his political views as a young man. He was staunchly radical, but as unconvinced by extreme left-wing views as by Toryism. Among the topics that caused debate among Liberals were British imperialism, the union of Great Britain and Ireland, and female suffrage. Asquith was a strong, though not jingoistic, proponent of the Empire, and, after initial caution, came to support home rule for Ireland. He opposed votes for women for most of his political career. According to the official biography by J. A. Spender and Cyril Asquith, H.H. Asquith "had a profound respect for the mind and intelligence of women ... but he considered politics to be peculiarly the male sphere, and it offended his sense of decorum and chivalry to think of them as engaged in the rough and tumble of this masculine business and exposed to its publicity. He always vehemently denied that the question had any relation to democratic theory or that the exclusion of women from the franchises was any reflection on their sex." There was also an element of party interest: Asquith believed that votes for women would disproportionately benefit the Conservatives. In a 2001 study of the extension of the franchise between 1832 and 1931, Bob Whitfield concluded that Asquith's surmise about the electoral impact was correct. In addition to his work for The Spectator, he was retained as a leader writer by The Economist, taught at evening classes, and marked examination papers.

Asquith's career as a barrister began to flourish in 1883 when R. S. Wright invited him to join his chambers at the Inner Temple. Wright was the Junior Counsel to the Treasury, a post often known as "the Attorney General's devil", whose function included giving legal advice to ministers and government departments. One of Asquith's first jobs in working for Wright was to prepare a memorandum for the prime minister, W. E. Gladstone, on the status of the parliamentary oath in the wake of the Bradlaugh case. Both Gladstone and the Attorney General, Sir Henry James, were impressed. This raised Asquith's profile, though not greatly enhancing his finances. Much more remunerative were his new contacts with solicitors who regularly instructed Wright and now also began to instruct Asquith.

== Member of Parliament: 1886–1908 ==
=== Queen's Counsel ===
In June 1886, with the Liberal party split on the question of Irish Home Rule, Gladstone called a general election. There was a last-minute vacancy at East Fife, where the sitting Liberal member, John Boyd Kinnear, had been deselected by his local Liberal Association for voting against Irish Home Rule. Richard Haldane, a close friend of Asquith's and also a struggling young barrister, had been Liberal MP for the nearby Haddingtonshire constituency since December 1885. He put Asquith's name forward as a replacement for Kinnear, and only ten days before polling Asquith was formally nominated in a vote of the local Liberals. The Conservatives did not contest the seat, putting their support behind Kinnear, who stood against Asquith as a Liberal Unionist. Asquith was elected with 2,863 votes to Kinnear's 2,489.

The Liberals lost the 1886 election, and Asquith joined the House of Commons as an opposition backbencher. He waited until March 1887 to make his maiden speech, which opposed the Conservative administration's proposal to give special priority to an Irish Crimes Bill. From the start of his parliamentary career Asquith impressed other MPs with his air of authority as well as his lucidity of expression. For the remainder of this Parliament, which lasted until 1892, Asquith spoke occasionally but effectively, mostly on Irish matters.

Asquith's legal practice was flourishing, and took up much of his time. In the late 1880s Anthony Hope, who later gave up the bar to become a novelist, was his pupil. Asquith disliked arguing in front of a jury because of the repetitiveness and "platitudes" required, but excelled at arguing fine points of civil law before a judge or in front of courts of appeal. These cases, in which his clients were generally large businesses, were unspectacular but financially rewarding.

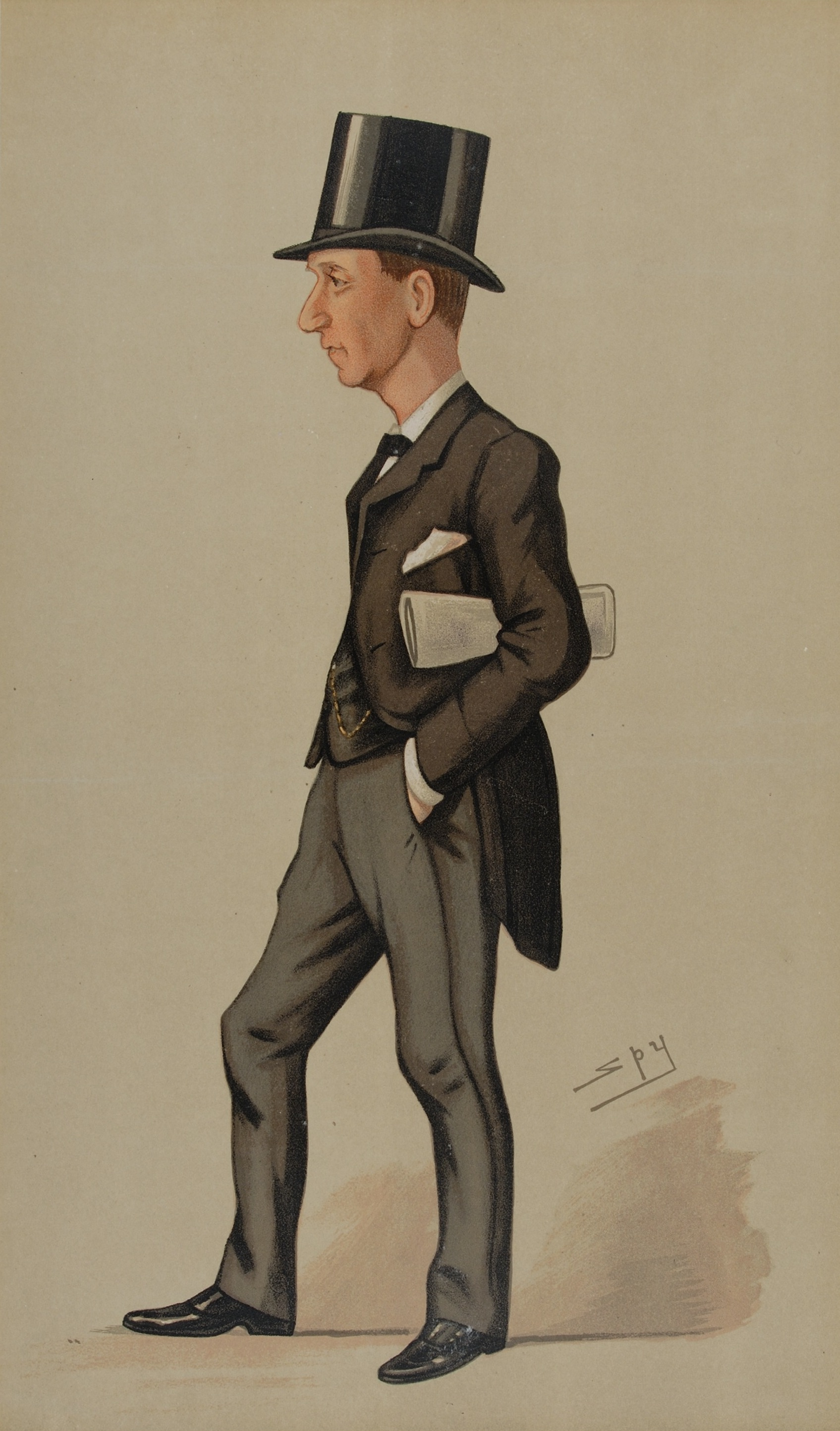
Asquith, caricatured by Spy, in Vanity Fair, 1891

From time to time Asquith appeared in high-profile criminal cases. In 1887 and 1888, he defended the radical Liberal MP Cunninghame Graham, who was charged with assaulting police officers when they attempted to break up a demonstration in Trafalgar Square. Graham was later convicted of the lesser charge of unlawful assembly. In what Jenkins calls "a less liberal cause", Asquith appeared for the prosecution in the trial of Henry Vizetelly for publishing "obscene libels"—the first English versions of Émile Zola's novels Nana, Pot-Bouille and La Terre, which Asquith described in court as "the three most immoral books ever published".

Asquith's law career received a great and unforeseen boost in 1889 when he was named junior counsel to Sir Charles Russell at the Parnell Commission of Enquiry. The commission had been set up in the aftermath of damaging statements in The Times, based on forged letters, that the Irish MP Charles Stuart Parnell had expressed approval of Dublin's Phoenix Park killings. When the manager of The Times, J. C. Macdonald, was called to give evidence Russell, feeling tired, surprised Asquith by asking him to conduct the cross-examination. Under Asquith's questioning, it became plain that in accepting the forgeries as genuine, without making any check, Macdonald had, in Jenkins's phrase, behaved "with a credulity which would have been childlike had it not been criminally negligent". The Manchester Guardian reported that under Asquith's cross-examination, Macdonald "squirmed and wriggled through a dozen half-formed phrases in an attempt at explanation, and finished none". The accusations against Parnell were shown to be false, The Times was obliged to make a full apology, and Asquith's reputation was assured. Within a year he had gained advancement to the senior rank of the bar, Queen's Counsel.

Asquith appeared in two important cases in the early 1890s. He played an effective low-key role in the sensational Tranby Croft libel trial (1891), helping to show that the plaintiff had not been libelled. He was on the losing side in Carlill v Carbolic Smoke Ball Co (1892), a landmark English contract law case that established that a company was obliged to meet its advertised pledges.

=== Widower and cabinet minister ===
In September 1891 Helen Asquith died of typhoid fever, following a few days' illness while the family were on holiday in Scotland. Asquith bought a house in Surrey, and hired nannies and other domestic staff. He sold the Hampstead property and took a flat on Mount Street in Mayfair, where he lived during the working week.

Margot Asquith at about the time of her marriage

The general election of July 1892 returned Gladstone and the Liberals to office, with intermittent support from the Irish Nationalist MPs. Asquith, who was then only 39 and had never served as a junior minister, accepted the post of Home Secretary, a senior Cabinet position. The Conservatives and Liberal Unionists jointly outnumbered the Liberals in the Commons, which, together with a permanent Unionist majority in the House of Lords, restricted the government's capacity to put reforming measures in place. Asquith failed to secure a majority for a bill to disestablish the Church in Wales, and another to protect workers injured at work, but he built up a reputation as a capable and fair minister.

In 1893 Asquith responded to a request from Magistrates in the Wakefield area for reinforcements to police a mining strike. Asquith sent 400 Metropolitan policeman. After two civilians were killed in Featherstone when soldiers opened fire on a crowd, Asquith was subject to protests at public meetings for a period. He responded to a taunt, "Why did you murder the miners at Featherstone in '92?" by saying, "It was not '92, it was '93."

When Gladstone retired in March 1894, Queen Victoria chose the Foreign Secretary, Lord Rosebery, as the new prime minister. Asquith thought Rosebery preferable to the other possible candidate, the Chancellor of the Exchequer, Sir William Harcourt, whom he deemed too anti-imperialist—one of the so-called "Little Englanders"—and too abrasive. Asquith remained at the Home Office until the government fell in 1895.

Asquith had known Margot Tennant slightly since before his wife's death, and grew increasingly attached to her in his years as a widower. On 10 May 1894 they were married at St George's, Hanover Square. Asquith became a son in law of Sir Charles Tennant, 1st Baronet. Margot was in many respects the opposite of Asquith's first wife, being outgoing, impulsive, extravagant and opinionated. Despite the misgivings of many of Asquith's friends and colleagues the marriage proved to be a success. Margot got on, if sometimes stormily, with her step-children. She and Asquith had five children of their own, only two of whom survived infancy: Anthony Asquith (9 November 1902 – 21 February 1968) and Elizabeth Asquith (26 February 1897 – 7 April 1945), who married the Romanian prince Antoine Bibesco on 30 April 1919.

==== Out of office ====
Sir Henry Campbell-Bannerman, Liberal leader from 1899

The general election of July 1895 was disastrous for the Liberals, and the Conservatives under Lord Salisbury won a majority of 152. With no government post, Asquith divided his time between politics and the bar. (Note: He was the first former cabinet minister to resume practice at the bar after leaving government office. All cabinet ministers were, and are, appointed as lifetime members of the Privy Council, and there had been an uncodified feeling before 1895 that it was inappropriate for a Privy Councillor to appear as an advocate in court, submitting to the rulings of judges who, for the most part, ranked below him in the official order of precedence. See Jenkins, pp. 90–91.) Jenkins comments that in this period Asquith earned a substantial, though not stellar, income and was never worse off and often much higher-paid than when in office. Matthew writes that his income as a QC in the following years was around £5,000 to £10,000 per annum (around £500,000–£1,000,000 at 2015 prices). According to Haldane, on returning to government in 1905 Asquith had to give up a £10,000 brief to act for the Khedive of Egypt. Margot later claimed (in the 1920s, when they were short of money) that he could have made £50,000 per annum had he remained at the bar.

The Liberal Party, with a leadership—Harcourt in the Commons and Rosebery in the Lords—who detested each other, once again suffered factional divisions. Rosebery resigned in October 1896 and Harcourt followed him in December 1898. Asquith came under strong pressure to accept the nomination to take over as Liberal leader, but the post of Leader of the Opposition, though full-time, was then unpaid, and he could not afford to give up his income as a barrister. He and others prevailed on the former Secretary of State for War Sir Henry Campbell-Bannerman to accept the post.

During the Boer War of 1899–1902 Liberal opinion divided along pro-imperialist and "Little England" lines, with Campbell-Bannerman striving to maintain party unity. Asquith was less inclined than his leader and many in the party to censure the Conservative government for its conduct, though he regarded the war as an unnecessary distraction. Joseph Chamberlain, a former Liberal minister, now an ally of the Conservatives, campaigned for tariffs to shield British industry from cheaper foreign competition. Asquith's advocacy of traditional Liberal free trade policies helped to make Chamberlain's proposals the central question in British politics in the early years of the 20th century. In Matthew's view, "Asquith's forensic skills quickly exposed deficiencies and self-contradictions in Chamberlain's arguments." The question divided the Conservatives, while the Liberals were united under the banner of "free fooders" against those in the government who countenanced a tax on imported essentials.

=== Chancellor of the Exchequer, 1905–1908 ===
Asquith as Chancellor of the Exchequer, in the House of Commons

Salisbury's Conservative successor as prime minister, Arthur Balfour, resigned in December 1905, but did not seek a dissolution of Parliament and a general election. A biographer of Campbell-Bannerman, A. J. A. Morris, later suggested that Balfour was motivated in this unusual step by the vain hope that minority government would open up the many divisions within the Liberal party. King Edward VII invited Campbell-Bannerman to form a minority government. Asquith and his close political allies Haldane and Sir Edward Grey tried to pressure him into taking a peerage to become a figurehead prime minister in the House of Lords, giving the pro-empire wing of the party greater dominance in the House of Commons. Campbell-Bannerman called their bluff and refused to move. Asquith was appointed Chancellor of the Exchequer. He held the post for over two years, and introduced three budgets.

A month after taking office, Campbell-Bannerman called a general election, in which the Liberals gained a landslide majority of 124. However, Asquith's first budget, in 1906, was constrained by the annual income and expenditure plans he had inherited from his predecessor Austen Chamberlain. The only income for which Chamberlain had over-budgeted was the duty from sales of alcohol. (Note: Jenkins, with a reference to Asquith's own reputation in that sphere, comments that Asquith did his personal best to reverse the downward trend in alcohol sales.) With a balanced budget, and a realistic assessment of future public expenditure, Asquith was able, in his second and third budgets, to lay the foundations for limited redistribution of wealth and welfare provisions for the poor. Blocked at first by Treasury officials from setting a variable rate of income tax with higher rates on those with high incomes, he set up a committee under Sir Charles Dilke which recommended not only variable income tax rates but also a supertax on incomes of more than £5,000 a year. Asquith also introduced a distinction between earned and unearned income, taxing the latter at a higher rate. He used the increased revenues to fund old-age pensions, the first time a British government had provided them. Reductions in selective taxes, such as that on sugar, were aimed at benefiting the poor.

Asquith planned the 1908 budget, but by the time he presented it to the Commons he was no longer chancellor. Campbell-Bannerman's health had been failing for nearly a year. After a series of heart attacks, Campbell-Bannerman resigned on 3 April 1908, less than three weeks before his death. Asquith was universally accepted as the natural successor. King Edward, who was on holiday in Biarritz, sent for Asquith, who took the boat train to France and kissed hands as prime minister in the Hôtel du Palais, Biarritz, on 8 April.

== Peacetime prime minister: 1908–1914 ==
=== Appointments and cabinet ===
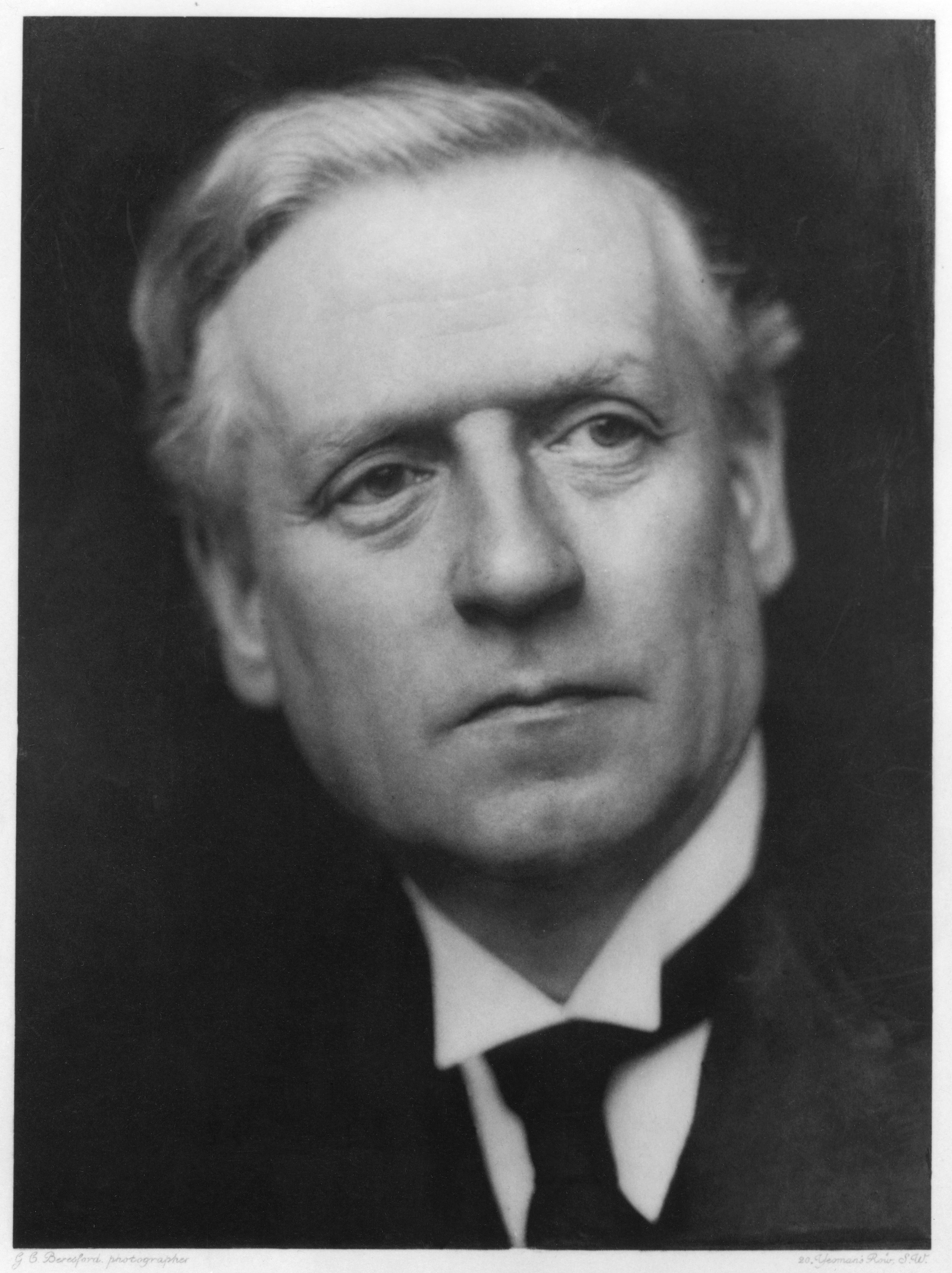
Asquith in 1908

On Asquith's return from Biarritz, his leadership of the Liberals was affirmed by a party meeting (the first time this had been done for a prime minister). He initiated a cabinet reshuffle. Lloyd George was promoted to be Asquith's replacement as chancellor. Winston Churchill succeeded Lloyd George as President of the Board of Trade, entering the Cabinet despite his youth (aged 33) and the fact that he had crossed the floor to become a Liberal only four years previously.

Asquith demoted or dismissed a number of Campbell-Bannerman's cabinet ministers. Lord Tweedmouth, the First Lord of the Admiralty, was relegated to the nominal post of Lord President of the Council. Lord Elgin was sacked from the Colonial Office and the Earl of Portsmouth (whom Asquith had tutored) was too, as undersecretary at the War Office. The abruptness of their dismissals caused hard feelings; Elgin wrote to Tweedmouth, "I venture to think that even a prime minister may have some regard for the usages common among gentlemen ... I feel that even a housemaid gets a better warning." (Note: Notice before one's employment is terminated)

Historian Cameron Hazlehurst wrote that "the new men, with the old, made a powerful team". The cabinet choices balanced the competing factions in the party; the appointments of Lloyd George and Churchill satisfied the radicals, while the Whiggish element favoured Reginald McKenna's appointment as First Lord.

=== Prime minister at leisure ===
Possessed of "a faculty for working quickly", Asquith had considerable time for leisure. Reading the classics, poetry and a vast range of English literature consumed much of his time. So did correspondence; intensely disliking the telephone, Asquith was a prolific letter writer. Travelling, often to country houses owned by members of Margot's family, was almost constant, Asquith being a devoted "weekender". He spent part of each summer in Scotland, with golf, constituency matters, and time at Balmoral as duty minister. He and Margot divided their time between Downing Street and The Wharf, a country house at Sutton Courtenay in Berkshire which they bought in 1912; their London mansion, 20 Cavendish Square, was let during his premiership. He was addicted to Contract bridge.

Above all else, Asquith thrived on company and conversation. A clubbable man, he enjoyed "the companionship of clever and attractive women" even more. Throughout his life, Asquith had a circle of close female friends, which Margot termed his "harem". In 1912 one of these, Venetia Stanley, became much closer. Meeting first in 1909–1910, by 1912 she was Asquith's constant correspondent and companion. Between that point and 1915, he wrote her some 560 letters, at a rate of up to four a day. Although it remains uncertain whether or not they were lovers, she became of central importance to him. Asquith's thorough enjoyment of "comfort and luxury" during peacetime, and his unwillingness to adjust his behaviour during conflict, ultimately contributed to the impression of a man out of touch. Helen Maud Holt's teasing question, asked at the height of the conflict, "Tell me, Mr Asquith, do you take an interest in the war?", conveyed a commonly held view.

Asquith enjoyed alcohol and his drinking was the subject of considerable gossip. His relaxed attitude to drink disappointed the temperance element in the Liberal coalition and some authors have suggested it affected his decision-making, for example in his opposition to Lloyd George's wartime attacks on the liquor trade. The Conservative leader Bonar Law quipped "Asquith drunk can make a better speech than any of us sober". His reputation suffered, especially as wartime crises demanded the full attention of the prime minister. David Owen writes that Asquith was ordered by his doctor to rein in his consumption after a near-collapse in April 1911, but it is unclear whether he actually did so. Owen, a medical doctor by training, states that "by modern diagnostic standards, Asquith became an alcoholic while Prime Minister." Witnesses often remarked on his weight gain and red, bloated face.

=== Domestic policy ===
==== Reforming the House of Lords ====
Asquith hoped to act as a mediator between members of his cabinet as they pushed Liberal legislation through Parliament. Events, including conflict with the House of Lords, forced him to the front from the start of his premiership. Despite the Liberals' massive majority in the House of Commons, the Conservatives had overwhelming support in the unelected upper chamber. The imbalance in the Upper House had been caused by the Liberal split over the First Home Rule Bill in 1886, in which many Liberal peers had become Liberal Unionists, who by this time had almost merged with the Conservatives. As had happened in the Liberal Governments of 1892–1895, a number of bills were voted down by the Conservative-dominated House of Lords during Campbell-Bannerman's premiership. Although the Lords passed the Trade Disputes Act 1906 (6 Edw. 7. c. 47), the Workmen's Compensation Act 1906 (6 Edw. 7. c. 58) and the Coal Mines Regulation Act 1908 (8 Edw. 7. c. 57), they rejected the Education Bill of 1906, an important measure in the eyes of Liberal nonconformist voters. Campbell-Bannerman had favoured reforming the Lords by providing that a bill thrice passed by the Commons at least six months apart could become law without the Lords' consent, while diminishing the power of the Commons by reducing the maximum term of a parliament from seven to five years. Asquith, as chancellor, had served on a cabinet committee that had written a plan to resolve legislative stalemates by a joint sitting of the Commons as a body with 100 of the peers. The Commons passed a number of pieces of legislation in 1908 which were defeated or heavily amended in the Lords, including a Licensing Bill, a Scottish Small Landholders' Bill, and a Scottish Land Values Bill.

None of these bills was important enough to dissolve parliament and seek a new mandate at a general election. Asquith and Lloyd George believed the peers would back down if presented with Liberal objectives contained within a finance bill—the Lords had not obstructed a money bill since the 17th century and, after initially blocking Gladstone's attempt (as chancellor) to repeal Paper Duties, had yielded in 1861 when it was submitted again in a finance bill. Accordingly, the Liberal leadership expected that after much objection from the Conservative peers, the Lords would yield to policy changes wrapped within a budget bill.

==== 1909: People's Budget ====
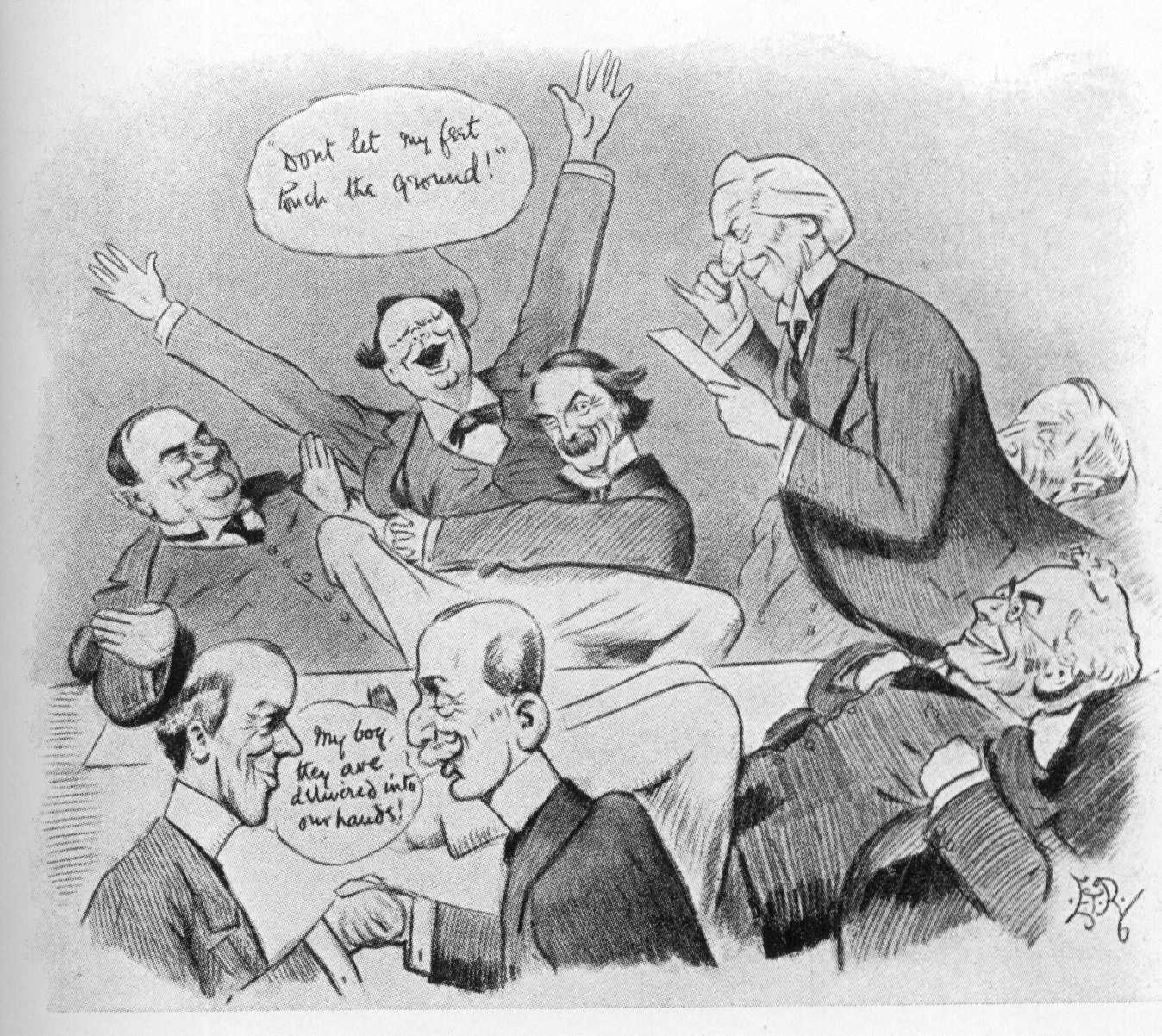
This 1909 Punch cartoon suggests the Liberals were delighted when the Lords forced an election. Back row: Haldane, Churchill with arms up, being hugged by his ally Lloyd George. Asquith standing at right. Bottom row: McKenna, Lord Crewe (with moustache), Augustine Birrell leaning back

In a major speech in December 1908, Asquith announced that the upcoming budget would reflect the Liberals' policy agenda, and the People's Budget that was submitted to Parliament by Lloyd George the following year greatly expanded social welfare programmes. To pay for them, it significantly increased both direct and indirect taxes. These included a 20 per cent tax on the unearned increase in value in land, payable at death of the owner or sale of the land. There would also be a tax of 1/2d in the pound (Note: That is, half a penny in a pound at a time (until 1971) when the pound sterling was made up of 240 pence, thus the tax was 1/480 of the land's value, annually.) on undeveloped land. A graduated income tax was imposed, and there were increases in imposts on tobacco, beer and spirits. A tax on petrol was introduced despite Treasury concerns that it could not work in practice. Although Asquith held fourteen cabinet meetings to assure unity amongst his ministers, there was opposition from some Liberals; Rosebery described the budget as "inquisitorial, tyrannical, and Socialistic".

The budget divided the country and provoked bitter debate through the summer of 1909. The Northcliffe Press (The Times and the Daily Mail) urged rejection of the budget to give tariff reform (indirect taxes on imported goods which, it was felt, would encourage British industry and trade within the Empire) a chance; there were many public meetings, some of them organised by dukes, in protest at the budget. Many Liberal politicians attacked the peers, including Lloyd George in his Newcastle upon Tyne speech, in which he said "a fully-equipped duke costs as much to keep up as two Dreadnoughts; and dukes are just as great a terror and they last longer". King Edward privately urged the Conservative leaders Balfour and Lord Lansdowne to pass the Budget (this was not unusual, as Queen Victoria had helped to broker agreement between the two Houses over the Irish Church Act 1869 and the Third Reform Act in 1884).

From July it became increasingly clear that the Conservative peers would reject the budget, partly in the hope of forcing an election. If they rejected it, Asquith determined, he would have to ask the King to dissolve Parliament, four years into a seven-year term, as it would mean the legislature had refused supply. (Note: Asquith had to apologise to the King's adviser Lord Knollys for a Churchill speech calling for a Dissolution and rebuked Churchill at a Cabinet Meeting (21 July 1909) telling him to keep out of "matters of high policy", as the monarch's permission was needed to dissolve Parliament prematurely. See Magnus 1964, p. 527) The budget passed the Commons on 4 November 1909, but was voted down in the Lords on the 30th, the Lords passing a resolution by Lord Lansdowne stating that they were entitled to oppose the finance bill as it lacked an electoral mandate. Asquith had Parliament prorogued three days later for an election beginning on 15 January 1910, with the Commons first passing a resolution deeming the Lords' vote to be an attack on the constitution.

==== 1910: election and constitutional deadlock ====
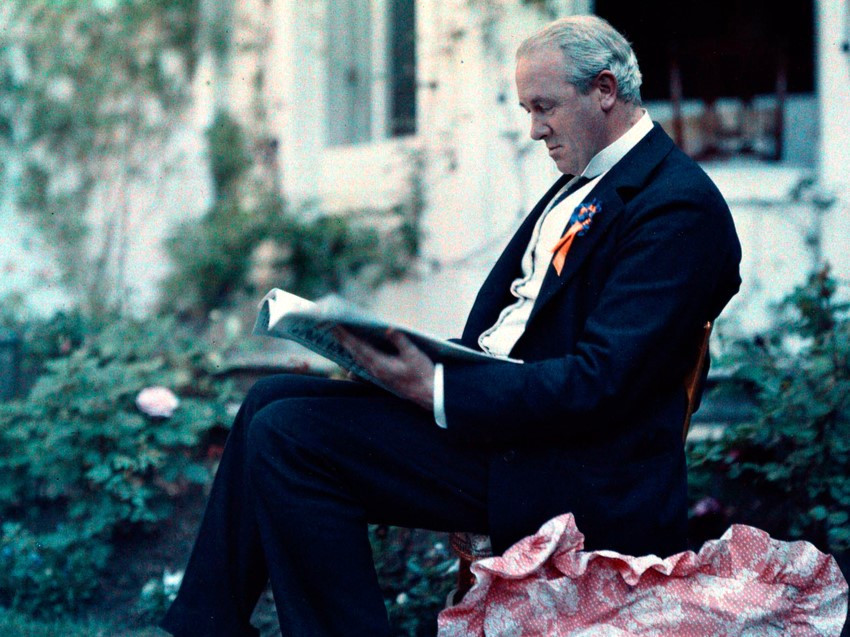
Asquith in an Autochrome by Lionel de Rothschild, c. 1910

The January 1910 general election was dominated by talk of removing the Lords' veto. A possible solution was to threaten to have King Edward pack the House of Lords with freshly minted Liberal peers, who would override the Lords's veto; Asquith's talk of safeguards was taken by many to mean that he had secured the King's agreement to this. They were mistaken; the King had informed Asquith that he would not consider a mass creation of peers until after a second general election.

Lloyd George and Churchill were the leading forces in the Liberals' appeal to the voters; Asquith, clearly tired, took to the hustings for a total of two weeks during the campaign, and when the polls began, journeyed to Cannes with such speed that he neglected an engagement with the King, to the monarch's annoyance. The result was a hung parliament. The Liberals lost heavily from their great majority of 1906, but still finished with two more seats than the Conservatives. With Irish Nationalist and Labour support, the government would have ample support on most issues, and Asquith stated that his majority compared favourably with those enjoyed by Lord Palmerston and Lord John Russell.

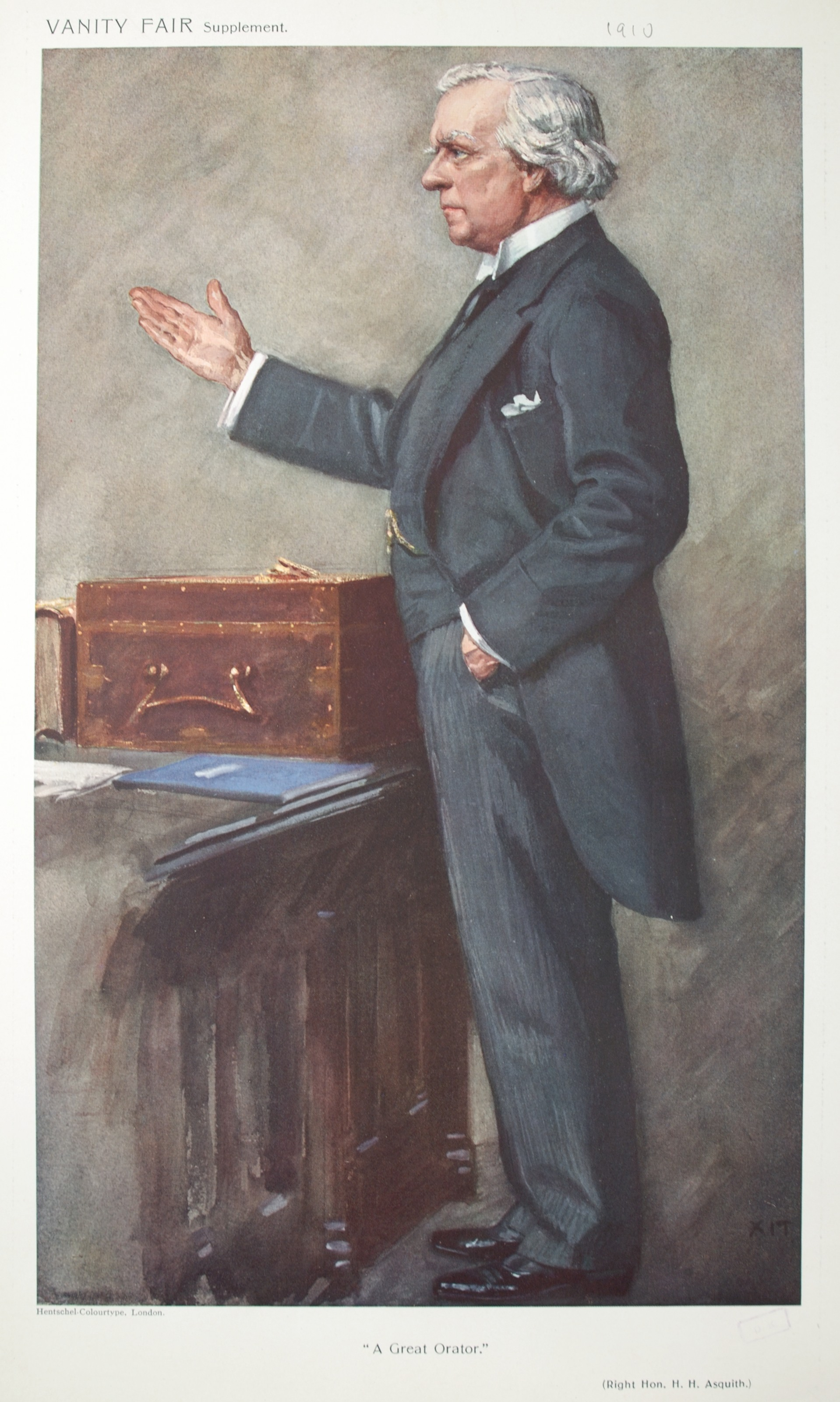
Asquith caricatured in Vanity Fair, 1910

Immediate further pressure to remove the Lords' veto now came from the Irish MPs, who wanted to remove the Lords' ability to block the introduction of Irish Home Rule. They threatened to vote against the Budget unless they had their way. (Note: Irish nationalists, unlike Liberals, favoured tariff reform, and opposed the planned increase in whisky duty, but an attempt by Lloyd George to win their support by cancelling it was abandoned as the Cabinet felt that this was recasting the Budget too much, and because it would also have annoyed nonconformist voters. See Magnus 1964, pp. 548, 553) With another general election likely before long, Asquith had to make clear the Liberal policy on constitutional change to the country without alienating the Irish and Labour. This initially proved difficult, and the King's speech opening Parliament was vague on what was to be done to neutralise the Lords' veto. Asquith dispirited his supporters by stating in Parliament that he had neither asked for nor received a commitment from the King to create peers. The cabinet considered resigning and leaving it up to Balfour to try to form a Conservative government.

The budget passed the Commons again, and this time was approved by the Lords in April without a division. The cabinet finally decided to back a plan based on Campbell-Bannerman's, that a bill passed by the Commons in three consecutive annual sessions would become law notwithstanding the Lords' objections. Unless the King guaranteed that he would create enough Liberal peers to pass the bill, ministers would resign and allow Balfour to form a government, leaving the matter to be debated at the ensuing general election. On 14 April 1910, the Commons passed resolutions that would become the basis of the eventual Parliament Act 1911: to remove the power of the Lords to veto money bills, to reduce blocking of other bills to a two-year power of delay, and also to reduce the term of a parliament from seven years to five. In that debate Asquith also hinted—in part to ensure the support of the Irish MPs—that he would ask the King to break the deadlock "in that Parliament" (i.e. that he would ask for the mass creation of peers, contrary to the King's earlier stipulation that there be a second election). By April the King was being advised by Balfour and the Archbishop of Canterbury (to whom he had turned for relatively neutral constitutional advice) that the Liberals did not have sufficient electoral mandate to demand creation of peers. King Edward thought the whole proposal "simply disgusting" and that the government was "in the hands of Redmond & Co". Lord Crewe, Liberal leader in the Lords, announced publicly that the government's wish to create peers should be treated as formal "ministerial advice" (which, by convention, the monarch must obey) although Lord Esher argued that the monarch was entitled in extremis to dismiss the Government rather than take their "advice".

Either way, these plans were somewhat scuppered by the death of Edward VII on 6 May 1910. Asquith and his ministers were initially reluctant to press the new king, George V, in mourning for his father, for commitments on constitutional change, and the monarch's views were not yet known. With a strong feeling in the country that the parties should compromise, Asquith and other Liberals met with Conservative leaders in a number of conferences through much of the remainder of 1910. These talks failed in November over Conservative insistence that there be no limits on the Lords's ability to veto Irish Home Rule. When the Parliament Bill was submitted to the Lords, they made amendments that were not acceptable to the government.

==== 1910–1911: second election and Parliament Act ====
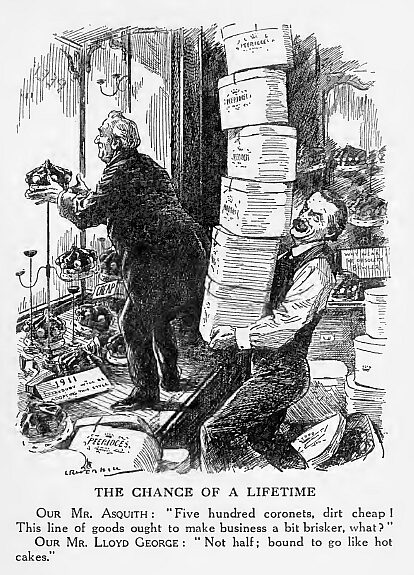
Punch 1911 cartoon shows Asquith and Lloyd George preparing coronets for 500 new peers

On 11 November Asquith asked King George to dissolve Parliament for another general election in December, and on 14 November met again with the King and demanded assurances George would create an adequate number of Liberal peers to carry the Parliament Bill. The King was slow to agree, and Asquith and his Cabinet informed him they would resign if he did not make the commitment. Balfour had told Edward that he would form a Conservative government if the Liberals left office, but the new King did not know this. The King reluctantly gave in to Asquith's demand, writing in his diary that, "I disliked having to do this very much, but agreed that this was the only alternative to the Cabinet resigning, which at this moment would be disastrous".

Asquith dominated the short election campaign, focusing on the Lords' veto in calm speeches, compared by his biographer Stephen Koss to the "wild irresponsibility" of other major campaigners. In a speech at Hull, he stated that the Liberals' purpose was to remove the obstruction, not establish an ideal upper house, "I have always got to deal—the country has got to deal—with things here and now. We need an instrument [of constitutional change] that can be set to work at once, which will get rid of deadlocks, and give us the fair and even chance in legislation to which we are entitled, and which is all that we demand."

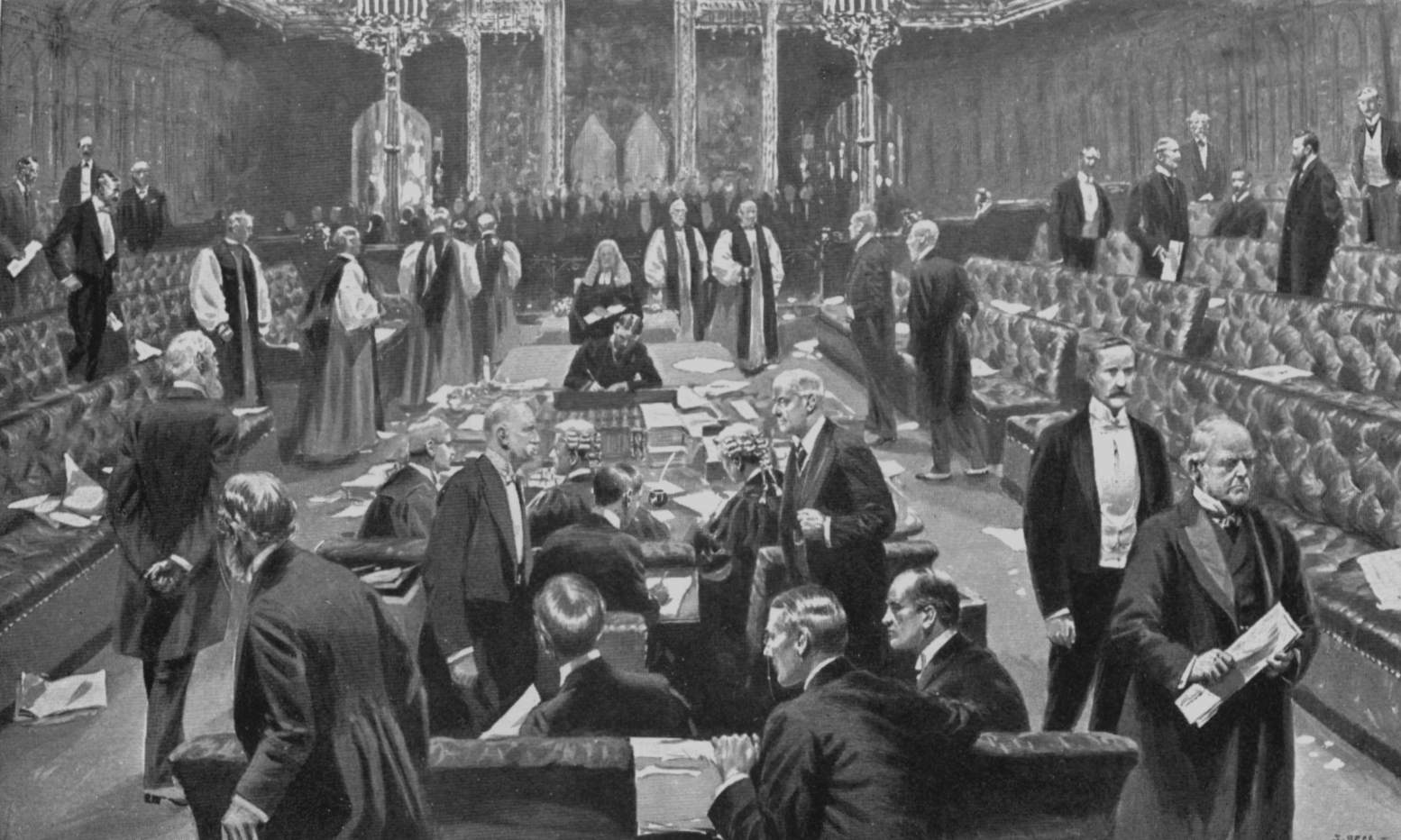
Samuel Begg's depiction of the passing of the Parliament Bill in the House of Lords, 1911

The election resulted in little change to the party strengths (the Liberal and Conservative parties were exactly equal in size; by 1914 the Conservative Party would actually be larger owing to by-election victories). Nevertheless, Asquith remained prime minister, with a large majority in the Commons on the issue of the House of Lords. The Parliament Bill again passed the House of Commons in April 1911, and was heavily amended in the Lords. Asquith advised King George that the monarch would be called upon to create the peers, and the King agreed, asking that his pledge be made public, and that the Lords be allowed to reconsider their opposition. Once it was, there was a raging internal debate within the Conservatives on whether to give in, or to continue to vote no even when outnumbered by hundreds of newly created peers. After lengthy debate, on 10 August 1911 the Lords voted narrowly not to insist on their amendments, with many Conservative peers abstaining and a few voting in favour of the government; the bill was passed into law.

According to Jenkins, although Asquith had at times moved slowly during the crisis, "on the whole, Asquith's slow moulding of events had amounted to a masterly display of political nerve and patient determination. Compared with [the Conservatives], his leadership was outstanding." Churchill wrote to Asquith after the second 1910 election, "your leadership was the main and conspicuous feature of the whole fight". Matthew, in his article on Asquith, found that, "the episode was the zenith of Asquith's prime ministerial career. In the British Liberal tradition, he patched rather than reformulated the constitution."

==== Social, religious and labour matters ====
Despite the distraction of the problem of the House of Lords, Asquith and his government moved ahead with a number of pieces of reforming legislation. According to Matthew, "no peacetime premier has been a more effective enabler. Labour exchanges, the introduction of unemployment and health insurance ... reflected the reforms the government was able to achieve despite the problem of the Lords. Asquith was not himself a 'new Liberal', but he saw the need for a change in assumptions about the individual's relationship to the state, and he was fully aware of the political risk to the Liberals of a Labour Party on its left flank." Keen to keep the support of the Labour Party, the Asquith government passed bills urged by that party, including the Trade Union Act 1913 (reversing the Osborne judgment) and in 1911 granting MPs a salary, making it more feasible for working-class people to serve in the House of Commons.

In 1911 there were fears of a potential miner's strike immediately following a railwaymen's strike in August. In February 1912 the executives of the Miners' Federation voted in favour of a strike. Asquith, alongside Lloyd George, Buxton and Grey, met the executives at the Foreign Office, where he accepted the principle of a minimum wage but rejected the 5 and 2 demand. As threatened, the strike began. Following the failure of attempts by the cabinet to compromise, the government resorted to emergency legislation. In March, the Miner's Minimum Wage Bill was passed through the Commons and the Lords, adhering to its policy of not opposing trade unions, approved the measure. Asquith emotionally presented the Bill for its third reading, saying "we have exhausted all our powers of persuasion and argument and negotiation." The bill was passed and the new Coal Mines (Minimum Wage) Act 1912 established district boards to determine minimum wages with trade union representation. In April, a union vote failed to secure a two-thirds majority for continuation, and miners returned to work.

Asquith had as chancellor placed money aside for the provision of non-contributory old-age pensions; the bill authorising them passed in 1908, during his premiership, despite some objection in the Lords. Jenkins noted that the scheme (which provided five shillings a week to single pensioners aged seventy and over, and slightly less than twice that to married couples) "to modern ears sounds cautious and meagre. But it was violently criticised at the time for showing a reckless generosity." In 1913, a committee was established to develop a land reform scheme. The committee produced a comprehensive report on rural land issues and its proposals were largely accepted by government ministers and formed the foundation of Lloyd George's "Land Campaign". In August 1913, following the prorogation of Parliament, the final proposals were presented to Asquith at a ministerial gathering at Haldane's house. Asquith ultimately approved them, including the introduction of a minimum wage for agricultural labourers, despite previously being reluctant on the issue.

The Children Act 1908 consolidated multiple previous laws to improve child welfare. It established juvenile courts, remand homes, and prohibited placing children under 16 in adult prisons. The act also aimed to enhance parental responsibility and state involvement in child welfare. Asquith's government also passed the National Insurance Act 1911 which established health and unemployment insurance for certain groups of workers. Asquith described the insurance scheme to the King as "the largest and most beneficial increase in social reform yet achieved in any country." The National Insurance Act was "...the kingpin of the social policy of a Liberal government."

Asquith's new government became embroiled in a controversy over the Eucharistic Congress of 1908, held in London. Following the Roman Catholic Relief Act 1829, the Catholic Church had seen a resurgence in Britain, and a large procession displaying the Blessed Sacrament was planned to allow the laity to participate. Although such an event was forbidden by the 1829 act, planners counted on the British reputation for religious tolerance, and Francis Cardinal Bourne, the Archbishop of Westminster, had obtained permission from the Metropolitan Police. When the plans became widely known, King Edward objected, as did many other Protestants. Asquith received inconsistent advice from his Home Secretary, Herbert Gladstone, and successfully pressed the organisers to cancel the religious aspects of the procession, although it cost him the resignation of his only Catholic cabinet minister, Lord Ripon.

Disestablishment of the Welsh Church was a Liberal priority, but despite support by most Welsh MPs, there was opposition in the Lords. Asquith was an authority on Welsh disestablishment from his time under Gladstone, but had little to do with the passage of the bill. It was twice rejected by the Lords, in 1912 and 1913, but having been forced through under the Parliament Act 1911 received royal assent as the Welsh Church Act 1914 in September 1914, with the provisions suspended by the Suspensory Act 1914 until war's end.

==== Votes for women ====
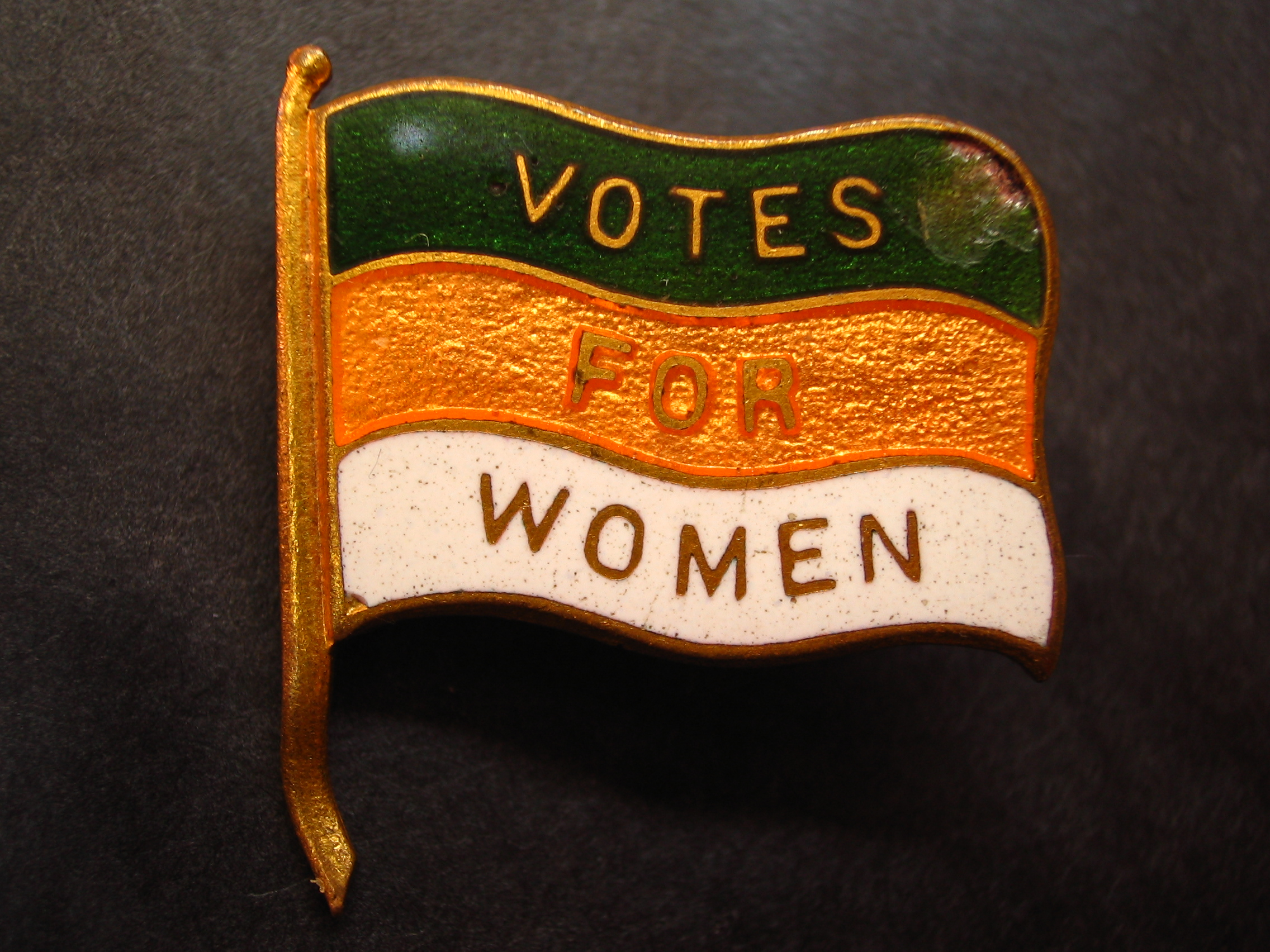
Early 20th century suffragist lapel pin

Asquith had opposed votes for women as early as 1882, and he remained well known as an adversary throughout his time as prime minister. He took a detached view of the women's suffrage question, believing it should be judged on whether extending the franchise would improve the system of government, rather than as a question of rights. He did not understand—Jenkins ascribed it to a failure of imagination—why passions were raised on both sides over the issue. He told the House of Commons in 1913, while complaining of the "exaggerated language" on both sides, "I am sometimes tempted to think, as one listens to the arguments of supporters of women's suffrage, that there is nothing to be said for it, and I am sometimes tempted to think, as I listen to the arguments of the opponents of women's suffrage, that there is nothing to be said against it."

In 1906 the suffragettes Annie Kenney, Adelaide Knight and Jane Sbarborough were arrested when they tried to obtain an audience with Asquith. Offered either six weeks in prison or giving up campaigning for one year, the women all chose prison. Asquith was a target for militant suffragettes as they abandoned hope of achieving the vote through peaceful means. He was several times the subject of their tactics: approached (to his annoyance) arriving at 10 Downing Street (by Olive Fargus and Catherine Corbett, whom he called 'silly women'), confronted at evening parties, accosted on the golf course, and ambushed while driving to Stirling to dedicate a memorial to Campbell-Bannerman. On the last occasion, his top hat proved adequate protection against the dog whips wielded by the women. These incidents left him unmoved, as he did not believe them a true manifestation of public opinion.

With a growing majority of the Cabinet, including Lloyd George and Churchill, in favour of women's suffrage, Asquith was pressed to allow consideration of a private member's bill to give women the vote. The majority of Liberal MPs were also in favour. Jenkins deemed him one of the two main prewar obstacles to women gaining the vote, the other being the suffragists's own militancy. In 1912, Asquith reluctantly agreed to permit a free vote on an amendment to a pending reform bill, allowing women the vote on the same terms as men. This would have satisfied Liberal suffrage supporters, and many suffragists, but the Speaker in January 1913 ruled that the amendment changed the nature of the bill, which would have to be withdrawn. Asquith was loud in his complaints against the Speaker, but was privately relieved.

Asquith belatedly came around to support women's suffrage in 1917, by which time he was out of office. Women over the age of thirty were eventually given the vote by Lloyd George's government under the Representation of the People Act 1918. Asquith's reforms to the House of Lords eased the way for the passage of the bill.

=== Irish Home Rule ===
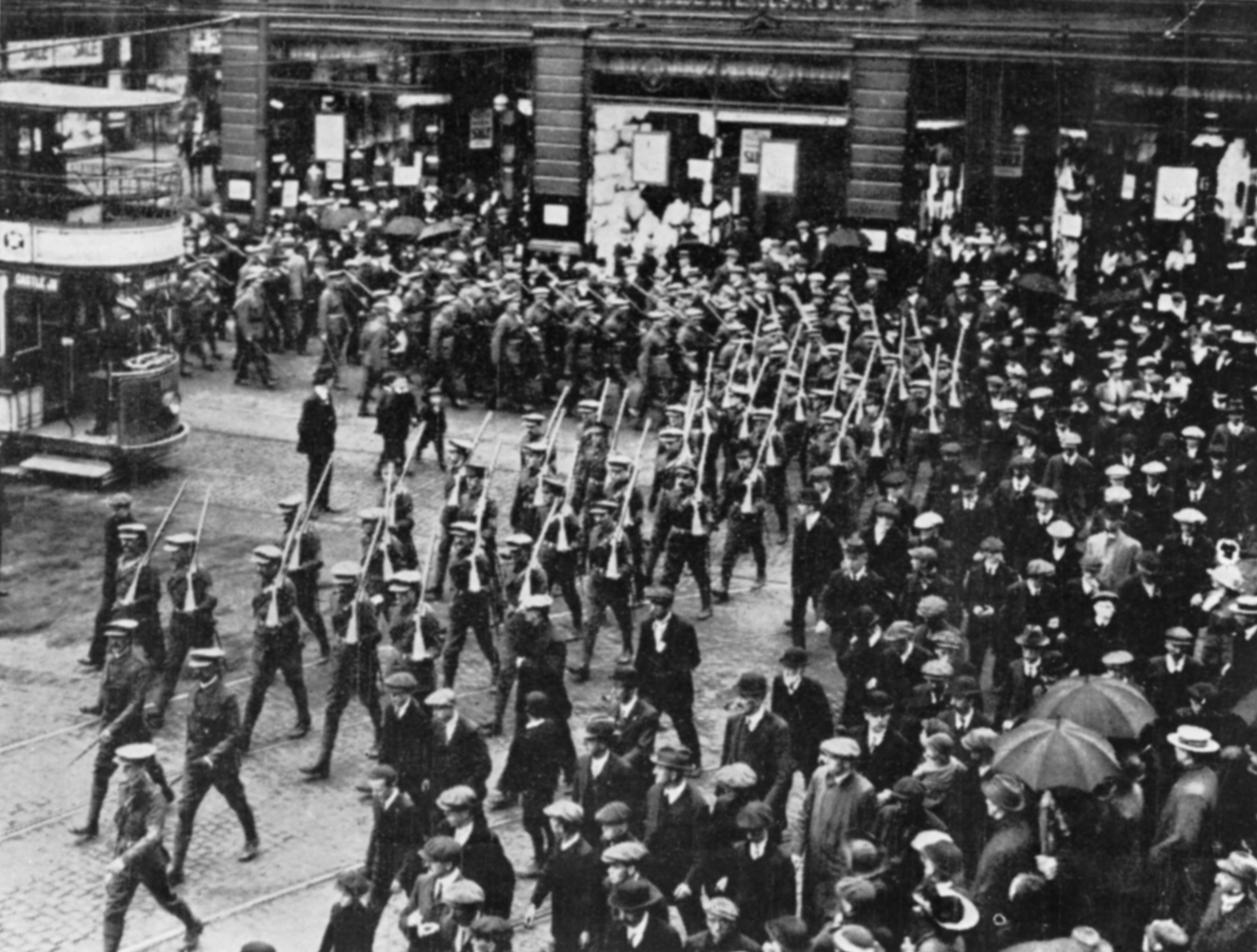
Members of the Ulster Volunteer Force march through Belfast, 1914

As a minority party after 1910 elections, the Liberals depended on the Irish vote, controlled by John Redmond. To gain Irish support for the budget and the parliament bill, Asquith promised Redmond that Irish Home Rule would be the highest priority. It proved much more complex and time-consuming than expected. Support for self-government for Ireland had been a tenet of the Liberal Party since 1886, but Asquith had not been as enthusiastic, stating in 1903 (while in opposition) that the party should never take office if that government would be dependent for survival on the support of the Irish Nationalist Party. After 1910, though, Irish Nationalist votes were essential to stay in power. Retaining Ireland in the Union was the declared intent of all parties, and the Nationalists, as part of the majority that kept Asquith in office, were entitled to seek enactment of their plans for Home Rule, and to expect Liberal and Labour support. The Conservatives, with die-hard support from the Protestant Orangemen of Ulster, were strongly opposed to Home Rule. The desire to retain a veto for the Lords on such bills had been an unbridgeable gap between the parties in the constitutional talks prior to the second 1910 election.

The cabinet committee (not including Asquith) that in 1911 planned the Third Home Rule Bill opposed any special status for Protestant Ulster within majority-Catholic Ireland. Asquith later (in 1913) wrote to Churchill, stating that the Prime Minister had always believed and stated that the price of Home Rule should be a special status for Ulster. In spite of this, the bill as introduced in April 1912 contained no such provision, and was meant to apply to all Ireland. Neither partition nor a special status for Ulster was likely to satisfy either side. The self-government offered by the bill was very limited, but Irish Nationalists, expecting Home Rule to come by gradual parliamentary steps, favoured it. The Conservatives and Irish Unionists opposed it. Unionists began preparing to get their way by force if necessary, prompting nationalist emulation. Though very much a minority, Irish Unionists were generally better financed and more organised.

Since the Parliament Act 1911 the Unionists could no longer block Home Rule in the House of Lords, but only delay royal assent by two years. Asquith decided to postpone any concessions to the Unionists until the bill's third passage through the Commons, when he believed the Unionists would be desperate for a compromise. Jenkins concluded that had Asquith tried for an earlier agreement, he would have had no luck, as many of his opponents wanted a fight and the opportunity to smash his government. Sir Edward Carson, MP for Dublin University and leader of the Irish Unionists in Parliament, threatened a revolt if Home Rule was enacted. The new Conservative leader, Bonar Law, campaigned in Parliament and in northern Ireland, warning Ulstermen against "Rome Rule", that is, domination by the island's Catholic majority. Many who opposed Home Rule felt that the Liberals had violated the Constitution—by pushing through major constitutional change without a clear electoral mandate, with the House of Lords, formerly the "watchdog of the constitution", not reformed as had been promised in the preamble of the Parliament Act 1911—and thus justified actions that in other circumstances might be treason.

The passions generated by the Irish question contrasted with Asquith's cool detachment, and he wrote about the prospective partition of County Tyrone, which had a mixed population, deeming it "an impasse, with unspeakable consequences, upon a matter which to English eyes seems inconceivably small, & to Irish eyes immeasurably big". In 1912 Asquith said: "Ireland is a nation, not two nations but one nation. There are few cases in history, ...of nationality at once so distinct, so persistent and so assimilative as the Irish." As the Commons debated the Home Rule bill in late 1912 and early 1913, unionists in the north of Ireland mobilised, with talk of Carson declaring a Provisional Government and Ulster Volunteer Forces (UVF) built around the Orange Lodges, but in the cabinet, only Churchill viewed this with alarm. These forces, insisting on their loyalty to the British Crown but increasingly well-armed with smuggled German weapons, prepared to do battle with the British Army, but Unionist leaders were confident that the army would not aid in forcing Home Rule on Ulster. As the Home Rule bill awaited its third passage through the Commons, the Curragh incident occurred in April 1914. With deployment of troops into Ulster imminent and threatening language by Churchill and the Secretary of State for War, John Seely, around sixty army officers, led by Brigadier-General Hubert Gough, announced that they would rather be dismissed from the service than obey. With unrest spreading to army officers in England, the Cabinet acted to placate the officers with a statement written by Asquith reiterating the duty of officers to obey lawful orders but claiming that the incident had been a misunderstanding. Seely then added an unauthorised assurance, countersigned by Sir John French (the professional head of the army), that the government had no intention of using force against Ulster. Asquith repudiated the addition, and required Seely and French to resign, taking on the War Office himself, retaining the additional responsibility until hostilities against Germany began.

Within a month of the start of Asquith's tenure at the War Office, the UVF landed a large cargo of guns and ammunition at Larne, but the Cabinet did not deem it prudent to arrest their leaders. On 12 May, Asquith announced that he would secure Home Rule's third passage through the Commons (accomplished on 25 May), but that there would be an amending bill with it, making special provision for Ulster. But the Lords made changes to the amending bill unacceptable to Asquith, and with no way to invoke the Parliament Act 1911 on the amending bill, Asquith agreed to meet other leaders at an all-party conference on 21 July at Buckingham Palace, chaired by the King. When no solution could be found, Asquith and his cabinet planned further concessions to the Unionists, but this did not occur as the crisis on the Continent erupted into war. In September 1914, after the outbreak of the conflict, Asquith announced that the Home Rule bill would go on the statute book (as the Government of Ireland Act 1914) but would not go into force until after the war (see Suspensory Act 1914); in the interim a bill granting special status to Ulster would be considered. This solution satisfied neither side.

=== Foreign and defence policy ===
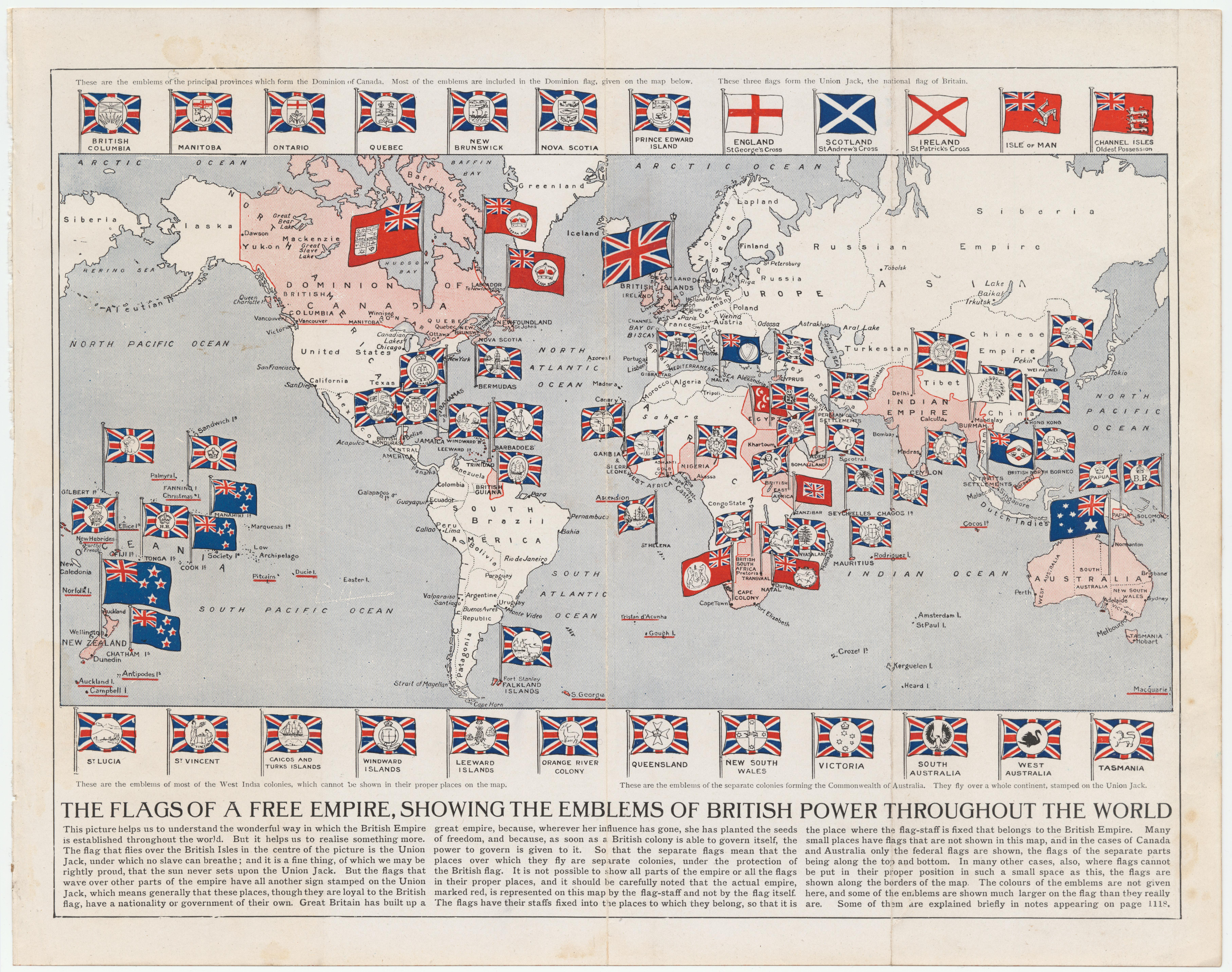
The British Empire in 1910

Asquith led a deeply divided Liberal Party as prime minister, not least on questions of foreign relations and defence spending. Under Balfour, Britain and France had agreed upon the Entente Cordiale. In 1906, at the time the Liberals took office, there was an ongoing crisis between France and Germany over Morocco, and the French asked for British help in the event of conflict. Grey, the Foreign Secretary, refused any formal arrangement, but gave it as his personal opinion that in the event of war Britain would aid France. France then asked for military conversations aimed at co-ordination in such an event. Grey agreed, and these went on in the following years, without cabinet knowledge—Asquith most likely did not know of them until 1911. When he learnt of them, Asquith was concerned that the French took for granted British aid in the event of war, but Grey persuaded him the talks must continue.

More public was the naval arms race between Britain and Germany. The Moroccan crisis had been settled at the Algeciras Conference, and Campbell-Bannerman's cabinet approved reduced naval estimates. Tenser relationships with Germany, and that nation moving ahead with its own dreadnoughts, led Reginald McKenna, when Asquith appointed him First Lord of the Admiralty in 1908, to propose the laying down of eight more British ones in the following three years. This prompted conflict in the Cabinet between those who supported this programme, such as McKenna, and the "economists" who promoted economy in naval estimates, led by Lloyd George and Churchill. There was much public sentiment for building as many ships as possible to maintain British naval superiority. Asquith mediated among his colleagues and secured a compromise whereby four ships would be laid down at once, and four more if there proved to be a need. The armaments matter was put to the side during the domestic crises over the 1909 budget and then the Parliament Act, though the building of warships continued at an accelerated rate.

The Agadir Crisis of 1911 was again between France and Germany over Moroccan interests, but Asquith's government signalled its friendliness towards France in Lloyd George's Mansion House speech on 21 July. Late that year, the Lord President of the Council, Viscount Morley, brought the question of the communications with the French to the attention of the Cabinet. The Cabinet agreed (at Asquith's instigation) that no talks could be held that committed Britain to war, and required cabinet approval for co-ordinated military actions. Nevertheless, by 1912, the French had requested additional naval co-ordination and late in the year, the various understandings were committed to writing in an exchange of letters between Grey and French Ambassador Paul Cambon. The relationship with France disquieted some Liberal backbenchers and Asquith felt obliged to assure them that nothing had been secretly agreed that would commit Britain to war. This quieted Asquith's foreign policy critics until another naval estimates dispute erupted early in 1914.

=== July Crisis and outbreak of the First World War ===
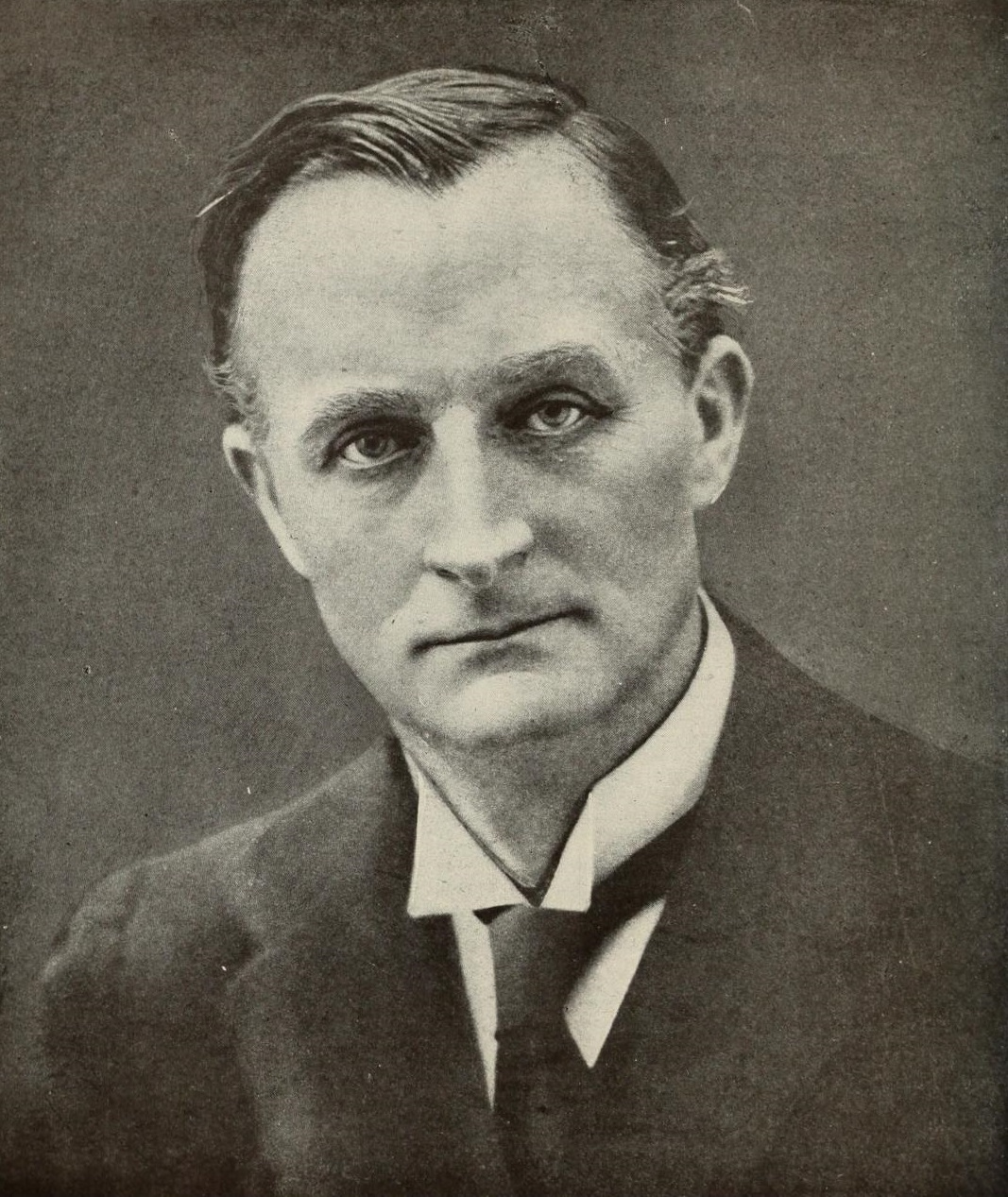
Sir Edward Grey

The assassination of Archduke Franz Ferdinand of Austria in Sarajevo on 28 June 1914 initiated a month of unsuccessful diplomatic attempts to avoid war. These attempts ended with Grey's proposal for a four-power conference of Britain, Germany, France and Italy, following the Austrian ultimatum to Serbia on the evening of 23 July. Grey's initiative was rejected by Germany as "not practicable". During this period, George Cassar considers that "the country was overwhelmingly opposed to intervention." Much of Asquith's cabinet was similarly inclined, Lloyd George told a journalist on 27 July that "there could be no question of our taking part in any war in the first instance. He knew of no Minister who would be in favour of it." and wrote in his War Memoirs that before the German ultimatum to Belgium on 3 August "The Cabinet was hopelessly divided—fully one third, if not one half, being opposed to our entry into the War. After the German ultimatum to Belgium the Cabinet was almost unanimous." Asquith himself, while growing more aware of the impending catastrophe, was still uncertain of the necessity for Britain's involvement. On 24 July he wrote to Venetia, "We are within measurable, or imaginable, distance of a real Armageddon. Happily there seems to be no reason why we should be anything more than spectators."

During the continuing escalation Asquith "used all his experience and authority to keep his options open" and adamantly refused to commit his government by saying, "The worst thing we could do would be to announce to the world at the present moment that in no circumstances would we intervene." But he recognised Grey's clear commitment to Anglo-French unity and, following Russian mobilisation on 30 July, and Kaiser Wilhelm II's ultimatum to Tsar Nicholas II on 1 August, he recognised the inevitability of war. From this point, he committed himself to participation, despite continuing Cabinet opposition. As he said, "There is a strong party reinforced by Ll George[, ] Morley and Harcourt who are against any kind of intervention. Grey will never consent and I shall not separate myself from him." Also, on 2 August, he received confirmation of Conservative support from Bonar Law. In one of two extraordinary Cabinets held on that Sunday, Grey informed members of the 1912 Anglo-French naval talks and Asquith secured agreement to mobilise the fleet.

On Monday 3 August the Belgian Government rejected the German demand for free passage through its country and in the afternoon, "with gravity and unexpected eloquence", Grey spoke in the Commons and called for British action "against the unmeasured aggrandisement of any power". Basil Liddell Hart considered that this speech saw the "hardening (of) British opinion to the point of intervention". The following day Asquith saw the King and an ultimatum to Germany demanding withdrawal from Belgian soil was issued with a deadline of midnight Berlin time, 11.00 pm (GMT). Margot Asquith described the moment of expiry, somewhat inaccurately, in these terms: "(I joined) Henry in the Cabinet room. Lord Crewe and Grey were already there and we sat smoking cigarettes in silence ... The clock on the mantelpiece hammered out the hour and when the last beat of midnight struck it was as silent as dawn. We were at War."

== First year of the war: August 1914 – May 1915 ==
=== Asquith's wartime government ===
The declaration of war on 4 August 1914 saw Asquith as the head of an almost united Liberal Party. Having persuaded Sir John Simon and Lord Beauchamp to remain, Asquith suffered only two resignations from his cabinet, those of John Morley and John Burns. With other parties promising to co-operate, Asquith's government declared war on behalf of a united nation, Asquith bringing "the country into war without civil disturbance or political schism".

The first months of the War saw a revival in Asquith's popularity. Bitterness from earlier struggles temporarily receded and the nation looked to Asquith, "steady, massive, self-reliant and unswerving", to lead them to victory. But Asquith's peacetime strengths ill-equipped him for what was to become perhaps the first total war and, before its end, he would be out of office for ever and his party would never again form a majority government.

Beyond the replacement of Morley and Burns, Asquith made one other significant change to his cabinet. He relinquished the War Office and appointed the non-partisan but Conservative-inclined Lord Kitchener of Khartoum. Kitchener was a figure of national renown and his participation strengthened the reputation of the government. Whether it increased its effectiveness is less certain. Overall, it was a government of considerable talent with Lloyd George remaining as chancellor, Grey as foreign secretary and Churchill at the Admiralty.

The invasion of Belgium by German forces, the touch paper for British intervention, saw the Kaiser's armies attempt a lightning strike through Belgium against France, while holding Russian forces on the Eastern Front. To support the French, Asquith's cabinet authorised the despatch of the British Expeditionary Force. The ensuing Battle of the Frontiers in the late summer and early autumn of 1914 saw the final halt of the German advance at the First Battle of the Marne, which established the pattern of attritional trench warfare on the Western Front that continued until 1918. This stalemate brought deepening resentment against the government, and against Asquith personally, as the population at large and the press lords in particular, blamed him for a lack of energy in the prosecution of the war. It also created divisions within the Cabinet between the "Westerners", including Asquith, who supported the generals in believing that the key to victory lay in ever greater investment of men and munitions in France and Belgium, and the "Easterners", led by Churchill and Lloyd George, who believed that the Western Front was in a state of irreversible stasis and sought victory through action in the East. Lastly, it highlighted divisions between those politicians, and newspaper owners, who thought that military strategy and actions should be determined by the generals, and those who thought politicians should make those decisions. Asquith said in his memoirs: "Once the governing objectives have been decided by Ministers at home—the execution should always be left to the untrammeled discretion of the commanders on the spot." Lloyd George's counter view was expressed in a letter of early 1916 in which he asked "whether I have a right to express an independent view on the War or must (be) a pure advocate of opinions expressed by my military advisers?" These divergent opinions lay behind the two great crises that would, within 14 months, see the collapse of the last ever fully Liberal administration and the advent of the first coalition on 25 May 1915, the Dardanelles Campaign and the Shell Crisis.

=== Dardanelles Campaign ===
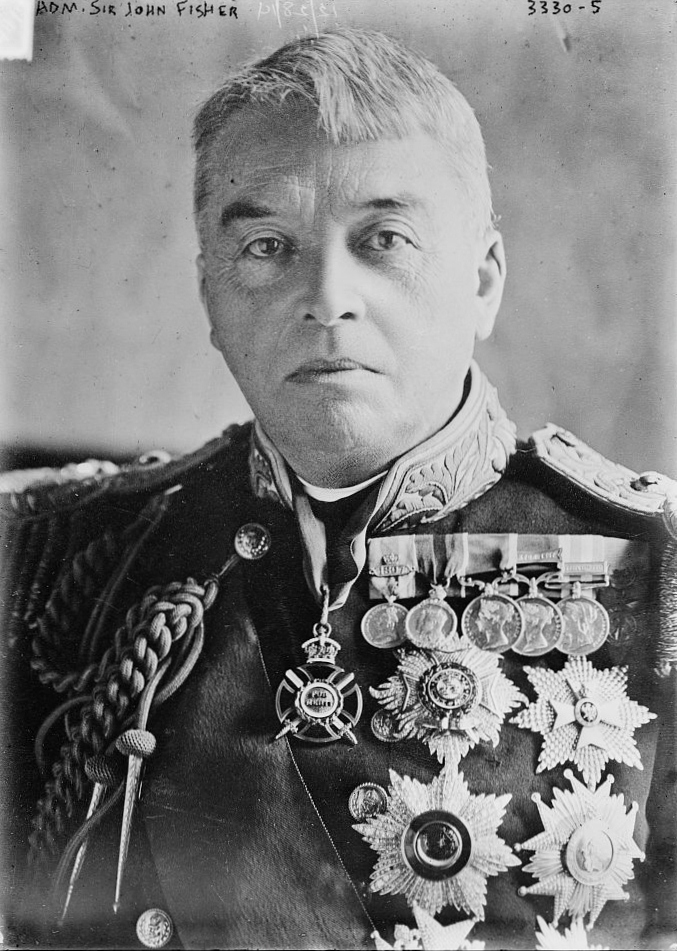
Admiral John Fisher

The Dardanelles Campaign was an attempt by Churchill and those favouring an Eastern strategy to end the stalemate on the Western Front. It envisaged an Anglo-French landing on Turkey's Gallipoli Peninsula and a rapid advance to Constantinople which would see the exit of Turkey from the conflict. The plan was rejected by Admiral John Fisher, the First Sea Lord, and Kitchener. Unable to provide decisive leadership, Asquith sought to arbitrate between these two and Churchill, leading to procrastination and delay. The naval attempt was badly defeated. Allied troops established bridgeheads on the Gallipoli Peninsula, but a delay in providing sufficient reinforcements allowed the Turks to regroup, leading to a stalemate Jenkins described "as immobile as that which prevailed on the Western Front". The Allies suffered from infighting at the top, poor equipment, incompetent leadership, and lack of planning, while facing the best units of the Ottoman army. The Allies sent in 492,000 men; they suffered 132,000 casualties in the humiliating defeat—with very high rates for Australia and New Zealand that permanently transformed those dominions. In Britain, it was political ruin for Churchill and badly hurt Asquith.

=== Shell Crisis of May 1915 ===
The opening of 1915 saw growing division between Lloyd George and Kitchener over the supply of munitions for the army. Lloyd George considered that a munitions department, under his control, was essential to co-ordinate "the nation's entire engineering capacity". Kitchener favoured the continuance of the current arrangement whereby munitions were sourced through contracts between the War Office and the country's armaments manufacturers. As so often, Asquith sought compromise through committee, establishing a group to "consider the much vexed question of putting the contracts for munitions on a proper footing". This did little to dampen press criticism and, on 20 April, Asquith sought to challenge his detractors in a major speech at Newcastle by saying, "I saw a statement the other day that the operations of our army were being crippled by our failure to provide the necessary ammunition. There is not a word of truth in that statement."

The press response was savage: 14 May 1915 saw the publication in The Times of a letter from their correspondent Charles à Court Repington which ascribed the British failure at the Battle of Aubers Ridge to a shortage of high explosive shells. Thus opened a fully fledged crisis, the Shell Crisis. The prime minister's wife correctly identified her husband's chief opponent, the Press baron, and owner of The Times, Lord Northcliffe: "I'm quite sure Northcliffe is at the bottom of all this," but failed to recognise the clandestine involvement of Sir John French, who leaked the details of the shells shortage to Repington. Northcliffe claimed that "the whole question of the supply of the munitions of war is one on which the Cabinet cannot be arraigned too sharply." Attacks on the government and on Asquith's personal lethargy came from the left as well as the right, C. P. Scott, the editor of The Manchester Guardian, writing, "The Government has failed most frightfully and discreditably in the matter of munitions."

=== Other events ===
Failures in both the East and the West began a tide of events that was to overwhelm Asquith's Liberal Government. Strategic setbacks combined with a shattering personal blow when, on 12 May 1915, Venetia Stanley announced her engagement to Edwin Montagu. Asquith's reply was immediate and brief, "As you know well, this breaks my heart. I couldn't bear to come and see you. I can only pray God to bless you—and help me." Venetia's importance to him is illustrated by a remark in a letter written in mid-1914: "Keep close to me beloved in this most critical time of my life. I know you will not fail." Her engagement, "a very treacherous return after all the joy you've given me", left him devastated. Significant though the loss was personally, its impact on Asquith politically can be overstated. The historian Stephen Koss notes that Asquith "was always able to divide his public and private lives into separate compartments (and) soon found new confidantes to whom he was writing with no less frequency, ardour and indiscretion."

This personal loss was immediately followed, on 15 May, by the resignation of Admiral Fisher after continuing disagreements with Churchill and in frustration at the disappointing developments in Gallipoli. Aged 74, Fisher's behaviour had grown increasingly erratic and, in frequent letters to Lloyd George, he gave vent to his frustrations with the First Lord of the Admiralty: "Fisher writes to me every day or two to let me know how things are going. He has a great deal of trouble with his chief, who is always wanting to do something big and striking." Adverse events, press hostility, Conservative opposition and personal sorrows assailed Asquith, and his position was further weakened by his Liberal colleagues. Cassar considers that Lloyd George displayed a distinct lack of loyalty, and Koss writes of the contemporary rumours that Churchill had "been up to his old game of intriguing all round" and reports a claim that Churchill "unquestionably inspired" the Repington Letter, in collusion with Sir John French. Lacking cohesion internally, and attacked from without, Asquith determined that his government could not continue and he wrote to the King, "I have come decidedly to the conclusion that the [Government] must be reconstituted on a broad and non-party basis."

== First Coalition: May 1915 – December 1916 ==
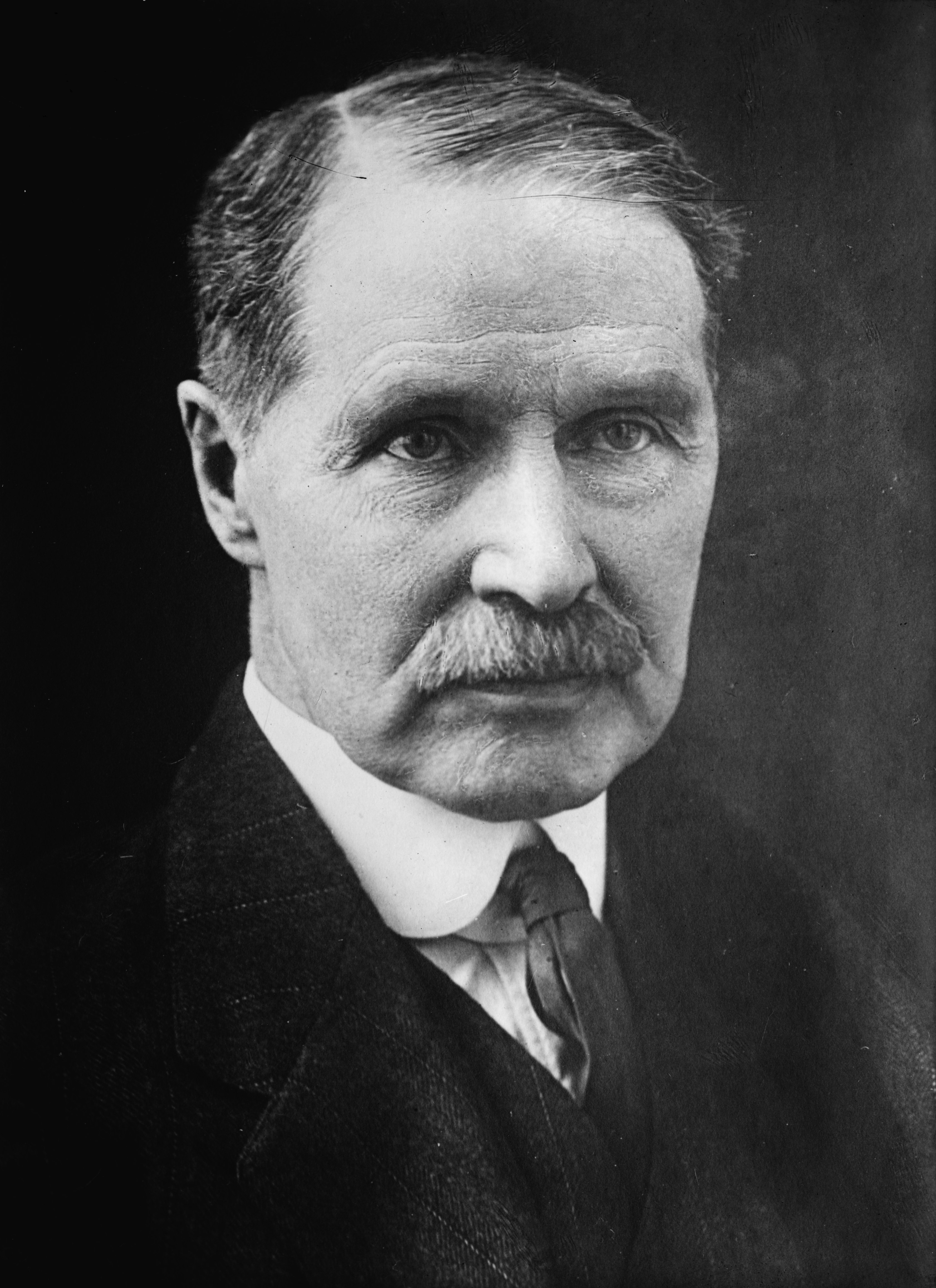
Bonar Law

The formation of the First Coalition saw Asquith display the political acuteness that seemed to have deserted him. But it came at a cost. This involved the sacrifice of two old political comrades: Churchill, who was blamed for the Dardanelles fiasco, and Haldane, who was wrongly accused in the press of pro-German sympathies. The Conservatives under Bonar Law made these removals a condition of entering government and, in sacking Haldane, who "made no difficulty", Asquith, committed "the most uncharacteristic fault of (his) whole career". In a letter to Grey, Asquith wrote of Haldane, "He is the oldest personal and political friend that I have in the world and, with him, you and I have stood together for the best part of 30 years." But he was unable to express these sentiments directly to Haldane, who was greatly hurt. Asquith handled the allocation of offices more successfully, appointing Law to the relatively minor post of Colonial Secretary, taking responsibility for munitions from Kitchener and giving it, as a new ministry, to Lloyd George and placing Balfour at the Admiralty, in place of Churchill, who was demoted to the sinecure Cabinet post of Chancellor of the Duchy of Lancaster. Overall the Liberals held 12 Cabinet seats, including most of the important ones, while the Conservatives held 8. Despite this outcome, many Liberals were dismayed, the dismissed Charles Hobhouse writing, "The disintegration of the Liberal Party is complete. Ll.G. and his Tory friends will soon get rid of Asquith." From a party, and a personal, perspective, the creation of the First Coalition was seen as a "notable victory for (Asquith), if not for the allied cause". But Asquith's dismissive handling of Law also contributed to his own and his party's later destruction.

=== War re-organisation ===
Having reconstructed his government, Asquith attempted a re-configuration of his war-making apparatus. The most important element of this was the establishment of the Ministry of Munitions, followed by the re-ordering of the War Council into a Dardanelles Committee, with Maurice Hankey as secretary and with a remit to consider all questions of war strategy.

The Munitions of War Act 1915 brought private companies supplying the armed forces under the tight control of the Minister of Munitions, Lloyd George. The policy, according to J. A. R. Marriott, was that:

no private interest was to be permitted to obstruct the service, or imperil the safety, of the State. Trade Union regulations must be suspended; employers' profits must be limited, skilled men must fight, if not in the trenches, in the factories; man-power must be economised by the dilution of labour and the employment of women; Private factories must pass under the control of the State, and new national factories be set up. Results justified the new policy: the output was prodigious; the goods were at last delivered.

Nevertheless, criticism of Asquith's leadership style continued. The Earl of Crawford, who had joined the Government as Minister of Agriculture, described his first Cabinet meeting in these terms: "It was a huge gathering, so big that it is hopeless for more than one or two to express opinions on each detail [...] Asquith somnolent—hands shaky and cheeks pendulous. He exercised little control over debate, seemed rather bored, but good humoured throughout." Lloyd George was less tolerant, George Riddell recording in his diary, "(He) says the P.M. should lead not follow and (Asquith) never moves until he is forced, and then it is usually too late." And crises, as well as criticism, continued to assail the Prime Minister, "envenomed by intra-party as well as inter-party rancour".

=== Conscription ===
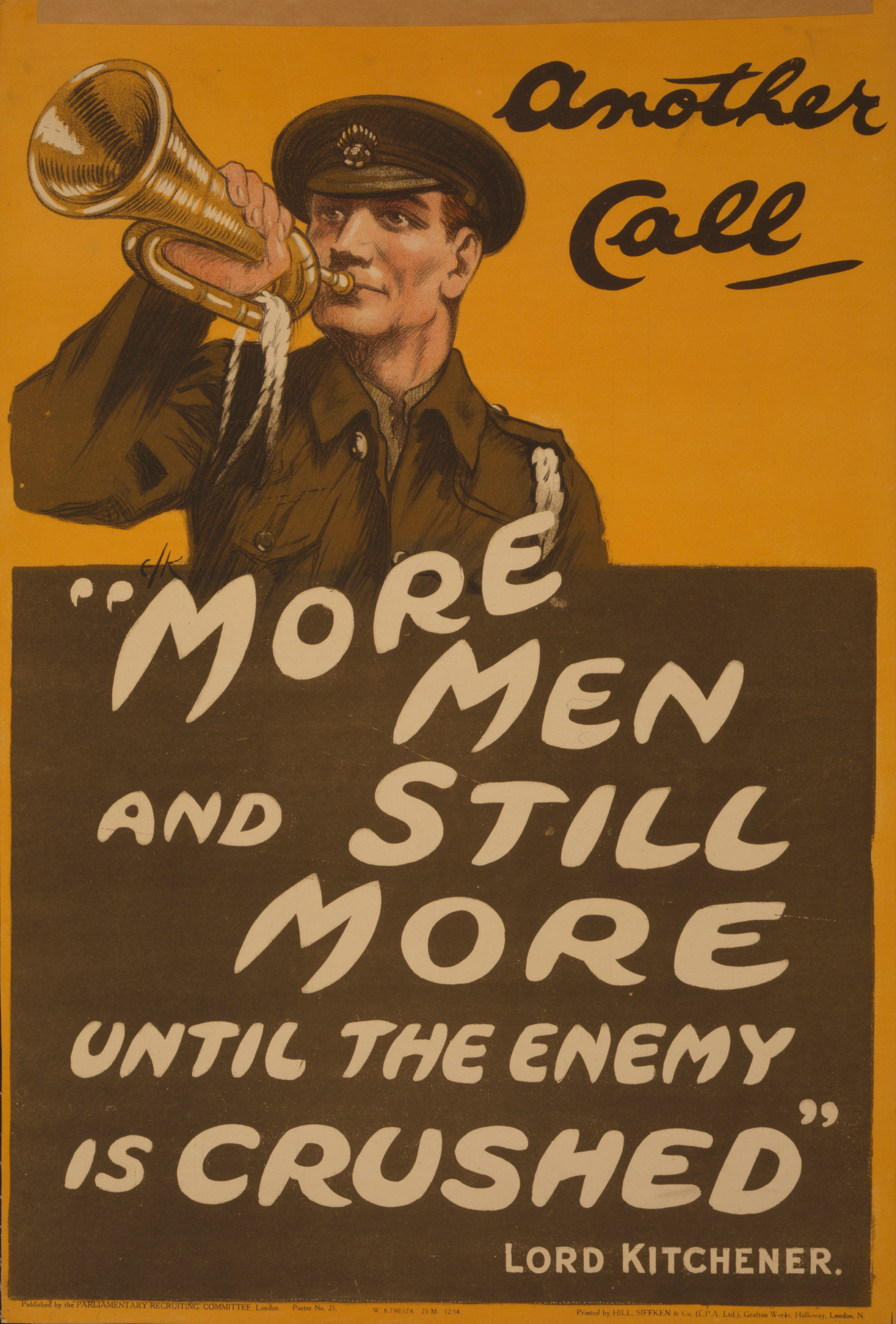
Lord Kitchener's call to arms

The insatiable demand for manpower for the Western Front had been foreseen early on. A volunteer system had been introduced at the outbreak of war, and Asquith was reluctant to change it for political reasons, as many Liberals, and almost all of their Irish Nationalist and Labour allies, were strongly opposed to conscription. Volunteer numbers dropped, not meeting the demands for more troops for Gallipoli, and much more strongly, for the Western Front. This made the voluntary system increasingly untenable; Asquith's daughter Violet wrote in March 1915, "Gradually every man with the average number of limbs and faculties is being sucked out to the war." In July 1915 the National Registration Act was passed, requiring compulsory registration for all men between the ages of 18 and 65. This was seen by many as the prelude to conscription but the appointment of Lord Derby as Director-General of Recruiting instead saw an attempt to rejuvenate the voluntary system, the Derby Scheme. Asquith's slow steps towards conscription continued to infuriate his opponents. Sir Henry Wilson, for example, wrote this to Leo Amery: "What is going to be the result of these debates? Will 'wait and see' win, or can that part of the Cabinet that is in earnest and is honest force that damned old Squiff into action?" The Prime Minister's balancing act, within Parliament and within his own party, was not assisted by a strident campaign against conscription conducted by his wife. Describing herself as "passionately against it", Margot Asquith engaged in one of her frequent influencing drives, by letters and through conversations, which had little impact other than doing "great harm" to Asquith's reputation and position.

By the end of 1915 it was clear that conscription was essential and Asquith laid the Military Service Act in the House of Commons on 5 January 1916. The Act introduced conscription of bachelors, and was extended to married men later in the year. Asquith's main opposition came from within his own party, particularly from Sir John Simon, who resigned. Asquith described Simon's stance in a letter to Sylvia Henley in these terms: "I felt really like a man who had been struck publicly in the face by his son." Some years later, Simon acknowledged his error by saying, "I have long since realised that my opposition was a mistake." Asquith's achievement in bringing the bill through without breaking up the government was considerable, to quote the estimation of his wife: "Henry's patience and skill in keeping Labour in this amazing change in England have stunned everyone," but the long struggle "hurt his own reputation and the unity of his party".

=== Ireland ===
On Easter Monday in 1916 a group of Irish Volunteers and members of the Irish Citizen Army seized a number of key buildings and locations in Dublin and elsewhere. There was heavy fighting over the next week before the Volunteers were forced to surrender. Distracted by conscription, Asquith and the Government were slow to appreciate the developing danger, which was exacerbated when, after hasty courts martial, a number of the Irish leaders were executed. On 11 May Asquith crossed to Dublin and, after a week of investigation, decided that the island's governance system was irredeemably broken, He turned to Lloyd George for a solution. Lloyd George brokered a settlement which would have seen Home Rule introduced at the end of the War, with the exclusion of Ulster. However, neither he, nor Asquith, appreciated the extent of Conservative opposition, the plan was strongly attacked in the House of Lords, and was abandoned thereafter. The episode damaged not only Lloyd George's reputation, but also that of Asquith. Walter Long spoke of the latter as "terribly lacking in decision". It also further widened the divide between Asquith and Lloyd George, and encouraged the latter in his plans for government reconstruction. Lloyd George remarked that "Mr. A gets very few cheers nowadays."

=== Progress of the war ===
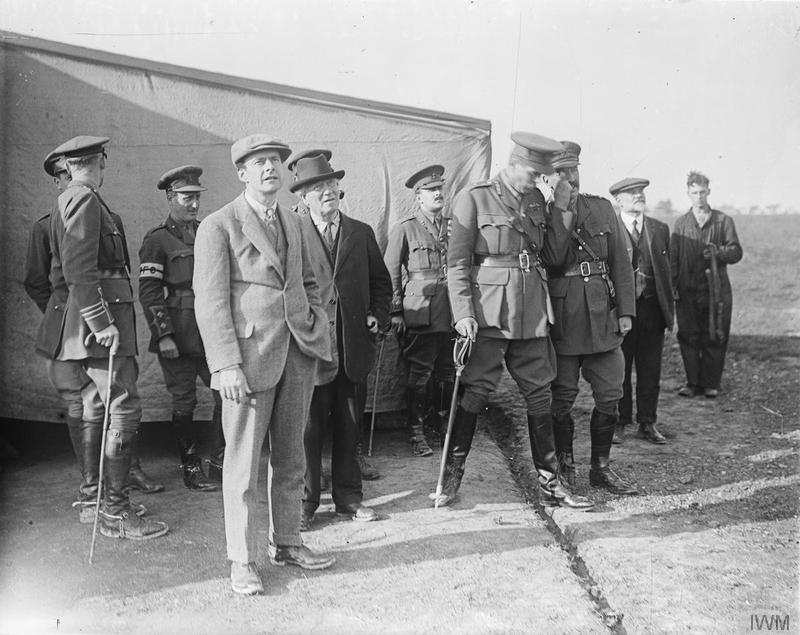
Asquith visits the front during the Battle of the Somme, 1916

Continued Allied failure and heavy losses at the Battle of Loos between September and October 1915 ended any remaining confidence in the British commander, Sir John French and in the judgement of Lord Kitchener. Asquith resorted to a favoured stratagem and, persuading Kitchener to undertake a tour of the Gallipoli battlefield in the hope that he could be persuaded to remain in the Mediterranean as Commander-in-Chief, took temporary charge of the War Office himself. He then replaced French with Sir Douglas Haig. In his diary for 10 December 1915, the latter recorded, "About 7 pm I received a letter from the Prime Minister marked 'Secret' and enclosed in three envelopes. It ran 'Sir J. French has placed in my hands his resignation ... Subject to the King's approval, I have the pleasure of proposing to you that you should be his successor.'" Asquith also appointed Sir William Robertson as Chief of the Imperial General Staff with increased powers, reporting directly to the Cabinet and with the sole right to give them military advice, relegating the Secretary of State for War to the tasks of recruiting and supplying the army. Lastly, he instituted a smaller Dardanelles Committee, re-christened the War Committee, with himself, Balfour, Law, Lloyd George and Reginald McKenna as members although, as this soon increased, the Committee continued the failings of its predecessor, being "too large and lack(ing) executive authority". None of this saved the Dardanelles Campaign and the decision to evacuate was taken in December, resulting in the resignation from the Duchy of Lancaster of Churchill, who wrote, "I could not accept a position of general responsibility for war policy without any effective share in its guidance and control." Further reverses took place in the Balkans: the Central Powers overran Serbia, forcing the Allied troops which had attempted to intervene back towards Salonika.

Early 1916 saw the start of the German offensive at Verdun, the "greatest battle of attrition in history". In late May, the only significant Anglo-German naval engagement of the War took place at The Battle of Jutland. Although a strategic success, the greater loss of ships on the Allied side brought early dismay. Lord Newton, Paymaster General and Parliamentary spokesman for the War office in Kitchener's absence, recorded in his diary, "Stupefying news of naval battle off Jutland. Whilst listening to the list of ships lost, I thought it the worst disaster that we had ever suffered." This despondency was compounded, for the nation, if not for his colleagues, when Lord Kitchener was killed in the sinking of HMS Hampshire on 5 June.

Asquith first considered taking the vacant War Office himself but then offered it to Law, who declined it in favour of Lloyd George. This was an important sign of growing unity of action between the two men and it filled Margot Asquith with foreboding: "I look upon this as the greatest political blunder of Henry's lifetime ... We are out: it can only be a question of time now when we shall have to leave Downing Street."

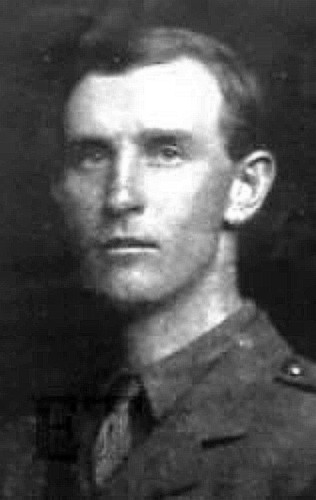
Raymond Asquith

Asquith followed this by agreeing to hold Commissions of Inquiry into the conduct of the Dardanelles and of the Mesopotamian campaign, where Allied forces had been forced to surrender at Kut. Sir Maurice Hankey, Secretary to the War Committee, considered that, "the Coalition never recovered. For (its) last five months, the function of the Supreme Command was carried out under the shadow of these inquests." But these mistakes were overshadowed by the limited progress and immense casualties of the Battle of the Somme, which began on 1 July 1916, and then by another devastating personal loss, the death of Asquith's son Raymond, on 15 September at the Battle of Flers–Courcelette. Asquith's relationship with his eldest son had not been easy. Raymond wrote to his wife in early 1916, "If Margot talks any more bosh to you about the inhumanity of her stepchildren you can stop her mouth by telling her that during my 10 months exile here the P.M. has never written me a line of any description." But Raymond's death was shattering. Violet wrote as follows: "...to see Father suffering so wrings one", and Asquith passed much of the following months "withdrawn and difficult to approach". The War brought no respite; Churchill remarked, "The failure to break the German line in the Somme, the recovery of the Germanic powers in the East [i.e. the defeat of the Brusilov Offensive], the ruin of Roumania and the beginnings of renewed submarine warfare strengthened and stimulated all those forces which insisted upon still greater vigour in the conduct of affairs."

== Fall: November–December 1916 ==
The events that led to the collapse of the First Coalition were exhaustively chronicled by almost all of the major participants (although Asquith himself was a notable exception), and have been studied by historians in the 100 years since. Although many of the accounts and studies differ in detail, and present a somewhat confusing picture overall, the outline is clear. As R. J. Q. Adams wrote, "The Prime Minister depended upon the majority of the gentlemen of Parliament, as greater ministers than he had learned in their time. The faith of that majority in Asquith's leadership had been shaken, and the appearance of a logical alternative destroyed him."

=== Nigeria debate and Lord Lansdowne's memorandum ===
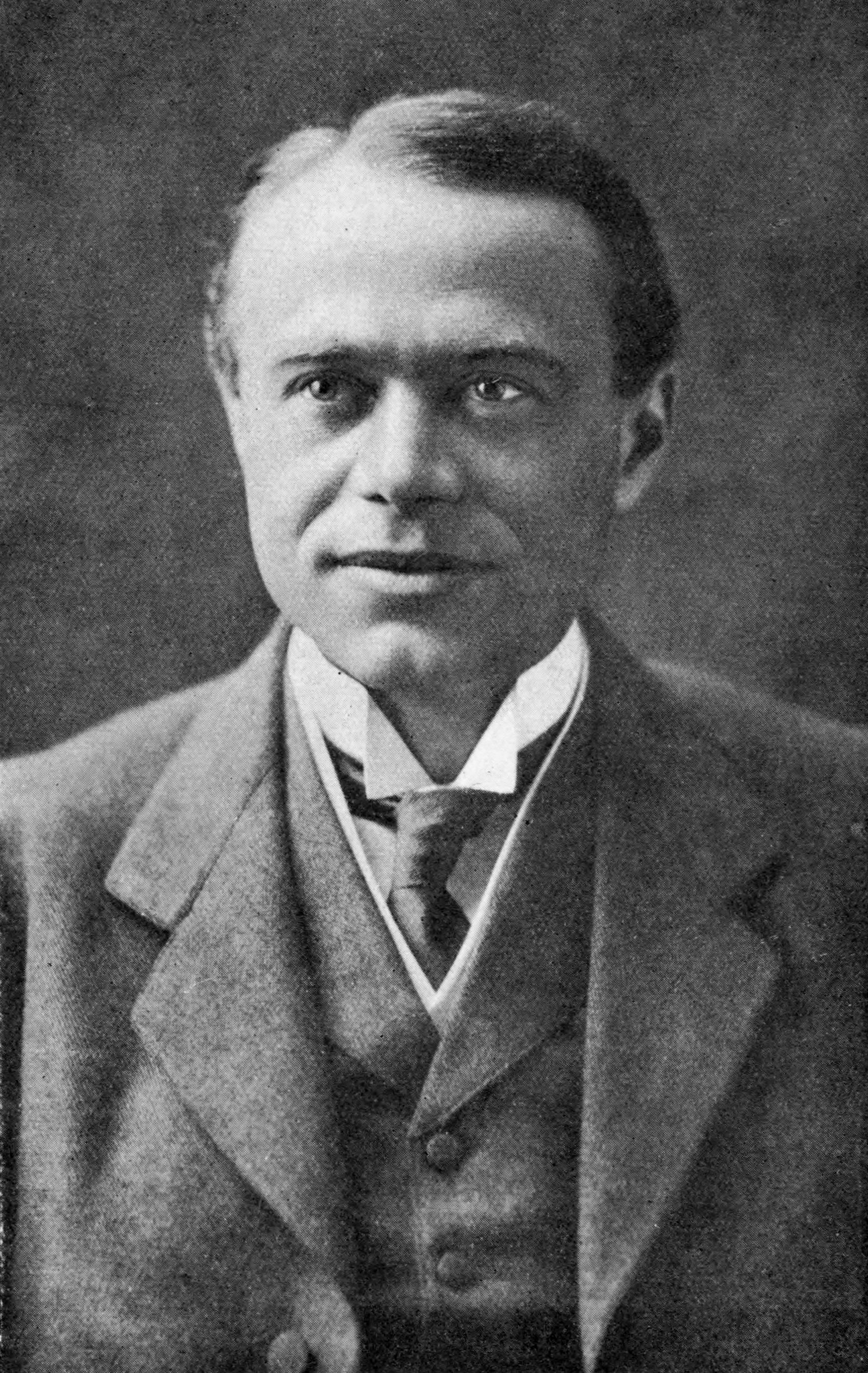
Max Aitken, 1st Baron Beaverbrook

The touch paper for the final crisis was the unlikely subject of the sale of captured German assets in Nigeria. As Colonial Secretary, the Conservative leader Bonar Law led the debate and was subject to a furious attack by Sir Edward Carson. The issue itself was trivial, but the fact that Law had been attacked by a leading member of his own party, and was not supported by Lloyd George (who absented himself from the House only to dine with Carson later in the evening), was not.

Margot Asquith immediately sensed the coming danger: "From that night it was quite clear that Northcliffe, Rothermere, Bonar, Carson, Ll.G (and a man called Max Aitken) were going to run the Government. I knew it was the end." Grey was similarly prescient and wrote, "Lloyd George means to break up the Government." Law saw the debate as a threat to his own political position, as well as another instance of lack of grip by the government.

The situation was further inflamed by the publication of a memorandum on future prospects in the war by Lord Lansdowne. Circulated on 13 November, it considered, and did not dismiss, the possibility of a negotiated settlement with the Central Powers. Asquith's critics immediately assumed that the memorandum represented his own views and that Lansdowne was being used as a stalking horse, Lord Crewe going so far as to suggest that the Lansdowne Memorandum was the "veritable causa causans (Note: Definition: The real, effective cause of damage) of the final break-up".

=== Triumvirate gathers ===
On 20 November 1916 Lloyd George, Carson and Law met at the Hyde Park Hotel. The meeting was organised by Max Aitken, who was to play central roles both in the forthcoming crisis and in its subsequent historiography. Max Aitken was a Canadian adventurer, millionaire, and close friend of Law. His book on the fall of the First Coalition, Politicians and the War 1914–1916, although always partial and sometimes inaccurate, gives a detailed insider's view of the events leading up to Asquith's political demise. The trio agreed on the necessity of overhauling the government and further agreed on the mechanism for doing so; the establishment of a small War Council, chaired by Lloyd George, with no more than five members and with full executive authority for the conduct of the war.

Asquith was to be retained as prime minister, and given honorific oversight of the War Council, but day-to-day operations would be directed by Lloyd George. This scheme, although often reworked, remained the basis of all proposals to reform the government until Asquith's fall on 6 December. Until almost the end, both Law and Lloyd George wished to retain Asquith as premier, but Aitken, Carson and Lord Northcliffe emphatically did not.

=== Power without responsibility ===
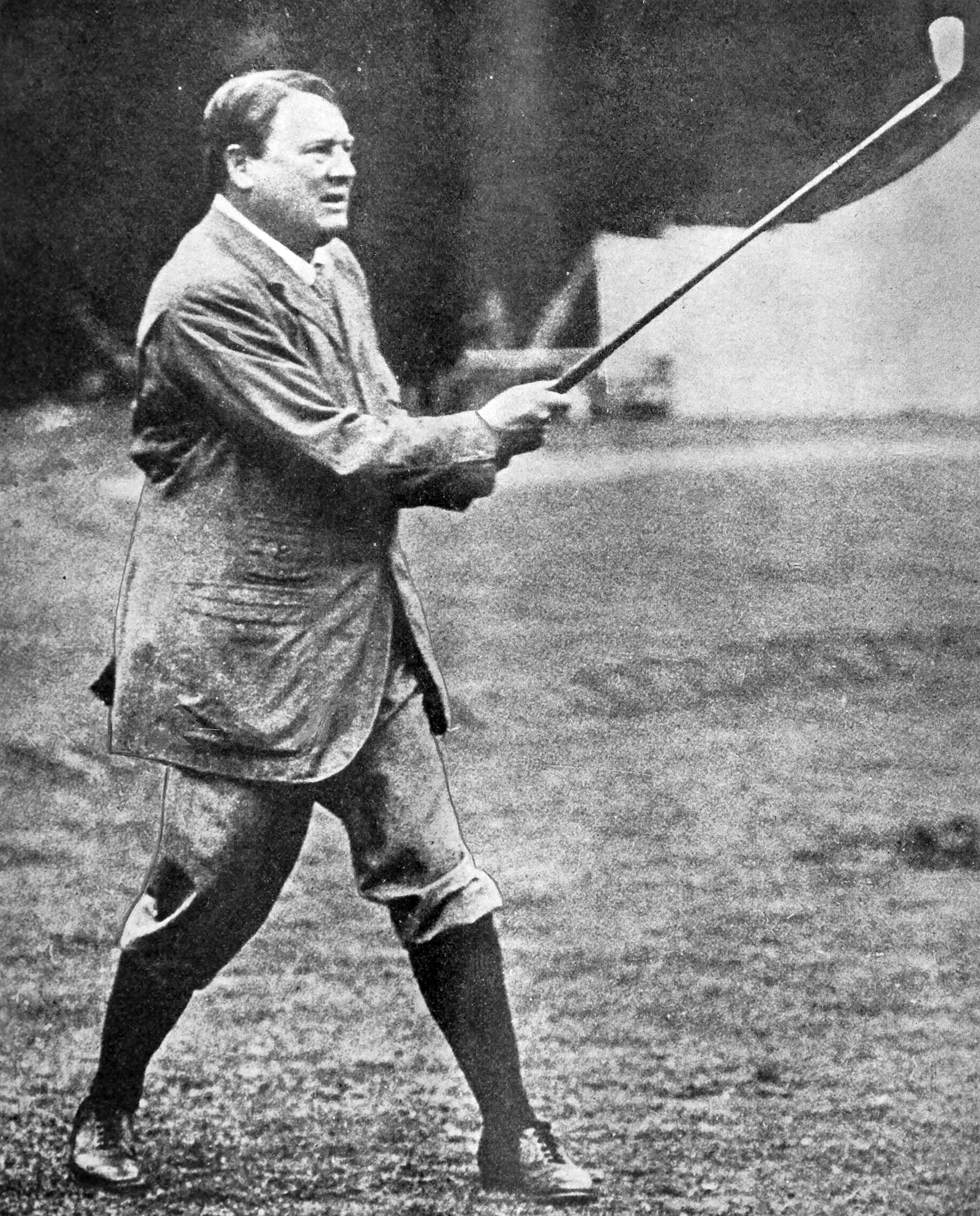
Lord Northcliffe teeing up

Lord Northcliffe's role was critical, as was the use Lloyd George made of him, and of the press in general. Northcliffe's involvement also highlights the limitations of both Aitken's and Lloyd George's accounts of Asquith's fall. Both minimised Northcliffe's part in the events. In his War Memoirs, Lloyd George stated emphatically "Lord Northcliffe was never, at any stage, brought into our consultations." Aitken supported this by saying, "Lord Northcliffe was not in active co-operation with Lloyd George."

But these claims are contradicted by others. In their biography of Northcliffe, Reginald Pound and Geoffrey Harmsworth record Northcliffe's brother Rothermere writing contemporaneously, "Alfred has been actively at work with Ll.G. with a view to bringing about a change." Riddell wrote in his diary for 27 May 1916: "LG never mentions directly that he sees Northcliffe but I am sure they are in daily contact." Margot Asquith was also certain of Northcliffe's role, and of Lloyd George's involvement, although she obscured both of their names when writing in her diary: "I only hope the man responsible for giving information to Lord N- will be heavily punished: God may forgive him; I never can."

The claims are also contradicted by events. Northcliffe met with Lloyd George on each of the three days just prior to Lloyd George's resignation, on 1, 2, and 3 December, including two meetings on 1 December, both before and after Lloyd George put his revised proposals for the War Council to Asquith. It seems improbable that ongoing events were not discussed and that the two men confined their conversations to negotiating article circulation rights for Lloyd George once he had resigned, as Pound and Harmsworth weakly suggest.

The attempts made by others to use Northcliffe and the wider press also merit consideration. In this regard, some senior military officers were extremely active. Robertson, for example, wrote to Northcliffe in October 1916, "The Boche gives me no trouble compared with what I meet in London. So any help you can give me will be of Imperial value." Lastly, the actions of Northcliffe's newspapers must be considered—in particular The Times editorial on 4 December which led Asquith to reject Lloyd George's final War Council proposals. Thompson, Northcliffe's most recent biographer, concludes, "From the evidence, it appears that Northcliffe and his newspapers should be given more credit than they have generally received for the demise of the Asquith government in December 1916."

=== To-ing and fro-ing ===
Law met again with Carson and Lloyd George on 25 November and, with Aitken's help, drafted a memorandum for Asquith's signature. This would see a "Civilian General Staff", with Lloyd George as chairman and Asquith as president, attending irregularly but with the right of referral to Cabinet as desired. This Law presented to Asquith, who committed to reply on Monday the following week.

His reply was an outright rejection; the proposal was impossible "without fatally impairing the confidence of colleagues, and undermining my own authority." Law took Asquith's response to Carson and Lloyd George at Law's office in the Colonial Office. All were uncertain of the next steps. Law decided it would be appropriate to meet with his senior Conservative colleagues, something he had not previously done. He saw Austen Chamberlain, Lord Curzon and Lord Robert Cecil on Thursday 30 November. All were united in opposition to Lloyd George's War Council plans, with Chamberlain writing, "(we) were unanimously of opinion (sic) that (the plans) were open to grave objection and made certain alternative proposals."

Lloyd George had also been reflecting on the substance of the scheme and, on Friday 1 December, he met with Asquith to put forward an alternative. This would see a War Council of three, the two Service ministers and a third without portfolio. One of the three, presumably Lloyd George although this was not explicit, would be chairman. Asquith, as prime minister, would retain "supreme control."

Asquith's reply the same day did not constitute an outright rejection, but he did demand that he retain the chairmanship of the council. As such, it was unacceptable to Lloyd George and he wrote to Law the next day (Saturday 2 December), "I enclose copy of P.M.'s letter. The life of the country depends on resolute action by you now."

=== Last four days: Sunday 3 December to Wednesday 6 December ===
In a four-day crisis Asquith was unaware how fast he was losing support. Lloyd George now had growing Unionist support, the backing of Labour and (thanks to the efforts of Christopher Addison) a majority of Liberal MPs. Asquith fell and Lloyd George answered the loud demands for a much more decisive government. He energetically set up a new small war cabinet, a cabinet secretariat under Hankey, and a secretariat of private advisors in the 'Garden Suburb' to move towards prime ministerial control.

==== Sunday 3 December ====
Sunday 3 December saw the Conservative leadership meet at Law's house, Pembroke Lodge. They gathered against a backdrop of ever-growing press involvement, in part fomented by Max Aitken. That morning's Reynold's News, owned and edited by Lloyd George's close associate Henry Dalziel, had published an article setting out Lloyd George's demands to Asquith and claiming that he intended to resign and take his case to the country if they were not met. At Law's house, the Conservatives present drew up a resolution which they demanded Law present to Asquith.

This document, subsequently the source of much debate, stated that "the Government cannot continue as it is; the Prime Minister (should) tender the resignation of the Government" and, if Asquith was unwilling to do that, the Conservative members of the Government would "tender (their) resignations." The meaning of this resolution is unclear, and even those who contributed to it took away differing interpretations.

Chamberlain felt that it left open the options of either Asquith or Lloyd George as premier, dependent on who could gain greater support. Curzon, in a letter of that day to Lansdowne, stated that no one at the Pembroke Lodge meeting felt that the war could be won under Asquith's continued leadership, and that the issue for the Liberal politicians to resolve was whether Asquith remained in a Lloyd George administration in a subordinate role, or left the government altogether. Max Aitken's claim that the resolution's purpose was to ensure that "Lloyd George should go" is not supported by most of the contemporary accounts, or by the assessments of most subsequent historians.

As one example, Gilmour, Curzon's biographer, writes that the Unionist ministers "did not, as Beaverbrook alleged, decide to resign themselves in order to strengthen the Prime Minister's hand against Lloyd George..(their intentions) were completely different." Similarly, Adams, Law's latest biographer, describes Aitken's interpretation of the resolution as "convincingly overturned". John Ramsden is equally clear: "the Unionist ministers acted to strengthen Lloyd George's hand, from a conviction that only greater power for Lloyd George could put enough drive into the war effort."

Law then took the resolution to Asquith, who had, unusually, broken his weekend at Walmer Castle to return to Downing Street. At their meeting Law sought to convey the content of his colleagues' earlier discussion but failed to produce the resolution itself. That it was never actually shown to Asquith is incontrovertible, and Asquith confirmed this in his writings. Law's motives in not handing it over are more controversial. Law himself maintained he simply forgot. Jenkins charges him with bad faith, or neglect of duty. Adams suggests that Law's motives were more complex (the resolution also contained a clause condemning the involvement of the press, prompted by the Reynold's News story of that morning) and that, in continuing to seek an accommodation between Asquith and Lloyd George, Law felt it prudent not to share the actual text.

The outcome of the interview between Law and Asquith was clear, even if Law had not been. Asquith immediately decided that an accommodation with Lloyd George, and a substantial reconstruction to placate the Unionist ministers, were required. He summoned Lloyd George and together they agreed a compromise that was, in fact, little different from Lloyd George's 1 December proposals. The only substantial amendment was that Asquith would have daily oversight of the War Council's work and a right of veto. John Grigg saw this compromise as "very favourable to Asquith". Cassar is less certain: "The new formula left him in a much weaker position[, his] authority merely on paper for he was unlikely to exercise his veto lest it bring on the collective resignation of the War Council." Nevertheless, Asquith, Lloyd George, and Law who had rejoined them at 5.00 pm, all felt a basis for a compromise had been reached, and they agreed that Asquith would issue a bulletin that evening announcing the reconstruction of the Government. Crewe, who joined Asquith at Montagu's house at 10.00 pm, recorded: "accommodation with Mr. Lloyd George would ultimately be achieved, without sacrifice of (Asquith's) position as chief of the War Committee; a large measure of reconstruction would satisfy the Unionist Ministers."

Despite Lloyd George's denials of collaboration, the diary for 3 December by Northcliffe's factotum Tom Clarke, records that: "The Chief returned to town and at 7.00 o'clock he was at the War Office with Lloyd George." Meanwhile, Duff Cooper was invited to dinner at Montagu's Queen Anne's Gate house, he afterwards played bridge with Asquith, Venetia Montagu and Churchill's sister-in-law "Goonie", recording in his diary : "..the P.M. more drunk than I have ever seen him, (..) so drunk that one felt uncomfortable ... an extraordinary scene."

==== Monday 4 December ====
The bulletin was published on the morning of Monday 4 December. It was accompanied by an avalanche of press criticism, all of it intensely hostile to Asquith. The worst was a leader in Northcliffe's Times. This had full details of the compromise reached the day before, including the names of those suggested as members of the War Council. More damagingly still, it ridiculed Asquith, claiming he had conspired in his own humiliation and would henceforth be "Prime Minister in name only." Lloyd George's involvement is uncertain; he denied any, but Asquith was certain he was the source. The author was certainly the editor, Geoffrey Dawson, with some assistance from Carson. But it seems likely that Carson's source was Lloyd George.

The leak prompted an immediate reaction from Asquith: "Unless the impression is at once corrected that I am being relegated to the position of an irresponsible spectator of the War, I cannot possibly go on." Lloyd George's reply was prompt and conciliatory: "I cannot restrain nor I fear influence Northcliffe. I fully accept in letter and in spirit your summary of the suggested arrangement—subject of course to personnel." But Asquith's mind was already turning to rejection of the Sunday compromise and outright confrontation with Lloyd George.

It is unclear exactly whom Asquith spoke with on 4 December. Beaverbrook and Crewe state he met Chamberlain, Curzon and Cecil. Cassar follows these opinions, to a degree. But Chamberlain himself was adamant that he and his colleagues met Asquith only once during the crisis and that was on the following day, Tuesday 5 December. Chamberlain wrote at the time, "On Tuesday afternoon the Prime Minister sent for Curzon, Bob Cecil and myself. This is the first and only time the three of us met Asquith during those fateful days." His recollection is supported by details of their meetings with Law and other colleagues, in the afternoon, and then in the evening of the 4th, and by most modern historians, e.g. Gilmour and Adams. Crawford records how little he and his senior Unionist colleagues were involved in the key discussions, and by implication, how much better informed were the press lords, writing in his diary: "We were all in such doubt as to what had actually occurred, and we sent out for an evening paper to see if there was any news!" Asquith certainly did meet his senior Liberal colleagues on the evening of 4 December; they were unanimously opposed to compromise with Lloyd George and supported Asquith's growing determination to fight. His way forward had been cleared by his tendering the resignation of his government to the King earlier in the day. Asquith also saw Law, who confirmed that he would resign if Asquith failed to implement the War Council agreement as discussed only the day before. In the evening, and having declined two requests for meetings, Asquith threw down the gauntlet to Lloyd George by rejecting the War Council proposal.

==== Tuesday 5 December ====
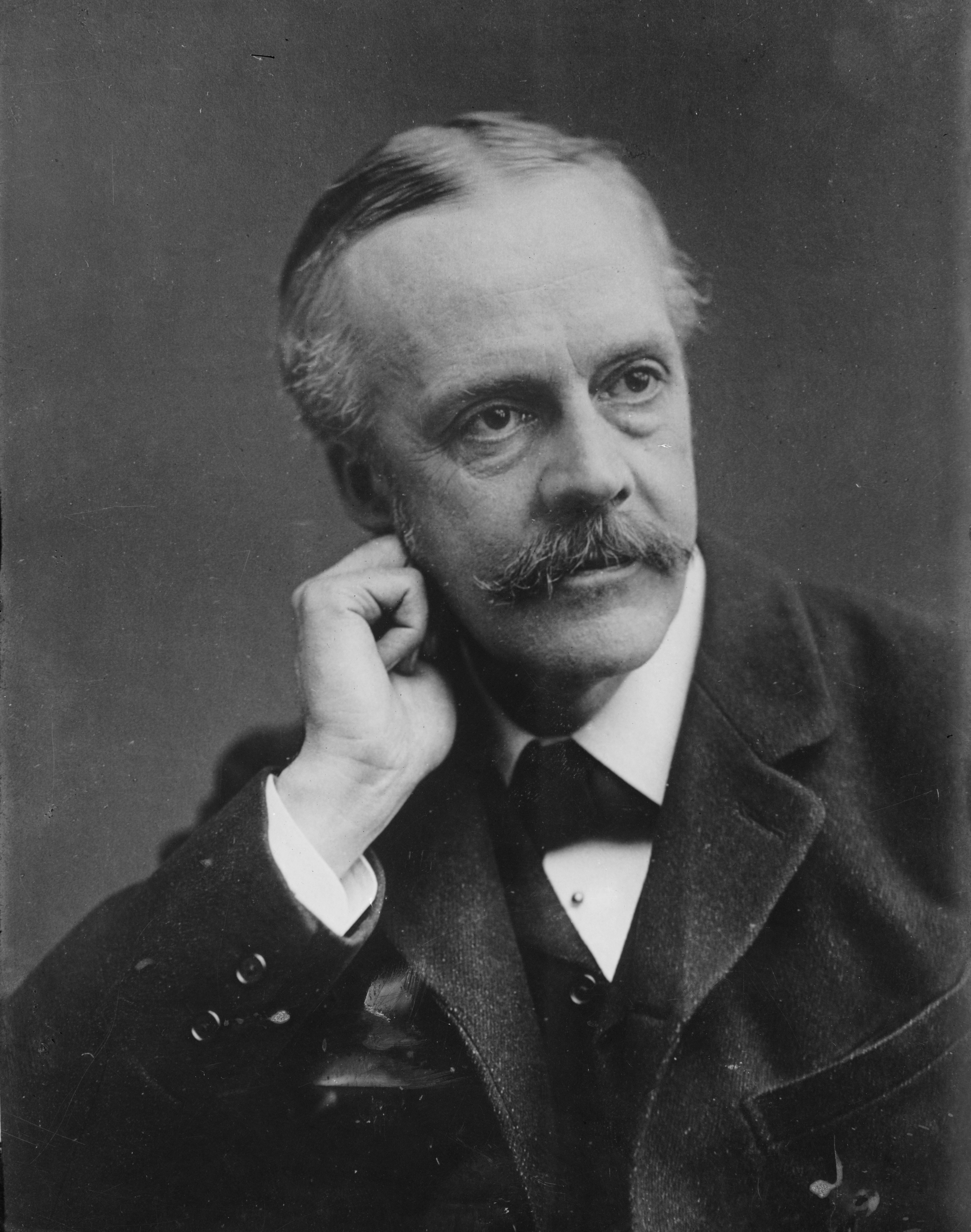
Arthur Balfour

Lloyd George accepted the challenge by return of post, writing: "As all delay is fatal in war, I place my office without further parley at your disposal." Asquith had anticipated this response, but was surprised by a letter from Arthur Balfour, who until that point had been removed from the crisis by illness. On its face, this letter merely offered confirmation that Balfour believed that Lloyd George's scheme for a smaller War Council deserved a chance and that he had no wish to remain at the Admiralty if Lloyd George wished him out. Jenkins argues that Asquith should have recognised it as a shift of allegiance. Asquith discussed the crisis with Lord Crewe and they agreed an early meeting with the Unionist ministers was essential. Without their support, "it would be impossible for Asquith to continue."

Asquith's meeting with Chamberlain, Curzon and Cecil at 3.00 p.m. only highlighted the weakness of his position. They unanimously declined to serve in a Government that did not include Law and Lloyd George, as a Government so constituted offered no "prospect of stability". Their reply to Asquith's follow-up question as to whether they would serve under Lloyd George caused him even more concern. The "Three Cs" stated they would serve under Lloyd George if he could create the stable Government they considered essential for the effective prosecution of the war.

The end was near, and a further letter from Balfour declining to reconsider his earlier decision brought it about. The Home Secretary, Herbert Samuel, recorded in a contemporaneous note: "We were all strongly of opinion, from which [Asquith] did not dissent, that there was no alternative [to resignation]. We could not carry on without LlG and the Unionists and ought not to give the appearance of wishing to do so."

At 7.00 pm, having been prime minister for eight years and 241 days, Asquith went to Buckingham Palace and tendered his resignation. Describing the event to a friend sometime later, Asquith wrote, "When I fully realised what a position had been created, I saw that I could not go on without dishonour or impotence, or both." That evening, he dined at Downing Street with family and friends, his daughter-in-law Cynthia describing the scene: "I sat next to the P.M.—he was too darling—rubicund, serene, puffing a guinea cigar and talking of going to Honolulu." Cynthia believed that he would be back "in the saddle" within a fortnight with his position strengthened.

Later that evening Law, who had been to the Palace to receive the King's commission, arrived to enquire whether Asquith would serve under him. Lord Crewe described Asquith's reply as "altogether discouraging, if not definitely in the negative." (Note: That evening, Aitken and Churchill were dining with F. E. Smith at the latter's Grosvenor Gardens home. The dinner ended acrimoniously, as Aitken records: "'Smith,' said Winston with great emphasis, 'This man knows I am not to be in the Government.' He picked up his coat and hat and dashed into the street ... a curious end to the day." Churchill was detested by the Conservatives for his defection to the Liberals in 1904, for his role as an active, partisan Liberal thereafter, and for his role in the disastrous Dardanelles campaign; despite his energy and ability Lloyd George was not able to bring him back into the government until the summer of 1917.)

==== Wednesday 6 December ====
I am personally very sorry for poor old Squiff. He has had a hard time and even when 'exhilarated' seems to have had more capacity and brain power than any of the others. However, I expect more action and less talk is needed now

— General Douglas Haig on Asquith's fall (6 December)

Wednesday saw an afternoon conference at Buckingham Palace, hosted by the King and chaired by Balfour. There is some doubt as to the originator of the idea, although Adams considers that it was Law. This is supported by a handwritten note of Aitken's, reproduced in A. J. P. Taylor's life of that politician, which reads: "6th Wed. Meeting at BL house with G. (Lloyd George) and C. (Carson)—Decide on Palace Conference." Conversely, Crewe suggests that the suggestion came jointly from Lord Derby and Edwin Montagu.

However the meeting came about, it did not bring the compromise the King sought. Within two hours of its break-up, Asquith, after consulting his Liberal colleagues, except for Lloyd George, declined to serve under Law, who accordingly declined the King's commission. At 7.00 pm. Lloyd George was invited to form a Government. In just over twenty four hours he had done so, forming a small War Cabinet instead of the mooted War Council, and at 7.30 pm on Thursday 7 December he kissed hands as prime minister.

Lloyd George's achievement in creating a government was considerable, given that almost all of the senior Liberals sided with Asquith. Balfour's acceptance of the Foreign Office made it possible. Others placed a greater responsibility on Asquith as the author of his own downfall, for example Churchill: "A fierce, resolute Asquith, fighting with all his powers would have conquered easily. But the whole trouble arose from the fact that there was no fierce resolute Asquith to win this war or any other."

== Wartime Opposition Leader: 1916–1918 ==
The Asquiths finally vacated 10 Downing Street on 9 December. Asquith, not normally given to displays of emotion, confided to his wife that he felt he had been stabbed. He likened himself (10 December) to the Biblical character Job, although he also commented that Aristide Briand's government was also under strain in France. Lord Newton wrote in his diary of meeting Asquith at dinner a few days after the fall, "It became painfully evident that he was suffering from an incipient nervous breakdown and before leaving the poor man completely collapsed." Asquith was particularly appalled at Balfour's behaviour, especially as he had argued against Lloyd George to retain Balfour at the Admiralty. Writing years later, Margot's spleen was still evident: "between you and me, this is what hurt my husband more than anything else. That Lloyd George (a Welshman!) should betray him, he dimly did understand, but that Arthur should join his enemy and help to ruin him, he never understood."

Asquith's fall was met with rejoicing in much of the British and Allied press and sterling rallied against the German mark on the New York markets. Press attacks on Asquith continued and indeed increased after the publication of the Dardanelles Report.

Like Sir Robert Peel after 1846, Asquith after 1916 still controlled the party machinery and resented those who had ousted him, but showed no real interest in reuniting his party. Asquith did not put any pressure on Liberals to eschew joining the coalition government; in fact, though, few Liberals did join it. Most Liberal parliamentarians remained intensely loyal to him, and felt that he alone should not be left to face the criticism. On 8 December a gathering of Liberal MPs gave Asquith a vote of confidence as Leader of the Liberal Party, followed unanimously a few days later by the executive of the National Liberal Federation. There was much hostility to Lloyd George at these gatherings.

Within Parliament, Asquith pursued a course of quiet support, retaining a "heavy, continuing responsibility for the decision of August 4, 1914." A. G. Gardiner in The Daily News (9 December) stated explicitly that Lloyd George's government should not have to live under the constant barrage of criticism that Asquith's coalition had endured. In a "gracious" reply to Lloyd George's first speech in the House of Commons as prime minister on 19 December 1916, Asquith made clear that he did not see his role "in any sense to be the leader of what is called an opposition". From around the spring of 1917 Asquith's reluctance to criticise the government at all began to exasperate some of his press supporters.

Outside of the Commons, Margot and he returned to 20 Cavendish Square and he divided his life between there, The Wharf and visiting. Money, in the absence of his premier's salary, became more of a concern. In March 1917 he was informally offered the Lord Chancellorship, with the highest salary in government, but he declined. Personal sadness continued in December 1917 when Asquith's third son Arthur, known in the family as "Oc", was badly wounded fighting in France; his leg was amputated in January 1918. Asquith's daughter-in-law recorded in her diary, "The Old Boy (Asquith) sent me fifteen pounds and also, in a letter, told me the sad news of poor, dear Oc having been badly wounded again."

=== Maurice Debate ===
On 7 May 1918 a letter from a serving officer, Major-General Sir Frederick Maurice, appeared in four London newspapers, accusing Lloyd George and Law of having misled the House of Commons in debates the previous month as to the manpower strength of the army in France. Asquith, who received a letter from Maurice on 6 May, and had also been in contact with the sacked Robertson, with whom Maurice discussed the letter, called for a Select Committee of the House to investigate the charges.

In response to a private notice question, Law had offered a judicial inquiry, with Asquith free to choose the judges, but Asquith declined this offer on the evening of 7 May, thinking it contrary to the dignity of Parliament. Prior to the debate, Asquith received a surprising communication (8 May) from H. A. Gwynne, the editor of The Morning Post, and previously a fervent opponent. "The effect of the Maurice letter, and your motion, must be the dissolution of the present government (and) your accession to power." At this point "Asquith hated Lloyd George with a passion" but he did not want the premiership for himself.

Asquith's opening speech on the Select Committee motion was lengthy and lacked punch. William Bridgeman recorded, "He did not make much of a case, and did not even condemn Maurice's breach of the King's Regulations, for which he got a very heavy blow from L.G.". Lloyd George's one-and-a-quarter-hour-long reply was "a stunning solo display by the greatest rhetorician of his age" in which he threatened the House with the inevitable political consequence of a vote for Asquith's motion. "... if this motion is carried, he [Asquith] will again be responsible for the conduct of the War. Make no mistake!"

John Ramsden summed up the opinion in the House of Commons: "Lloyd George's lies were (preferred to) Asquith's half-measures." The motion was defeated by 293 votes to 106, more an "utter rejection of Asquith, than (a) wholehearted endorsement of Lloyd George", and the latter's position in Parliament was not seriously threatened for the remainder of the War.

=== End of the war ===
Asquith was left politically discredited by the Maurice Debate and by the clear turn of the war in the Allies' favour from the summer of 1918. He devoted far more effort to his Romanes Lecture "Some Aspects of the Victorian Age" at Oxford in June 1918 than to any political speech. However, Lady Ottoline Morrell thought it "a dull address". A letter of July 1918 describes a typical couple of days. "Nothing much is happening here. I dined with the usual crowd at Mrs. Astor's last night. The Duke of Connaught lunches here on Friday: don't you wish you were coming!"

The beginning of the end of the war began where it had begun, with the last German offensive on the Western Front, the Second Battle of the Marne. "The tide of German success was stemmed and the ebb began under pressure of the great Allied counter-stroke." In response to the Allied offensives, "the governments of the Central Powers were everywhere in collapse".

== Decline and eclipse: 1918–1926 ==
=== Coupon election ===
Even before the Armistice, Lloyd George had been considering the political landscape and, on 2 November 1918, wrote to Law proposing an immediate election with a formal endorsement—for which Asquith coined the name "Coupon", with overtones of wartime food rationing—for Coalition candidates. News of his plans soon reached Asquith, causing considerable concern. On 6 November he wrote to Hilda Henderson, "I suppose that tomorrow we shall be told the final decision about this accursed election." A Liberal delegation met Lloyd George in the week of 6 November to propose Liberal reunification but was swiftly rebuffed.

Asquith joined in the celebrations of the Armistice, speaking in the Commons, attending the service of thanksgiving at St Margaret's, Westminster and afterwards lunching with King George. Asquith had a friendly meeting with Lloyd George a few days after the Armistice (the exact date is unclear), which Lloyd George began by saying "I understand you don't wish to join the government." Asquith was instead keen to go to the Peace Conference, where he considered his expertise at finance and international law would have been an asset. As he refused to accept public subordination, Lloyd George, despite lobbying from the King and Churchill, refused to invite him.

Asquith led the Liberal Party into the election, but with a singular lack of enthusiasm, writing on 25 November: "I doubt whether there is much interest. The whole thing is a wicked fraud." The Liberal leaders expected to lose the 1918 election badly, as they had lost the "Khaki Election" in 1900, but did not foresee the sheer scale of the defeat. Asquith hoped for 100 Liberal MPs to be returned. He began by attacking the Conservatives, but was eventually driven to attack the "blank cheque" which the government was demanding.

Asquith was one of five people given a free pass by the Coalition but the East Fife Unionist Association defied national instructions and put up a candidate, Alexander Sprot, against him. Sprot was refused a Coalition "coupon". Asquith assumed his own seat would be safe and spent only two and half days there, speaking only to closed meetings; in one speech there on 11 December he conceded that he did not want to "displace" the current government. He scoffed at press rumours that he was being barracked by a gang of discharged soldiers. Postwar reconstruction, the desire for harsh peace terms, and Asquith's desire to attend the peace talks, were campaign issues, with posters asking: "Asquith nearly lost you the War. Are you going to let him spoil the Peace?" James Scott, his chairman at East Fife, wrote of "a swarm of women going from door to door indulging in a slander for which they had not a shadow of proof. This was used for such a purpose as to influence the female vote very much against you." (Note: The exact nature of the slander is not specified. The Asquiths had been the subject of rumour about their supposed pro-German sympathies, and Noel Pemberton Billing had put it about that they had been amongst public figures seduced by German agents with sexual favours, lesbian ones in Margot's case.)

At the poll on 14 December, Lloyd George's coalition won a landslide, with Asquith and every other former Liberal Cabinet minister losing his seat. Margot later recorded having telephoned Liberal headquarters for the results: "Give me the East Fife figures: Asquith 6994—Sprott [sic] 8996." She said she had exclaimed "Asquith beat? ... Thank God!" Augustine Birrell also wrote to him "You are surely better off out of it for the time, than watching Ll.G. lead apes to Hell". But for Asquith personally, "the blow was crippling, a personal humiliation which destroyed his hope of exercising any influence on the peace settlement."

=== 1919: out of Parliament ===
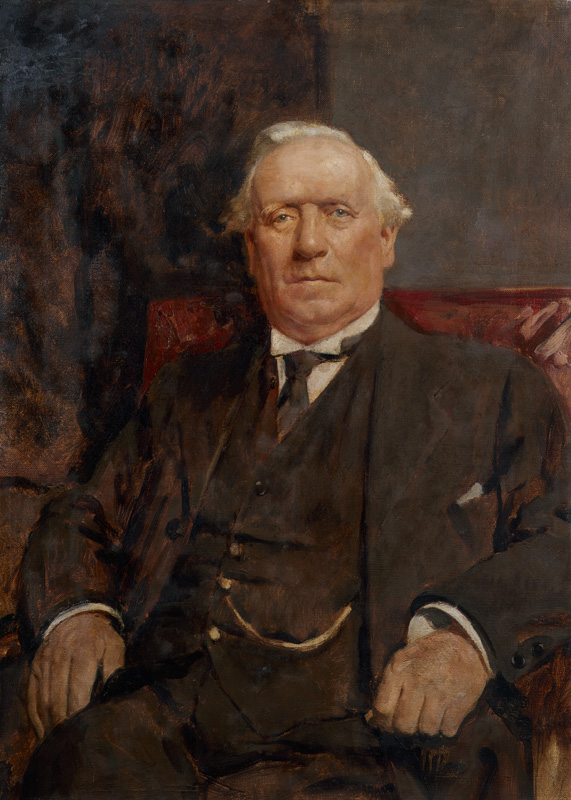
1919 portrait by André Cluysenaar

Asquith remained leader of the Liberal Party, despite McKenna vainly urging him, almost immediately after the election, to offer his resignation to the National Liberal Federation and help with building an alliance with Labour. At first Asquith was extremely unpopular, and there is no evidence that he was invited to address any Liberal Association anywhere in the country for the first six months of 1919. He continued to be calumnied in the press and Parliament over the supposed presence of Germans in Downing Street during the war.

Although accounts differ as to the exact numbers, around 29 uncouponed Liberals had been elected, only three with any junior ministerial experience, not all of them opponents of the coalition. There was widespread discontent at Asquith's leadership, and Sir T. A. Bramsdon, who said that he had been elected at Portsmouth only by promising not to support Asquith, protested openly at his remaining leader from outside the Commons. At first Lloyd George extended the government whip to all Liberal MPs. On 3 February 23 non-coalition Liberals formed themselves into a "Free Liberal" group (soon known as the "Wee Frees" after a Scottish religious sect of that name); they accepted Asquith's appointment of Sir Donald Maclean as chairman in his absence but insisted that G.R. Thorne, whom Asquith had appointed Chief Whip, should hold that job jointly with J.M. Hogge, of whom Asquith and Maclean had a low opinion. After a brief attempt to set up a joint committee with the Coalition Liberal MPs to explore reunion, the "Wee Frees" resigned the government whip on 4 April, although some Liberal MPs still remained of uncertain allegiance. The Liberals won by-elections in March and April 1919, but thereafter Labour performed better than the Liberals in by-elections.

In April 1919 Asquith gave a weak speech to Liberal candidates, his first public speech since the election. In Newcastle (15 May) he gave a slightly stronger speech, encouraged by his audience to "Hit Out!" Asquith was also disappointed by the "terms and spirit" of the Treaty of Versailles in May, but did not oppose it very strongly in public. On 31 July 1919, after a lunch in honour of the former Supreme Allied Commander Ferdinand Foch, Asquith wrote "he talked a lot of nonsense about Germany sinking never to rise again."

In August 1919 Asquith was asked to preside over a Royal Commission into the Universities of Oxford and Cambridge, although the report when it came was, in line with Asquith's own academic views, somewhat conservative. The commission began hearings in January 1920; many dons would have preferred Haldane as chair. Asquith's public rehabilitation continued with the receipt in late 1919 of the 1914 Star, the British War Medal and the Victory Medal, honours which the War Office, under Churchill, had originally intended only to be awarded to Lloyd George, until the King insisted Asquith receive them also.

Maclean and others urged Asquith to stand in the Spen Valley by-election in December 1919, but it is unclear whether he ever considered the idea. This was just as well, as it had become clear that Labour were going to fight the seat hard and they defeated Sir John Simon when Lloyd George insisted on splitting the Liberal vote by running a Coalition Liberal candidate.

=== Paisley ===
A Parliamentary seat was essential if Asquith was again to play any serious part in future events. By the autumn of 1919 J.M. Hogge was openly critical of Asquith's leadership, and by January 1920 it was rumoured that he had given Asquith an ultimatum that unless he returned to Parliament in a by-election the Independent Liberal MPs would repudiate him as their leader (had he lost a by-election, his position would have been untenable anyway, as he well knew).

In January 1920, an opportunity arose at Paisley, in Scotland like his previous seat, after the death of the Liberal MP. The Liberals had held the seat by only 106 votes in 1918. Asquith's adoption was not a foregone conclusion: the local Association was split between pro- and anti-coalition factions, and he was selected by a vote of 20:17 by the executive and then 92:75 of the wider members. He was formally adopted on 21 January 1920 and soon united the local Liberal Association behind him. Asquith was lukewarm at the thought of returning to Scotland, and regarded his gamble with trepidation, although he grew more confident as the campaign progressed. Travelling with Margot, his daughter Violet and a small staff, Asquith directed most of his campaign not against Labour, who were already in second place, but against the Coalition, calling for a less harsh line on German reparations and the Irish War of Independence. Some "thought fit to compare [the campaign] with Gladstone's Midlothian campaign, although Asquith himself was more circumspect.

The result was stupendous, with Asquith defeating his Labour opponent by a majority of over 2000 votes, with the Coalition candidate a very poor third. Violet was ecstatic: "every star in the political skies favoured Father when we left Paisley, he became there what he has never before been in his life, the 'popular' candidate, the darling of the crowd." The poll was up by 8,000 from 1918. Asquith's surprise victory was helped by the support of the press baron Lord Rothermere.

He was seen off by tumultuous crowds at Glasgow, and greeted by further crowds at Euston the next morning, and along the road on his first return to Parliament. However, he received only a chilly greeting inside the Chamber, and no personal congratulations from Coalition politicians, except from Lord Cave, who was later to defeat him for the Chancellorship of Oxford University in 1925.

=== Leader of the Opposition: 1920–1921 ===
Paisley was a false dawn, for the Liberals and for Asquith personally. Jenkins wrote that "The post-war Liberal day never achieved more than a grey and short-lived light. By 1924, it was dusk again. By 1926, for Asquith, it was political night." Maurice Cowling characterised Asquith at this time as "a dignified wreck, neither effective in the House of Commons nor attractive as a public reputation, (who) drank too much and (who) had lost touch with the movement of events and the spirit of the time."

Money, or its lack, also became an increasing concern. Margot's extravagance was legendary and Asquith was no longer earning either the legal fees or the prime ministerial salary they had enjoyed in earlier years. Additionally, there were on-going difficulties with Margot's inheritance. In 1920, as an economy measure, 20 Cavendish Square was sold to Viscountess Cowdray and Asquith and Margot moved to 44, Bedford Square.

Criticism of Asquith's weak leadership continued. Lloyd George's mistress Frances Stevenson wrote (18 March) that he was "finished ... no fight left in him"; the press baron Lord Rothermere, who had supported him at Paisley, wrote on 1 April of his "obvious incapacity for the position he is expected to fill". In fact Asquith spoke in the House of Commons far more frequently than he had ever previously done when not a minister. He also spoke frequently around the country, in June 1921 topping the Liberal Chief Whip's list of the most active speakers. The issue was the quality of his contributions. Asquith still maintained friendly relations with Lloyd George, although Margot made no secret of her enmity for him.

Until the Paisley by-election Asquith had accepted that the next government must be some kind of Liberal-Labour coalition, but Labour had distanced themselves because of his policies on the mines, the Russo-Polish War, education, the prewar secret treaties and the suppression of the Easter Rebellion. The success of Anti-Waste League candidates at by-elections made leading Liberals feel that there was a strong anti-Coalition vote which might be tapped by a wider-based and more credible opposition. By late June 1921 Asquith's leadership was still under strong attack from within the Wee Free group, although Frances Stevenson's claim in her diary that most of them now wanted Lloyd George as their leader is not corroborated by the report in The Times. Lord Robert Cecil, a moderate and pro-League of Nations Conservative, had been having talks with Edward Grey about a possible coalition, and Asquith and leading Liberals Crewe, Runciman and Maclean had a meeting with them on 5 July 1921, and two subsequent ones. Cecil wanted a genuine coalition rather than a de facto Liberal government, with Grey rather than Asquith as prime minister, but the Liberals did not, and little came of the plans.

Asquith did fiercely oppose "the hellish policy of reprisals" in Ireland, impressing the young Oswald Mosley. J.M. Hogge even urged Sir Donald Maclean (31 August) to "knock Asquith into the middle of next week" and seize back the chairmanship of the Liberal MPs. Late in 1921 the National Liberal Federation adopted an industrial programme without Asquith's agreement. On 24 October 1921 Asquith commented "if one tries to strike a bold true note half one's friends shiver and cower, and implore one not to get in front of the band".

=== Leader of the Opposition: 1922 ===
In January 1922 C.P. Scott of the Manchester Guardian told Asquith that he supported a centre-left grouping, but only if moderate Labour was included—in reality Labour leaders were unable to deliver the support of their local members for such a realignment. Asquith achieved more success with a major speech at Westminster Central Hall in January 1922, in reply to a speech by Lloyd George a few days earlier. Asquith had with some difficulty been persuaded to make the maximum possible reference to his renewed alliance with Grey, but Haldane had refused to join the platform. Five days later Churchill replied with a pro-Coalition speech in which he accused Asquith and other Liberals of having "stood carefully aside" during the war, causing deep offence. (Note: Churchill's wife remonstrated with him that Asquith had seen his sons killed and maimed. Churchill replied that Asquith had left him to be a scapegoat over the Dardanelles, had refused to appoint him Commander-in-Chief in East Africa or to give him the brigade command on the Western Front which he had promised him at the end of 1915, or to appoint him to the vacancy for Minister of Munitions in the summer of 1916. Asquith re-established friendly relations with Churchill after they were sat together at the wedding of the Duke of York and Elizabeth Bowes-Lyon, writing of him as Chancellor of the Exchequer in 1925 that he was "a Chimborazo or Everest among the sandhills of the Baldwin Cabinet".)

By the summer of 1922 Asquith's interest in politics was at a very low ebb. He was observed to be very heavily drunk and was helped up the stairs by Lloyd George at a party of Sir Philip Sassoon's on 16 July 1922. His reputation was further damaged by his portrayal in Aldous Huxley's novel Crome Yellow and by the publication of the first volume of Margot's memoirs, which sold well in the UK and the United States, but were thought an undignified way for a former prime minister to make money. On 13 September 1922 Sir Donald Maclean told Harold Laski that Asquith was devoted to bridge and small talk and did not do enough real work. Asquith was increasingly attracted by the thought of making money from writing, with Churchill doing very well from his The World Crisis and Lloyd George rumoured to be being paid handsomely for his memoirs (which in the event did not appear until the mid-1930s). Asquith's books The Genesis of the War finally appeared in September 1923 and Studies and Sketches in 1924. His second son Herbert recorded, "A large part of my father's later years was occupied with authorship and it was during this period that he wrote most of his longer books."

Asquith played no part in Lloyd George's fall from power in October 1922, which happened because the rank-and-file majority of his Conservative coalition partners, led by Stanley Baldwin and Lloyd George's former colleague Law, deserted him. Law formed a purely Conservative government, and the following month, at the 1922 general election, Asquith ceased to be Leader of the Opposition as more Labour MPs were elected than the two Liberal factions combined. 138 Labour members outnumbered the combined Liberal number of 117, with 60 Asquith supporters and 57 "National Liberals" (adherents to Lloyd George). Asquith had thought Paisley would be safe but was only narrowly returned with a 316 majority (50.5 per cent of the votes cast in a two-candidate battle with Labour), despite a rise in the Liberal vote. He put this down to the 5,000 unemployed at Paisley after the slump of 1920–1921. He wrote that he "gloated" over the senior Coalition Liberals—Churchill, Hamar Greenwood, Freddie Guest and Edwin Montagu—who lost their seats.

=== Liberal reunion ===
In March 1923 a petition for reunion among Liberal backbenchers received 73 signatures, backed by the Lloyd Georgeite Daily Chronicle and the Asquithian Liberal Magazine. But reunion was opposed by senior Asquithian Liberals like Sir John Simon, Viscount Gladstone and Charles Masterman, and as late as 30 June by journalists such as H. W. Massingham and Gardiner of The Nation. Viscount Gladstone felt that "it was generally recognised that Asquith was no longer effective as an active leader" but that Lloyd George must not succeed him. By July Asquith was superficially friendly to Lloyd George and consulted him, but he did not include him in the Shadow Cabinet. (Note: Koss observes that this was not without recent precedent, as Campbell-Bannerman had sometimes excluded Asquith and the other Liberal Imperialists at the time of the Boer War.) Asquith wanted Lloyd George to make the first move but although the latter put out feelers to senior Asquith supporters he insisted that he was "neither a suppliant nor a penitent". M.S.R. Kinnear writes that Asquith felt that with Lloyd George's faction declining in strength he had everything to gain by waiting, while too quick an approach would antagonise the Labour leaders who hated Lloyd George and whose support he might need for a future Lib-Lab coalition. Kinnear also argues that Asquith's "gloating" over the defeat of Coalition Liberals in 1922 is evidence that "the most important factor influencing Asquith against quick reunion was his personal dislike of Lloyd George and his desire for vengeance."

The political situation was transformed when Baldwin, now prime minister, came out in favour of Protection at Plymouth on 22 October 1923. Coming out for Free Trade himself, Lloyd George was obliged, at least formally, to submit to Asquith's leadership. Parliament was dissolved. Asquith and Lloyd George reached agreement on 13 November, followed by a Free Trade manifesto, followed by a more general one. Lloyd George, accompanied by his daughter Megan, came to Paisley to speak in Asquith's support on 24 November.

Asquith fought an energetic national campaign on free trade in 1923, with echoes of 1903. He spoke at Nottingham and Manchester, but did not privately expect more than 200 Liberals to be elected—although he hoped to overtake Labour and become Leader of the Opposition once again—and hoped for Baldwin to win by a tiny majority.

The poll at Paisley was split by an independent extreme socialist and a Conservative. Asquith won with 33.4 per cent of the vote. Nationally, the outcome of the election in December 1923 was a hung Parliament (258 Conservatives, 191 Labour, 158 Liberals); the Liberals had gained seats but were still in third place. A quarter of the seats were held by majority less than 1,000. In general, Asquith Liberals did better than Lloyd George Liberals, which Gladstone and Maclean saw as a reason to prevent close co-operation between the factions.

=== Putting Labour in power ===
There was no question of the Liberals supporting a continuation of the Conservative government, not least as it was feared that an alliance of the two "bourgeois" parties would antagonise Labour. Asquith commented that "If a Labour Government is ever to be tried in this country, as it will be sooner or later, it could hardly be tried under safer conditions". Asquith's decision to support a minority Labour Government was seconded by Lloyd George and approved by a party meeting on 18 December.

Baldwin's view was similar, as he rejected Sir Robert Horne's scheme for a Conservative-Liberal pact. Roy Douglas called the decision to put in Ramsay MacDonald "the most disastrous single action ever performed by a Liberal towards his party." Other historians such as Trevor Wilson and Koss reject this view, arguing that Asquith had little choice.

Asquith was never in doubt as to the correctness of his approach, although a deluge of correspondence urged him to save the country from Socialism. He wrote on 28 December "I have been intreated during these weeks, cajoled, wheedled, almost caressed, tortured, threatened, brow-beaten and all but blackmailed to step in as the saviour of society."

The Liberals thus supported Britain's first ever (minority) Labour Government under Ramsay MacDonald. The Liberal Party voted for the Labour amendment to the Address, causing Baldwin to resign (Asquith believed that Baldwin could have ignored the vote and carried on attempting to govern without a majority). He thought the new Labour Government "a beggarly array" although he remarked that the Foreign Office staff were glad to see the back of "the Archduke Curzon". Asquith believed that MacDonald would soon be discredited both in the eyes of the country and of his own more extreme supporters, and the Liberal revival would continue.

=== Labour government and the Campbell Case ===
Asquith's decision only hastened his party's destruction, the Conservative Austen Chamberlain writing to his colleague Sir Samuel Hoare, "We have got (unexpectedly and by our own blunders and Asquith's greater folly) a second chance. Have we got the wit to take it?"

Relations with Labour soon became very tense, with Liberal MPs increasingly angered at having to support a Labour Government which treated them with such open hostility. Many Liberals were also angered at MacDonald's pursuit of a trade agreement with the Soviet Union, although Asquith rather less so. The intervention of a Labour candidate at a by-election in Oxford in June handed the seat to the Conservatives.

As Asquith brought MacDonald in so, later in the same year, he had significant responsibility for forcing him out over the Campbell Case and the Russian Treaty. The Conservatives proposed a vote of censure against the Government for withdrawing their prosecution for sedition against the Daily Worker, and Asquith moved an amendment calling for a select committee (the same tactic he had employed over the Marconi scandal and the Maurice Debate). Asquith's contribution to the debate showed an increasingly rare return to Parliamentary form. "Almost every one of his delightful sentences filled the Chamber with laughter." Asquith's motion was passed by 364–198. As in the Maurice Debate, his sense of political tactics was, in Jenkins' view, overcome by his sense of Parliamentary propriety. He could not bring himself to withdraw the amendment, but could not support the government either.

=== 1924 election ===
Instead of resigning MacDonald requested, and was granted, a General Election. The 1924 election was intended by MacDonald to cripple the Liberals, and it did. Lloyd George refused to hand over money from his fund until he had more say over the Liberal whips office, Liberal Party Headquarters at Arlington Street and an election there was a chance of winning.

Meetings at Paisley were tumultuous and Asquith was barracked by hecklers singing "The Red Flag". Asquith was widely expected to lose his seat and did so by 2,228. He received 46.5 per cent of the vote in his final parliamentary election, a straight fight against Labour. Violet wrote, "Father was absolutely controlled. He just said to me, 'I'm out by 2,000'."

It was a political, as well as a personal, disaster. Baldwin won a landslide victory, with over "400 Conservatives returned and only 40 Liberals", far behind Labour which entrenched its position as the "chief party of Opposition." Labour's vote actually increased somewhat (partly as a result of their fielding more candidates than before). The Liberal vote collapsed, much of it coalescing to the Conservatives as a result of the scare around the forged Zinoviev Letter.

The Liberal grandees, who hated Lloyd George, did not press Asquith to retire. Sir Robert Hudson and Maclean called on him (31 October) and insisted he firmly keep the chair at the next meeting and nominate the new Chief Whip himself.

=== Elevation ===
The 1924 election was Asquith's last Parliamentary campaign, and there was no realistic chance of a return to the Commons. He told Charles Masterman "I'd sooner go to hell than to Wales," the only part of the country where Liberal support remained strong. The King offered him a peerage (4 November 1924). Asquith felt he was not rich enough to accept, and would have preferred to die a commoner like William Pitt the Younger or Gladstone. He accepted in January 1925 after a holiday in Egypt with his son Arthur. He deliberately chose the title "Earl of Oxford", saying it had a splendid history as the title chosen by Robert Harley, a Tory statesman of Queen Anne's reign. He was thought by some to have delusions of grandeur, Lady Salisbury writing to him that the title was "like a suburban villa calling itself Versailles." Asquith found the controversy amusing but the College of Heralds insisted that he add "and Asquith" to the final title, after protests from Harley's family. In practice he was known as "Lord Oxford". He never enjoyed the Lords, and thought the quality of debates there poor.

In 1924 the Liberal Party had only been able to put up 343 candidates due to lack of money. At one point the Liberal Shadow Cabinet suggested obtaining the opinion of a Chancery Lawyer as to whether the Liberal Party was entitled under trust law to Lloyd George's money, which he had obtained from the sale of honours. On 29 January 1925, at a two-day London convention, Asquith launched a Million Fund Appeal in an unsuccessful attempt to raise Liberal Party funds independent of Lloyd George.

=== Oxford University chancellor election ===
I have had a noble offer from Lady Breadalbane who proposes to give me her late husband's Garter robes as a present. I shall jump at this, as it will save me a lot of money.

— Asquith on an additional benefit of The Order of the Garter

One more disappointment remained. In 1925 he stood for the Chancellorship of Oxford University, vacant on the death of Lord Curzon. He was eminently suited and was described by Lord Birkenhead, one of his many Conservative supporters, as "the greatest living Oxonian."

Asquith suspected he might lose because of country clergy's hostility to Welsh Disestablishment, blaming "Zadok the Priest and Abiathar the Priest—with their half-literate followers in the rural parsonages". The election was also seen as a settling of party scores and a mockery of his title. He lost to the Conservative candidate, Lord Cave, by 987 votes to 441 on 20 March. He claimed to be "more disappointed than surprised", but his friend Desmond MacCarthy wrote that it affected him "more than any disappointment, save one, in his life after he ceased to be Prime Minister."

On 17 March 1925 Asquith was appointed to the Judicial Committee of the Privy Council, and in May 1925 he accepted the Order of the Garter from Baldwin, who was known to be a personal admirer of his.

=== Resignation ===
Difficulties continued with Lloyd George, who had been chairman of the Liberal MPs since 1924, over the party leadership and over party funds. In the autumn of 1925 Hobhouse, Runciman and the industrialist Sir Alfred Mond protested to Asquith at Lloyd George organising his own campaign for reform of land ownership. Asquith was "not enthusiastic" but Lloyd George ignored him and arranged for Asquith to be sent reports and calculations ("Lord Oxford likes sums" he wrote). At a meeting on 25 November 1925 Grey, Maclean, Simon, Gladstone and Runciman urged Asquith to have a showdown with Lloyd George over money. Asquith wanted to think it over, and at the December 1925 Federation executive he left the meeting before the topic came up. To the horror of his followers Asquith reached an agreement in principle with Lloyd George over land reform on 2 December, then together they presented plans to the National Liberal Federation on 26 February 1926. But, wrote Maclean, "in private Asquith's language about Lloyd George was lurid."

In January 1926 Mond withdrew his financial support from the Liberal Party. The loss of wealthy donors and the failure of the Million Fund Appeal further weakened Asquith's position, and there is some evidence that his frequent requests for money irritated donors like Sir Robert Perks who had given a good deal to the Party over the years, and that outside his inner circle of devotees he was bad at keeping on good terms with potential donors.

This was followed by a near final breach with Lloyd George over the General Strike. The Liberal Shadow Cabinet unequivocally backed Baldwin's handling of the strike on 3 May. Asquith viewed the strike as "criminal folly" and condemned it in the House of Lords, whilst in the Commons Sir John Simon declared it to be illegal. But whereas Asquith and Grey both contributed to the British Gazette, Churchill's pro-government newssheet, Lloyd George, who had not previously expressed a contrary opinion at Shadow Cabinet, wrote an article for the American press more sympathetic to the strikers, and did not attend the Shadow Cabinet on 10 May, sending his apologies on "policy grounds". Asquith at first assumed him to be trying to ingratiate himself with the churches and Labour, but then (20 May) sent him a public letter rebuking him for not attending the meeting to discuss his opinions with colleagues in private.

In private, both sides were incandescent; one of Asquith's colleagues describing him as "far more indignant at L.G. than I have ever seen", whilst Lloyd George expressed his private feelings in a letter to Frances Stevenson on 24 May "(Asquith) is a silly old man drunk with hidden conceit. When he listens to those poor creatures he has a weakness for gathering around him he generally makes a fool of himself. They are really 'beat'. Dirty dogs—and bitches."

Lloyd George's letter of 10 May had not been published, making it appear that Asquith had fired the first shot, and Lloyd George sent a moderate public reply, on 25 May. Asquith then wrote another public letter (1 June) stating that he regarded Lloyd George's behaviour as tantamount to resignation, the same as if a Cabinet Minister had refused to abide by the principle of collective responsibility. Twelve leading Liberals (including Grey, Lord Buckmaster, Simon, Maclean and Runciman) wrote in Asquith's support to The Times (1 June). However, Lloyd George had more support amongst the wider party than amongst the grandees. The executive of the National Liberal Federation, despite backing Asquith by 16:8, had already urged a reconciliation in late May, and the London Liberal Candidates' Association (3 June) and the Liberal MPs (8 June) did the same. Asquith had planned to launch a fightback at the National Liberal Federation in Weston-super-Mare, due on 17 June, but on the eve of the conference he suffered a stroke (12 June) which put him out of action for three months.

Margot is said to have later claimed that her husband regretted the breach and had acted after several rich donors had threatened to quit. Asquith finally resigned the Liberal leadership on 15 October 1926.

== Final years: 1926–1928 ==
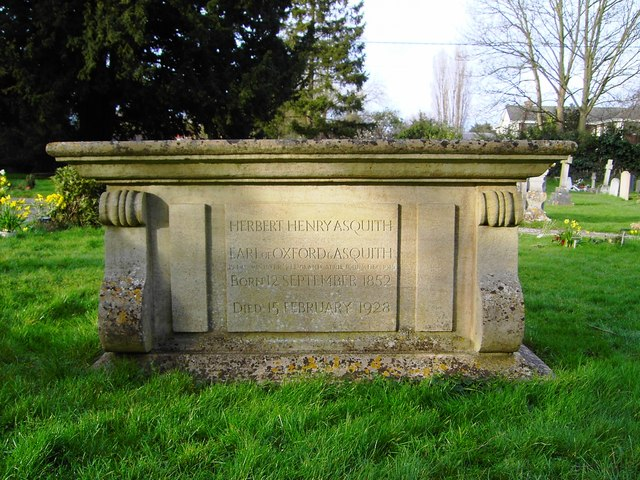
Asquith's grave at Sutton Courtenay

Asquith filled his retirement with reading, writing, a little golf, travelling and meeting with friends. Since 1918 he had developed an interest in modern painting and sculpture.

His health remained reasonable, almost to the end, though financial concerns increasingly beset him. A perhaps surprising contributor to an endowment fund established to support Asquith in 1927 was Lord Beaverbrook (the former Max Aitken), who contributed £1,000. Violet was highly embarrassed by her step-mother's attempts to enlist the aid of Aitken, Lord Reading and others of her husband's friends and acquaintances. "It is monstrous that other people (should) be made to foot Margot's bridge bills. How she has dragged his name through the mud!"

Asquith suffered a second stroke in January 1927, disabling his left leg for a while and leaving him a wheelchair-user for the spring and early summer of 1927. Asquith's last visit was to see the widowed Venetia Montagu in Norfolk. On his return to The Wharf, in autumn 1927, he was unable to get out of his car without help and "he was never again able to go upstairs to his own room." He suffered a third stroke at the end of 1927. His last months were difficult, and he became increasingly confused, his daughter Violet writing, "To watch Father's glorious mind breaking up and sinking—like a great ship—is a pain beyond all my imagining."

== Death ==
Asquith died, aged 75, at The Wharf on the morning of 15 February 1928. "He was buried, at his own wish, with great simplicity," in the churchyard of All Saints' at Sutton Courtenay, his gravestone recording his name, title, and the dates of his birth and death. A blue plaque records his long residence at 20 Cavendish Square and a memorial tablet was subsequently erected in Westminster Abbey. Viscount Grey, with Haldane Asquith's oldest political friend, wrote, "I have felt (his) death very much: it is true that his work was done but we were very close together for so many years. I saw the beginning of his Parliamentary life; and to witness the close is the end of a long chapter of my own."

Asquith's will was proved on 9 June 1928, with his estate amounting to £9345 9s. 2d. (roughly equivalent to £507,581 in 2025).

== Descendants ==
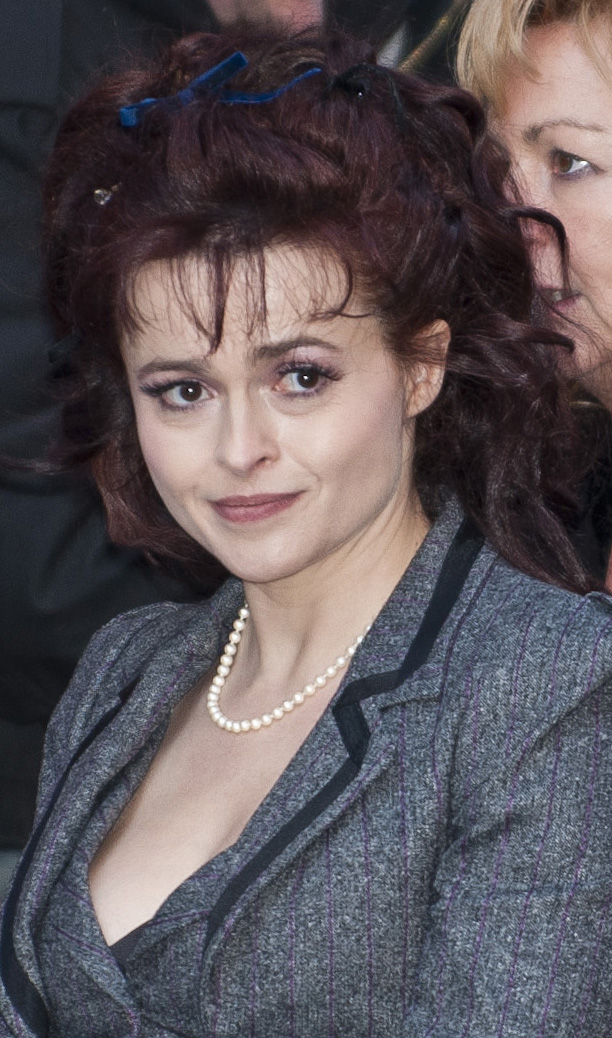
Asquith's great-granddaughter, the actress Helena Bonham Carter

Asquith had five children by his first wife, Helen, and two surviving children (three others died at birth or in infancy) by his second wife, Margot.

His eldest son, Raymond, after an academic career that outstripped his father's, was killed at the Somme in 1916. His second son, Herbert (1881–1947), became a writer and poet and married Cynthia Charteris. His later life was marred by alcoholism. His third son, Arthur (1883–1939), became a soldier and businessman. His only daughter by his first wife, Violet, later Violet Bonham Carter (1887–1969), became a well-regarded writer and a life peeress as Baroness Asquith of Yarnbury. She married Asquith's Personal Private Secretary Maurice Bonham Carter in 1915. His fourth son, Cyril (1890–1954), was born on the day Asquith became a QC and later became a Law Lord.

His two children by Margot were Elizabeth, later Princess Antoine Bibesco (1897–1945), a writer, who also struggled with alcohol, and Anthony Asquith (1902–1968), known as "Puffin", a filmmaker, whose life was also severely affected by alcoholism.

Among his living descendants are his great-granddaughter, the actress Helena Bonham Carter (born 1966), and two great-grandsons, Dominic Asquith, a former British High Commissioner to India, and Raymond Asquith, 3rd Earl of Oxford and Asquith, who inherited Asquith's earldom. Another leading British actress, Anna Chancellor (born 1965), is Asquith's great-great-granddaughter on her mother's side.

== Assessment ==
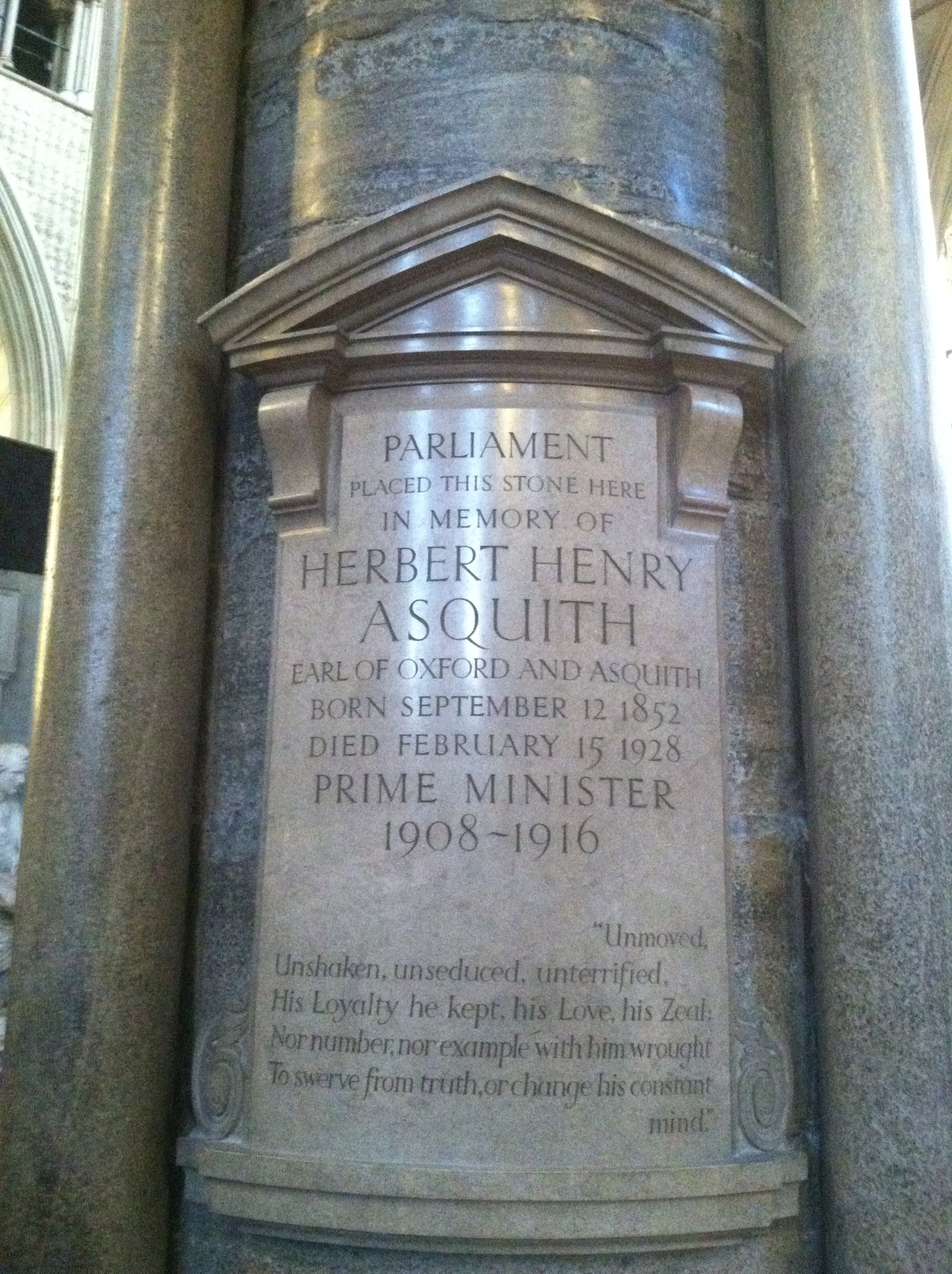
Memorial to Asquith, Westminster Abbey

According to Matthew, "Asquith's decision for war with Germany was the most important taken by a British prime minister in the twentieth century, and was more important than any prime ministerial decision of the nineteenth century. It not only dictated the involvement of the United Kingdom in war but affected much of the pattern of imperial, foreign, and economic history for the rest of the century." Matthew deemed the decision Asquith's, in that without prime ministerial support, it was not likely Britain would have entered the war. Given the deep divisions in the Liberal Party, Pearce and Goodlad said "it was a measure of [Asquith's] skill that he took Britain into the war with only two relatively minor Cabinet ministers ... choosing to resign".

Asquith's reputation will always be heavily influenced by his downfall at the height of the First World War. In 1970 Basil Liddell Hart summed up opinion as to the reasons for his fall: "Lloyd George [came to] power as the spokesman for a widespread demand for a more vigorous as well as a more efficient prosecution of the war." Asquith's collegiate approach; his tendency to "wait and see"; his stance as the chairman of the cabinet, rather than leader of a government—"content to preside without directing"; his "contempt for the press, regard[ing] journalists as ignorant, spiteful and unpatriotic"; and his weakness for alcohol—"I had occasion to speak to the P.M. twice yesterday and on both occasions I was nearly gassed by the alcoholic fumes he discharged"; all contributed to a prevailing sense that Asquith was unable to rise to "the necessities of total warfare." Grigg concludes, "In certain vital respects, he was not qualified to run the war. A great head of government in peacetime, by the end of 1916 he was in a general state of decline, his obvious defects as a war leader [exposed]."

Cassar, reflecting on Asquith's work to bring a united country to war, and his efforts in the year thereafter, goes towards a reassessment: "His achievements are sufficiently impressive to earn him a place as one of the outstanding figures of the Great War". His contemporary opponent Lord Birkenhead paid tribute to his bringing Britain united into the War, "A statesman who rendered great service to his country at a time when no other living Englishman could have done what he did." The Coalition Whip, William Bridgeman, provided an alternative Conservative view, comparing Lloyd George to Asquith at the time of the latter's fall: "[H]owever unpopular or mistrusted [Lloyd George] was in the House, he carried much more weight in the Country than Asquith, who was almost everywhere looked on as a lazy and dilatory man." Gary Sheffield and John Bourne provide a recent historical reassessment: "Asquith's governments arguably took all the key decisions of the War: the decision to intervene, to send the BEF; to raise a mass volunteer army; to start and end the Gallipoli Campaign; the creation of a Coalition government; the mobilisation of industry; the introduction of conscription." The weight of opinion continues to agree with Asquith's own candid assessment, in a letter written in the midst of war in July 1916: "I am [as usual] encompassed by a cloud of worries, anxieties, problems and the rest. 'The time is out of joint' and sometimes I am tempted to say with Hamlet 'O cursed spite, that ever I was born to set it right.' Perhaps I wasn't."

Asquith's fall also saw the end of the "Liberal Party as one of the great parties of state." According to Koss, Asquith's memory, "has lingered over the successive crises that continued to afflict his party. Each glimmer of a Liberal revival has enhanced his historical stature, if only as the victim or agent of the Liberal decline." After 1922 the Liberals did not hold office again, except as junior partners in coalition governments in 1931–1932, in 1940–1945, (Note: The Liberal Nationals, a breakaway faction led by Asquith's former protégé Sir John Simon were in coalition throughout the 1931–1945 period and eventually merged with the Conservatives.) and (as today's Liberal Democrats) in 2010–2015. Leonard considers that responsibility for this must also be carried, in part, by Asquith, "this gifted, fastidious, proud yet ultimately indecisive man must bear his share of the blame."

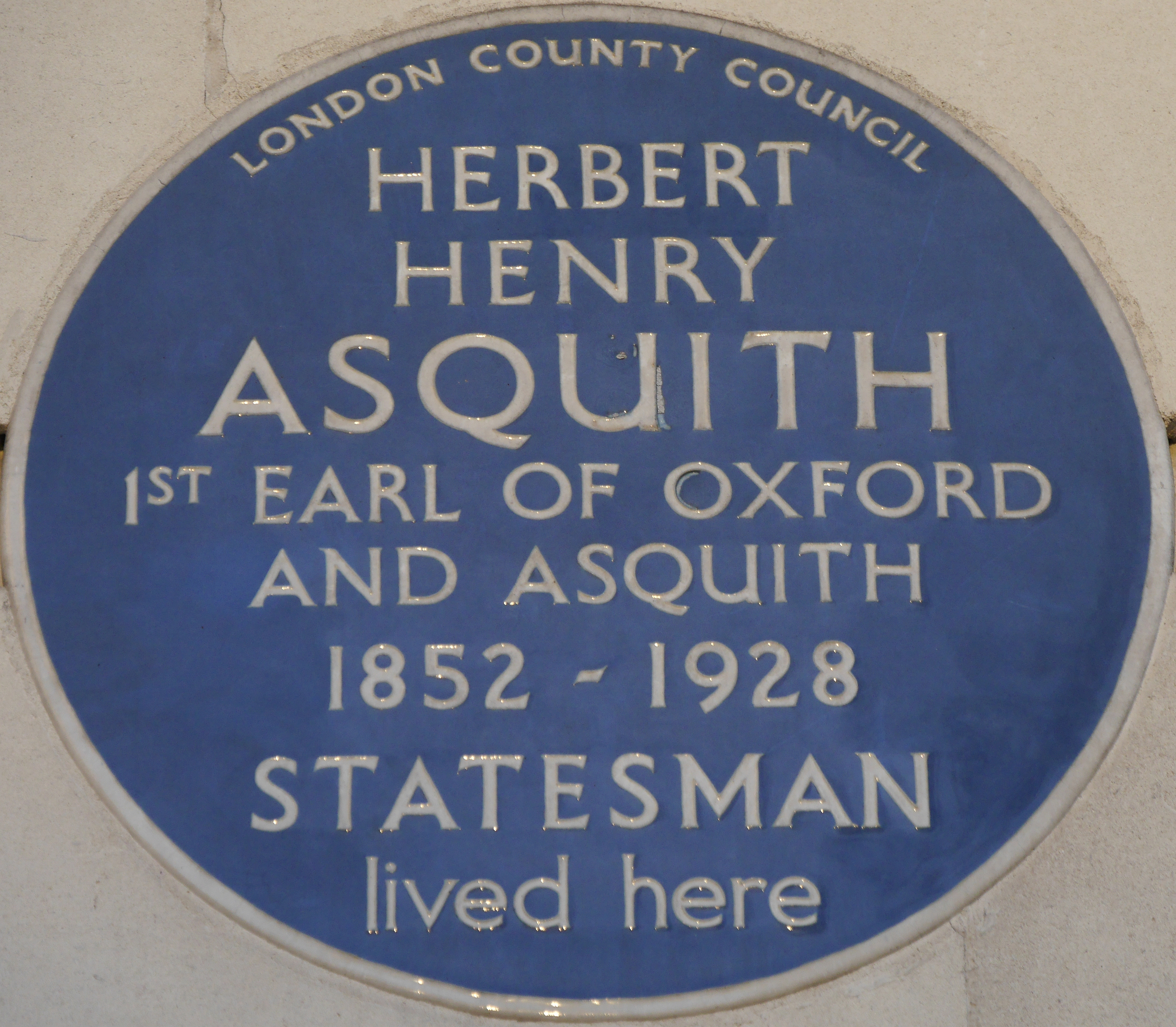
Blue plaque, 20 Cavendish Square, London

Koss concludes that, in a "long, eventful and complex career, [that] does not admit easily of a summing up, Asquith's failings were no less manifest than his achievements." Michael and Eleanor Brock maintain that "his peacetime record of legislative achievement should not be overshadowed by his wartime inadequacy." Of those achievements, his colleague Lord Buckmaster wrote, "The dull senses and heavy lidded eyes of the public prevent them from seeing now all that you have accomplished, but history will record it and the accomplishment is vast." Among his greatest domestic accomplishments, reform of the House of Lords is at the zenith. Yet Asquith's premiership was also marked by many difficulties, leading McKenna to write in his memoirs, "friends began to wonder whether the highest statesmanship consisted of overcoming one crisis by creating another". Hazlehurst, writing in 1970, felt there was still much to be gleaned from a critical review of Asquith's peacetime premiership, "certainly, the record of a prime minister under whom the nation goes to the brink of civil war [over Ireland] must be subjected to the severest scrutiny."

Perhaps Asquith's greatest personal attainment was his parliamentary dominance. From his earliest days in the House, "he spoke with the authority of a leader and not as a backbencher." As Campbell-Bannerman's "sledgehammer", his "debating power was unequalled." Lord Curzon extolled his skill in parliamentary dialectic: "Whenever I have heard him on a first-rate occasion, there rises in my mind the image of some great military parade. The words, the arguments, the points, follow each other with the steady tramp of regiments across the field; each unit is in its place, the whole marching in rhythmical order; the sunshine glints on the bayonets and ever, and anon, is heard the roll of the drums."

Jenkins considered Asquith as foremost amongst the great social reforming premiers of the twentieth century. His Government's social and political reforms were unprecedented and far-sighted, "paving the way for the welfare state legislation of the Attlee government in 1945–1951 as well as Blair's constitutional reforms after 1997." According to Roy Hattersley, a changed Britain entered the war in 1914, "the political, social and cultural revolution had already happened. Modern Britain was born in the opening years of the twentieth century." Asquith also worked strenuously to secure a settlement of the Irish question and, although unsuccessful, his work contributed to the 1922 settlement. Lastly, as a "great head of a Cabinet", Asquith directed and developed the talents of an extraordinary array of parliamentarians, for an extraordinarily long period. Hazlehurst contends that this "ability to keep so gifted and divergently-inclined a group in harness (was) one of his major achievements."

Overall, the Brocks argue that "on the basis of his achievements 1908 to 1914 he must rank among the greatest British statesmen of any era." His oldest political and personal friend, Haldane, wrote to Asquith on the latter's final resignation: "My Dear A., a time has come in both of our lives when the bulk of work has been done. That work does not pass away. It is not by overt signs that its enduring character is to be judged. It is by the changes made in the spirit of things into which the work has entered."

== Arms ==
Coat of arms of H.H. Asquith, 1st Earl of Oxford and Asquith
Crest Issuant out of clouds proper, a mascle gules. Escutcheon Sable, on a fesse between three cross-crosslets argent a portcullis of the field. Supporters On either side a lion purpure, charged on the shoulder with an open book argent, edged or. Motto Sine macula macla (Stained without stain). Orders The Most Noble Order of the Garter (Knight Companion)

== See also ==
- Liberalism in the United Kingdom

== Sources ==
- Adams, R. J. Q. (1997). "Andrew Bonar Law and the fall of the Asquith Coalition: The December 1916 cabinet crisis". Canadian Journal of History. 32 (2): 185–200. doi:10.3138/cjh.32.2.185.
- Adams, R. J. Q. (1999). Bonar Law. London: John Murray. ISBN 978-0-7195-5422-3.
- Adelman, Paul (1995). The Decline of the Liberal Party, 1910–1931. London: Longman. ISBN 978-0-582-27733-5.
- Alderson, J. P. (1905). Mr. Asquith. London: Methuen. OCLC 1107438.
- Bates, Stephen (2006). Asquith. London: Haus. ISBN 978-1-904950-57-8.
- Lord Beaverbrook (1960). Politicians and the war, 1914–1916. London: Collins. OCLC 400531.
- Lord Birkenhead (1924). Contemporary Personalities. London: Cassell & Co. OCLC 1308320.
- Bonham Carter, Violet (1999). Pottle, Mark (ed.). Champion Redoubtable: The Diaries and Letters of Violet Bonham Carter 1914–1945. London: Weidenfeld & Nicolson. ISBN 978-0-7538-0546-6.
- Bridgeman, William (1988). Williamson, Philip (ed.). The Modernisation of Conservative Politics: The Diaries and Letters of William Bridgeman, 1904–1935. London: The Historians' Press. ISBN 978-0-9508900-4-3.
- Campbell, John (1983). F. E. Smith, First Earl of Birkenhead. London: Jonathan Cape. ISBN 978-0-224-01596-7.
- Cartwright, Anthony C. (2016). The British Pharmacopoeia, 1864 to 2014: Medicines, International Standards and the State. Routledge. ISBN 978-1472420329.
- Cassar, George (1994). Asquith as War Leader. London: Hutchinson. ISBN 978-1-85285-117-0.
- Chamberlain, Austen (1935). Down The Years. London: Cassell & Co. OCLC 1674665.
- Chisholm, Anne; Michael, Davie (1992). Beaverbrook: A Life. London: Hutchinson. ISBN 978-0-394-56879-9.
- Churchill, Winston (1938). The World Crisis 1911–1918 Volume 2. London: Odhams Press. OCLC 4739262.
- Clifford, Colin (2002). The Asquiths. London: John Murray. ISBN 978-0-7195-5457-5.
- Cooper, Duff (2005). Norwich, John Julius (ed.). The Duff Cooper Diaries. London: Weidenfeld & Nicolson. ISBN 978-0-297-84843-1.
- Cowling, Maurice (1971). The Impact of Labour 1920–1924. London: Cambridge University Press. ISBN 978-0-521-07969-3. OCLC 126150.
- de Courcy, Anne (2014). Margot at War: Love and Betrayal in Downing Street, 1912–1916. London: Weidenfeld & Nicolson. ISBN 978-0-297-86983-2. OCLC 909289608.
- Douglas, Roy (2005). The Liberals: The History of the Liberal and Liberal Democrat Parties. London and New York: Hambledon and London. ISBN 978-1-85285-353-2.
- Dutton, David (1985). Austen Chamberlain: Gentleman in Politics. Bolton: Ross Anderson Publications. ISBN 978-0-86360-030-2. "editions:wYXZBk7a4uQC."
- Egremont, Max (1998). Balfour – A Life of Arthur James Balfour. London: Phoenix. ISBN 978-0-7538-0146-8.
- Ekwall, Eilert (1960). Concise Oxford Dictionary of English Place-names. Oxford: Oxford University Press. ISBN 978-0-19-869103-7.
- Fry, Michael (September 1988). "Political Change in Britain, August 1914 to December 1916: Lloyd George Replaces Asquith: The Issues Underlying the Drama". The Historical Journal. 31 (3). Cambridge University Press: 609–627. doi:10.1017/S0018246X00023517. JSTOR 2639759. S2CID 153441235.
- Gilbert, Martin (1971). Winston S. Churchill Volume III 1914–1916. London: Heinemann. ISBN 9780395131534. OCLC 1158303.
- Friedlaender, Heinrich E.; Oser, Jacob (1953). Economic History of Modern Europe. New York: Prentice Hall Inc.
- Gilbert, Martin (1972). Winston S. Churchill Companion Volume III Part 2 May 1915 – December 1916. London: Heinemann. OCLC 870699758.
- Gilbert, Martin (1995). First World War. London: Harper Collins. ISBN 978-0-00-637666-8.
- Gilmour, David (1994). Curzon: Imperial Statesman. London: Macmillan. ISBN 978-0-374-53024-2.
- Grey, Sir Edward (1925). Twenty-Five Years: 1892–1916 Volume II. London: Hodder & Stoughton. OCLC 5794156.
- Grigg, John (1985). Lloyd George: From Peace to War 1912–1916. London: Methuen. ISBN 978-0-413-46660-0.
- Grigg, John (2002). Lloyd George: War Leader 1916–1918. London: Allen Lane. ISBN 978-0-7139-9343-1.
- Haig, Douglas (2006). Sheffield, Gary; Bourne, John (eds.). Douglas Haig: War Diaries and Letters 1914–1918. London: Phoenix. ISBN 978-0-7538-2075-9.
- Haldane, Richard Burdon (1929). An Autobiography. London: Hodder and Stoughton. OCLC 400640. "Richard Burdon Haldane An Autobiography."
- Hastings, Max (2013). Catastrophe: Europe Goes To War 1914. London: William Collins. ISBN 978-0-00-751974-3.
- Hattersley, Roy (2005). The Edwardians. New York: St. Martin's Press. ISBN 978-0-312-34012-4.
- Hazlehurst, Cameron (1970). "Asquith as Prime Minister, 1908–1916". English Historical Review. pp. 502–531. JSTOR 563193.
- Hobhouse, Charles (1977). David, Edward (ed.). Inside Asquith's Cabinet: From the Diaries of Charles Hobhouse. London: John Murray. ISBN 978-0-7195-3387-7.
- Heffer, Simon (1998). Power and Place: the Political Consequences of King Edward VII. Weidenfeld & Nicolson. ISBN 978-0-297-84220-0.
- Huddleston, John (1989). The Search for a Just Society. George Ronald. ISBN 978-0853982883.
- Jenkins, Roy (1964). Asquith (first ed.). London: Collins. OCLC 243906913.; online
- Koss, Stephen (1985). Asquith. London: Hamish Hamilton. ISBN 978-0-231-06155-1.
- Lee, Arthur (1974). Clark, Alan (ed.). A Good Innings: The Private Papers of Viscount Lee of Fareham. London: John Murray. ISBN 978-0-7195-2850-7. OCLC 1090793.
- Leonard, Dick (2005). A Century of Premiers: Salisbury to Blair. Basingstoke: Palgrave Macmillan. ISBN 978-1-4039-3990-6.
- Levine, Naomi (1991). Politics, Religion and Love: the story of H. H. Asquith, Venetia Stanley and Edwin Montagu. New York: New York University Press. ISBN 978-0-8147-5057-5.
- Liddell Hart, Basil (1970). History of the First World War. London: Macmillan. ISBN 978-0-304-93653-3.
- Lindsay, David (1984). Vincent, John (ed.). The Crawford Papers: The journals of David Lindsay, twenty-seventh Earl of Crawford and tenth Earl of Balcarres 1871–1940 during the years 1892 to 1940. Manchester: Manchester University Press. ISBN 978-0-7190-0948-8.
- Lloyd George, David (1933). War Memoirs: Volume I. London: Ivor Nicholson and Watson. OCLC 422190936.
- Lloyd George, David (1933). War Memoirs: Volume II. London: Ivor Nicholson and Watson. OCLC 422190936.
- McEwen, John M. (November 1972). "The Liberal Party and the Irish Question during the First World War". Journal of British Studies. 12 (1): 109–131. doi:10.1086/385636. JSTOR 175330. S2CID 145766753.
- McEwen, J. M. (Fall 1978). "The Struggle For Mastery in Britain: Lloyd George Versus Asquith, December 1916". Journal of British Studies. 18 (1): 131–156. doi:10.1086/385732. S2CID 144378217.
- McEwen, J. M. "The Press and the Fall of Asquith." Historical Journal 21#4 (1978), pp. 863–83. online
- McGill, Barry. "Asquith’s Predicament, 1914-1918." Journal of Modern History 39#3 (1967), pp. 283–303. online
- Magnus, Philip (1964). King Edward The Seventh. London: John Murray. ISBN 978-0-14-002658-0.
- Marquand, David (1997). Ramsay MacDonald. London: Richard Cohen Books. ISBN 978-1-86066-113-6.
- Marriott, J. A. R. Modern England, 1885–1945 (1948) pp 275–390 on Asquith as prime minister. online
- Middlemas, Keith; Barnes, John (1969). Baldwin. London: Weidenfeld & Nicolson. ISBN 9780297178590. OCLC 60633. "baldwin middlemas barnes."
- Mulligan, William (2010). The Origins of the First World War. Cambridge, England: Cambridge University Press. ISBN 978-0-521-88633-8.
- Lord Newton (1941). Retrospection. London: John Murray. OCLC 1741622.
- Pearce, Robert; Goodlad, Graham (2013). British Prime Ministers from Balfour to Brown. London: Routledge. ISBN 978-0-415-66983-2.
- Pope-Hennessy, James (1955). Lord Crewe 1858–1945: The Likeness of a Liberal. London: Constable & Co. OCLC 917741.
- Popplewell, Oliver (2014). The Prime Minister and His Mistress. Raleigh, US: Lulu Press. ISBN 978-1-4834-1429-4.
- Pound, Reginald; Harmsworth, Geoffrey (1959). Northcliffe. London: Cassell. OCLC 655815144. "northcliffe pound and harmsworth."
- Ramsden, John (1978). A History of the Conservative Party – The Age of Balfour and Baldwin: 1902–1940. London: Longman. ISBN 978-0-582-50714-2.
- Lord Riddell (1984). McEwen, John M. (ed.). The Riddell Diaries: 1908–1923. London: The Athlone Press. ISBN 978-0-485-11300-6.
- Rintala, Marvin (Spring 1993). "Taking the Pledge: H. H. Asquith and Drink". Biography. 16 (2): 103–135. doi:10.1353/bio.2010.0351. JSTOR 23539576. S2CID 154967226.
- Rose, Kenneth (1985). Curzon: A Most Superior Person. London: Macmillan. ISBN 978-0-333-39060-3.
- Spender, J. A.; Asquith, Cyril (1932). Life of Herbert Henry Asquith, Lord Oxford and Asquith. London: Hutchinson. OCLC 767392. vol 2 from 1912 online
- Taylor, A. J. P. (1972). Beaverbrook. London: Hamish Hamilton. ISBN 9789070006525. OCLC 607732694.
- Terrill, Richard (2013). World Criminal Justice Systems: A Comparative Survey. Waltham, US: Anderson. ISBN 978-1-4557-2589-2.
- Thompson, J. Lee (2000). Northcliffe – Press Baron in Politics, 1865–1922. London: John Murray. ISBN 978-0-7195-5725-5.
- Toye, Richard (2007). Lloyd George and Churchill – Rivals for Greatness. London: Macmillan. ISBN 978-1-4050-4896-5.
- Trevelyan, G. M. (1940). Grey of Fallodon. London: Longmans, Green and Co. OCLC 669134853.
- Tyack, Geoffrey; Bradley, Simon; Pevsner, Nikolaus (2010). Berkshire. The Buildings of England. Yale University Press. ISBN 978-0-300-12662-4.
- Weston, Corinne Comstock (1968). "The Liberal Leadership and the Lords' Veto, 1907–1910". The Historical Journal. 11 (3): 508–537. doi:10.1017/S0018246X00001679. JSTOR 2638166. S2CID 159632264.
- Whitfield, Bob (2001). The Extension of the Franchise, 1832–1931. Oxford: Heinemann. ISBN 978-0-435-32717-0.
- Wilson, John (1973). CB: A Life of Sir Henry Campbell-Bannerman. London: Constable and Company. ISBN 978-0-09-458950-6. "CB A life of Sir Henry Campbell-Bannerman."
- Woodward, David R. (1998). Field Marshal Sir William Robertson: Chief of the Imperial General Staff in the Great War. Westport: Praeger. ISBN 978-0-275-95422-2.
- Young, Kenneth (1963). Arthur James Balfour. London: G. Bell & Sons. OCLC 1627683.

=== Primary sources ===
- Asquith, H. H. (1918). Occasional Addresses 1893–1916. London: Macmillan and Co. OCLC 4086237.
- Asquith, H. H. (1926). Fifty Years of Parliament Volume 1. London: Cassell & Co. OCLC 15982.
- Asquith, H. H. (1926). Fifty Years of Parliament, Volume 2. London: Cassell & Co. OCLC 15982.
- Amery, Leo (1980). Barnes, John; Nicholson, David (eds.). The Leo Amery Diaries Volume 1 1896–1929. London: Hutchinson. ISBN 978-0-09-131910-6.
- Asquith, Cynthia (1987). Asquith, Michael; Asquith, Simon (eds.). The Diaries of Lady Cynthia Asquith 1915–18. London: Century Hutchinson. ISBN 978-0-7126-1787-1. OCLC 17727845.
- Asquith, H. H. (1923). The Genesis of the War. London: Cassell & Co. OCLC 750479258.
- Asquith, H. H. (1928). Memories and Reflections Volume 1. London: Cassell & Co. OCLC 499252263.
- Asquith, H. H. (1928). Memories and Reflections Volume 2. London: Cassell & Co. OCLC 499252263.
- Asquith, H. H. (1933). Letters of the Earl of Oxford and Asquith to a Friend, First Series. London: Geoffrey Bles. OCLC 624755.
- Asquith, H. H. (1934). Letters of the Earl of Oxford and Asquith to a Friend, Second Series. London: Geoffrey Bles. OCLC 624755.
- Asquith, H. H. (1985). Brock, Michael; Brock, Eleanor (eds.). H.H. Asquith: Letters to Venetia Stanley. Oxford: Oxford University Press. ISBN 978-0-19-212200-1. OCLC 8345827.
- Asquith, Margot (1962). The Autobiography of Margot Asquith. London: Eyre & Spottiswoode. OCLC 3023145.
- Asquith, Margot (2014). Brock, Michael; Brock, Eleanor (eds.). Margot Asquith's Great War Diary – 1914–1916. Oxford: Oxford University Press. ISBN 978-0-19-822977-3.
- Asquith, Herbert (1938). Moments of Memory: Recollections and Impressions. London: Hutchinson & Co. OCLC 1447379.
- Asquith, Raymond (1980). Jolliffe, John (ed.). Raymond Asquith: Life and Letters. London: Century. ISBN 978-0-7126-1491-7.
- Viscount Samuel (1945). Memoirs by the Rt. Hon. Viscount Samuel P.C., G.C.B., G.B.E. London: The Cresset Press. OCLC 575921.
- Scott, C. P. (1970). Wilson, Trevor (ed.). The Political Diaries of C. P. Scott 1911–1928. London: Collins. ISBN 978-0-8014-0569-3.
- Simon, John (1952). Retrospect: The Memoirs of the Rt. Hon. Viscount Simon. London: Hutchinson. OCLC 652361601.

Parliament of the United Kingdom
Preceded by John Boyd Kinnear	Member of Parliament for East Fife; 1886–1918	Succeeded by Alexander Sprot
Preceded by John McCallum	Member of Parliament for Paisley; 1920–1924	Succeeded by Edward Rosslyn Mitchell
Political offices
Preceded by Henry Matthews	Home Secretary; 1892–1895	Succeeded by Sir Matthew White Ridley
Preceded by Austen Chamberlain	Chancellor of the Exchequer; 1905–1908	Succeeded by David Lloyd George
Preceded by Sir Henry Campbell-Bannerman	Prime Minister of the United Kingdom; 1908–1916	Succeeded by David Lloyd George
Preceded by Sir Henry Campbell-Bannerman	Leader of the House of Commons; 1908–1916	Succeeded by Bonar Law
Preceded by J. E. B. Seely	Secretary of State for War; 1914	Succeeded by Herbert Kitchener, 1st Earl Kitchener
Preceded by Sir Edward Carson	Leader of the Opposition; 1916–1918	Succeeded by Sir Donald Maclean
Preceded by Sir Donald Maclean	Leader of the Opposition; 1920–1922	Succeeded by Ramsay MacDonald
Party political offices
Preceded by Sir Henry Campbell-Bannerman	Leader of the British Liberal Party; 1908–1926	Succeeded by David Lloyd George
Preceded by Sir Henry Campbell-Bannerman	Liberal Leader in the Commons; 1908–1924	Succeeded by David Lloyd George
Preceded by Henry Campbell-Bannerman	President of the Scottish Liberal Federation; 1909–1928	Succeeded by John Hamilton-Gordon, 1st Marquess of Aberdeen and Temair
Academic offices
Preceded by George Wyndham	Rector of the University of Glasgow; 1905–1908	Succeeded by George Curzon, 1st Marquess Curzon of Kedleston
Preceded by Sir Frederick Treves	Rector of the University of Aberdeen; 1908 – 1911	Succeeded by Andrew Carnegie
Peerage of the United Kingdom
New creation	Earl of Oxford and Asquith; 1925–1928	Succeeded by Julian Asquith, 2nd Earl of Oxford and Asquith
Awards and achievements
Preceded by Samuel Gompers	Cover of Time magazine 8 October 1923	Succeeded by Frank O. Lowden
