= Asquith family =

20th century English family

Coat of Arms of the Asquith family

The Asquiths were originally a middle-class family from the West Riding of Yorkshire, England. They were members of the Congregational church, whose family name derived from the village of Askwith. The first prominent member of the family was H. H. Asquith, who was prime minister from 1908 to 1916. In 1925, Asquith was raised to the peerage as Earl of Oxford and Asquith. His great-grandson Raymond is the present Earl.

All of H. H. Asquith's seven children achieved some prominence in national affairs. By his first wife Helen Kelsall Melland (d. 1891), he had four sons and one daughter. All of the sons volunteered for the Front early in the war. The eldest son, Raymond, a barrister and poet, was killed in action in 1916. The second son, Herbert, was a poet who married Lady Cynthia Charteris, a writer and anthologist. The third son, Arthur, became a Brigadier. The fourth son, Cyril (1890–1954), became a Law Lord. The daughter, Violet (1887–1969) became a Liberal politician herself.

By his second wife, the former Margot Tennant, Asquith had two more children. His daughter Elizabeth (1897–1945) was a writer who married a Romanian prince, becoming Princess Antoine Bibesco. His youngest son Anthony (1902–1968) became a well-known film director.

== Prominent members ==
Living descendants are omitted unless they are notable and/or have a separate Wikipedia entry.

- H. H. Asquith (12 September 1852 – 15 February 1928), married firstly (1877) Helen Kelsall Melland (1856–1891), issue 4 sons and 1 daughter
  - Raymond Asquith (6 November 1878 – 15 September 1916; killed in action), barrister and poet; married 1907 Katharine Horner (1885–1976); 1 son and 2 daughters.
    - Helen Asquith OBE (1908–2000), teacher and school inspector, was appointed OBE in 1965, and awarded the papal medal Pro Ecclesia et Pontifice in 1989 for charitable work. She did not marry.
    - Perdita Asquith (1910–1996) who married William Jolliffe, 4th Baron Hylton (d. 1967) and had issue two sons (including the present incumbent) and one daughter
      - Raymond Jolliffe, 5th Baron Hylton (b. 13 June 1932), married 1966 Joanna de Bertodano, issue 4 sons and 1 daughter
      - John Jolliffe
      - Mary Jolliffe (d. 2009), married John Paget Chancellor (b. 1927), issue 1 son and 3 daughters
        - Katherine Chancellor, or Kate Chancellor (b. 1961) formerly married 1989-97 to novelist Will Self, issue 1 son and 1 daughter.
        - John Edward Horner Chancellor (b. 1962), financial historian and former investment strategist
        - Anna Chancellor (b. 27 April 1965), actress, issue 1 daughter
    - Julian Asquith, 2nd Earl of Oxford and Asquith (22 April 1916 – 16 January 2011) married Anne Palairet (14 November 1916 – 19 August 1998); issue 2 sons and 3 daughters.
      - Raymond Asquith, 3rd Earl of Oxford and Asquith (b. 24 August 1952), British diplomat and businessman; married Mary Clare Pollen (b. 2 June 1951), daughter of Francis Pollen; issue 1 son and 4 daughters
      - Sir Dominic Asquith, British diplomat (b. 7 February 1957), Ambassador to Iraq 2006–7, Ambassador to Egypt 2007–11 and Ambassador to Libya 2011–12.; married to Louise Cotton (b. 1962), and has issue 2 sons and 2 daughters (Helena and Gabriela Asquith).
      - Lady Katherine Page; married firstly (divorced) Sir Adam Ridley (himself grandson of Violet Bonham Carter, Baroness Asquith of Yarnbury); married secondly J. C. Page.
  - Herbert Asquith (11 March 1881 – 5 August 1947), poet and lawyer; married to Lady Cynthia Charteris (27 September 1887 – 31 March 1960), writer, a daughter of the Hugo Charteris, 11th Earl of Wemyss and 7th Earl of March; issue 3 sons
    - John Michael Asquith (9 May 1911 – May 1937)
    - Michael Henry Asquith (25 July 1914 – 19 January 2004); twice married and had issue 2 sons and 1 daughter.
    - Simon Roland Anthony Asquith (20 August 1919 – 18 December 1973); m. 1 October 1942 Vivien Lawrence Jones; they had issue 2 sons and 1 daughter.
  - Brigadier-General Arthur Asquith (24 April 1883 – 25 August 1939); married to Betty Manners, a daughter of John Manners-Sutton, 3rd Baron Manners, and had issue.
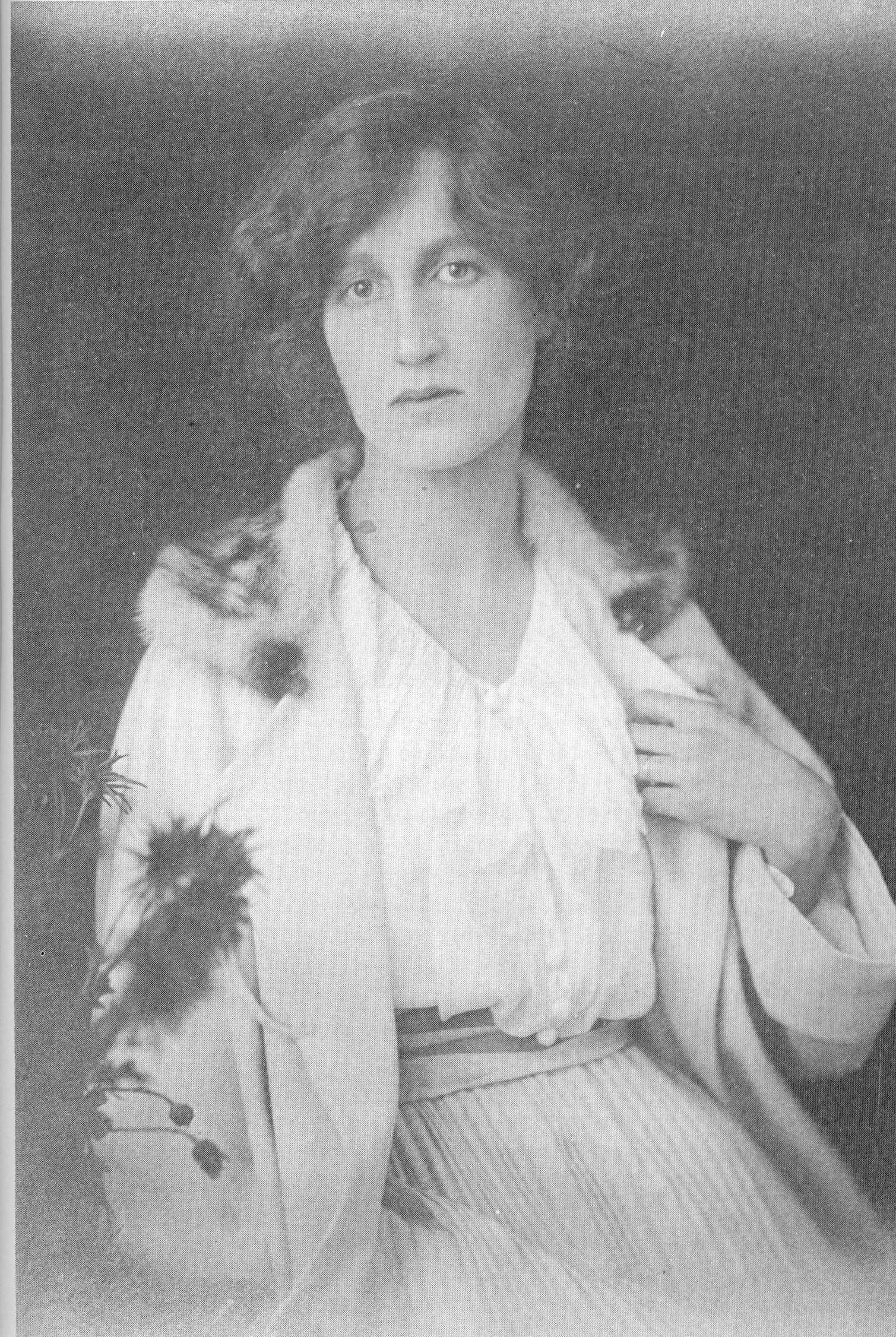
    Violet Bonham-Carter, Baroness Asquith of Yarnbury.
  - (Lady) Violet Asquith, later Bonham Carter (15 April 1887 – 19 February 1969), who became Baroness Asquith of Yarnbury in 1964; married 1916 Sir Maurice Bonham Carter (11 October 1880 – 7 June 1960), her father's private secretary, and had issue 2 sons and 2 daughters
    - Helen Cressida Bonham Carter (22 April 1917 – 17 June 1997), married 1939 Jasper Ridley (1913–1943); issue one son
      - Sir Adam Ridley (b. 14 May 1942)
    - Laura Bonham Carter (13 October 1918 - 15 February 1994), married Jo Grimond, Baron Grimond of Firth (19 July 1913 – 24 October 1993); issue 3 sons and 1 daughter.
      - (Joseph) Andrew Grimond (26 March 1939 – 23 March 1966) deputy editor, The Scotsman at his death.
      - Grizelda Jane Grimond (b. 1942), who lived for many years with Tony Richardson (d. 1991), with issue.
      - John Jasper Grimond, or "Johnny" Grimond (b. 1946) former Foreign Editor, The Economist, married Roberta Katherine "Kate" Fleming (b. 1946), co-heir of Ian Fleming, her paternal uncle, since 1996/7. Has issue.
    - Mark Bonham Carter, Baron Bonham-Carter (11 February 1922 – 4 September 1994), himself a life peer; married 1955 Leslie Nast; issue 3 daughters
      - Jane Bonham Carter, Baroness Bonham-Carter of Yarnbury (b. 20 October 1957), married Tim Razzall, Baron Razzall (b. 12 June 1943)
    - Raymond Bonham Carter (1929–2004), married Elena Proper de Callejón; had issue 2 sons and 1 daughter.
      - Edward Bonham Carter (b. 24 May 1960), banker; married Victoria Studd with issue 2 sons and 1 daughter.
      - Helena Bonham Carter (b. 1966), actress; partnered with Tim Burton, has issue 1 son and 1 daughter.
  - Cyril Asquith, Baron Asquith of Bishopstone (5 February 1890 – 24 August 1954); married 1918 Anne Stephanie Pollock (27 April 1896–1964), of the Pollock Baronets; they had issue 2 sons and 2 daughters.
    - Luke Asquith (1919−1994), whose daughter Anne (b. 1965) is married since 1989 to Roderick Cavendish (b. 1959), son and heir of Frederick Caryll Philip Cavendish, 7th Baron Waterpark and has issue two sons.
    - Paul Asquith (4 January 1927–1984) married 1953 (div 1963) as her first husband Helena Mary Bridgeman (b. 1932) and has issue two children. He married 1963 Caroline Anne Carew Pole and had further issue, two children. All four children are married with issue.
    - (Frances) Rose Asquith (1925−2020) married Sir John Frederick Eustace Stephenson, Lord Justice of Appeal (d. 1998), son of Sir Guy Stephenson, and had issue.
- H. H. Asquith (12 September 1852 – 15 February 1928), married secondly 1894 Margot Tennant (2 February 1864 – 28 July 1945), surviving issue 1 son and 1 daughter.
  - Lady Elizabeth Asquith (26 February 1897 – 7 April 1945) married Prince Antoine Bibesco (19 July 1878 – 2 September 1951); issue 1 daughter.
  - Anthony Asquith (9 November 1902 – 20 February 1968), filmmaker.

== See also ==
- Earl of Oxford and Asquith
