= Bonham Carter family =

British family

Bonham Carter
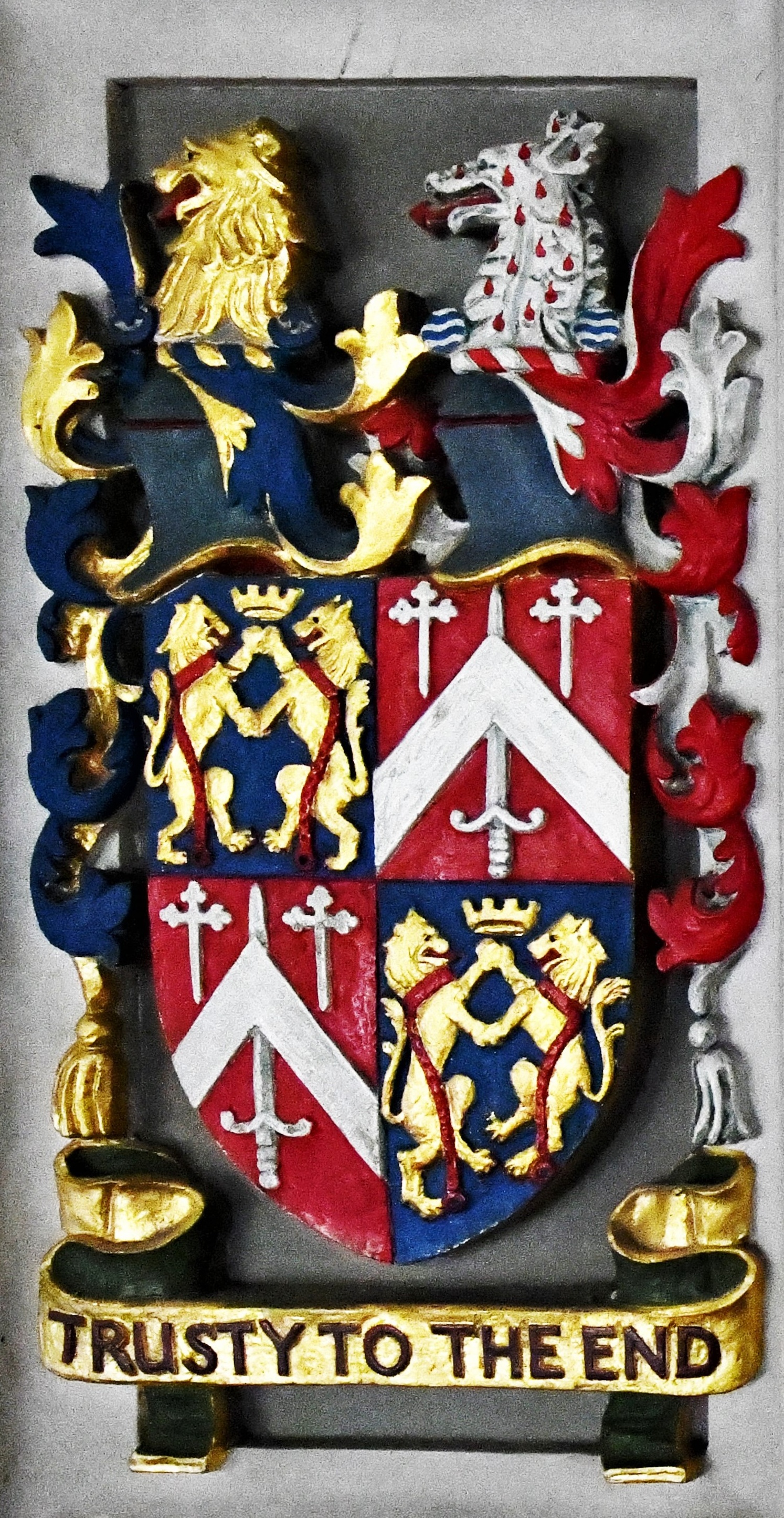
- Country: United Kingdom
- Founder: John Bonham-Carter
- Motto: Trusty to the end

The Bonham Carter family is a British family that has included several prominent people active in various spheres in the United Kingdom.

== Antecedents ==
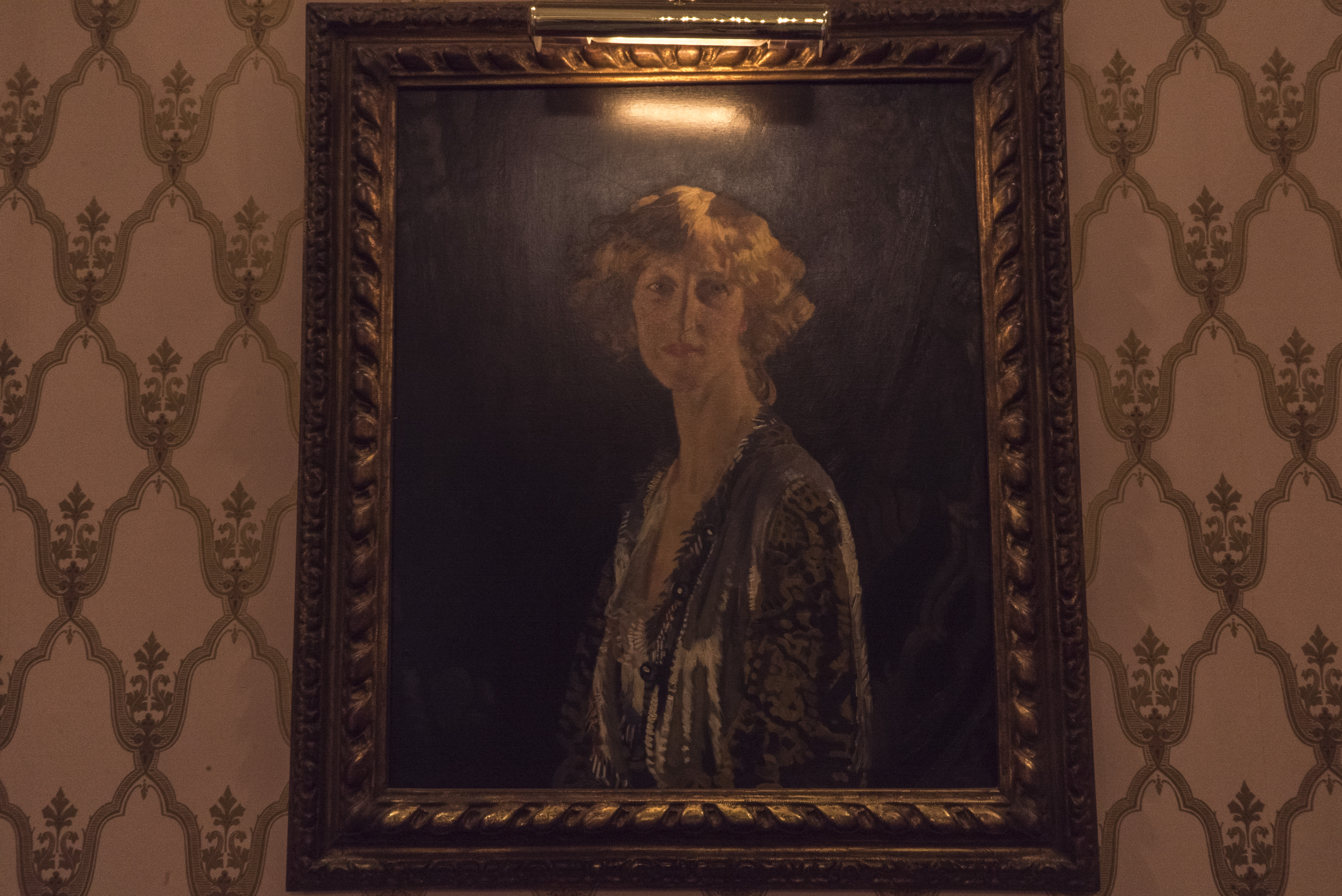
Portrait of Violet Bonham Carter, Baroness Asquith of Yarnbury, paternal grandmother of Helena Bonham Carter and Jane Bonham Carter, Baroness Bonham Carter of Yarnbury, maternal grandmother of Sir Adam Nicholas Ridley

The Bonham Carter family are the descendants of John Bonham-Carter (1788–1838) and Joanna Maria Smith (1791–1884).

He was the son of Sir John Carter (born before 20 December 1741 – 18 May 1808, sometime Mayor of Portsmouth, himself a son of John Carter, a merchant). He assumed the additional surname Bonham by royal licence when he inherited the estates of his cousin Thomas Bonham. Most of the Bonham Carters have belonged to Unitarian churches.

The first to use the double-barrelled name, John Bonham Carter (1788–1838), was a British Member of Parliament and barrister. His wife Joanna Maria Smith was the daughter of William Smith, the abolitionist MP; her sister Frances was the mother of Florence Nightingale, and her brother Benjamin was the father of Barbara Bodichon and Benjamin Leigh Smith.

John and Joanna's daughter, (Joanna) Hilary Bonham Carter (1821–1865), was an artist and friend of political journalist Harriet Martineau. Hilary's portraits of her cousin Florence Nightingale are held in the National Portrait Gallery.

John and Joanna had a son, the fourth generation named John (1817–1884), and also an MP. This John Bonham Carter briefly served as a Lord of the Treasury in 1866.

His third son by his second wife, The Hon. Mary Baring (a daughter of The 1st Baron Northbrook), was Arthur Thomas Bonham Carter, KC (1869–1916), who was educated at Winchester College and Trinity College, Cambridge. A. T. Bonham Carter was a soldier and barrister, eventually serving as a Justice of the bench of His Majesty's High Court of British East Africa, which was based in Mombasa. Mr Justice Bonham Carter was still a judge on the bench of this court when the First World War broke out in 1914. He later resigned from the colonial bench in British East Africa and joined, as an officer, The 1st Battalion, The Hampshire Regiment, eventually being promoted to the rank of captain. He was killed serving with this regiment on the first day of the Battle of the Somme, 1 July 1916, and was later buried in Serre Road Military Cemetery No. 2, near Beaumont-Hamel in northern France. Captain Bonham Carter's name appears on the war memorial at the Muthaiga Country Club in Nairobi.

The Bonham Carter family, as descended from Sir Maurice Bonham Carter and The Baroness Asquith of Yarnbury, is the only example so far where three generations have received life peerages under the Life Peerages Act 1958: (Note: The titles of the three judges Baron Russell of Killowen were created under the Appellate Jurisdiction Act 1876.) Violet, Baroness Asquith of Yarnbury; her son, Mark Raymond Bonham Carter; and her granddaughter, Jane Bonham Carter, were all separately made life peers of Yarnbury in the County of Wiltshire.

One of the most famous members of the Bonham Carter family is the film actress Helena Bonham Carter, a two-time Academy Award nominee and British Academy Film Award winner.

== Prominent members ==
Living descendants are omitted, unless they are notable or have a separate Wikipedia entry. Each indentation indicates a generation.

The family members include:

- John Bonham-Carter (1788–1838), MP, married Joanna Maria Smith, daughter of William Smith (1756–1835), abolitionist.

- John Bonham-Carter (1817–1884), MP, married Mary Baring, daughter of Francis Thornhill Baring, 1st Baron Northbrook

- Lothian George Bonham-Carter (1858–1927), married Emily Maud Sumner

- Esme Mary Maud Bonham Carter (1884–1956), married (1) Basil Murray Tomlinson, married (2) John Selwyn
- Algernon Bonham Carter (1888–1957), married Myra Foyle
- Admiral Sir Stuart Sumner Bonham Carter (1889–1972), married Eve Lloyd

- Alfred Bonham Carter (1825–1910), married Mary Henrietta Norman

- Guy Bonham Carter (1884–1915), married Kathleen Arkwright, one son, one daughter
- Alfred Erskine Bonham Carter (1880–1921), married Margaret Emily Malcolm

- Rear-Admiral Sir Christopher Douglas Bonham-Carter (1907–1975), married Marion MacIntyre Hutchinson Taylor
- Dr Richard Erskine Bonham-Carter (1910-1994)

- Peter Malcolm Bonham-Carter (1936–2019), married Clodagh Greenwood

- Crispin Daniel Bonham-Carter (b. 1969), married Katherine Julian Dawnay, four sons

- Henry Bonham Carter (1827–1921), married Sibella Charlotte Norman

- Herman Bonham-Carter (1863–1945), married Margaret Louisa Wathen (c.1861–1940), daughter of William Wathen

- Philip Bonham-Carter (1891–1934), cricketer and Royal Navy officer
- Katherine Hilary Margaret Bonham-Carter (1901-1989), married Sir John Wakeling Baker

- Walter Henry Bonham-Carter (1866-1947)
- Sir Edgar Bonham-Carter (1870–1956)
- General Sir Charles Bonham-Carter (1876–1955), married Gabriele Fisher

- Victor Bonham-Carter (1913–2007)
  - Graeme Bonham-Carter (born 1939)

- Sir Maurice Bonham Carter (1880–1960) married Violet Asquith, Baroness Asquith of Yarnbury, life peer.

- Helen Cressida Bonham Carter (1916–1998), married Jasper Ridley (1913–1944)

- Sir Adam Nicholas Ridley (born 1942), married (1) Lady Katherine Asquith (divorced) and (2) Margaret Anne Passmore, three sons

- Laura Miranda Bonham Carter (1918–1994), married the Liberal Party leader Jo Grimond, three sons, one daughter
- Mark Raymond Bonham Carter, Baron Bonham-Carter (1922–1994), MP, life peer, married Leslie Nast, three daughters

- Jane Bonham Carter, Baroness Bonham-Carter of Yarnbury (b. 1957), life peer, partner of Tim Razzall, Baron Razzall

- Raymond Henry Bonham Carter (1929–2004), married Elena Propper de Callejón, two sons, one daughter

- Edward Henry Bonham Carter (b. 1960), married Victoria Studd, two sons, one daughter
- Helena Bonham Carter (b. 1966), has children with former partner Tim Burton, one son, one daughter

- Hugh Bonham Carter (1832–1896), married Jane Margaret MacDonald (1849–1911)

- Air Commodore Ian Malcolm Bonham-Carter (1882–1953)
- Francis Hugh Bonham-Carter, married in 1911 Gillian Margaret Hope Somerville (1890–1982, later wife of prince Maximilian von Lobkowicz, 1888–1967)

== See also ==
- Asquith family
