= Laura Grimond =

British Liberal Party politician

The Right Honourable The Lady Grimond
- Laura Grimond
- Born: Laura Miranda Bonham-Carter; 13 October 1918; Marylebone, London, England
- Died: 15 February 1994 (aged 75)
- Occupation: Politician
- Political party: Liberal
- Spouse: Jo Grimond (m. 1938; died 1993)
- Children: 4
- Parent(s): Sir Maurice Bonham Carter; Violet Asquith
- Relatives: Mark Bonham Carter (brother); Raymond Bonham Carter (brother); H. H. Asquith (maternal grandfather)
- Family: Bonham Carter, Asquith

Laura Miranda Grimond, Baroness Grimond (née Bonham-Carter; 13 October 1918 – 15 February 1994) was a British Liberal Party politician, and the wife of party leader Jo Grimond.

== Background ==
Born in Marylebone, London, into the Bonham Carter family, she was the daughter of Sir Maurice Bonham Carter and his wife, Liberal politician Violet Asquith. She was the granddaughter of Liberal Prime Minister, H. H. Asquith. She was also an elder sister of Mark Bonham Carter, who was the Liberal victor of the 1958 by-election at Torrington and Raymond Bonham Carter, who was the father of actress Helena Bonham Carter.

In 1938, she married Jo Grimond at St Margaret's, Westminster. The couple had four children:

- (Joseph) Andrew Grimond (26 March 1939 – 23 March 1966), a sub-editor of The Scotsman, lived in Edinburgh until his suicide at the age of 26.
- Grizelda "Gelda" (Jane) Grimond (1942–2017), who had a daughter Katherine (born 1973) by the film and stage director Tony Richardson.
- John (Jasper) Grimond (born October 1946), a former foreign editor of The Economist as Johnny Grimond, now writer at large for the publication, who in 1973 married Kate Fleming (born 1946), elder daughter of the writer Peter Fleming and actress Celia Johnson, and has three children with her. He is the main author of The Economist Style Guide
- (Thomas) Magnus Grimond (born 13 June 1959), journalist and financial correspondent, married to travel author Laura Grimond (née Raison), and has four children.

== Political career ==
Laura Grimond was Liberal candidate for the West Aberdeenshire division at the 1970 General Election. West Aberdeenshire was a seat the Liberals had gained from the Conservatives at the previous general election. The Liberal victor James Davidson decided not to defend his seat and instead campaigned for Laura Grimond. Her prospects of holding the seat lessened when a SNP candidate intervened in the contest. However The Times, the Conservative leaning national newspaper made a point of endorsing her by name; through "an invocation of 'the Asquith ideal', which called strenuously for more Liberal MPs and in particular for Mrs Laura Grimond." In a difficult election for the Liberal Party nationwide, the Conservatives regained the seat, beating her by over 5,000 votes. She did not stand for parliament again. She continued to be active for the Liberal Party at a national level; From 1983 to 1985 she was President of the Women's Liberal Federation. Three times during the mid-1980s she appeared as a party spokesperson on BBC's Question Time. She was also politically active locally in Orkney; She was a councillor for Firth & Harray and chairman of Orkney Islands Council's Housing Committee.

=== Electoral record ===
General election 1970: West Aberdeenshire
Party	Candidate	Votes	%	±%
	Colin Campbell Mitchell	18,396	46.6	+6.9
	Laura Miranda Grimond	12,847	32.5	−10.7
	Walter W. Hay	6,141	15.5	−1.6
	John G. McKinlay	2,112	5.3	n/a
Majority		5,549	14.1	17.6
Turnout		39,496	75.0	
	Conservative gain from Liberal	Swing	+8.8	

== Other ==
In 1968 Grimond was a co-founder of the Orkney Heritage Society.

Party political offices
Preceded by Elizabeth Sidney	President of the Women's Liberal Federation; 1983–1985	Succeeded by Christina Baron
