= Mill House and The Wharf, Sutton Courtenay =

Mill House
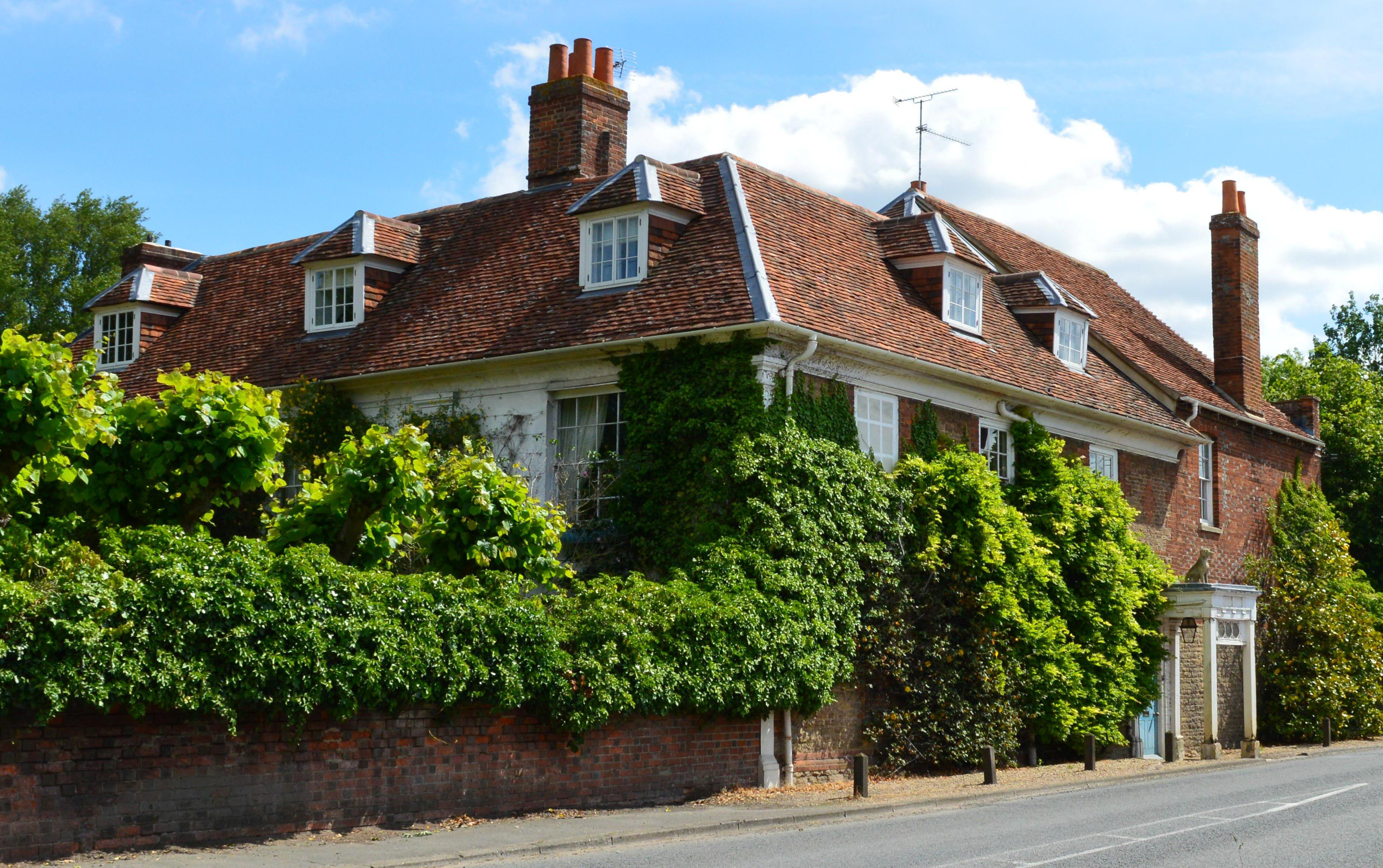
- Mill House in 2015

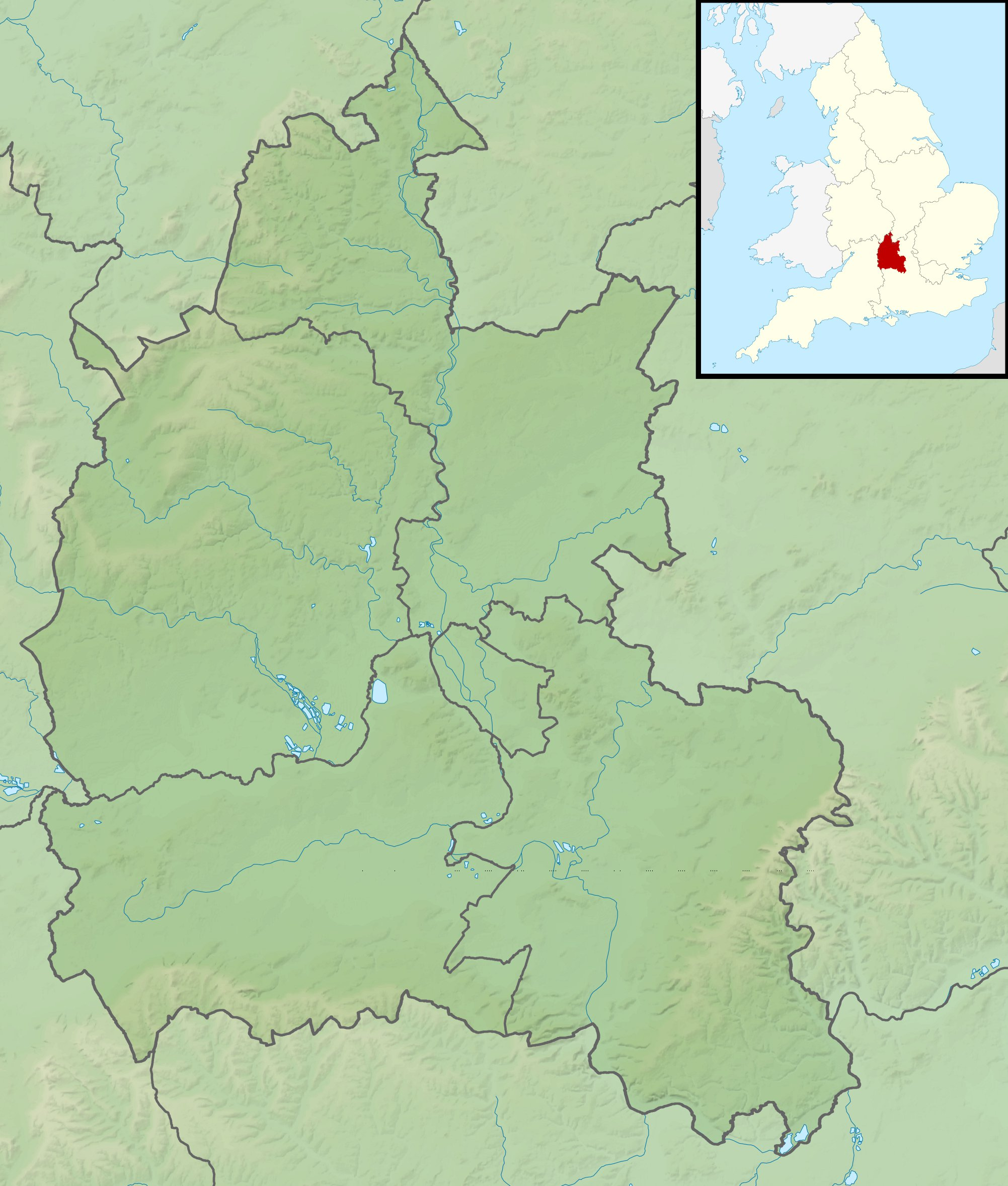
- Location within Oxfordshire
- 51.646°N 1.2712°W
- Type: House
- Location: Sutton Courtenay, Oxfordshire

History
- Built: 1913 with earlier origins

Site notes
- Architect: Walter Cave
- Architectural style: Vernacular
- Governing body: Privately owned

Listed Building – Grade II
- Official name: The Wharf
- Designated: 9 February 1966
- Reference no.: 1052730

Listed Building – Grade II
- Official name: Mill House
- Designated: 6 August 1952
- Reference no.: 1368101

Listed Building – Grade II
- Official name: Walton House
- Designated: 9 February 1966
- Reference no.: 1284624

Listed Building – Grade II
- Official name: Wharf Barn
- Designated: 9 February 1966
- Reference no.: 1182296

The Wharf, Walton House and Mill House are three houses in Church Street, Sutton Courtenay, Oxfordshire, England. They are part of a complex of buildings bought and expanded by Margot Asquith, wife of the then Prime Minister H. H. Asquith, from 1911 and which formed their country home until his death in 1928. Renovations and expansions were undertaken by the architect Walter Cave and were funded by a number of Margot Asquith's friends and admirers. Margot sold the complex in 1932, and the houses have subsequently been in separate ownership. In 2006, Helena Bonham Carter, Asquith's great-granddaughter bought back Mill House. All three properties are Grade II listed buildings.

== History ==
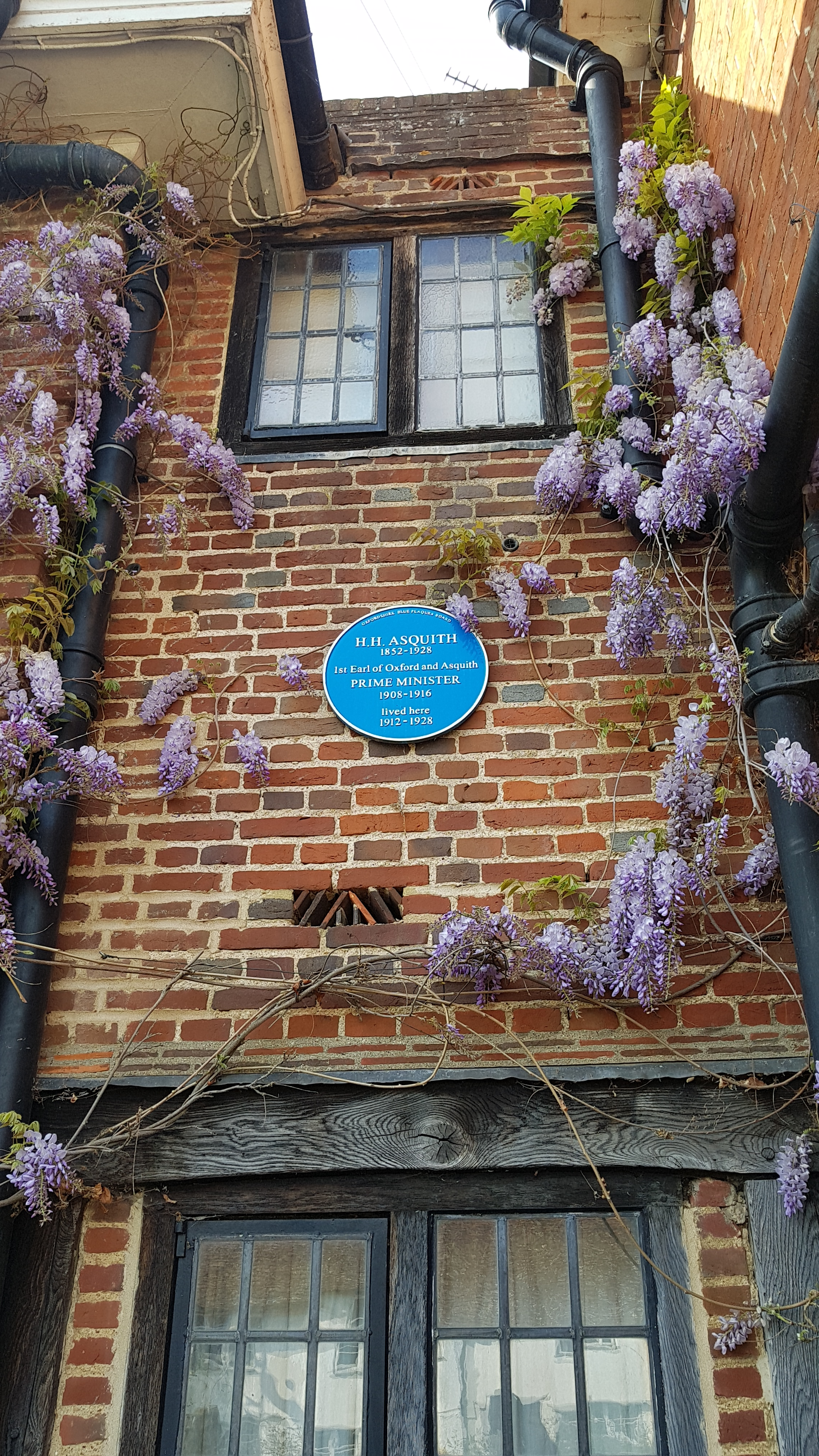
Blue plaque at The Wharf commemorating Asquith's residence

Margot Asquith bought the Wharf from her friend Maud Tree in 1911. Financial support was provided by Margot's admirer, the banker J. P. Morgan. In 1917, she acquired the Mill House to provide additional guest accommodation. On this occasion, financial support was obtained from Lady Boot, wife of the "Chemist to the Nation", Jesse Boot. Her architect throughout was Walter Cave. At the time the Asquiths lived there, and until a county reorganisation in 1974, Sutton Courtenay was located in Berkshire and is referred to as being in Berkshire in the many diaries and collections of letters which mention the house. The most recent Pevsner, although published in 2010, also follows this convention. Asquith was addicted to "weekending" and many Friday-to-Mondays were spent at the Wharf.

Asquith died at the house on the morning of 5 February 1928. His daughter Violet recorded his last weeks: "To watch Father's glorious mind breaking up and sinking - like a great ship - is a pain beyond all my imagining. I did not know life could be as cruel as this". Asquith is buried in the churchyard at Sutton Courtenay. In 1932, facing continuing financial worries, Margot sold the house. In 2012 Asquith's great-grandson, Raymond, unveiled a Blue plaque at the Wharf commemorating Asquith's residence at the house.

In 2006, Mill House was bought by Asquith's great-granddaughter, the actress Helena Bonham Carter and her then partner, the director Tim Burton. In 2007, the Wharf was placed on the market.

== Architecture and description ==
Asquith's grandson, Mark Bonham Carter, described the house in his Introduction to Margot Asquith's autobiography, republished in 1962. "It was an unattractive house and did not escape the vulgarity which hangs around the Thames Valley." Pevsner describes Cave's overall style as "neo-William-and-Mary". The Wharf is a two-storey house built with English bond red bricks. The Mill House is also in brick and dates from the 18th century with earlier elements, and later additions undertaken by Cave. Walton House, again in red brick, although this time in Flemish bond, is early 19th century, again with Cave-designed embellishments. The barn in the grounds of the Wharf, overlooking the River Thames, was converted by Cave into a retreat for Margot Asquith in 1913.

The Wharf, Mill House and Walton House all have Grade II designations. The Barn is also listed Grade II.

== Sources ==
- Asquith, Margot (1962). The Autobiography of Margot Asquith. London: Eyre & Spottiswoode. OCLC 3023145.
- Bonham Carter, Violet (1999). Pottle, Mark (ed.). Champion Redoubtable: The Diaries and Letters of Violet Bonham Carter 1914–1945. London: Weidenfeld & Nicolson. ISBN 978-0-7538-0546-6.
- Clifford, Colin (2002). The Asquiths. London: John Murray. ISBN 978-0-7195-5457-5.
- Jenkins, Roy (1964). Asquith (first ed.). London: Collins. OCLC 243906913.
- Tyack, Geoffrey; Bradley, Simon; Pevsner, Nikolaus (2010). Berkshire. The Buildings Of England. Yale University Press. ISBN 978-0-300-12662-4.
