= Raymond Bonham Carter =

British banker (1929–2004)

The Honourable Raymond Bonham Carter
- Born: Raymond Henry Bonham Carter; 19 June 1929; Paddington, England
- Died: 17 January 2004 (aged 74); London, England
- Occupation: Banker
- Years active: 1958–2004
- Spouse: Elena Propper de Callejón (m. 1958)
- Children: 3, including Edward and Helena
- Parent(s): Sir Maurice Bonham-Carter; Violet Asquith, Baroness Asquith of Yarnbury
- Family: Bonham Carter

Raymond Henry Bonham Carter (19 June 1929 – 17 January 2004) was a British banker and a member of the prominent Bonham Carter family.

== Early life ==
He was born in Paddington, London, into the prominent British Bonham Carter family, to Sir Maurice Bonham-Carter, a politician and cricketer, and his wife, Lady Violet Asquith, a political activist who was created Baroness Asquith of Yarnbury in 1964. Her father was H. H. Asquith, who served as Prime Minister from 1908 to 1916 and became the 1st Earl of Oxford and Asquith in 1925.

His elder siblings were Cressida Ridley, Laura Grimond and Mark Bonham Carter, Baron Bonham-Carter. He was educated at St. Ronan's School, Hawkhurst, Winchester College and Magdalen College, Oxford, graduating in 1952. He then went to Harvard Business School, graduating in 1954.

== Career ==
At various times, he held senior posts with the Bank of England (1958–1963), the International Monetary Fund (1961–1963), Warburgs (1963–1977), and the Department of Industry (1977–1979).

== Personal life, illness and death ==
In 1958, he married Elena Propper de Callejón, daughter of Spanish diplomat Eduardo Propper de Callejón and his Franco-Austrian Jewish wife, Hélène Roberte Fould-Springer. Together, they had three children:

- Edward Henry Bonham Carter (born 24 May 1960), Vice Chairman of fund management group Jupiter Fund Management.
- Thomas David Bonham Carter (born 8 December 1961), who manages a corporate governance agency.
- Helena Bonham Carter (born 26 May 1966), a twice Academy Award-nominated actress.

In 1979, he was diagnosed with a brain tumour, which was removed by surgery, but left him quadriplegic and partially blind.

Bonham Carter died on 17 January 2004.
