= Maurice Bonham-Carter =

British politician (1880–1960)

Sir Maurice Bonham-Carter KCB KCVO

Principal Private Secretary to the Prime Minister
- In office 1910–1916
- Prime Minister: H. H. Asquith

Personal details
- Born: 11 October 1880 Kensington, London, England
- Died: 7 June 1960 (aged 79)
- Resting place: St Andrew's Church, Mells
- Party: Liberal
- Spouse: Violet Asquith (m. 1915)
- Relations: Bonham Carter family
- Children: Cressida; Laura; Mark; Raymond
- Education: Winchester College; Balliol College, Oxford

Sir Maurice Bonham-Carter KCB KCVO (11 October 1880 – 7 June 1960) was an English Liberal politician. He was H. H. Asquith's Principal Private Secretary during Asquith's time as prime minister from 1910 to 1916 and later served in other government posts. He played cricket for Oxford University Cricket Club in the early 20th century. The actress Helena Bonham Carter is his granddaughter.

== Early life ==
Bonham-Carter, who was widely known by the nickname "Bongie", was born in Kensington, London, on 11 October 1880, into the prominent Bonham Carter family. He was the eleventh child born to Sibella Charlotte (née Norman) and Henry Bonham-Carter. His brothers included General Sir Charles Bonham-Carter, Governor of the Crown Colony of Malta from 1936 to 1940 and the lawyer Sir Edgar Bonham-Carter.

He was educated at Winchester College and Balliol College, Oxford. He was a right-handed batsman and wicket-keeper for Oxford University Cricket Club, playing thirteen times for the team in first-class cricket matches between 1901 and 1902. He was awarded his cricket Blue in 1902. His highest score in first-class cricket was 86 for Oxford versus H. D. G. Leveson Gower's XI at the Parks in 1902. Bonham-Carter also played one first-class match for Kent County Cricket Club in 1902.

== Career ==
He was called to the Bar at Lincoln's Inn in 1909. Between 1910 and 1916, Bonham-Carter served as the Principal Private Secretary to the Prime Minister H. H. Asquith during Asquith's tenure as prime minister. He travelled around the country with Asquith at the start of World War I and accompanied the Prime Minister when he visited the frontline at Ypres in 1915. He also visited Italy and, following the Easter Rising, Ireland with Asquith in 1916. When Asquith was replaced as prime minister by David Lloyd George in 1916, Bonham-Carter moved to become Assistant Secretary of the Ministry of Reconstruction and then, in 1918, joined the Air Ministry and Road Transport Board.

He became a leading figure in the British Liberal Party and was a "keen supporter of new ideas and imaginative personalities." He was a partner in a firm of stockbrokers. He also held a number of business directorships with companies including: Aero Engine Ltd, Alpha Cement Ltd, Earls Court Ltd, Blackburn and General Aircraft, Hanworth Securities Ltd, Scophony Ltd, Power Jets Ltd and was a partner with merchant bankers O.T. Falk and Partners, and stockbrokers Buckmaster & Moore.

=== Honours ===
Bonham-Carter was made Knight Commander of the Order of the Bath (KCB) in 1916 in Asquith's resignation honours and in the 1917 Birthday Honours was made a Knight Commander of the Royal Victorian Order (KCVO).

== Personal life ==
On 30 November 1915, he was married to Violet Asquith, daughter of then-British prime minister H. H. Asquith. As she was later made a life peeress, he and his wife were one of the few couples both of whom held titles in their own right. Together, they had four children:

- The Honourable (Helen Laura) Cressida Bonham-Carter (1916–1998), who married Jasper Ridley.
- The Honourable Laura Miranda Bonham Carter (1918–1994), who married Jo Grimond.
- Mark Bonham Carter, Baron Bonham Carter of Yarnbury (1922–1994)
- The Honourable Raymond Henry Bonham-Carter (1929–2004)

He died in 1960 aged 79 and is buried in the churchyard at St Andrew's Church, Mells in Somerset.

=== Descendants ===
Through his eldest daughter Cressida, he was a grandfather to Sir Adam Ridley. Through his eldest son Mark, he was a grandfather of three girls, including: Jane Bonham Carter, Baroness Bonham Carter of Yarnbury, the domestic partner of Tim Razzall, Baron Razzall. Through his youngest son Raymond, he was a grandfather to three including: Helena Bonham Carter and Edward Bonham Carter.

== See also ==
- Bonham Carter family
- Asquith family
