= Margot Asquith =

Anglo-Scottish socialite and author (1864–1945)

The Right Honourable The Countess of Oxford and Asquith
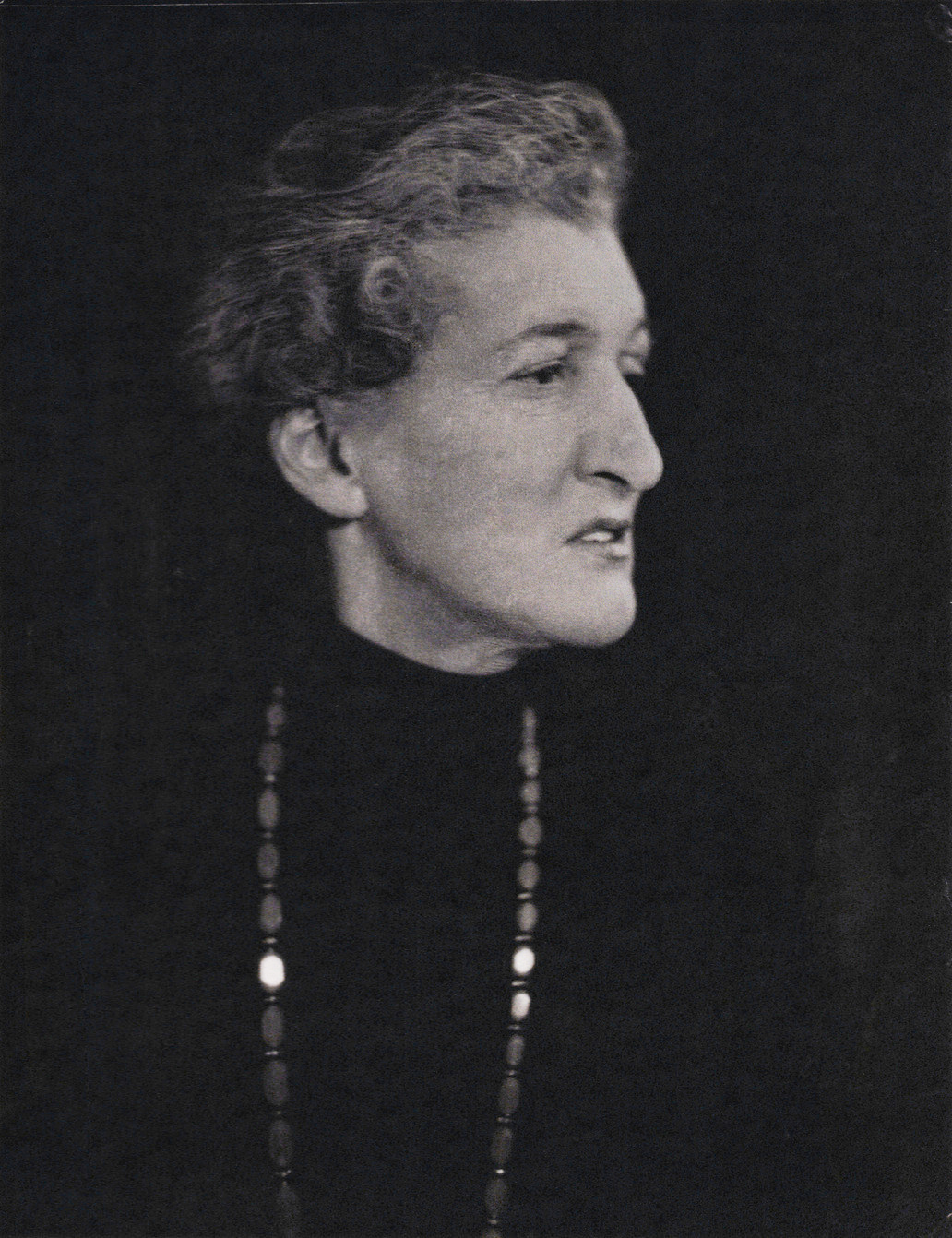
- Born: Emma Alice Margaret Tennant; 2 February 1864; The Glen, Peeblesshire, Scotland
- Died: 28 July 1945 (aged 81); London, England
- Resting place: All Saints' Church, Sutton Courtenay
- Known for: Spouse of the prime minister of the United Kingdom (1908–1916)
- Spouse: H. H. Asquith (m. 1894; died 1928)
- Children: 5, including Elizabeth and Anthony
- Parent: Sir Charles Tennant, Bt (father)
- Relatives: Tennant family; Asquith family

Signature
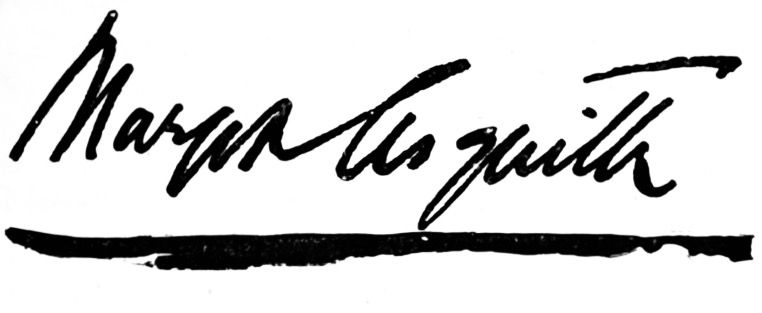

Emma Alice Margaret Asquith, Countess of Oxford and Asquith, née Tennant (/ˈmɑːrɡoʊ ˈæskwɪθ/; 2 February 1864 – 28 July 1945), known as Margot Asquith, was a British socialite and author. She was married to British Prime Minister H. H. Asquith from 1894 to his death in 1928. Known for her wit, in late Victorian society she was a member of the famed aristocratic group of intellectuals called "The Souls". An opponent of women's suffrage, whose autobiography was lampooned, Lady Oxford and Asquith was a controversial yet colourful character in her time.

== Early life ==
Emma Alice Margaret Tennant was born in 1864 at The Glen, the family's country estate in Peeblesshire, the 12th and youngest child of Sir Charles Tennant, 1st Baronet, an industrialist and politician, and Emma Winsloe. She never knew one of her five sisters and three of her six brothers, who died young. She was of Scottish and English descent and was a great-great-granddaughter of John Walter, founder of The Times. Known always as Margot, Tennant was brought up at The Glen; Asquith and her sister Laura grew up wild and uninhibited. Asquith was a "venturesome child", for example roaming the moors, climbing to the top of the roof by moonlight, riding her horse up the front steps of the estate house. Riding and golf were her lifelong passions.

The two girls were inseparable, entering society together in London in 1881. She and Laura became the central female figures of an aristocratic group of intellectuals called "The Souls" ("You are always talking about your souls," complained Lord Charles Beresford, thereby providing them with a suitable label). Laura married Alfred Lyttelton in 1885 and died in 1888, and Asquith's life was strongly impacted by these events.

== Mrs Asquith ==
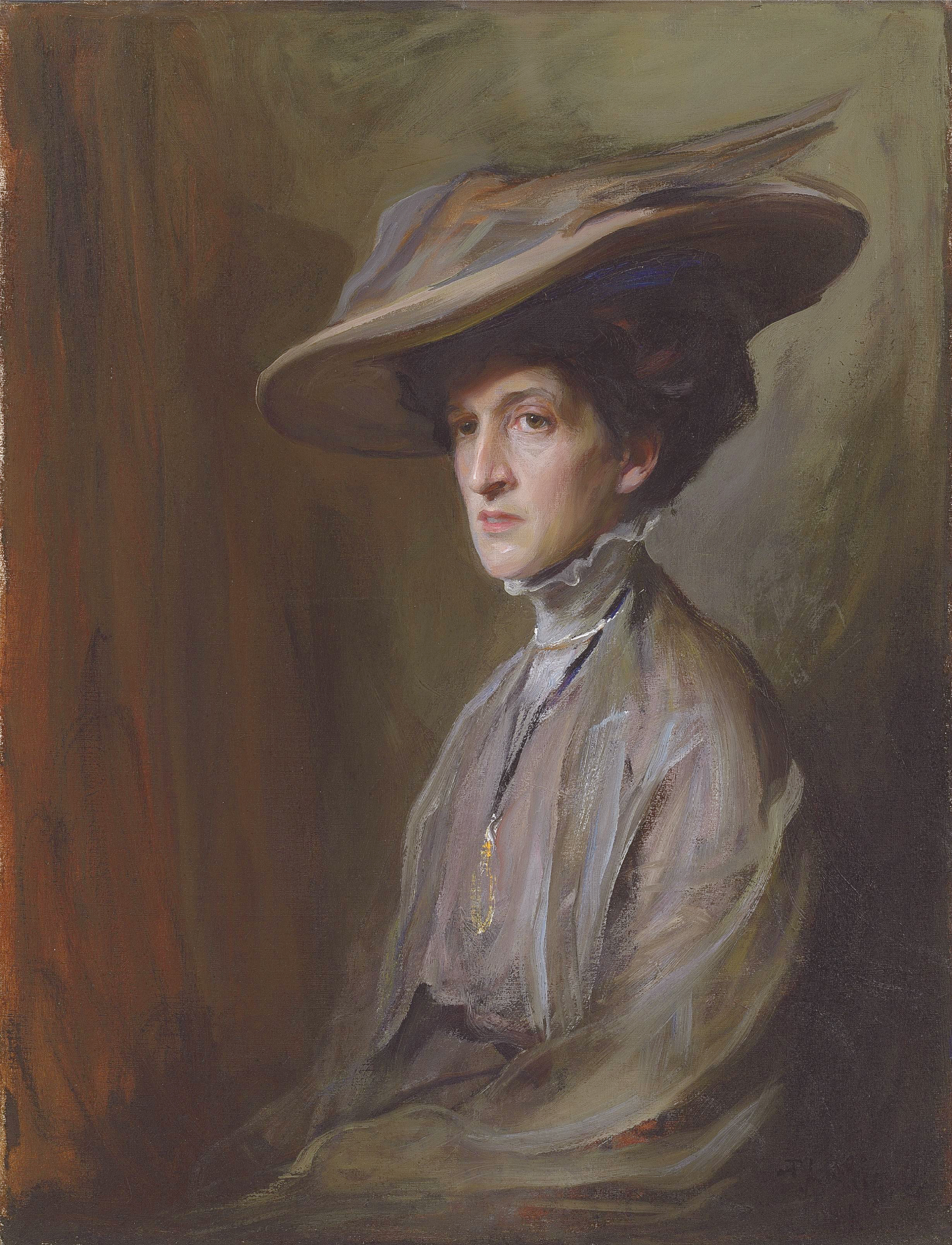
Margot Asquith, painting by Philip de László, 1909

On 10 May 1894, Asquith married H. H. Asquith and became a "spur to his ambition". She brought him into the glittering social world, which he had in no way experienced with his first wife, who Asquith had known and always spoke of warmly. Asquith also became an unenthusiastic stepmother to five children, who were bemused by Asquith, who was so different from their quiet mother. Violet Asquith wrote: "She flashed into our lives like some dazzling bird of paradise, filling us with amazement, amusement, excitement, sometimes with a vague uneasiness as to what she might do next." In 1908, when Asquith became prime minister, Violet was the only child of his first wife still at home, and the two shared a deep interest in politics. In contrast, relations between stepmother and stepdaughter were frequently strained, prompting H. H. Asquith to write lamentingly of how the two were "on terms of chronic misunderstanding".

Asquith bore five children of her own, two of them surviving infancy. Elizabeth Asquith, born in 1897, later married Prince Antoine Bibesco of Romania in 1919 and became a writer of some note. Anthony Asquith, born in 1902, became a leading English film director.

Until they moved to the prime minister's residence at 10 Downing Street in 1908, the Asquith home was a huge house in Cavendish Square in London, with a staff of 14 servants. The residence of most importance in the life of the Asquiths was The Wharf in Sutton Courtenay, Oxfordshire, built in 1912. It became their weekend home away from home, and it was there that literary, artistic and political luminaries would gather.

== Views on suffrage and politics ==
Her husband was in office as British prime minister from April 1908 to December 1916.

Asquith was a staunch opponent of women's suffrage, once saying in a letter that "women have no reason, very little humour, hardly any sense of honour... and no sense of proportion". In 1909, on holiday in Clovelly Court, Devon, the Asquiths were followed by suffragettes Elsie Howey, Jessie Kenney and Vera Wentworth, whom Asquith recognised again at church. They also hid in her garden, covering plants with the colours of the movement: purple, white and green. With other politicians' wives, she attended the debate on the aborted Conciliation Bill and, in 1911, she "seemed highly amused at the earnestness" of women's suffrage lobbyists, whilst near to Constance Lytton and Annie Kenney, who remembered her as unpleasant and sarcastic. In 1912, an article in the newspaper Votes for Women told of Asquith's "stealth" journey when travelling with her husband as prime minister, via Wolverhampton and the Holyhead ferry, to Dublin, where the ferry was met by a yacht of Irish Women's Franchise League demanding the female vote be included in the Irish Home Rule Bill.

During World War I, Asquith's outspokenness led to a public outcry. For example, she visited a German prisoner of war camp, and she accused her shell-shocked stepson, Herbert, of being drunk. The negative public and media response may well have contributed to the political downfall of her husband.

In 1918, she was publicly attacked in court by Noel Pemberton Billing, a right-wing MP, who was convinced that the nation's war effort was being undermined by homosexuality in high society. He hinted that she was associated with the conspirators. Billing also published a poem, written by Lord Alfred Douglas, which referred to "merry Margot, bound With Lesbian fillets".

== After the war ==
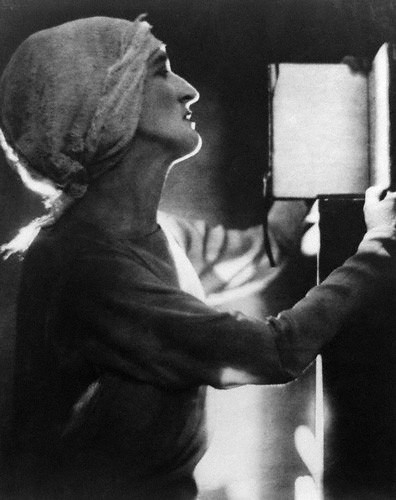
Portrait by Adolf de Meyer

In 1920, the mansion in Cavendish Square was sold and the Asquiths moved to 44 Bedford Square, a beautiful house formerly occupied by salonière Ottoline Morrell. She became Countess of Oxford and Asquith in 1925 when her husband was granted a peerage.

== Writings ==
Asquith published her autobiography in 1920. Her writing style was not always critically accepted—the most famous review of Asquith's work came from New York wit Dorothy Parker, who wrote, "The affair between Margot Asquith and Margot Asquith will live as one of the prettiest love stories in all literature". Asquith's autobiography was part of a new trend of revelatory political books written close in time to the events described, including Lytton Strachey’s Eminent Victorians in 1918, John Maynard Keynes' The Economic Consequences of the Peace in 1919 and Lord Beaverbrook’s Politicians and the War in 1928. In 1921, humorist Barry Pain published a book called Marge Askinforit, described on the cover as "a rollicking skit on the Margot Asquith memoirs". Pain wrote in his author's note that "There was a quality in that autobiography which seemed to demand parody."

Asquith was known for her outspokenness and acerbic wit. A possibly apocryphal but typical story has her meeting the American film actress Jean Harlow and correcting Harlow's mispronunciation of her first name – "No, no; the 't' is silent, as in 'Harlow'." The story was recorded by the Liberal MP Robert Bernays in his diary entry for 26 June 1934, but Bernays does not claim to have witnessed the alleged encounter himself.

=== Publication of her diaries ===
In June 2014 her First World War diaries were published by Oxford University Press as Margot Asquith's Great War Diary 1914-1916: The View from Downing Street, selected and edited by Michael and Eleanor Brock, with the assistance of Mark Pottle.

=== List of publications ===
- The Autobiography Of Margot Asquith, 1920
- A Little Journey, 1921
- The Autobiography Of Margot Asquith. Volume II, 1922
- My Impressions of America, 1922
- Places & Persons, 1925
- Lay Sermons, 1927
- Octavia, 1928
- More Memories, 1933
- More or Less about Myself, 1934
- Off the Record, 1943
- Margot Asquith's Great War Diary 1914-1916: The View from Downing Street, eds. M. & E. Brock, 2014

== Later years ==
In the late 1920s, Asquith and her husband were seriously in debt: she admitted to owing £15,000 (equivalent to £815,000 in 2025) and having pawned her pearls for £2,000 despite, she claimed, having made £18,000 from books and £10,000 from various writings. A whip-round of Liberal sympathisers had to be organised to provide for them.

Her husband left her only £300 (equivalent to £16,000 in 2025) on his death in 1928 as he had to use his life insurance to provide for his children. She was left in near penury and her financial position caused her constant concern. Thereafter she made money by advising on "matters of taste" in interior design and advertising Wix cigarettes, often issued "IOU"s which she hoped would never be cashed and, beginning before her husband's death, was given regular gifts of money by Lord Beaverbrook. After her husband's death, Asquith slowly moved down the residential rungs to rooms at the Savoy Hotel. Her final home was in Thurloe Place, Kensington. She told Harold Nicolson that Neville Chamberlain was "the greatest Englishman that ever lived" for signing the Munich Agreement.

Her final overwhelming sadness was the separation from her daughter Elizabeth, who had been trapped in Bucharest since 1940. Asquith schemed for her rescue, but Elizabeth died of pneumonia in April 1945; heartbroken, she outlived her daughter by three months.

== Arms ==
Coat of arms of Margot Asquith
Escutcheon The arms of The Earl of Oxford & Aquith (Sable on a fess between three cross-crosslets argent a portcullis of the field) impaled with the arms of Tennant baronets of The Glen & St Rollox (Argent, two crescents in fess sable on a chief gules a boar's head couped of the first).

== In literature and popular culture ==
Asquith's autobiographical revelations about her boisterous youth and early suitors were satirised by Neil Munro in his Erchie MacPherson story, "Reminiscences", first published in the Glasgow Evening News on 8 November 1920.

== Bibliography ==
- Abdy, Jane; Gere, Charlotte (1984). The Souls. Sidgwick & Jackson. ISBN 978-0-283-98920-9.
- de Courcy, Anne. Margot at War: Love and Betrayal in Downing Street, 1912-1916 (Weidenfeld & Nicolson, 2014) ISBN 978-0-297-86983-2
- Ellenberger, Nancy W. Balfour's World: Aristocracy and Political Culture at the Fin de Siècle (2015). excerpt
- Heathorn, Stephen (2013). Haig and Kitchener in Twentieth-Century Britain: Remembrance, Representation and Appropriation. Routledge. ISBN 978-0-75466-965-4.
- Jenkins, Roy (1964). Asquith (first ed.). London: Collins. OCLC 243906913.
- Koss, Stephen (1985). Asquith. London: Hamish Hamilton. ISBN 978-0-231-06155-1.
