= List of awards and nominations received by Helena Bonham Carter =

Helena Bonham Carter awards and nominations
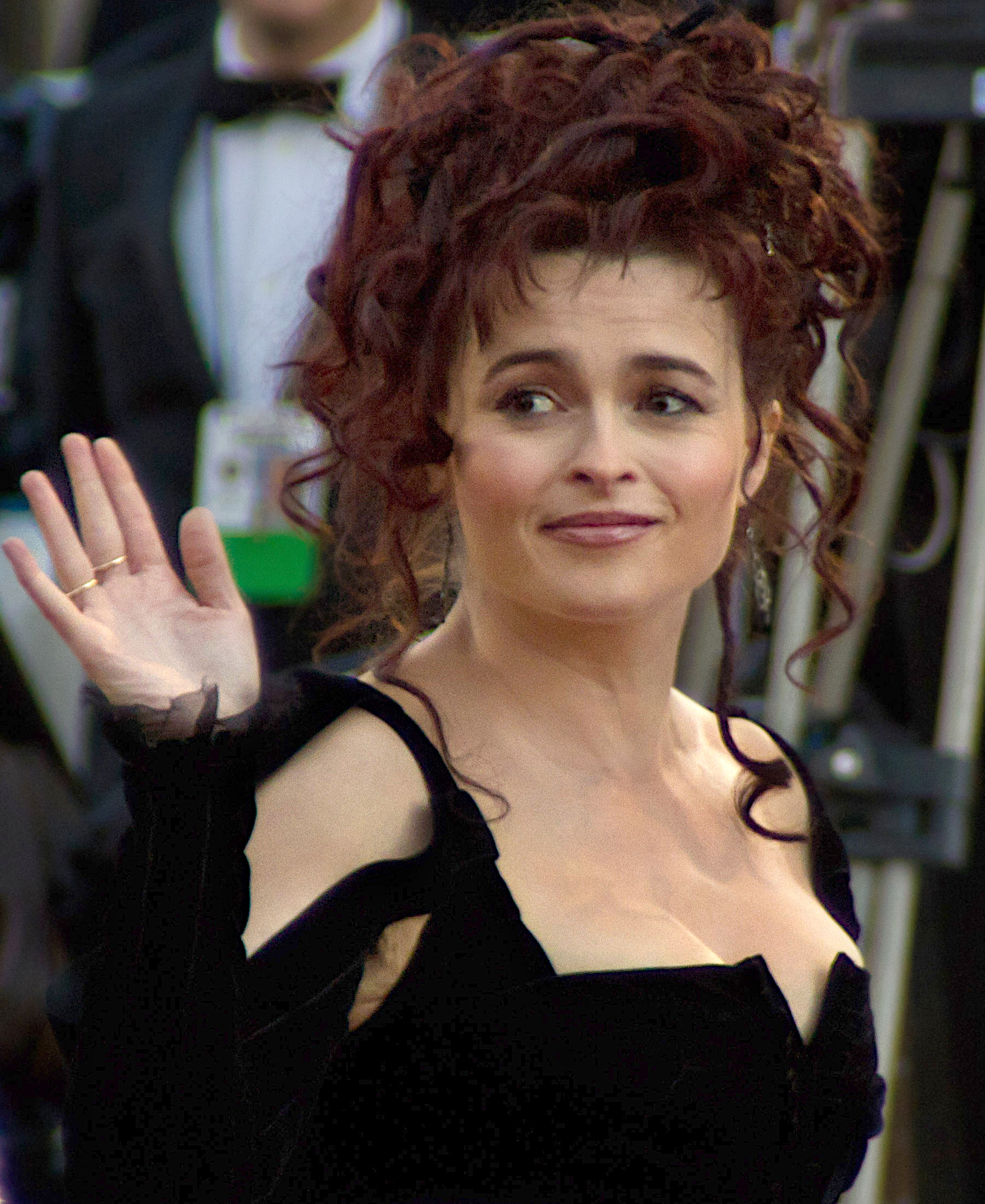
- Bonham Carter at the 2011 Academy Awards
Awards and nominations
Award	Wins	Nominations
Academy Awards	0	2
Actor Awards	3	8
BAFTA Awards	1	8
Golden Globe Awards	0	9
Emmy Awards	1	6

Totals (Note: Certain award groups do not simply award one winner. They acknowledge several different recipients, have runners-up, and have third place. Since this is a specific recognition and is different from losing an award, runner-up mentions are considered wins in this award tally. For simplification and to avoid errors, each award in this list has been presumed to have had a prior nomination.)
- Wins: 38
- Nominations: 117

Helena Bonham Carter is an English actress. She has received many accolades including three Actor Awards, a British Academy Film Award, an International Emmy Award, as well as nominations for two Academy Awards, four British Academy Television Awards, nine Golden Globe Awards, and five Primetime Emmy Awards. Bonham Carter was made a CBE in the 2012 New Year Honours list for services to drama, and Prime Minister David Cameron announced that she had been appointed to Britain's new national Holocaust Commission in January 2014.

She gained acclaim for her role as Helena Schlegel in Howards End (1992) for which she was nominated for a BAFTA Award for Best Actress in a Supporting Role. She received Academy Award nominations for Best Actress for her role as Kate Croy in the period drama The Wings of the Dove (1997), and for Best Supporting Actress for her portrayal of Queen Elizabeth in the historical drama The Kings Speech (2010). For the later role she also received a BAFTA Award for Best Actress in a Supporting Role as well as nominations for a Golden Globe Award for Best Supporting Actress – Motion Picture and an Actor Award for Outstanding Performance by a Female Actor in a Supporting Role. She received a Golden Globe Award for Best Actress in a Motion Picture – Musical or Comedy nomination for her role as Mrs. Lovett in Sweeney Todd: The Demon Barber of Fleet Street (2007) and an Actor Award for Outstanding Performance by a Cast in a Motion Picture for her role as Madame Thénardier in the musical Les Misérables (2012).

Bonham Carter is also known for her television roles, earning the International Emmy Award for Best Actress for her role as children's author Enid Blyton in Enid (2009). She received nomination for the Golden Globe Award for Best Actress – Miniseries or Television Film for portraying Marina Oswald Porter in the NBC film Fatal Deception: Mrs. Lee Harvey Oswald (1993) and Primetime Emmy Award nominations for her roles as Morgan le Fay in the NBC miniseries Merlin (1998), Ingrid Formanek in the HBO movie Live from Baghdad (2002), and Elizabeth Taylor in BBC television film Burton & Taylor (2013). For her portrayal of Princess Margaret, Countess of Snowdon in the Netflix drama series The Crown she received nominations for two Primetime Emmy Award for Outstanding Supporting Actress in a Drama Series, and two Golden Globe Award for Best Supporting Actress – Series, Miniseries or Television Film as well as two wins for the Actor Award for Outstanding Performance by an Ensemble in a Drama Series.

== Major associations ==
=== Academy Awards ===
Year	Category	Nominated work	Result	Ref.
1998	Best Actress	The Wings of the Dove	Nominated	
2011	Best Supporting Actress	The King's Speech	Nominated	

=== Actor Awards ===
Year	Category	Nominated work	Result	Ref.
1997	Outstanding Performance by a Female Actor in a Leading Role	The Wings of the Dove	Nominated	
2010	Outstanding Performance by a Female Actor in a Supporting Role	The King's Speech	Nominated	
2010	Outstanding Performance by a Cast in a Motion Picture	The King's Speech	Won	
2012	Outstanding Performance by a Cast in a Motion Picture	Les Misérables	Nominated	
2013	Outstanding Performance by a Female Actor in a Miniseries or Television Movie	Burton & Taylor	Nominated	
2019	Outstanding Performance by a Female Actor in a Drama Series	The Crown	Nominated	
2019	Outstanding Performance by an Ensemble in a Drama Series	The Crown	Won	
2020	Outstanding Performance by an Ensemble in a Drama Series	The Crown	Won	

=== BAFTA Awards ===
Year	Category	Nominated work	Result	Ref.
British Academy Film Awards
1992	Best Actress in a Supporting Role	Howards End	Nominated	
1997	Best Actress in a Leading Role	The Wings of the Dove	Nominated	
2010	Best Actress in a Supporting Role	The King's Speech	Won	
British Academy Television Awards
2010	Best Actress	Enid	Nominated	
2014	Best Actress	Burton & Taylor	Nominated	
2020	Best Supporting Actress	The Crown	Nominated	
2021	Best Supporting Actress	The Crown	Nominated	
2024	Best Actress	Nolly	Nominated	

=== Golden Globe Awards ===
Year	Category	Nominated work	Result	Ref.
1993	Best Actress – Miniseries or Television Film	Fatal Deception: Mrs. Lee Harvey Oswald	Nominated	
1997	Best Actress in a Motion Picture – Drama	The Wings of the Dove	Nominated	
1998	Best Supporting Actress – Series, Miniseries or TV Movie	Merlin	Nominated	
2002	Best Actress – Miniseries or Television Film	Live from Baghdad	Nominated	
2007	Best Actress in a Motion Picture – Comedy or Musical	Sweeney Todd: The Demon Barber of Fleet Street	Nominated	
2010	Best Supporting Actress – Motion Picture	The King's Speech	Nominated	
2013	Best Actress – Miniseries or Television Film	Burton & Taylor	Nominated	
2019	Best Supporting Actress – Series, Miniseries or TV Movie	The Crown	Nominated	
2020	Best Supporting Actress – Series, Miniseries or TV Movie	The Crown	Nominated	

=== Emmy Awards ===
Year	Category	Nominated work	Result	Ref.
Primetime Emmy Awards
1997	Outstanding Supporting Actress in a Limited Series or Movie	Merlin	Nominated	
2003	Outstanding Lead Actress in a Limited Series or Movie	Live from Baghdad	Nominated	
2014	Outstanding Lead Actress in a Limited Series or Movie	Burton & Taylor	Nominated	
2020	Outstanding Supporting Actress in a Drama Series	The Crown	Nominated	
2021	Outstanding Supporting Actress in a Drama Series	The Crown	Nominated	
International Emmy Awards
2010	Best Actress	Enid	Won	

== Miscellaneous awards ==
=== Alliance of Women Film Journalists ===
Year	Category	Nominated work	Result	Ref.
2011	Best Ensemble Cast	The King's Speech	Nominated	
2011	Best Supporting Actress	The King's Speech	Nominated	

=== Annie Awards ===
Year	Category	Nominated work	Result	Ref.
2005	Best Voice Acting in a Feature Production	Wallace & Gromit: The Curse of the Were-Rabbit	Nominated	

=== British Independent Film Awards ===
Year	Category	Nominated work	Result	Ref.
2003	Best Performance by an Actress in a British Independent Film	The Heart of Me	Nominated	
2010	The Richard Harris Award		Won	
2010	Best Supporting Actress	The King's Speech	Won	
2015	Best Supporting Actress	Suffragette	Nominated	

=== Broadcasting Press Guild ===
Year	Category	Nominated work	Result	Ref.
2010	Best Actress	Enid	Nominated	
2011	Best Actress	Toast	Nominated	

=== Comedy Film Awards ===
Year	Category	Nominated work	Result	Ref.
2010	Best Actress in a Supporting Role	Alice in Wonderland	Nominated	

=== Evening Standard British Film Awards ===
Year	Category	Nominated work	Result	Ref.
2007	Best Actress	Sweeney Todd: The Demon Barber of Fleet Street	Won	
2007	Best Actress	Conversations with Other Women	Won	

=== Genie Awards ===
Year	Category	Nominated work	Result	Ref.
1995	Best Performance by an Actress in a Leading Role	Margaret's Museum	Won	

=== Irish Film & Television Academy Awards ===
Year	Category	Nominated work	Result	Ref.
2010	Best International Actress	The King's Speech	Nominated	

=== Italian Online Movie Awards ===
Year	Category	Nominated work	Result	Ref.
2008	Best Actress in a Supporting Role	Sweeney Todd: The Demon Barber of Fleet Street	Nominated	
2011	Best Actress in a Supporting Role	The King's Speech	Won	

=== National Board of Review ===
Year	Category	Nominated work	Result	Ref.
1997	Best Actress	The Wings of the Dove	Won	
2012	Best Acting by an Ensemble	Les Misérables	Won	

=== National Movie Awards ===
Year	Category	Nominated work	Result	Ref.
2008	Best Performance – Female	Sweeney Todd: The Demon Barber of Fleet Street	Nominated	
2010	Performance of the Year	Alice in Wonderland	Nominated	
2011	Performance of the Year	The King's Speech	Nominated	

=== Satellite Awards ===
Year	Category	Nominated work	Result	Ref.
1997	Best Actress – Motion Picture	The Wings of the Dove	Nominated	
1998	Best Actress – Motion Picture	The Theory of Flight	Nominated	
2012	Best Cast – Motion Picture	Les Misérables	Won	
2013	Best Actress – Miniseries or Television Film	Burton & Taylor	Nominated	

=== Saturn Awards ===
Year	Category	Nominated work	Result	Ref.
1994	Best Actress	Mary Shelley's Frankenstein	Nominated	
2001	Best Supporting Actress	Planet of the Apes	Nominated	
2007	Best Actress	Sweeney Todd: The Demon Barber of Fleet Street	Nominated	

=== Zee Cine Awards ===
Year	Category	Nominated work	Result	Ref.
2006	Best Voice Actress	Wallace & Gromit: The Curse of the Were-Rabbit	Won	

== Critic associations ==
=== Boston Society of Film Critics ===
Year	Category	Nominated work	Result	Ref.
1997	Best Actress	The Wings of the Dove	Won	

=== Central Ohio Film Critics Association ===
Year	Category	Nominated work	Result	Ref.
2012	Best Ensemble	Les Misérables	Nominated	

=== Chicago Film Critics Association ===
Year	Category	Nominated work	Result	Ref.
1997	Best Actress	The Wings of the Dove	Nominated	
2010	Best Supporting Actress	The King's Speech	Nominated	

=== Critics' Choice Movie Awards ===
Critics' Choice Movie Awards
Year	Category	Nominated work	Result	Ref.
1997	Best Actress	The Wings of the Dove	Won	
2007	Best Acting Ensemble	Sweeney Todd: The Demon Barber of Fleet Street	Nominated	
2010	Best Supporting Actress	The King's Speech	Nominated	
2010	Best Acting Ensemble	The King's Speech	Nominated	
2011	Best Acting Ensemble	Les Misérables	Nominated	
Critics' Choice Television Awards
2014	Best Actress in a Movie/Miniseries	Burton & Taylor	Nominated	
2019	Best Supporting Actress in a Drama Series	The Crown	Nominated	

=== Dallas–Fort Worth Film Critics Association ===
Year	Category	Nominated work	Result	Ref.
1997	Best Actress	The Wings of the Dove	Won	
2010	Best Supporting Actress	The King's Speech	Nominated	

=== Denver Film Critics Society ===
Year	Category	Nominated work	Result	Ref.
2010	Best Supporting Actress	The King's Speech	Nominated	

=== Detroit Film Critics Society ===
Year	Category	Nominated work	Result	Ref.
2010	Best Supporting Actress	The King's Speech	Nominated	

=== Houston Film Critics Society ===
Year	Category	Nominated work	Result	Ref.
2010	Best Performance by an Actress in a Supporting Role	The King's Speech	Nominated	

=== Iowa Film Critics ===
Year	Category	Nominated work	Result	Ref.
2010	Best Supporting Actress	The King's Speech	Nominated	

=== Kansas City Film Critics Circle ===
Year	Category	Nominated work	Result	Ref.
1997	Best Actress	The Wings of the Dove	Won	

=== Las Vegas Film Critics Society ===
Year	Category	Nominated work	Result	Ref.
1997	Best Actress	The Wings of the Dove	Won	

=== London Film Critics' Circle ===
Year	Category	Nominated work	Result	Ref.
1998	British Actress of the Year	The Wings of the Dove	Won	
2007	British Actress of the Year	Sweeney Todd: The Demon Barber of Fleet Street	Nominated	
2010	British Actress of the Year	The King's Speech	Nominated	
2010	British Supporting Actress of the Year	Alice in Wonderland	Nominated	
2012	Dilys Powell Award		Won	

=== Los Angeles Film Critics Association ===
Year	Category	Nominated work	Result	Ref.
1997	Best Actress	The Wings of the Dove	Won	

=== National Society of Film Critics ===
Year	Category	Nominated work	Result	Ref.
1997	Best Actress	The Wings of the Dove	Nominated	

=== New York Film Critics Circle ===
Year	Category	Nominated work	Result	Ref.
1997	Best Actress	The Wings of the Dove	Nominated	

=== North Texas Film Critics Association ===
Year	Category	Nominated work	Result	Ref.
2010	Best Supporting Actress	The King's Speech	Nominated	

=== Online Film Critics Society ===
Year	Category	Nominated work	Result	Ref.
1997	Best Actress	The Wings of the Dove	Nominated	

=== Phoenix Film Critics Society ===
Year	Category	Nominated work	Result	Ref.
2010	The King's Speech	Best Supporting Actress	Nominated	
2010	The King's Speech	Best Ensemble Acting	Nominated	
2012	Les Misérables	Best Ensemble Acting	Nominated	

=== San Diego Film Critics Society ===
Year	Category	Nominated work	Result	Ref.
2011	Best Performance by an Ensemble	Harry Potter and the Deathly Hallows – Part 2	Won	
2012	Best Performance by an Ensemble	Les Misérables	Nominated	

=== Society of Texas Film Critics Awards ===
Year	Category	Nominated work	Result	Ref.
1997	Best Actress	The Wings of the Dove	Won	

=== Southeastern Film Critics Association ===
Year	Category	Nominated work	Result	Ref.
1997	Best Actress	The Wings of the Dove	Won	

=== St. Louis Film Critics Association ===
Year	Category	Nominated work	Result	Ref.
2010	Best Supporting Actress	The King's Speech	Nominated	

=== Toronto Film Critics Association ===
Year	Category	Nominated work	Result	Ref.
1997	Best Actress	The Wings of the Dove	Won	

=== Washington D.C. Area Film Critics Association ===
Year	Category	Nominated work	Result	Ref.
2010	Best Supporting Actress	The King's Speech	Nominated	
2011	Best Ensemble	Harry Potter and the Deathly Hallows – Part 2	Nominated	
2012	Best Ensemble	Les Misérables	Won	

== Festival awards ==
=== Beijing Film Festival Awards ===
Year	Category	Nominated work	Result	Ref.
2012	Best Supporting Actress	Great Expectations	Won	

=== Boston Film Festival ===
Year	Category	Nominated work	Result	Ref.
1997	Film Excellence Award		Won	

=== Fantasporto: International Fantasy Film Awards ===
Year	Category	Nominated work	Result	Ref.
1996	Best Actress	Margaret's Museum	Won	

=== Hollywood Film Festival Awards ===
Year	Category	Nominated work	Result	Ref.
2010	Supporting Actress of the Year	The King's Speech	Won	

=== Santa Barbara International Film Festival ===
Year	Category	Nominated work	Result	Ref.
2010	Best Ensemble Cast	The King's Speech	Won	

=== Tokyo International Film Festival ===
Year	Category	Nominated work	Result	Ref.
2005	Best Actress	Conversations with Other Women	Won	

== Audience awards ==
=== Empire Awards ===
Year	Category	Nominated work	Result	Ref.
2000	Best British Actress	Fight Club	Won	
2002	Best British Actress	Planet of the Apes	Nominated	
2009	Best Actress	Sweeney Todd: The Demon Barber of Fleet Street	Won	
2011	Best Actress	The King's Speech	Nominated	

=== IGN Movie Awards ===
Year	Category	Nominated work	Result	Ref.
2011	Best Ensemble Cast	Harry Potter and the Deathly Hallows – Part 2	Nominated	

=== MTV Movie & TV Awards ===
Year	Category	Nominated work	Result	Ref.
2010	Best Villain	Alice in Wonderland	Nominated	
2012	Best Cast	Harry Potter and the Deathly Hallows – Part 2	Won	

=== Nickelodeon Kids' Choice Awards ===
Year	Category	Nominated work	Result	Ref.
2017	Favorite Villain	Alice Through the Looking Glass	Nominated	

=== People's Choice Awards ===
Year	Category	Nominated work	Result	Ref.
2011	Favourite Ensemble Film Cast	Harry Potter and the Deathly Hallows – Part 2	Won	

=== Scream Awards ===
Year	Category	Nominated work	Result	Ref.
2007	Scream Queen	Harry Potter and the Order of the Phoenix	Nominated	
2008	Best Horror Actress	Sweeney Todd: The Demon Barber of Fleet Street	Nominated	
2009	Best Ensemble	Harry Potter and the Half-Blood Prince	Won	
2009	Best Villain	Harry Potter and the Half-Blood Prince	Nominated	
2009	Best Cameo	Terminator Salvation	Nominated	
2011	Best Ensemble	Harry Potter and the Deathly Hallows – Part 2	Nominated	
