= Jo Grimond =

British soldier, politician and academic (1913-1993)

The Right Honourable The Lord Grimond TD PC
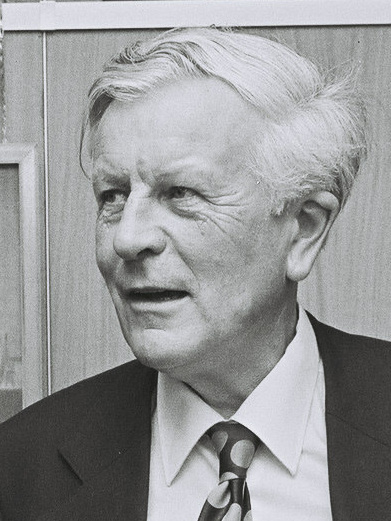
- Grimond in 1976

Leader of the Liberal Party
- Acting
- In office 10 May 1976 – 7 July 1976
- Preceded by: Jeremy Thorpe
- Succeeded by: David Steel
- In office 5 November 1956 – 17 January 1967
- Deputy: Donald Wade (1960–1964)
- Preceded by: Clement Davies
- Succeeded by: Jeremy Thorpe

Liberal Chief Whip
- In office 23 March 1950 – 5 November 1956
- Leader: Clement Davies
- Preceded by: Frank Byers
- Succeeded by: Donald Wade

Member of the House of Lords
- Lord Temporal
- Life peerage 12 October 1983 – 24 October 1993

Member of Parliament for Orkney and Shetland
- In office 23 February 1950 – 13 May 1983
- Preceded by: Basil Neven-Spence
- Succeeded by: Jim Wallace

Personal details
- Born: Joseph Grimond; 29 July 1913 St Andrews, Fife, Scotland, UK
- Died: 24 October 1993 (aged 80) Glasgow, Scotland, UK
- Party: Liberal; Liberal Democrats
- Spouse: Laura Bonham Carter (m. 1938)
- Children: 4
- Parents: Joseph Grimond (father); Helen Richardson (mother)
- Education: Eton College, Balliol College, Oxford

Joseph Grimond, Baron Grimond, TD, PC (/ˈɡrɪmənd/; 29 July 1913 – 24 October 1993) was a British politician, leader of the Liberal Party for eleven years from 1956 to 1967 and again briefly on an interim basis in 1976.

Grimond was a long-term supporter of Scottish home rule; and, during his leadership, he successfully advocated for the Liberal Party to support the abolition of Britain's nuclear arsenal; although this did not happen.

== Early life ==
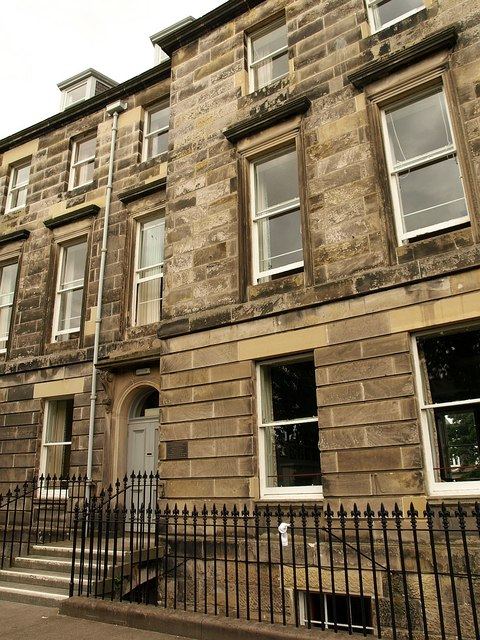
Grimond's birthplace

Grimond was born in St Andrews, Fife, to jute manufacturer Joseph Bowman Grimond and Helen Lydia, née Richardson. He was educated at Eton College and Balliol College, Oxford. He was at school and university with, among others, cricket commentator Brian Johnston and playwright William Douglas-Home. He received a first-class honours degree in Politics, Philosophy and Economics. He later became a barrister, being admitted to the bar as a member of Middle Temple.

== Political career ==
=== Member of Parliament ===
After serving as a major in World War II, he was selected by the Liberal Party to contest Orkney and Shetland, the most northerly constituency in the United Kingdom. He narrowly missed capturing the seat in 1945 but won it at the 1950 general election. The Liberals and their successors, the Liberal Democrats, have retained the seat continuously to the present day.

Grimond continued to represent the constituency until he retired from politics in 1983, and regularly polled more than 60% of the vote.

=== Leader of the Liberal Party ===
The party Grimond inherited from former leader Clement Davies had secured only 2.7% of the vote in the 1955 general election. However, this result represented a modest recovery in the Liberal Party's fortunes compared with its performance in 1951. Under Grimond's leadership, this progress continued. He helped restore the Liberals as a notable political force by the time he stepped down as leader in 1967.

It was during his tenure that the first post-war Liberal revival took place: under Grimond's leadership, the Liberals doubled their seat tally and won historic by-elections at Torrington in 1958 (the first by-election gain by the Liberal Party for 29 years), Orpington in 1962, and Roxburgh, Selkirk and Peebles in 1965.

In 1961-2, the Liberals almost succeeded in capturing Blackpool North, West Derbyshire and Chippenham from the Conservatives and Paisley and Leicester North East from Labour. Grimond's leadership proved attractive to many young aspiring politicians, including John Pardoe and three future party leaders, David Steel, Paddy Ashdown and Sir Menzies Campbell.

In 1967, having led the party through three general elections, he made way for a younger leader, the charismatic Jeremy Thorpe. In 1976, when Thorpe was forced to resign because of a scandal, Grimond stepped in as interim leader until the election of a replacement, David Steel.

Among other posts, Grimond was a barrister and publisher in the 1930s, an army major during World War II, Secretary of the National Trust for Scotland from 1947 to 1949, and held the Rectorships of the University of Edinburgh and the University of Aberdeen and the Chancellorship of the University of Kent at Canterbury (elected in 1970). His many books include The Liberal Future (1959, credited with reinvigorating radical liberalism as a coherent modern ideology), The Liberal Challenge (1963), and Memoirs (1979).

He was the subject of This Is Your Life in 1983 when he was surprised by Eamonn Andrews.

=== Retirement and death ===
Upon leaving the House of Commons, he was created a life peer as Baron Grimond, of Firth in the County of Orkney on 12 October 1983. He remained devoted to his former parliamentary constituency, and was buried in Finstown on Orkney.

== Marriage and children ==
In 1938, Grimond married Liberal politician Laura Bonham Carter (1918–1994). His wife was the granddaughter of the former Liberal Prime Minister H. H. Asquith, and the daughter of the influential Liberal politician and peer Violet Asquith (1887–1969) and her politician and civil servant husband, Maurice Bonham Carter. Laura Grimond was also the sister of another life peer, Mark Bonham Carter (1922–1994), who won the 1958 by-election at Torrington for the Liberal Party. The couple had four children:

- (Joseph) Andrew Grimond (26 March 1939 – 23 March 1966), a sub-editor of The Scotsman, who lived in Edinburgh until his suicide at the age of 26.
- Grizelda "Gelda" (Jane) Grimond (1942–2017), who had a daughter Katherine (born 1973) by the film and stage director Tony Richardson. Her daughter, Katherine, is married to Steven Hess, and had three children as of 2017.
- John (Jasper) Grimond (born October 1946), a former foreign editor of The Economist as Johnny Grimond, now writer-at-large for the publication, who in 1973 married Kate Fleming (born 1946), eldest daughter of the writer Peter Fleming and actress Celia Johnson, and the couple have three children together. He is the main author of The Economist Style Guide.
- (Thomas) Magnus Grimond (born 13 June 1959), journalist and financial correspondent, married to travel author Laura Grimond (née Raison), and has four children.

== Writings ==
- The Liberal Future (Faber and Faber, London, 1959)
- The Liberal Challenge (Hollis and Carter, London, 1963)
- (with Brian Nevel) The Referendum (Rex Collings, London, 1975)
- The Common Welfare (Temple Smith, London, 1978)
- Memoirs (Heinemann, London, 1979)
- A Personal Manifesto (Martin Robertson, Oxford, 1983)
- The St. Andrews of Jo Grimond (Alan Sutton, St. Andrew's, 1992)

Grimond was also a prolific writer of pamphlets: see the McManus biography (below) for a complete list of publications.

== Sources ==
- Peter Barberis, Liberal Lion: Jo Grimond, A Political Life (I.B. Tauris, London, 2005)
- Jo Grimond (Lord Grimond) 1913–93 biography from the Liberal Democrat History Group

Parliament of the United Kingdom
Preceded by Sir Basil Neven-Spence	Member of Parliament for Orkney and Shetland; 1950–1983	Succeeded by Jim Wallace
Party political offices
Preceded by Frank Byers	Liberal Chief Whip; 1950–1956	Succeeded by Donald Wade
Preceded by Clement Davies	Leader of the Liberal Party; 1956–1967	Succeeded by Jeremy Thorpe
Preceded by Jeremy Thorpe	Leader of the Liberal Party; Acting; 1976	Succeeded by David Steel
Academic offices
Preceded by James Robertson Justice	Rector of the University of Edinburgh; 1960–1963	Succeeded by James Robertson Justice
Preceded by Frank George Thomson	Rector of the University of Aberdeen; 1969–1972	Succeeded by Michael Barratt
Preceded by Princess Marina, Duchess of Kent	Chancellor of the University of Kent; 1970–1990	Succeeded by Sir Robert Horton
