= Helena Bonham Carter =

British actress (born 1966)

Helena Bonham Carter CBE
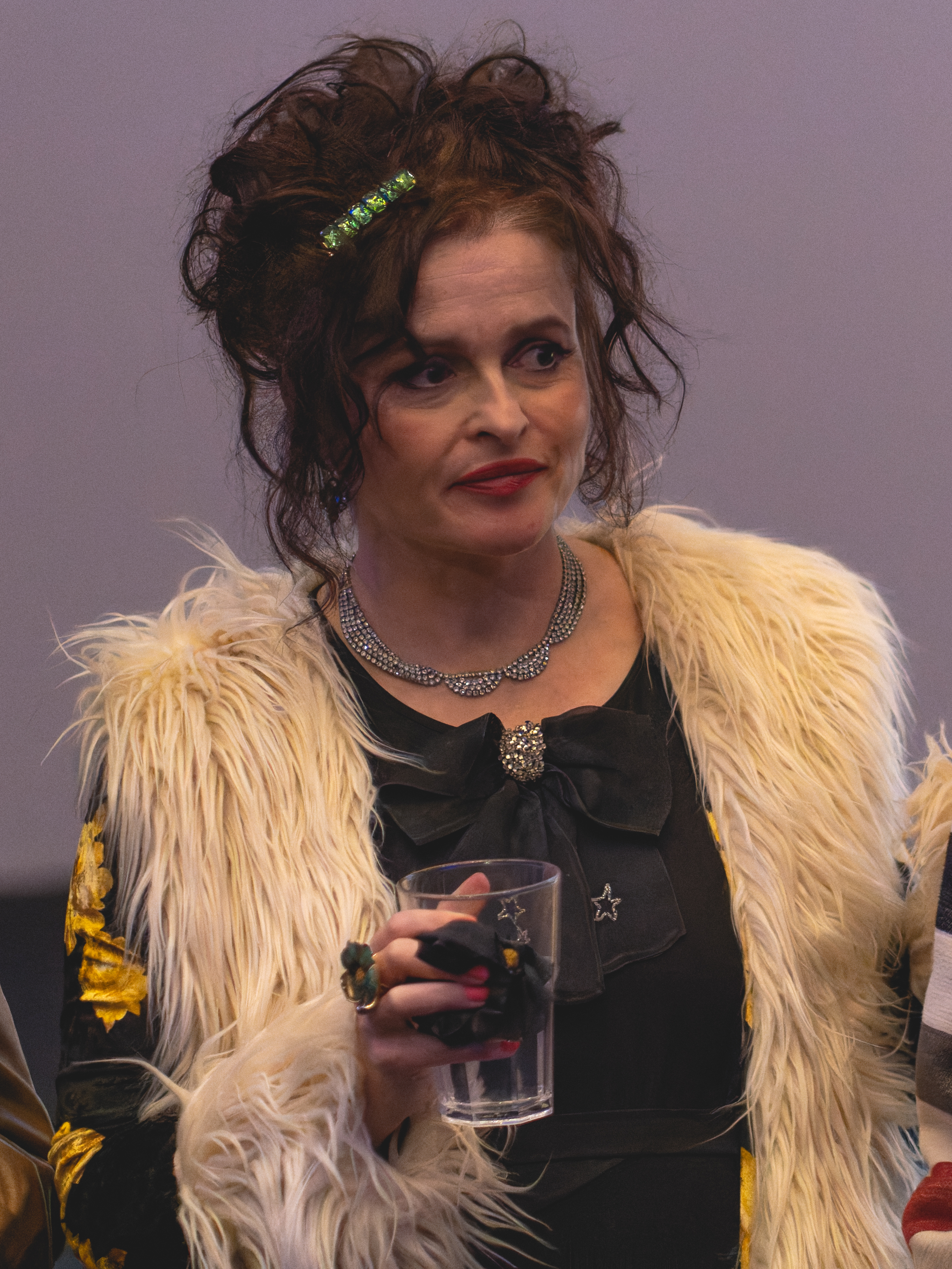
- Bonham Carter in 2024
- Born: 26 May 1966 (age 60); London, England
- Occupation: Actress
- Years active: 1983–present
- Works: Full list
- Partners: Kenneth Branagh (1994–1999); Tim Burton (2001–2014); Rye Dag Holmboe (2018–present)
- Children: 2
- Father: Raymond Bonham Carter
- Relatives: Edward Bonham Carter (brother)
- Family: Bonham Carter
- Awards: Full list

Helena Bonham Carter (born 26 May 1966) is a British actress. She is known for her character roles as eccentric women in blockbusters and independent films, particularly period dramas. Bonham Carter rose to prominence by playing Lucy Honeychurch in A Room with a View (1985) and the title character in Lady Jane (1986). Her early period roles saw her typecast as a virginal "English rose", a label with which she was uncomfortable. Bonham Carter is recognized for her unconventional and eccentric fashion choices and dark gothic aesthetic along with her collaborations with filmmaker Tim Burton. For her role as Kate Croy in The Wings of the Dove (1997), Bonham Carter received a nomination for the Academy Award for Best Actress, and for her portrayal of Queen Elizabeth in The King's Speech (2010), she won the BAFTA Award for Best Actress in a Supporting Role, and was nominated for the Academy Award for Best Supporting Actress.

Bonham Carter's other films include Hamlet (1990), Howards End (1992), Mary Shelley's Frankenstein (1994), Mighty Aphrodite (1995), Fight Club (1999), Wallace & Gromit: The Curse of the Were-Rabbit (2005), the Harry Potter series as Bellatrix Lestrange (2007–2011), Terminator Salvation (2009), Great Expectations (2012) as Miss Havisham, Les Misérables (2012), Cinderella (2015), Ocean's 8 (2018), and Enola Holmes (2020). Her collaborations with director and ex-husband Tim Burton include Planet of the Apes (2001), Big Fish (2003), Corpse Bride (2005), Charlie and the Chocolate Factory (2005), Sweeney Todd: The Demon Barber of Fleet Street (2007), Alice in Wonderland (2010), and Dark Shadows (2012).

For her role as children's author Enid Blyton in the BBC Four biographical film Enid (2009), Bonham Carter won the 2010 International Emmy Award for Best Actress and was nominated for the British Academy Television Award for Best Actress. Her other television films include Fatal Deception: Mrs. Lee Harvey Oswald (1993), Live from Baghdad (2002), Toast (2010), and Burton & Taylor (2013). From 2019 to 2020, Bonham Carter portrayed Princess Margaret in seasons three and four of Netflix's The Crown, earning two Primetime Emmy Award nominations.

== Early life ==
Bonham Carter was born in London. Her father, Raymond Bonham Carter, who came from a prominent British political family, was a merchant banker and served as the alternative British director representing the Bank of England at the International Monetary Fund in Washington, DC, during the 1960s. Her mother, Elena (née Propper de Callejón), is a psychotherapist of Spanish and mostly Bohemian and French-Jewish background, and her parents were the diplomat Eduardo Propper de Callejón from Spain and the painter Baroness Hélène Fould-Springer. Bonham Carter's paternal grandmother was politician and feminist Violet Bonham Carter, daughter of H. H. Asquith, the prime minister of the United Kingdom during the first half of the First World War.

Bonham Carter has two older brothers, Edward and Thomas. They were brought up in Golders Green, and she was educated at South Hampstead High School and completed her A-levels at Westminster School. Bonham Carter applied to King's College, Cambridge, but was rejected "because officials were afraid that she would leave mid-term to pursue an acting career."

When Bonham Carter was five, her mother had a serious nervous breakdown, from which she needed three years to recover. Soon afterwards, her mother's experiences in therapy led her to become a psychotherapist herself. Bonham Carter has since paid her to read her scripts and deliver opinions on the characters' psychological motivations. Five years after her mother's recovery, her father was diagnosed with acoustic neuroma. He suffered complications during an operation to remove the tumour, which led to a stroke, leaving him half-paralysed and using a wheelchair. With her brothers at college, Bonham Carter was left to help her mother cope. Bonham Carter later studied her father's movements and mannerisms for her role in The Theory of Flight. He died in January 2004.

== Career ==
=== Early work and breakthrough (1980s–1990s) ===
Bonham Carter, who has had no formal acting training, entered the field winning a national writing contest in 1979 and used the money to pay for her entry into the actors' Spotlight directory. Bonham Carter made her professional acting debut at age 16 in a television commercial. She also had a minor part in the 1983 TV film A Pattern of Roses. In the early 1990s, Bonham Carter studied clowning under master clown Philippe Gaulier at École Philippe Gaulier.

Bonham Carter's first lead film role was as Lady Jane Grey in Lady Jane (1986), which was given mixed reviews by critics. Her breakthrough role was as Lucy Honeychurch in A Room with a View (1985), an adaptation of E. M. Forster's 1908 novel, which was filmed after Lady Jane, but released two months earlier. Bonham Carter also appeared in episodes of Miami Vice as Don Johnson's love interest during the 1986–87 season, and then in 1987 with Dirk Bogarde in The Vision, Stewart Granger in A Hazard of Hearts, and John Gielgud in Getting It Right. Bonham Carter was originally cast for the role of Bess McNeill in Breaking the Waves, but backed out during production owing to "the character's painful psychic and physical exposure", according to Roger Ebert. The role went to Emily Watson, who was nominated for an Academy Award for her performance.

Bonham Carter's early films led to her being typecast as a "corset queen" and "English rose", playing pre- and early 20th century characters, particularly in Merchant Ivory films. Uncomfortable with this image, Bonham Carter states: "I looked, as someone said, like a bloated chipmunk". In 1994, she appeared in a dream sequence during the second series of the British sitcom Absolutely Fabulous, as Edina Monsoon's daughter Saffron, who was normally played by Julia Sawalha. Throughout the series, references were made to Saffron's resemblance to Bonham Carter.

Bonham Carter, who speaks French fluently, starred in a 1996 French film titled Portraits chinois. That same year, she played Olivia in Trevor Nunn's film version of Twelfth Night. A high point of Bonham Carter's early career, according to Alexander Ramos of Cinemablend, was her performance as the scheming Kate Croy in the 1997 film adaption of The Wings of the Dove, which was highly acclaimed internationally, and saw her receive her first Golden Globe, and Academy Award nominations for Best Lead Actress. Fight Club followed in 1999, where Bonham Carter played Marla Singer, a role for which she won the 2000 Empire Award for Best British Actress.

=== Worldwide recognition (2000s–present) ===
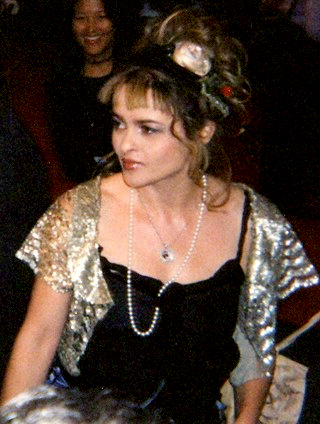
Bonham Carter at the 2005 Toronto International Film Festival

Bonham Carter landed her second role as Queen of England in 2003 when she was cast to play Anne Boleyn in the two part mini-series Henry VIII. In 2005, Bonham Carter voiced Lady Tottingham, a wealthy aristocratic spinster in the 2005 stop-motion animated comedy Wallace & Gromit: The Curse of the Were-Rabbit. Starring alongside Ralph Fiennes and Peter Sallis, the film serves as part of the Wallace & Gromit series.

Bonham Carter was a member of the 2006 Cannes Film Festival jury that unanimously selected The Wind That Shakes the Barley as best film. In May 2006, she launched her own fashion line, "The Pantaloonies", with swimwear designer Samantha Sage. Their first collection, called Bloomin' Bloomers, is a Victorian style selection of camisoles, mob caps, and bloomers. The duo worked on Pantaloonies customised jeans, which Bonham Carter describes as "a kind of scrapbook on the bum".

Bonham Carter played the evil witch Bellatrix Lestrange in the final four Harry Potter films (2007–2011). While filming Harry Potter and the Order of the Phoenix, she accidentally perforated the eardrum of Matthew Lewis (playing Neville Longbottom) when she stuck her wand into his ear canal. Bonham Carter received positive reviews as Bellatrix, described as a "shining but underused talent". She played Mrs. Lovett, Sweeney Todd's (Johnny Depp) amorous accomplice, in the film adaptation of Stephen Sondheim's Broadway musical, Sweeney Todd: The Demon Barber of Fleet Street, directed by Burton. Bonham Carter received a nomination for the Golden Globe Award for Best Actress in a Motion Picture – Musical or Comedy for her performance. Bonham Carter won the Best Actress award in the 2007 Evening Standard British Film Awards for her performances in Sweeney Todd and Conversations With Other Women, along with another Best Actress award at the 2009 Empire Awards. Bonham Carter also appeared in the fourth Terminator film, entitled Terminator Salvation as Serena Kogan, playing a small but pivotal role as a personification of Skynet.

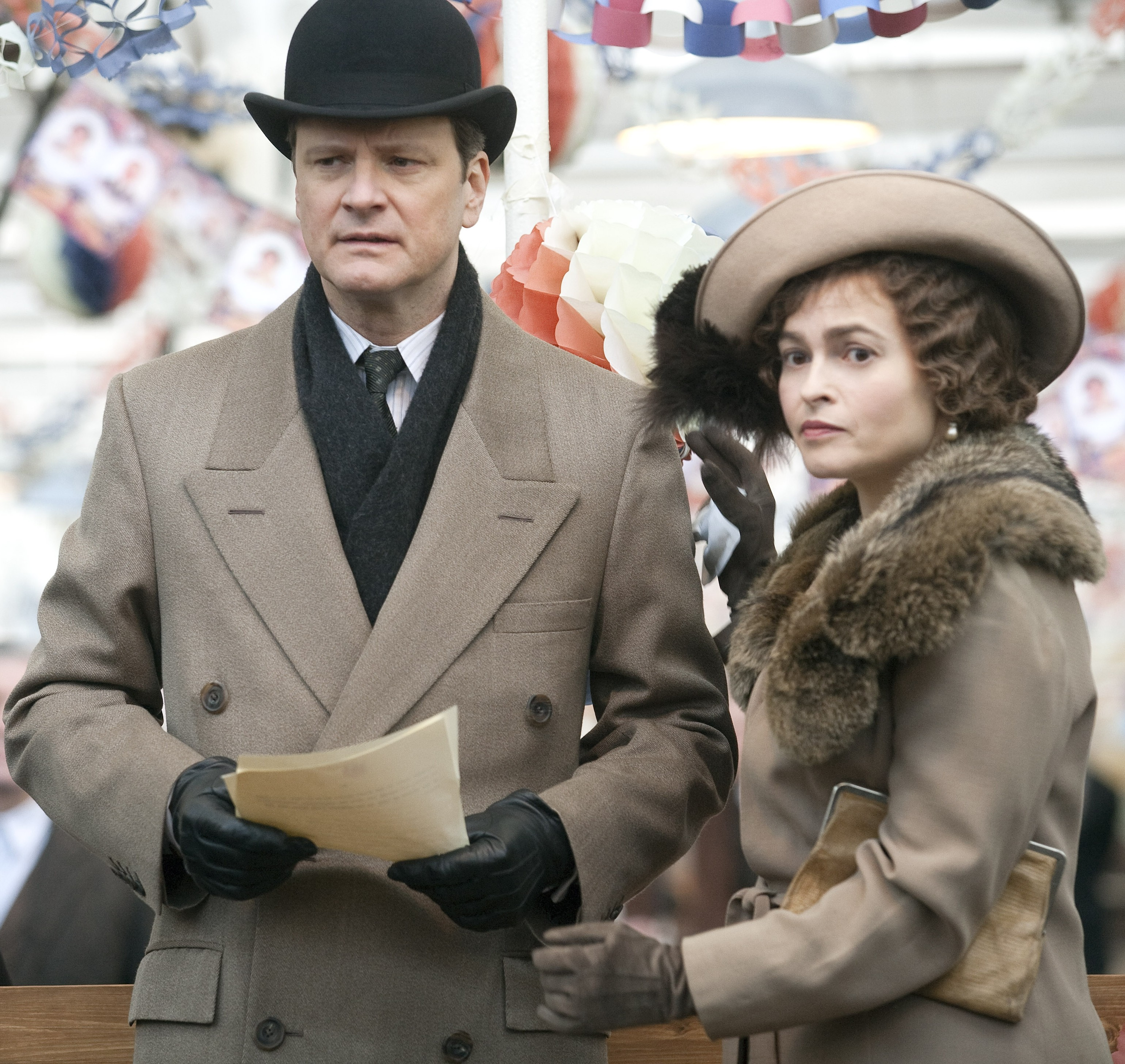
Bonham Carter with Colin Firth on the set of The King's Speech in 2009

In 2009, Bonham Carter was the mother squirrel narrator in the 30-minute animated film adaptation of the best-selling children's book The Gruffalo, which was broadcast on BBC One on 25 December 2009. Bonham Carter joined the cast of Tim Burton's 2010 film, Alice in Wonderland, as the Red Queen. She appears alongside Johnny Depp, Anne Hathaway, Mia Wasikowska, Crispin Glover, and Harry Potter co-star Alan Rickman. Her role was an amalgamation of the Queen of Hearts and the Red Queen. In early 2009, Bonham Carter was named one of The Times's top-10 British Actresses of all time, along with fellow actresses Judi Dench, Helen Mirren, Maggie Smith, Julie Andrews, and Audrey Hepburn.

In 2010, Bonham Carter played Queen Elizabeth in the film The King's Speech. As of January 2011, she had received numerous plaudits and praise for her performance, including nominations for the BAFTA Award for Best Actress in a Supporting Role and the Academy Award for Best Supporting Actress. Bonham Carter won her first BAFTA Award, but lost the Academy Award to Melissa Leo for The Fighter.

Bonham Carter signed to play author Enid Blyton in the BBC Four television biopic, Enid. It was the first depiction of Blyton's life on the screen; she starred with Matthew Macfadyen and Denis Lawson. Bonham Carter received her first nomination for the British Academy Television Award for Best Actress, for Enid. In 2010, she starred with Freddie Highmore in the Nigel Slater biopic Toast, which was filmed in the West Midlands and received a gala at the 2011 Berlin International Film Festival. Bonham Carter received the Britannia Award for British Artist of the Year from BAFTA LA in 2011.

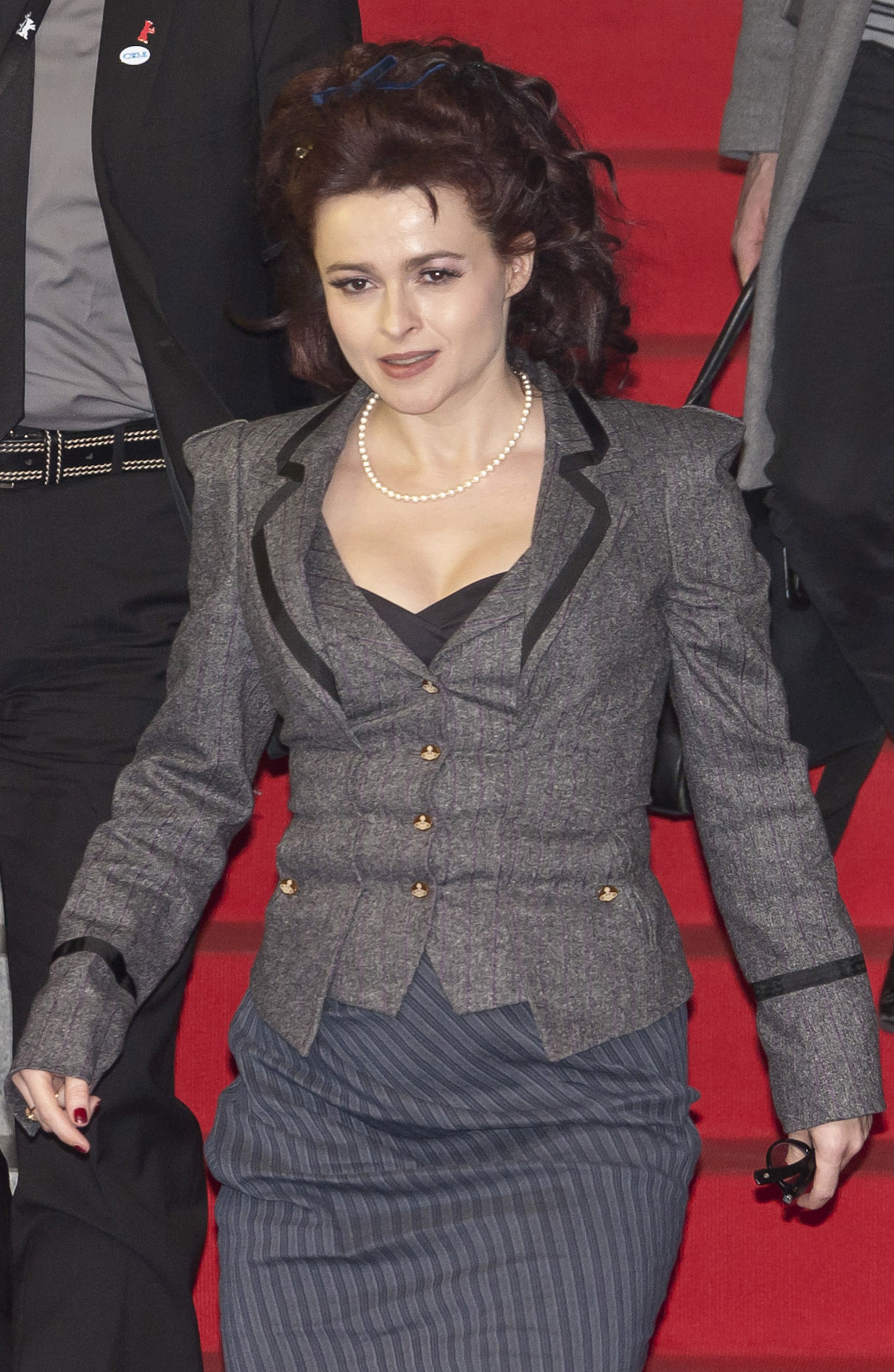
Bonham Carter at the 2011 Berlin International Film Festival

In 2012, Bonham Carter appeared as the eccentric, jilted bride Miss Havisham—one of the most potent figures in Victorian gothic fiction—in Mike Newell's adaptation of the Charles Dickens novel Great Expectations. In April 2012, she appeared in Rufus Wainwright's music video for his single "Out of the Game", featured on the album of the same name. Bonham Carter co-starred in a film adaptation of the musical Les Misérables, which was released in 2012. She played the role of Madame Thénardier.

Bonham Carter also appeared in a short film directed by Roman Polanski for the clothing brand Prada. The short was entitled A Therapy and she appeared as a patient of Ben Kingsley's therapist.

In 2013, Bonham Carter appeared in The Young and Prodigious T.S. Spivet, an adaptation of Reif Larsen's book The Selected Works of T.S. Spivet. That same year, she played Red Harrington, a peg-legged brothel madam, who assists Reid and Tonto in locating Cavendish, in the movie The Lone Ranger, while also narrating poetry for The Love Book App, an interactive anthology of love literature developed by Allie Byrne Esiri. Bonham Carter also appeared as Elizabeth Taylor, alongside Dominic West as Richard Burton, in BBC4's Burton & Taylor, which premiered at the 2013 Hamptons International Film Festival. She played the Fairy Godmother in the 2015 live-action re-imagining of Walt Disney's Cinderella.

In 2016, Bonham Carter reprised her role of the Red Queen in Alice Through the Looking Glass. In June 2018, she starred in a spin-off of the Ocean's Eleven trilogy, titled Ocean's 8, alongside Sandra Bullock, Cate Blanchett, Anne Hathaway, and Sarah Paulson. Bonham Carter plays an older Princess Margaret—whom Bonham Carter knew in person through her uncle Mark—for the Netflix series The Crown, replacing Vanessa Kirby, who played a younger version for the first two seasons. Bonham Carter's performance earned her nominations for the Primetime Emmy Award for Outstanding Supporting Actress in a Drama Series, the Golden Globe Award for Best Supporting Actress – Series, Miniseries or Television Film, the British Academy Television Award for Best Supporting Actress, the Critics' Choice Television Award for Best Supporting Actress in a Drama Series and the Actor Award for Outstanding Performance by a Female Actor in a Drama Series. She was also a part of the ensemble cast that won the Actor Award for Outstanding Performance by an Ensemble in a Drama Series in 2019 and 2020. In 2020, Bonham Carter starred as Eudoria Holmes in the Netflix film Enola Holmes, which is based on the Sherlock Holmes adaptation, The Enola Holmes Mysteries. She played Margaret Gore in the 2024 film Four Letters of Love.

== Personal life ==
In August 2008, four of Bonham Carter's relatives were killed in a safari bus crash in South Africa, and she was given indefinite leave from filming Terminator Salvation, returning later to complete filming.

In early October 2008, Bonham Carter became the first patron of the charity Action Duchenne, the national charity established to support parents and sufferers of Duchenne muscular dystrophy.

In August 2014, Bonham Carter was one of 200 public figures who were signatories to a letter to The Guardian opposing Scottish independence in the run-up to September's referendum on that issue.

In 2016, Bonham Carter said she was keen on the UK remaining in the European Union in regard to the referendum on that issue.

In 2022, Bonham Carter was appointed to the honorary position of the London Library's president, making her their first female president. Bonham Carter has been a member of the London Library since 1986.

=== Relationships ===
In 1994, Bonham Carter and Kenneth Branagh met while filming Mary Shelley's Frankenstein. Branagh is believed to have begun an affair with Bonham Carter "on the Frankenstein set in 1994", while still married to Emma Thompson. In 1999, after five years together, Bonham Carter and Branagh separated.

Thompson has said that she has "no hard feelings" towards Bonham Carter, calling the affair "blood under the bridge". Thompson stated: "You can't hold on to anything like that. It's pointless. I haven't got the energy for it. Helena and I made our peace years and years ago. She's a wonderful woman." Thompson, Branagh, and Bonham Carter all later went on to appear in the Harry Potter series (none of them shared any scenes); Thompson and Bonham Carter both appeared in Order of the Phoenix.

In 2001, Bonham Carter began a relationship with American director Tim Burton, engaged to actress Lisa Marie when Carter and Burton met while filming Planet of the Apes; they remained together for more than a decade. Burton and Bonham Carter had worked together on six films as of 2016—Burton having cast Bonham Carter in Big Fish, Corpse Bride, Charlie and the Chocolate Factory, Sweeney Todd: The Demon Barber of Fleet Street, Alice in Wonderland, and Dark Shadows. After their separation, Bonham Carter said, "It might be easier to work together without being together anymore. He always only cast me with great embarrassment."

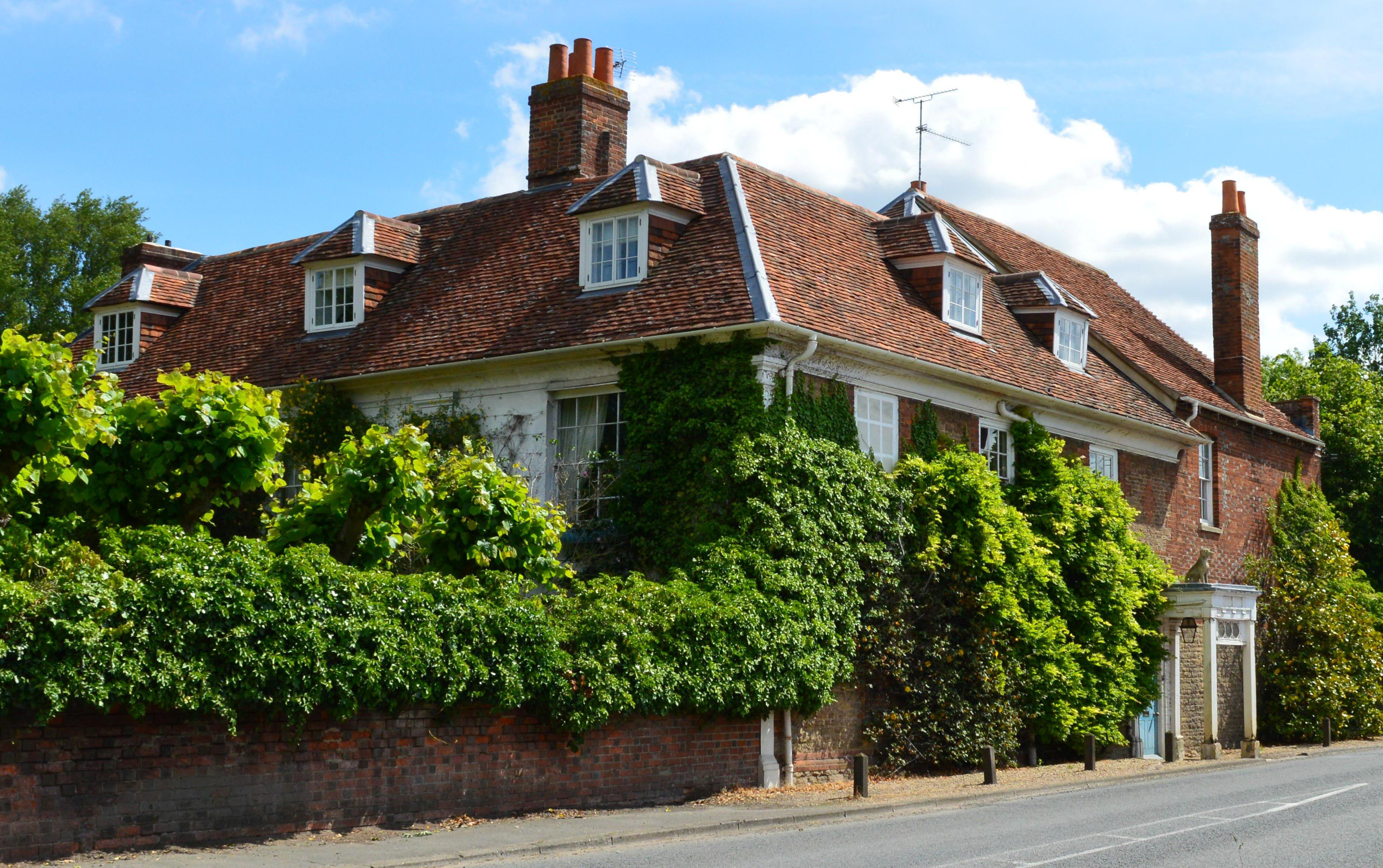
Mill House in Oxfordshire, bought by Bonham Carter in 2006

Bonham Carter and Burton lived in adjoining houses in Belsize Park, London. She owned one of the houses; Burton later bought the other, and they connected the two. In 2006, they bought the Mill House in Sutton Courtenay, Oxfordshire. It was previously leased by her grandmother, Violet Bonham Carter, and owned by her great-grandfather H. H. Asquith.

Bonham Carter and Burton have a son and daughter together. She told The Daily Telegraph of her struggles with infertility and the difficulties she had during her pregnancies. She said that before the conception of her daughter, she and Burton had been trying for a baby for two years and, although they conceived naturally, they were considering in vitro fertilisation. On 23 December 2014, the two announced that they had "separated amicably" earlier that year. Of the separation, Bonham Carter told Harper's Bazaar: "Everyone always says you have to be strong and have a stiff upper lip, but it's okay to be fragile... You've got to take very small steps, and sometimes you won't know where to go next because you've lost yourself." She added: "With divorce, you go through massive grief — it is a death of a relationship, so it's utterly bewildering. Your identity, everything, changes."

Since 2018, Bonham Carter has been in a relationship with art historian Rye Dag Holmboe, who is 21 years her junior. Regarding their age gap, Bonham Carter told The Times in 2019: "Everybody ages at a different rate. My boyfriend is unbelievably mature. He's an old soul in a young body, what more could I want? People are slightly frightened of older women, but he isn't. Women can be very powerful when they're older."

=== Ancestry ===
==== Paternal ====
Bonham Carter's paternal grandparents were British Liberal politicians Sir Maurice Bonham Carter and Lady Violet Bonham Carter. Sir Maurice was descended from John Bonham Carter, Member of Parliament for Portsmouth. Violet was a daughter of H. H. Asquith, 1st Earl of Oxford and Asquith, and Prime Minister of Britain 1908–1916. Violet's brother was Anthony Asquith, an English director of films such as Carrington V.C. and The Importance of Being Earnest. Helena is also a first cousin of the economist Adam Ridley and of politician Jane Bonham Carter.

Bonham Carter is a distant cousin of actor Crispin Bonham Carter. Other distant relatives include Lothian Bonham Carter, who played first-class cricket for Hampshire, his son, Vice Admiral Sir Stuart Bonham Carter, who served in the Royal Navy in both world wars, and English nurse Florence Nightingale.

==== Maternal ====
Bonham Carter's maternal grandfather, Spanish diplomat Eduardo Propper de Callejón, saved thousands of Jews from the Holocaust during the Second World War, for which he was recognised as Righteous Among the Nations, and posthumously received the Courage to Care Award from the Anti-Defamation League. His own father was a Bohemian Jew, and his wife, Helena's grandmother, was a Jewish convert to Catholicism. He later served as Minister-Counselor at the Spanish Embassy in Washington, D.C.

Bonham Carter's maternal grandmother, Baroness Hélène Fould-Springer, was from an upper-class Jewish family; she was the daughter of Baron Eugène Fould-Springer (a French banker descended from the Ephrussi family and the Fould dynasty) and Marie-Cécile von Springer (whose father was Austrian-born industrialist Baron Gustav von Springer, and whose mother was from the de Koenigswarter family). Hélène Fould-Springer converted to Catholicism after the Second World War. Hélène's sister was the French philanthropist Liliane de Rothschild (1916–2003), the wife of Baron Élie de Rothschild, of the Rothschild family, who had also married into the von Springer family in the 19th century) Liliane's other sister, Therese Fould-Springer, was the mother of British writer David Pryce-Jones.

== Public image ==
Bonham Carter is known for her unconventional and eccentric sense of fashion. British Vogue described Bonham Carter's dark style in clothing and acting as "quirky and irreverent". Vanity Fair named her on its 2010 Best-Dressed List, and Bonham Carter was selected by Marc Jacobs to be the face of his Autumn/Winter 2011 advertising campaign. She has cited Vivienne Westwood and Marie Antoinette as her main style influences.

In May 2021, Bonham Carter featured in a commercial for British furniture retailer Sofology, taking viewers through the quirks and stylistic flourishes of her home. In 2021, she wrote an article for Harper's Bazaar on the influence of Lewis Carroll's Alice's Adventures in Wonderland on her life since she first read the book as a child: "As far back as I can remember, I've been a wannabe Alice", adding, "everywhere I look at home, every view has some reference to Alice.

== See also ==
- List of British actors
- List of Academy Award winners and nominees from Great Britain
- List of Jewish Academy Award winners and nominees
- List of actors with Academy Award nominations
- List of actors with more than one Academy Award nomination in the acting categories
- List of International Emmy Award winners
