= Cressida Ridley =

British archaeologist (1916–1998)

- Born: Helen Laura Cressida Bonham Carter; April 22, 1916
- Died: June 10, 1998 (aged 82)
- Occupation: Archaeologist
- Spouse: Jasper Ridley (m. 1939)
- Children: Adam Ridley
- Parents: Maurice Bonham-Carter (father); Violet Bonham Carter (mother)

Helen Laura Cressida Ridley née Bonham Carter (22 April 1916 – 10 June 1998) was an archaeologist in the field of Greek Neolithic Pottery.

== Early life ==
Helen Laura Cressida Bonham Carter was born in 1916, the first of Sir Maurice and Lady Violet Bonham Carter's four children. Her grandfather, H. H. Asquith, was the Prime Minister at the time. She frequently visited Austria and Eastern Europe between the ages of 15 and 19 to broaden her education but her family prevented her taking a place at London University. In June 1939 she married Jasper Ridley, he was the son of the Hon. Sir Jasper Nicholas Ridley. Jasper Ridley was killed in 1943 after an escape from a prisoner-of-war camp in Italy. They had one son, Adam Ridley.

== Archaeological work ==
She participated in fieldwork in Wiltshire with a local archaeological group before enrolling for the Postgraduate Diploma in Archaeology at the Institute of Archaeology in London in 1961. After this she won a scholarship to the British School in Athens. She also took part in the excavations on the Greek island of Saliagos, which were directed by John Evans and Colin Renfrew. She became fluent in Modern Greek and translated books on archaeology into English. She also became an expert on Greek Neolithic pottery. For the next thirty years she took part in excavations in Greece and Türkiye each summer.

In 1971, she co-directed a rescue excavation of a Neolithic site in Servia, Greece that was to be destroyed by the construction of a dam, along with Dr. Katerina Romiopoulou of the Greek Archaeological Service. The excavation continued for three summer seasons. Only the first volume of the exaction report was published by the time of her death.

== Publications ==
- Ridley, Cressida; Wardle, K A (1979). Rescue excavations at Servia 1971-73 : a preliminary report. British school at Athens.
- Ridley, Cressida; Wardle, K A; Mould, Catharine A (2000). Servia 1: Anglo-Hellenic rescue excavations 1971-73. Supplementary volumes. London: British school at Athens. ISBN 978-0-904887-33-4.
