= Violet Bonham Carter =

British politician (1887–1969)

The Right Honourable The Baroness Asquith of Yarnbury DBE
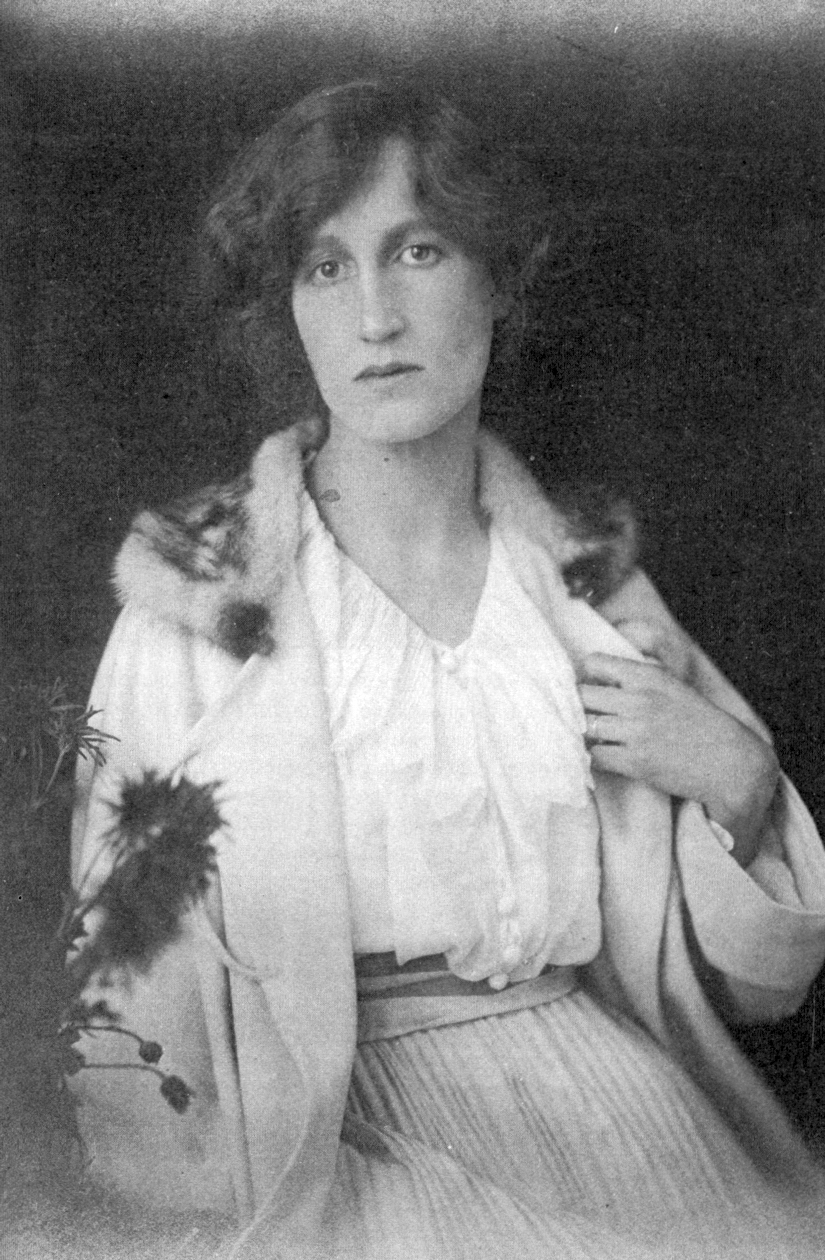
- Carter in 1915

President of the Liberal Party
- In office 1945–1947
- Preceded by: James Meston
- Succeeded by: Isaac Foot

President of the Women's Liberal Federation
- In office 1923–1925
- Preceded by: Viscountess Cowdray
- Succeeded by: Margaret Wintringham

Member of the House of Lords Lord Temporal
- In office 21 December 1964 – 19 February 1969; Life Peerage

Personal details
- Born: Helen Violet Asquith; 15 April 1887 Hampstead, London, England
- Died: 19 February 1969 (aged 81) London, England
- Resting place: St Andrew's Church, Mells
- Party: Liberal
- Spouse: Sir Maurice Bonham Carter (m. 1915; died 1960)
- Children: Hon. Helen Bonham Carter; Mark Bonham Carter, Baron Bonham Carter of Yarnbury; Hon. Raymond Bonham Carter; Laura, Baroness Grimond of Firth
- Parents: H. H. Asquith; Helen Kelsall Melland
- Relatives: Helena Bonham Carter (granddaughter); Adam Ridley (grandson); Jane Bonham Carter, Baroness Bonham-Carter of Yarnbury (granddaughter)

Helen Violet Bonham Carter, Baroness Asquith of Yarnbury, DBE (15 April 1887 – 19 February 1969), known until her marriage as Violet Asquith, was a British politician and diarist. She was the daughter of H. H. Asquith, Prime Minister from 1908 to 1916, and she was known as Lady Violet, a courtesy title, after her father's elevation to the peerage as Earl of Oxford and Asquith in 1925. Later she became active in Liberal politics herself, and was a leading opponent of appeasement. She stood for Parliament and became a life peer.

She was also involved in arts and literature. Her diaries cover her father's premiership before and during the First World War and continue until the 1960s. She was Sir Winston Churchill's closest female friend, apart from his wife. Her grandchildren include the actress Helena Bonham Carter.

== Early life ==
Helen Violet Asquith was born in Hampstead, London, England, and grew up with politics. She lived in 10 Downing Street from 1908, when her father occupied it. She was educated at home by governesses, and later sent to Paris to improve her languages. In 1903 she attended a finishing school in Dresden.

Her mother, Helen Kelsall Melland, died of typhoid fever when Violet was four years old. Her stepmother from 1894 was Margot Tennant: their relationship has been described as "stormy". Her four brothers were Raymond, Herbert, Arthur, and Cyril. Violet's best friend when she was young was Venetia Stanley, who later had an intense emotional relationship with her father.

== Edwardian social life ==
Presented at court in 1905, Violet Asquith entered the social world of parties in her first London season. Sir Charles Tennant, 1st Baronet, Margot's father, hosted with his wife Marguerite a dance in Grosvenor Square for Violet and his granddaughter Frances Tennant, who married in 1912 Guy Lawrence Charteris and was mother of Ann Fleming. Guy's sister Cynthia was one of Violet's close friends, and married her brother Herbert in 1910.

In October 1907 Violet had a proposal of marriage from Arnold Ward, a college friend of her brother Raymond. She turned it down. Sutherland suggests her parents were against the match: financial matters were probably a factor, and the Wards were Tories.

Raymond Asquith belonged to The Coterie. By 1908 this group of the younger generation was being noticed in social gossip, and a press story included Violet:

Mrs. Raymond Asquith [...] was the leading spirit of the coterie of "Young Souls" which comprised as its members Lady Marjorie and Lady Violet Manners, Miss Cicely Horner, Miss Violet Asquith, and Miss Viola Tree.

Violet was close to Winston Churchill, promoted to the Liberal Cabinet in 1908: Churchill said later they were "practically engaged", and they were friends for life. He actually became engaged that year to Clementine Hozier, whom Violet thought "as stupid as an owl". In late August, between his engagement and his marriage, Churchill spent a holiday with the Asquith family at New Slains Castle on the Scottish coast. Some days after his departure, but while Arnold Ward remained a guest, Violet went out one evening, to look for a book left on the rocks. She was discovered after a search of several hours, lying uninjured but unconscious near the coastal path. Michael Shelden suggests Violet's experience may have been "an unhappy young woman's cry for attention".

Violet became engaged to Archibald Gordon (Archie), son of John Hamilton-Gordon, 1st Marquess of Aberdeen and Temair and his wife Ishbel in 1909, after he had had a car accident and was on what became his deathbed.

== 1910–1914 ==
Violet travelled to the Sudan, where her brother Arthur was in the civil service. On her return to the United Kingdom, she found that her good friend Olive MacLeod, sister of Flora MacLeod, had lost her fiancé Boyd Alexander, killed in Africa. Under Violet's influence, Olive played the part of a widow. She then travelled to visit Alexander's grave.

In May 1912 Violet accompanied her father and step-mother on a Mediterranean cruise, aboard HMS Enchantress, with a party comprising mainly Churchill, members of his family, and his political entourage including Edward Marsh, but also Louis of Battenberg. That year she acquired a long-term correspondent, Matthew Nathan. In March 1913 she met Rupert Brooke, at a dinner given by Marsh to celebrate Brooke's Fellowship at King's College, Cambridge, with W. B. Yeats, Clementine Churchill and Cynthia Asquith. She was the chosen confidante of Marsh after Brooke's death in 1915.

Violet made an effort to befriend Ottoline Morrell, in 1913. Her house in Bedford Square offered conversation with Henry James, Wyndham Lewis and Desmond MacCarthy. Morrell found her conversation dazzling rather than profound.

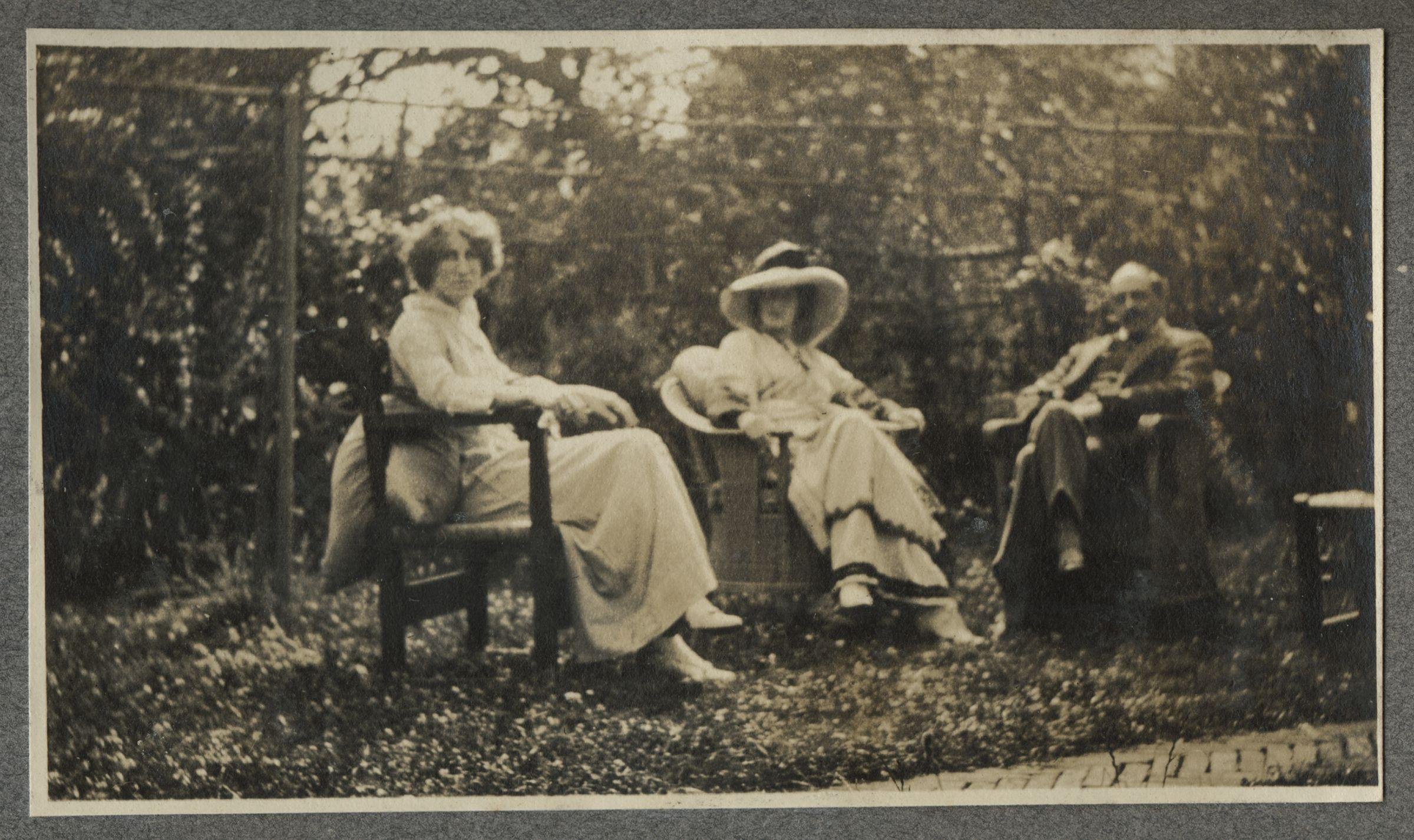
Violet Bonham Carter, Lady Ottoline Morrell, and an unidentified man

== World War I ==
On 16 January 1915, the ageing Henry James visited the Asquiths at Walmer Castle in Kent. Violet Asquith and her half-sister Elizabeth saw James's lapidary but orotund and halting conversation being treated without respect by Winston Churchill, who had not read his books. James referred, on leaving, to the "very encouraging experience to meet that young man". In February she saw off Rupert Brooke, who had become a friend and correspondent, sailing with his division bound for the Gallipoli campaign and death. Violet wrote in 1915 to Aubrey Herbert that Brooke's death was one of the greatest sorrows of her life; and according to Virginia Woolf, in 1916 she said that she had loved Brooke "as she had never loved any man". On 30 November 1915 Violet married Maurice Bonham-Carter, her father's principal private secretary.

Jackie Fisher the First Sea Lord, at odds with Churchill, the First Lord of the Admiralty, over the Gallipoli campaign, resigned on 15 May 1915. It set off a train of political events that led to the end of the Liberal Cabinet in favour of a coalition, the removal of Churchill, and then in 1916 Asquith's replacement as prime minister by Lloyd George. Bonham Carter influenced the later historiography of these events, clashing in particular with Robert Blake who adhered more to Lord Beaverbrook's account. Through her, Asquith's biographer Roy Jenkins was given access to family papers.

== Engagement in politics, interwar period ==
The Liberal Party split between followers of Asquith and of Lloyd George. As it fell on hard times in the 1920s, Bonham Carter campaigned for her father at the 1920 Paisley by-election. That election was won, and she was asked to become a Liberal candidate herself. Lord Kilbracken was in favour, but she decided to give her children priority. She was active as President of the Women's Liberal Federation (1923–25, 1939–45) and was the first woman to serve as President of the Liberal Party (1945–47). She campaigned with Eleanor Rathbone for family allowances.

Bonham Carter spoke on many platforms in the 1920s and 1930s, and along with Winston Churchill (and others), she early saw the dangers of European fascism. She joined and animated a number of anti-fascist groups (such as The Focus Group), often in concert with Churchill, and spoke at their gatherings. In a 1938 speech she mocked Neville Chamberlain's dealings with Nazi Germany as the policy of "peace at any price that others can be forced to pay". After the Protectorate of Bohemia and Moravia was created from Czechoslovakia on 15 March 1939, she supported Czechoslovak refugees and those persecuted by the Nazis.

== Later life ==
In the 1945 general election Bonham Carter stood for Wells, coming third, while in 1951 she stood for the winnable seat of Colne Valley. As an old friend, Churchill arranged for the Conservatives to refrain from nominating a candidate for the constituency, giving her a clear run against Labour. She was nonetheless narrowly defeated. In the 1953 Coronation Honours she was appointed a Dame Commander of the Order of the British Empire (DBE). She continued to be a popular and charismatic speaker for Liberal candidates, including her son-in-law Jo Grimond, her son Mark, and Jeremy Thorpe, and she was a frequent broadcaster on current affairs programmes on radio and television.

In the postwar years, Bonham Carter was an active supporter of the United Nations and the cause of European unity, advocating for Britain's entry into the Common Market. In the non-political sphere, she was also active in the arts, including serving as a governor of the BBC from 1941 to 1946, and a governor of the Old Vic (1945–69).

On 21 December 1964, Violet Bonham Carter was created a life peer as Baroness Asquith of Yarnbury, of Yarnbury in the County of Wilts, one of the first new Liberal peers in several decades. She became active in the House of Lords.

== Death ==
Lady Violet Bonham Carter died in 1969 of a heart attack, aged 81, and was interred at St Andrew's Church, Mells, Somerset, near the home of her late brother, Raymond.

== Writings ==
Violet Bonham Carter was a diarist and biographer. Her works include:

- "Winston Churchill As I Know Him" by Violet Bonham Carter, in Winston Spencer Churchill: Servant of Crown and Commonwealth, ed. Sir James Marchant, London: Cassell, 1954.
- Winston Churchill as I Knew Him, Violet Bonham Carter (Eyre and Spottiswoode, 1965), published in the US as Winston Churchill: An Intimate Portrait. This book was begun in 1955, and its publication ten years later was the publisher's decision, awaiting Churchill's death.
- Lantern Slides: The Diaries and Letters of Violet Bonham Carter, 1904–1914, eds. Mark Bonham Carter and Mark Pottle (Weidenfeld & Nicolson, 1996)
- Champion Redoubtable: The Diaries and Letters of Violet Bonham Carter, 1914–1945, ed. Mark Pottle (Weidenfeld & Nicolson, 1998)
- Daring to Hope: The Diaries and Letters of Violet Bonham Carter, 1945–1969, ed. Mark Pottle (Weidenfeld & Nicolson, 2000)

Winston Churchill As I Knew Him (1965) recounted how during the course of conversation at the dinner party at which they first met, Churchill concluded a thought with words to the effect that "Of course, we are all worms, but I do believe that I am a glow worm".

== Family ==
Violet Asquith married her father's Principal Private Secretary, Maurice Bonham Carter, in 1915. They had four children together:

- Helen Laura Cressida Bonham Carter, Mrs Jasper Ridley, mother of the economist Sir Adam Ridley.
- Laura Miranda Bonham Carter, Lady Grimond, wife of the Liberal Party leader Jo Grimond.
- Mark Bonham Carter, Baron Bonham-Carter, a Liberal Member of Parliament before going to the House of Lords, and father of Jane Bonham Carter, Baroness Bonham-Carter of Yarnbury.
- Raymond Bonham Carter, father of the actress Helena Bonham Carter.

Their long-term London address was 21 Hyde Park Square.

Party political offices
Preceded by James Meston	President of the Liberal Party; 1945–1947	Succeeded by Isaac Foot
Preceded by Viscountess Cowdray	President of the Women's Liberal Federation; 1923–1925	Succeeded by Margaret Wintringham
