= Asquith (surname) =

Asquith is a surname, and may refer to:

- Anne Asquith (1916–1998), British code breaker, wife of Julian Asquith, 2nd Earl of Oxford and Asquith
- Anthony Asquith (1902–1968), film director, youngest son of H. H. Asquith
- Arthur Asquith (1883–1939), brigadier-general, third son of H. H. Asquith
- Beaumont Asquith (1910–1977), English footballer
- Clare Asquith, Countess of Oxford and Asquith (born 1951), independent scholar and author, wife of the 3rd Earl
- Lady Cynthia Asquith (1887–1960), author, wife of Herbert Asquith the poet
- Cyril Asquith, Baron Asquith of Bishopstone (1890–1954), barrister, judge and law lord, fourth son of H. H. Asquith
- Sir Dominic Asquith (born 1957), diplomat, ambassador to Iraq, Egypt and Libya, younger son of the 2nd Earl
- Emily Asquith (born 2003), boxer
- Frederick Asquith (1870–1916), English cricketer
- H. H. Asquith (1852–1928), British Prime Minister, 1st Earl of Oxford and Asquith
- Herbert Asquith (poet) (1881–1947), poet, second son of H. H. Asquith
- John Asquith (1932–2009), English cricketer
- Julian Asquith, 2nd Earl of Oxford and Asquith (1916–2011), English peer and colonial administrator
- Katharine Asquith (1885–1976), English landowner and patron of the arts, wife of Raymond Asquith
- Lincoln Asquith (born 1964), English athlete
- Margot Asquith (1864–1945), author and second wife of H. H. Asquith
- Paul Asquith (born 1993), Australian rugby union footballer
- Raymond Asquith (1878–1916), eldest son of H. H. Asquith
- Raymond Asquith, 3rd Earl of Oxford and Asquith (born 1952), diplomat, elder son of the 2nd Earl
- Ros Asquith, British cartoonist, children's author, illustrator and journalist
- Simon Asquith (born 1972), British Royal Navy officer
- William Asquith, English rugby league player

== See also ==
- Askwith (surname)
