= Asquith (disambiguation) =

H. H. Asquith (1852–1928) was Prime Minister of the United Kingdom from 1908 to 1916.

Asquith may also refer to:

- Earl of Oxford and Asquith, a peerage title given to H. H. Asquith

== People ==
- Asquith (surname)
- Persons of the Asquith family, descended from or related to Prime Minister Asquith:
  - Elizabeth Bibesco (1897–1945), writer, daughter of H. H. Asquith and Margot Asquith
  - Violet Bonham Carter (1887–1969), politician and diarist, elder daughter of H. H. Asquith by his first wife

== Place names ==
- Askwith, North Yorkshire, England, formerly spelled Asquith
- Asquith, New South Wales, suburb of Sydney, Australia
- Asquith Boys High School in Asquith, Sydney, Australia
- Asquith Girls High School in Asquith, Sydney, Australia
- Asquith, Saskatchewan, Canada
- Asquith Bluff, Antarctica

== Automobiles ==
- Asquith (1901 automobile)
- Asquith (1981 automobile)
