= Lord Asquith =

Lord Asquith may refer to:

- H. H. Asquith, 1st Earl of Oxford and Asquith (1852–1928)
- Cyril Asquith, Baron Asquith of Bishopstone (1890–1954)
- Julian Asquith, 2nd Earl of Oxford and Asquith (1916–2011)
- Raymond Asquith, 3rd Earl of Oxford and Asquith (born 1952)
