= Redrice School =

Former school in Hampshire, England

Coordinates: 51.174°N 1.51572°W

Information
- Type: Public day and boarding
- Motto: Alta Patens (Aiming High)
- Religious affiliation: Roman Catholic
- Established: 1961
- Closed: 1982
- Local authority: Hampshire
- Gender: Coeducational

Redrice school
- Location within Hampshire
- OS grid reference: SU3379942084
- District: Test Valley
- Shire county: Hampshire
- Region: South East
- Country: England
- Sovereign state: United Kingdom
- Post town: Andover
- Postcode district: SP11
- Police: Hampshire and Isle of Wight
- Fire: Hampshire and Isle of Wight
- Ambulance: South Central
- UK Parliament: North West Hampshire

Redrice School was an independent school located at Red Rice, near Andover in Hampshire, United Kingdom.

== History ==
The school was founded by Adrian Stokes and Richard Arnold Jones in 1961 with patronage of The Bishop of Portsmouth. and with a Board of Governors chaired by Thomas Shaw, 3rd Baron Craigmyle. A later chairman was William O'Brien.

The school was dedicated to the 40 English Martyrs, whose names were given to the houses and dormitories. The school crest depicted the martyr's crown and palm leaves.

After the Second World War, there was an increased demand for Catholic education. In the private sector, the Catholic preparatory and public schools were often oversubscribed. When Redrice opened in 1961 it was the first entirely lay-run Catholic public school.

Originally, there was a planned limit of 200 boarders. A pupil could start after passing the Common Entrance examination, and end after taking 'A' levels. That five-year period, and through the use of streaming, gave an average class size of fewer than 15 pupils.

In 1969, the school began to admit girls.

The name changed in 1980 from 'Redrice School' to 'Redrice College' to assist in marketing the school abroad. The school closed in 1982, and the premises were taken over by Farleigh School.

The school's former pupils are named 'old martyrs'. Annual reunion dinners take place in London. In February 2013, there were over 140 ex-pupils connected in a Facebook group for ex-pupils and staff.

This Roman Catholic boarding school had the motto Alta Patens (English: 'Aiming High').

== Building and grounds ==
Some trees were removed to create space for rugby and cricket fields. New buildings were built onto the existing building to accommodate classrooms and dormitories. Some attempts were made to convert an ornamental water garden into a swimming pool. A new house was built in the grounds as accommodation for one of the headmasters (Adrian Stokes) and his family.

== Notable alumni ==
- Bevil Kinross
- Stefano Massimo
- Patrick Nicholls
- Chris Oti
- Yinka Shonibare

== Notable staff ==
- Thomas Andrew Bull
- Alexander Ian McNaughton Davie
- Joseph O'Shea, poet
- John Eely Partridge
