= Asquith Brothers =

British automobile manufacturer

Asquith Brothers Limited
- Type: Limited company
- Industry: Automobiles
- Founded: 1912
- Headquarters: Thornhill, West Yorkshire
- Key people: Michael Asquith Fox

Asquith Brothers Limited is a British manufacturer of automobiles.

== Company history ==
The company was founded on July 30, 1912, in Thornhill near Dewsbury in West Yorkshire. In the 1970s there were experiments with formula racing cars. Production of automobiles and kits began in 1985. The brand name is Asquith. Michael Asquith Fox heads the company. A total of around 40 copies have been created so far.

There is no connection with Asquith Motors, who use the same brand name.

== Vehicles ==
The first model was the MPH in its first version. This was the replica of the Riley MPH, a 1930s roadster. The body was made of aluminium. Many parts came from Riley. The new price for a complete vehicle was from £40,000. Around six copies were made between 1985 and 1999. The vehicle should still be available to order.

In 1989 the second and later the third version supplemented the range. A spaceframe frame formed the basis. The fenders and trunk lid were made of fiberglass. Many parts came from the Ford Sierra. The construction costs were only around £20,000. Around 30 copies were made by 1999. This model is also still available to order.

The penny has been on sale since 1999. This is something like a modern version of the Bond Bug, but with four wheels. A Yamaha R1 engine with 170 hp powers the vehicles. So far, around four copies have been made.

== Literature ==
- George Nicholas Georgano (ed.): The Beaulieu Encyclopedia of the Automobile. Volume 1: A-F . Fitzroy Dearborn Publishers, Chicago 2001, ISBN 978-1-57958-293-7 , p. 82
- Steve Hole: A-Z of Kit Cars. The definitive encyclopaedia of the UK's kit-car industry since 1949. Haynes Publishing, Sparkford 2012, ISBN 978-1-84425-677-8 , p. 269
