= Jane Bonham Carter, Baroness Bonham-Carter of Yarnbury =

British politician and life peer (born 1957)

The Right Honourable The Baroness Bonham-Carter of Yarnbury
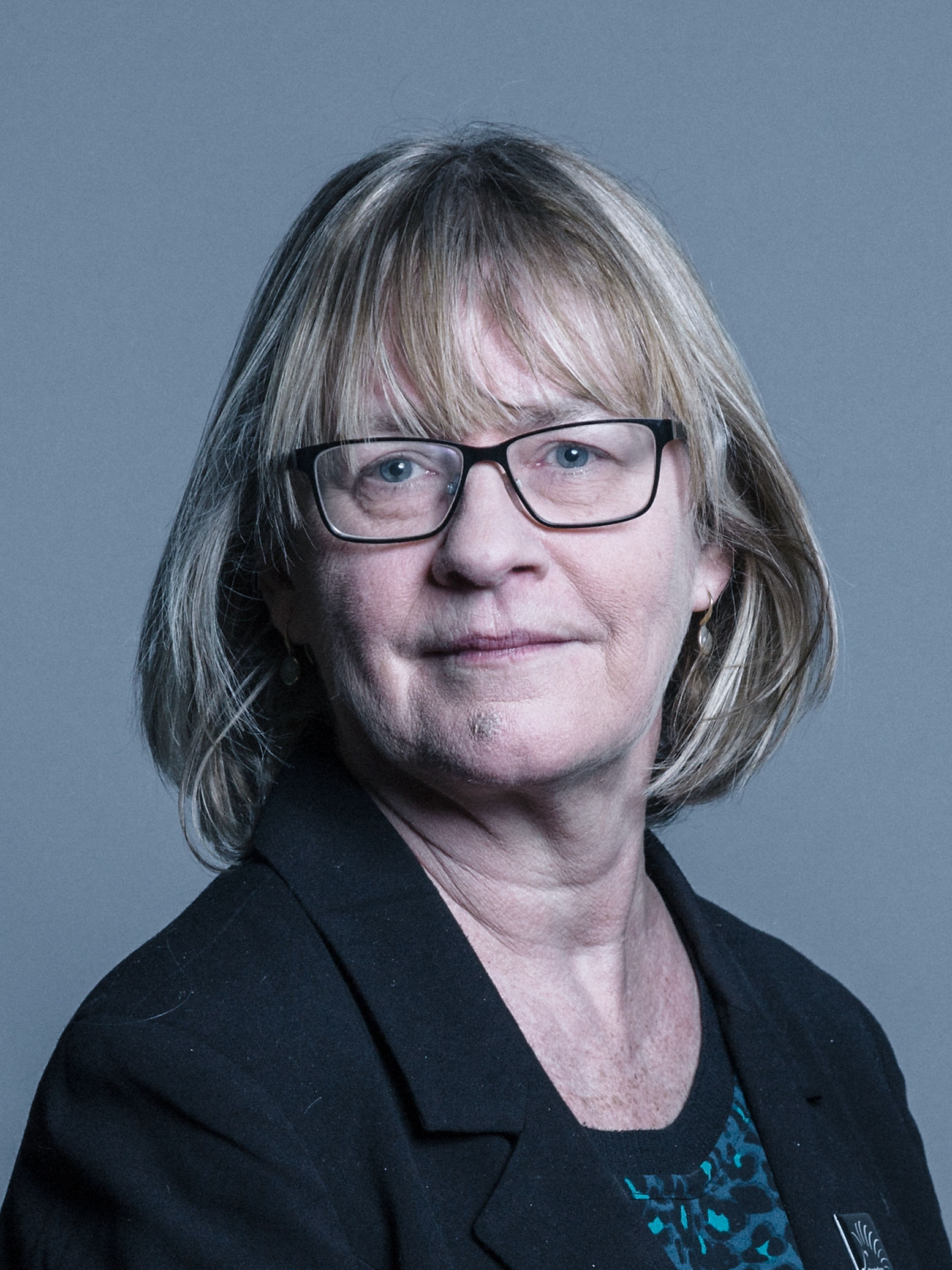

Member of the House of Lords
- Lord Temporal
- Life peerage 23 June 2004

Personal details
- Born: 20 October 1957 (age 69)
- Party: Liberal Democrat
- Domestic partner: Tim Razzall, Baron Razzall
- Education: University College London

Jane Bonham Carter, Baroness Bonham-Carter of Yarnbury (born 20 October 1957), is a British politician and life peer. A member of the Liberal Democrats, she has been a member of the House of Lords since 2004.

== Background ==
=== Family ===
Bonham Carter hails from the Bonham Carter family. Her great-grandfather was H. H. Asquith, the former Prime Minister, and her grandparents were Maurice Bonham-Carter and Violet Bonham Carter. Her father, Mark Bonham Carter was a Liberal MP before becoming a Liberal Democrat life peer. Her aunt Laura Bonham-Carter married Jo Grimond, who was to become Leader of the Liberal Party. Her family is the only example so far where three generations have received life peerages under the Life Peerages Act 1958. (Note: The titles of the three judges Baron Russell of Killowen were created under the Appellate Jurisdiction Act 1876.) Her maternal grandfather is the American publisher Condé Nast.

In 2008 she was reported to be the partner of Lord Razzall. Bonham Carter has declared the relationship in the House of Lords Register of Interests.

Her cousins include the actors Crispin Bonham Carter, Helena Bonham Carter and fellow Liberal Democrat parliamentarian Raymond Asquith, 3rd Earl of Oxford and Asquith.

=== Education ===
Bonham-Carter was educated at St. Paul's Girls' School, an independent school in Brook Green, Hammersmith, west London, and at University College London.

== Career ==
Bonham-Carter worked in television before being raised to the peerage, spending time at both the BBC and Channel 4, producing programmes such as Panorama, Newsnight and A Week In Politics.

In 1996 she became the Liberal Democrats' Director of Communications, a role she held through the 1997 election before returning to a career in television as an independent producer at Brook Lapping Productions, where she produced a number of documentaries for Channel 4, the BBC and ITV, including the award-winning series Maggie: the First Lady.

On 23 June 2004 she was created a life peeress as Baroness Bonham-Carter of Yarnbury, of Yarnbury in the County of Wiltshire, and was appointed Liberal Democrat Spokesperson for Broadcasting and the Arts.

She has been a member of various House of Lords Select Committees, including the BBC Charter review set up in 2005, and the Parliamentary Communications Committee.

After the formation of the coalition government in 2010, she was elected deputy convenor of Liberal Democrat Peers and was appointed co-chair of the Liberal Democrat Parliamentary Party Committee for Culture, Olympics, Media and Sport, which includes the role of Liberal Democrat spokesperson on DCMS matters in the House of Lords.

Bonham-Carter has served on the advisory committee of the thinktank Centre Forum since 2005, and RAPT (Rehabilitation for Addicted Prisoners Trust) since 1999. She was a board member of the National Campaign for the Arts from 2010 to 2012.

She is a Vice-President of the Debating Group.

On 19 April 2015, it was announced that Bonham-Carter would be a patron of the Studio Theatre, Ashley Road, Salisbury.

== Expenses ==
Bonham Carter attracted criticism in 2008 when it was revealed that she and her partner, Tim Razzall, had both claimed House of Lords expenses for a flat that they shared, although it was not claimed that a breach of the rules had occurred. The House of Lords expenses system was later changed to give peers a flat rate irrespective of their residence.

== Arms ==
Coat of arms of Jane Bonham Carter, Baroness Bonham-Carter of Yarnbury

Escutcheon
Quarterly 1st & 4th Azure two lions combatant Or collared and lined Gules supporting with their interior paws a mural crown Gold 2nd & 3rd Gules a sword erect between in chief two cross crosslets fitchee Argent over all a chevron of the last.
Motto
Trusty To The End

== See also ==
- Bonham Carter family
- Asquith family
