= Earl of Oxford and Asquith =

Earldom in the Peerage of the United Kingdom

Earldom of Oxford and Asquith
- Blazon Arms: Sable on a Fess between three Cross Crosslets Argent a Portcullis of the field. Crest: Issuant out of Clouds proper, a Mascle Gules. Supporters: On either side a Lion Purpure, charged on the shoulder with an open Book Argent, edged Or.
- Creation date: 10 February 1925
- Created by: King George V
- Peerage: Peerage of the United Kingdom
- First holder: H. H. Asquith
- Present holder: Raymond Asquith, 3rd Earl of Oxford and Asquith
- Heir apparent: Mark Julian Asquith, Viscount Asquith
- Remainder to: The 1st Earl's heirs male of the body lawfully begotten
- Subsidiary titles: Viscount Asquith
- Status: Extant
- Motto: Sine macula macla ("Spotless")

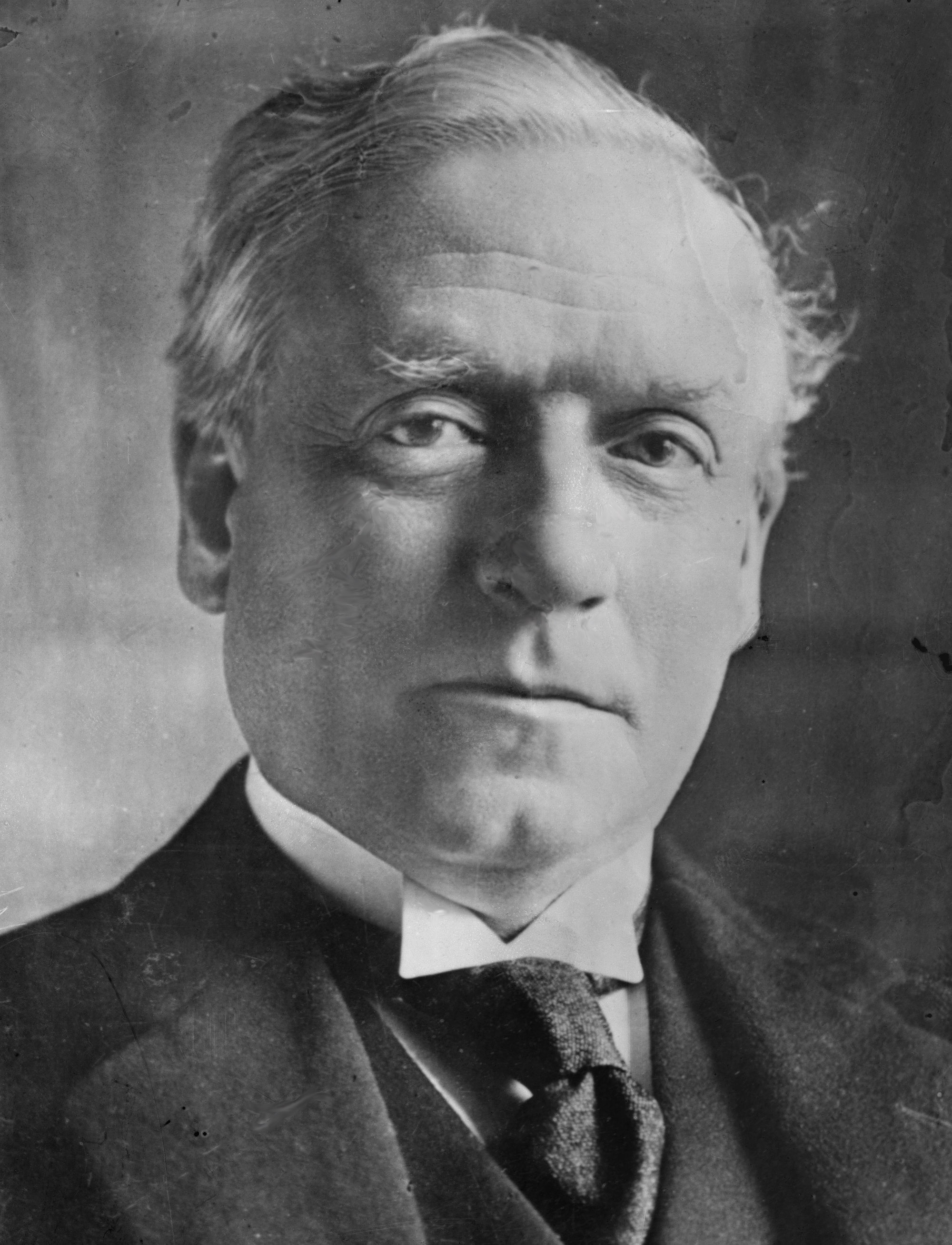
Herbert Henry Asquith, 1st Earl of Oxford and Asquith

Earl of Oxford and Asquith is a title in the Peerage of the United Kingdom. It was created in 1925 for the Liberal politician H. H. Asquith. He was Home Secretary from 1892 to 1895, Chancellor of the Exchequer from 1905 to 1908, Leader of the Liberal Party from 1908 to 1926 and Prime Minister of the United Kingdom from 1908 to 1916. Asquith was made Viscount Asquith, of Morley in the West Riding of the County of York, at the same time, also in the Peerage of the United Kingdom. This title is used as a courtesy title by the heir apparent to the earldom.

Asquith had originally wanted to be created simply Earl of Oxford. However, this greatly offended the collaterals of the de Vere family, members of which had been earls of Oxford, for centuries and of the Harley family, members of which had been earls of Oxford and earls Mortimer. In the face of opposition from them, another title had to be selected – the formal title 'Earl of Oxford and Asquith' was finally decided as a compromise, with it being abbreviated to 'Earl of Oxford' in everyday conversation and letters, which still irritated the other families.

The first Earl was succeeded in 1928 by his grandson, his eldest son Raymond Asquith having been killed in World War I. The second Earl was a diplomat and administrator and served as Governor of the Seychelles from 1962 to 1967. He died in 2011 and was succeeded by his son, the third Earl and current holder of the title. The current Lord Oxford and Asquith is a retired MI6 officer.

Several other members of the Asquith family have also gained distinction. Raymond Asquith, eldest son of the first Earl and father of the second, was a barrister and intellectual. Herbert Asquith, second son of the first Earl, was a poet, novelist and lawyer. Arthur Melland Asquith (1883–1939), third son of the first Earl, was a Brigadier-General in the Army. Cyril Asquith, fourth son of the first Earl, was a Lord of Appeal in Ordinary and was created a life peer as Baron Asquith of Bishopstone in 1951. Violet Asquith, better known under her married name of Violet Bonham Carter, was a Liberal politician and was created a life peer as Baroness Asquith of Yarnbury in 1964. Her eldest son Mark Bonham Carter was a publisher and politician and was created a life peer as Baron Bonham-Carter in 1986. His daughter is the life peer Jane Bonham Carter, Baroness Bonham-Carter of Yarnbury.

Raymond Bonham Carter, second son of Baroness Asquith of Yarnbury, was a banker and the father of the noted actress Helena Bonham Carter and of Edward Bonham Carter. Elizabeth Asquith (better known by her married name of Elizabeth Bibesco), the only daughter from the second marriage of the first Earl, was a moderately celebrated author who, for a short while, dated the Spanish grandee José Antonio Primo de Rivera (founder of FET y de las JONS) before marrying the Romanian lawyer, diplomat and writer Prince Antoine Bibesco in 1919. Anthony Asquith, only son from the second marriage of the first Earl, became a successful film director. Dominic Asquith, second son of the second Earl, is a prominent diplomat and served as British Ambassador to Iraq from 2006 to 2007. Margot Asquith (née Tennant), second wife of the first Earl, a socialite, author and wit, became the Countess of Oxford and Asquith upon her husband's becoming the first Earl.

The family seat is Mells Manor, near Mells, Somerset.

== Earls of Oxford and Asquith (1925) ==
- Herbert Henry Asquith, 1st Earl of Oxford and Asquith (1852–1928)
  - Raymond Asquith (1878–1916)
- Julian Edward George Asquith, 2nd Earl of Oxford and Asquith (1916–2011)
- Raymond Benedict Bartholomew Michael Asquith, 3rd Earl of Oxford and Asquith (b. 1952)

The heir apparent is the present holder's only son, Mark Julian Asquith, Viscount Asquith (b. 1979), who is married to Helen, daughter of Christopher Prentice.
The heir apparent's heir apparent is his son, George Hannibal Asquith (b. 2011).

== Line of succession and other titles held by descendants of the 1st Earl ==
Line of succession (simplified)
- Herbert Henry Asquith, 1st Earl of Oxford and Asquith (1852–1928)
  - Raymond Herbert Asquith (1878–1916)
    - Julian Edward George Asquith, 2nd Earl of Oxford and Asquith (1916–2011)
      - Raymond Benedict Bartholomew Michael Asquith, 3rd Earl of Oxford and Asquith (born 1952)
        - (1) Mark Julian Asquith, Viscount Asquith (b. 1979)
          - (2) Hon. George Hannibal Asquith (b. 2011)
      - (3) Hon. Sir Dominic Antony Gerard Asquith (b. 1957)
        - (4) Thomas Anthony Gerard Asquith (b. 1992)
        - (5) William Raphael Augustine Asquith (b. 1994)
  - Hon. Herbert Dixon Asquith (1881–1947)
    - Michael Henry Asquith (1914-2004)
      - male issue and descendants in remainder
    - Simon Anthony Roland Asquith (1919–1973)
      - Conrad Robin Asquith (1945–2020)
      - other male issue and descendants in remainder
  - Helen Violet Bonham Carter, Baroness Asquith of Yarnbury née Violet Asquith (1887–1969)
    - Mark Raymond Bonham Carter, Baron Bonham-Carter (1922–1994)
      - Jane Mary Bonham Carter, Baroness Bonham-Carter of Yarnbury (b. 1957)
  - Cyril Asquith, Baron Asquith of Bishopstone (1890–1954)
    - Hon. Paul Asquith (1927–1984)
      - male issue and descendants in remainder

== See also ==
- Asquith family
- Earl of Oxford
- Venetia Stanley
