= Anne Asquith =

British code breaker (1916-1998)

The Right Honourable The Countess of Oxford and Asquith

Personal details
- Born: Anne Mary Celestine Palairet; 14 November 1916 Paris, France
- Died: 19 August 1998 (aged 81) Frome, Somerset, England
- Spouse: Julian Asquith (m. 1947)
- Children: 5
- Parent: Michael Palairet (father)
- Education: St Anne's College, Oxford
- Known for: Code breaking

Anne Mary Celestine Asquith, Countess of Oxford and Asquith (née Palairet; 14 November 1916 – 19 August 1998) was a British code breaker who became the Countess of Oxford and Asquith upon her marriage in 1947 to Julian Asquith, 2nd Earl of Oxford and Asquith.

== Life ==
She was born in Paris in 1916 to Sir Michael Palairet, a career diplomat, and his wife, Lady Mary de Vere Palairet (née Studd; 1895-1977), and brought up in the Roman Catholic faith to which her parents had converted.

She was raised in Japan, China and Bucharest, where she would help her father by decoding messages that had been sent to him. In Japan, she survived an earthquake when she was six and later, her family was present during the Chinese civil war. She had an affection for Bucharest, where she took the baccalaureate and learnt French.

She continued her studies in Paris before studying at St Anne's College, Oxford, although she did not take her finals. At college, she met Julian Asquith, who was already the Earl of Oxford and Asquith. They were to marry years later.

During World War II, she worked at the code breaking centre of Bletchley Park, exploiting her knowledge of linguistics and codes, before joining the WAAF. They sent her to Palestine in 1945, where she should have been off-duty at the King David Hotel when it was bombed in 1946, but serendipity saw her exchange shifts, and she was working elsewhere when the bomb went off.

== Marriage and children ==
She married Julian Asquith, 2nd Earl of Oxford and Asquith, at the Brompton Oratory in 1947. Her husband took diplomatic postings in Libya, Zanzibar, and St Lucia, and he was the governor in the Seychelles. At that time, one could not fly easily to these islands, but ships occasionally visited them.

Lord and Lady Oxford had five children – two sons, both diplomats, and three daughters (the middle one married to another diplomat):

- Lady (Mary) Annunziata Asquith (born 28 July 1948), partner of Patrick Anson, 5th Earl of Lichfield.
- Lady Katharine Rose Celestine Asquith (born 1 October 1949), in 1970 married Adam Ridley, divorced 1976; married secondly in 1985 Nathaniel Page, son of Sir John Page.
- Raymond Benedict Bartholomew Asquith, 3rd Earl of Oxford and Asquith (born 24 August 1952)
- Lady Clare Perpetua Frances Asquith (born 28 March 1955)
- The Hon. Sir Dominic Antony Gerard Asquith, KCMG (born 7 February 1957), a former British Ambassador to Iraq, Egypt and Libya.

Lord Oxford inherited the estate of Mells Manor from his mother Katharine Asquith, younger daughter of Sir John Horner, of Mells, and his wife Lady Frances (née Graham).

Lady Oxford died in Frome in 1998. Lord Oxford died, aged 94, on 16 January 2011. He was succeeded in his peerage titles, which he had held for over eighty years, by their elder son, Raymond, a former British diplomat and elected hereditary member of the House of Lords.
