= Red Rice, Hampshire =

Hamlet in Hampshire, England

Coordinates: 51.176995°N 1.51788°W

Red Rice
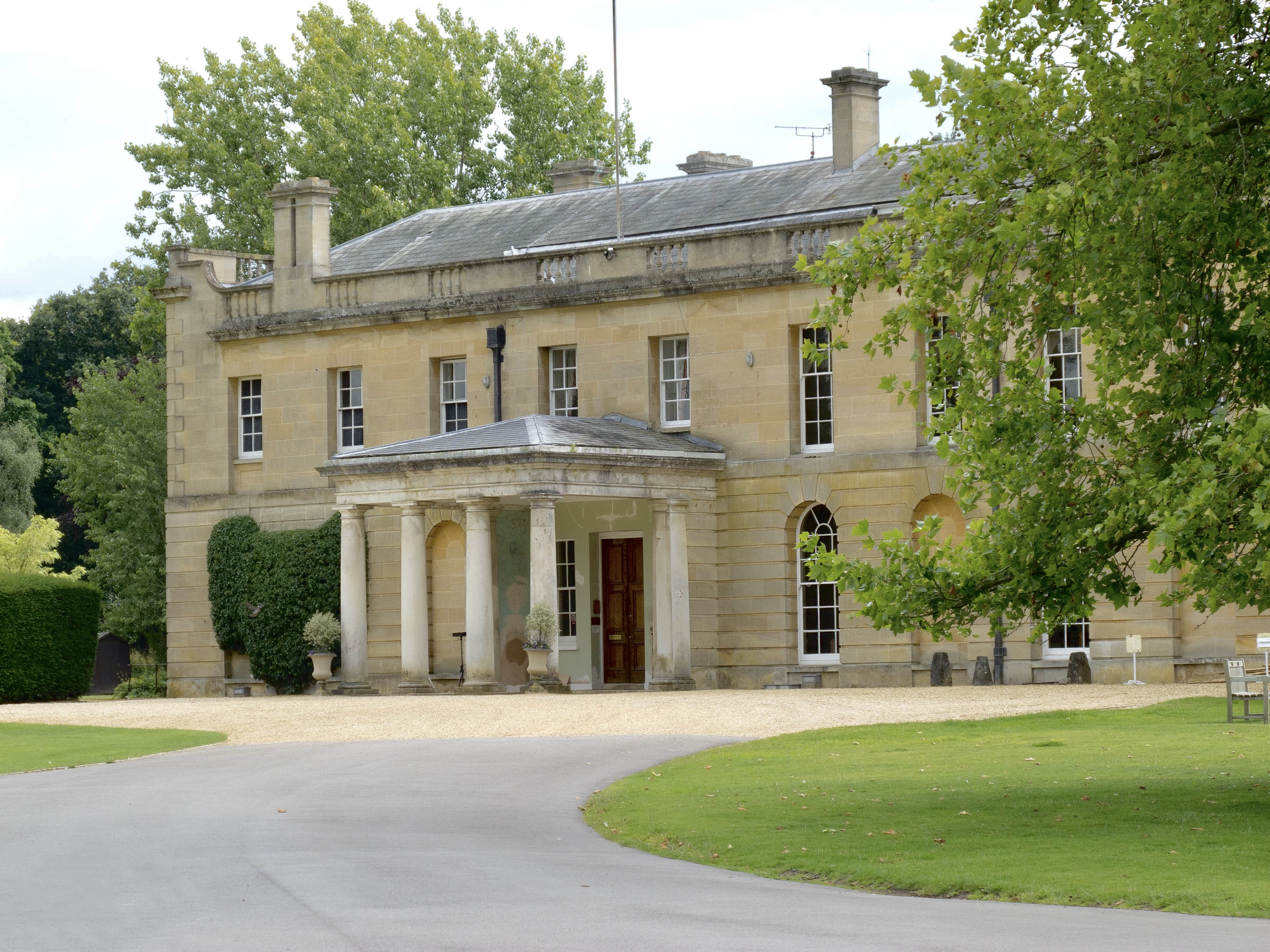
- Front facade of Red Rice

- Location within Hampshire
- OS grid reference: SU3379942084
- District: Test Valley
- Shire county: Hampshire
- Region: South East
- Country: England
- Sovereign state: United Kingdom
- Post town: Andover
- Postcode district: SP11
- Dialling code: 01264
- Police: Hampshire and Isle of Wight
- Fire: Hampshire and Isle of Wight
- Ambulance: South Central
- UK Parliament: North West Hampshire

Red Rice is a hamlet and country house in the civil parish of Upper Clatford, south-west of Andover in the English county of Hampshire.

== Etymology ==
The name originates from:

- The word 'rice', meaning shrubby twigs or withies (such as wild dogwood, which is abundant locally, and whose branches turn bright red in winter).
- The Anglo-Saxon term 'Rede Ric', meaning a council chamber.
- The brick colour of clay loam, chalk and iron oxide from Sidbury.

== Red Rice House and park ==
Red Rice has a house built in an early Georgian park probably built around 1740. The outside is faced with Clipsham stone. It has a slate roof and arched windows. There are 13 bays and a porte cochere of 4 Tuscan columns. The stables areas include a clock tower and an arch of rubbed bricks. The park was extended by the diversion of a local road and the building has been extended. William Burn re-modelled the house in the mid 19th century. More buildings were added when the site became a school in 1961. The gate lodge and gatepiers are designated English Heritage Listed Building Designation Grade II.

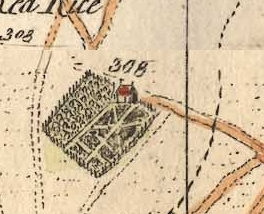
1759 map

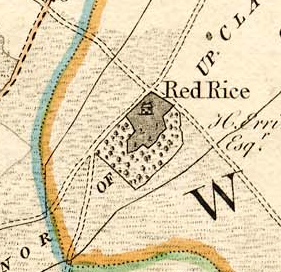
1791 map

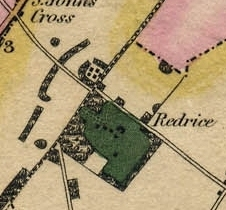
1826 map

Aerial, between 1933 and 1960

Aerial, circa 1966

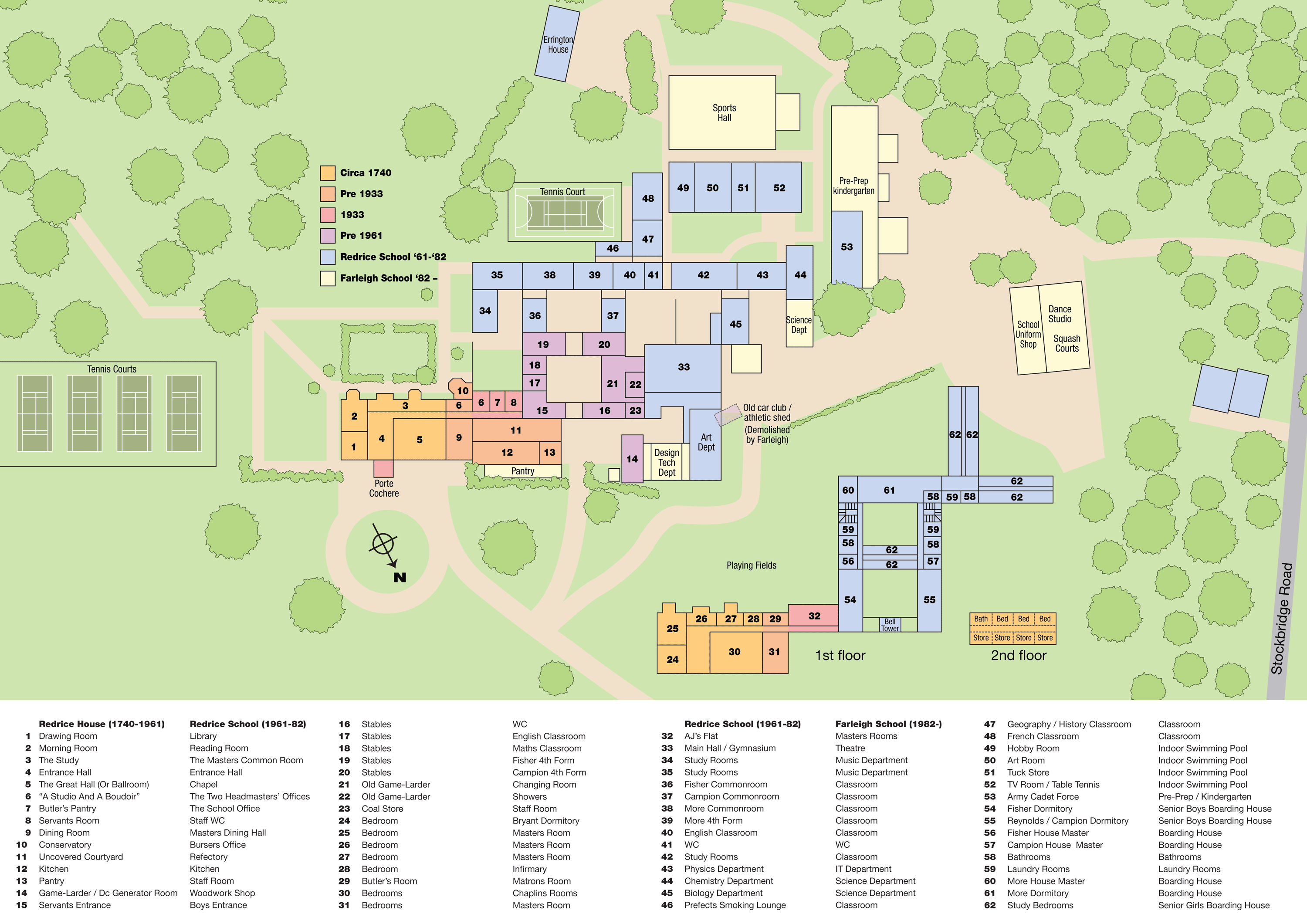
Redrice plan

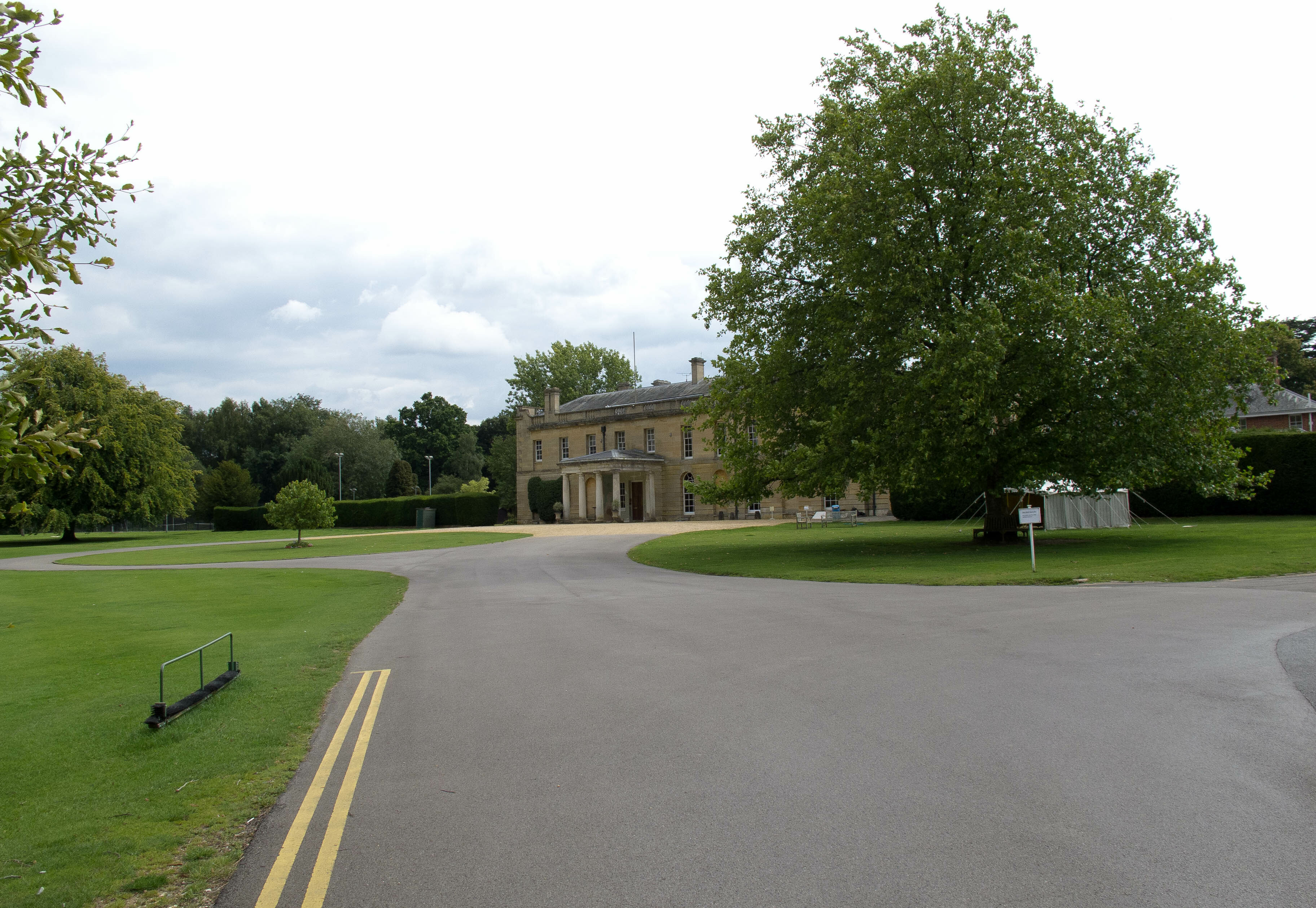
View from the front drive

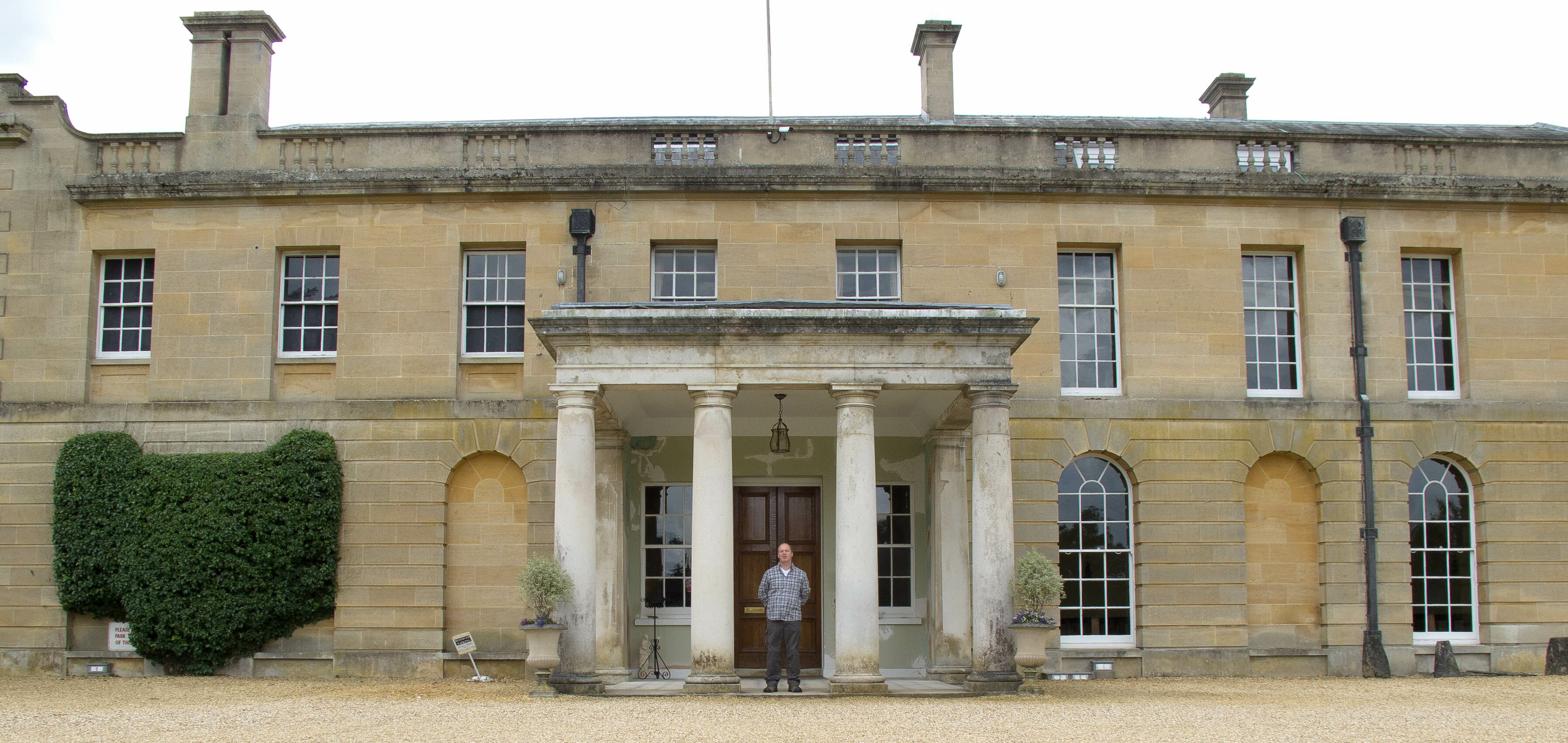
The front of the House

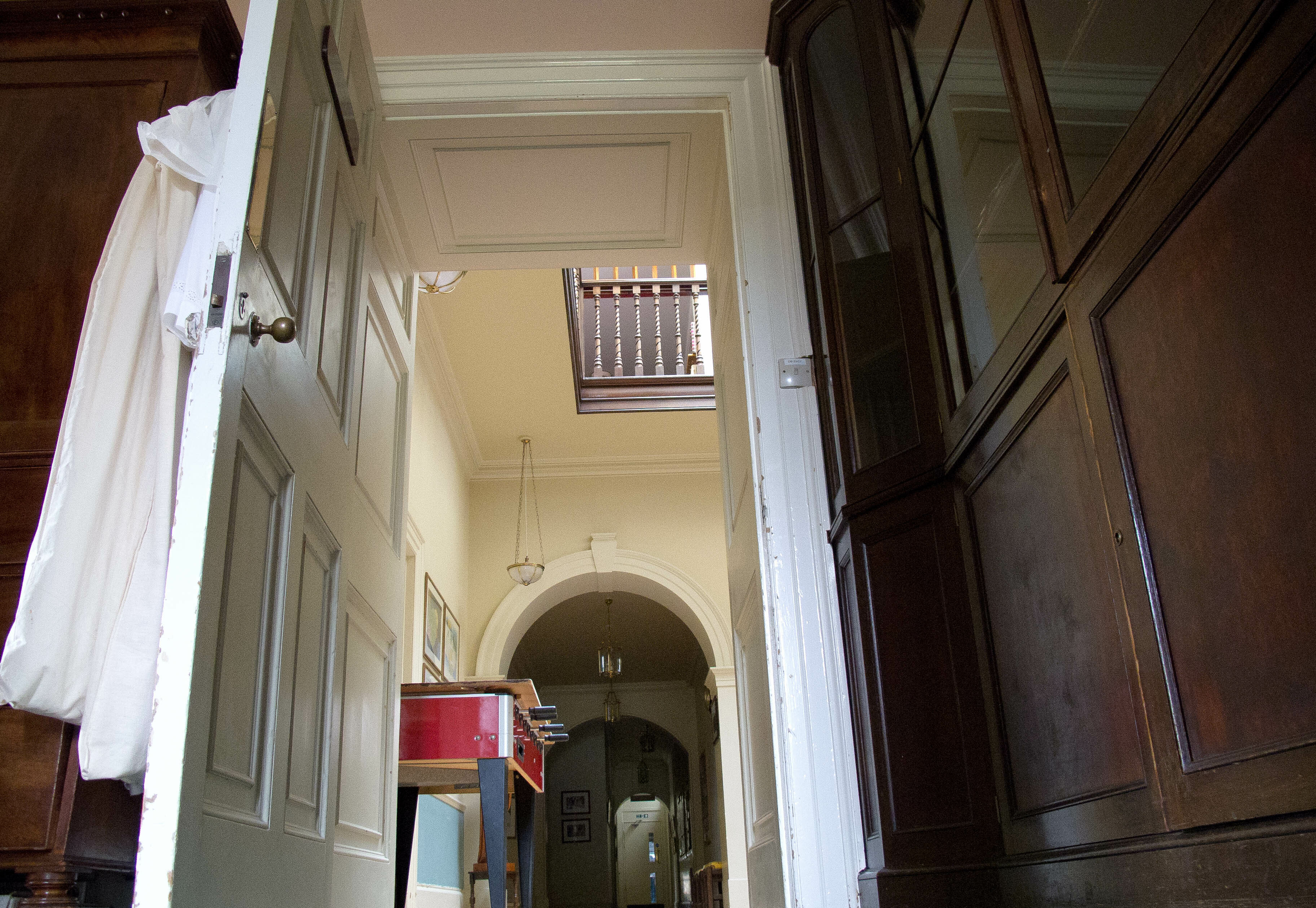
View of the main corridor

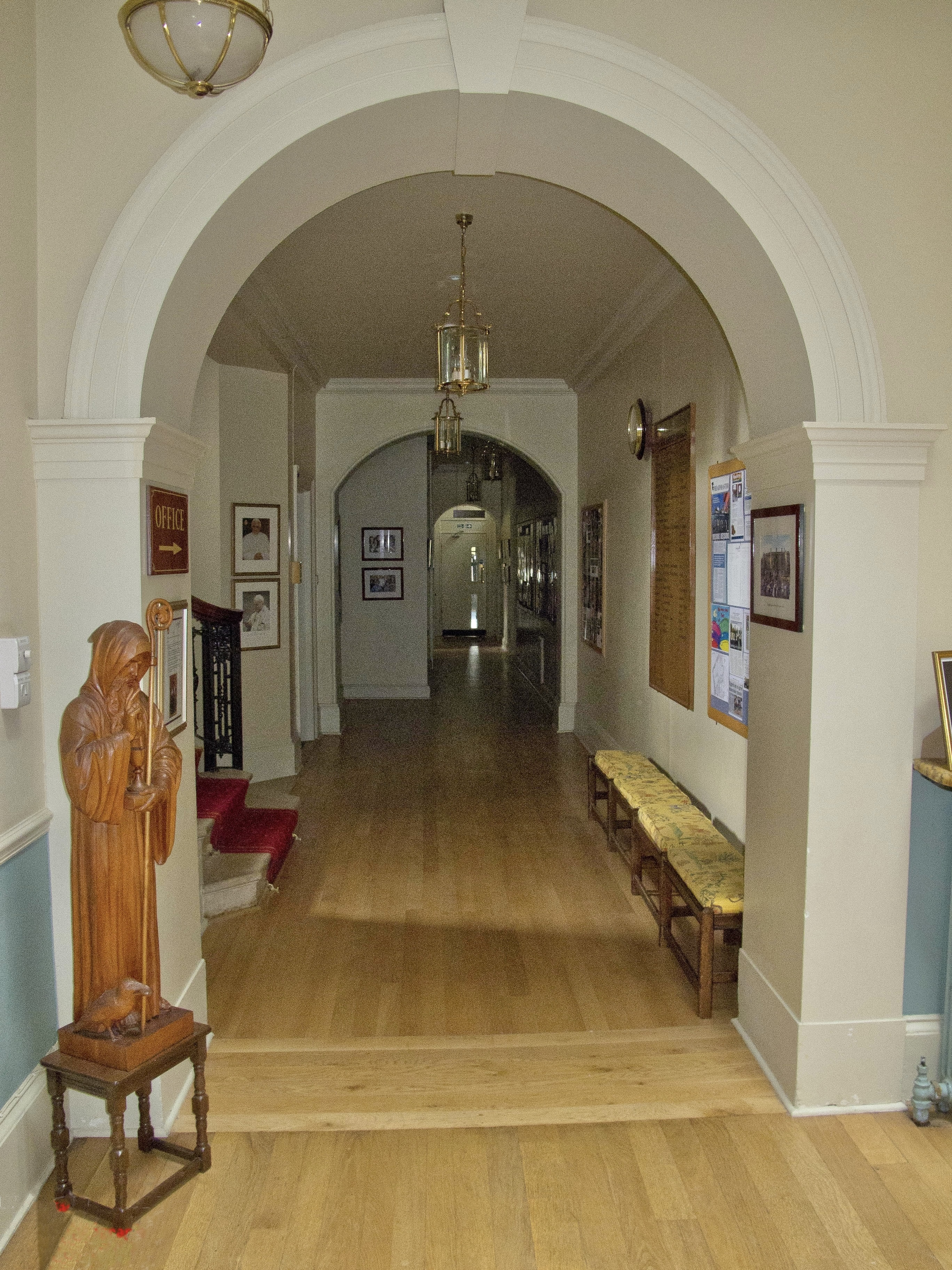
View of the main corridor

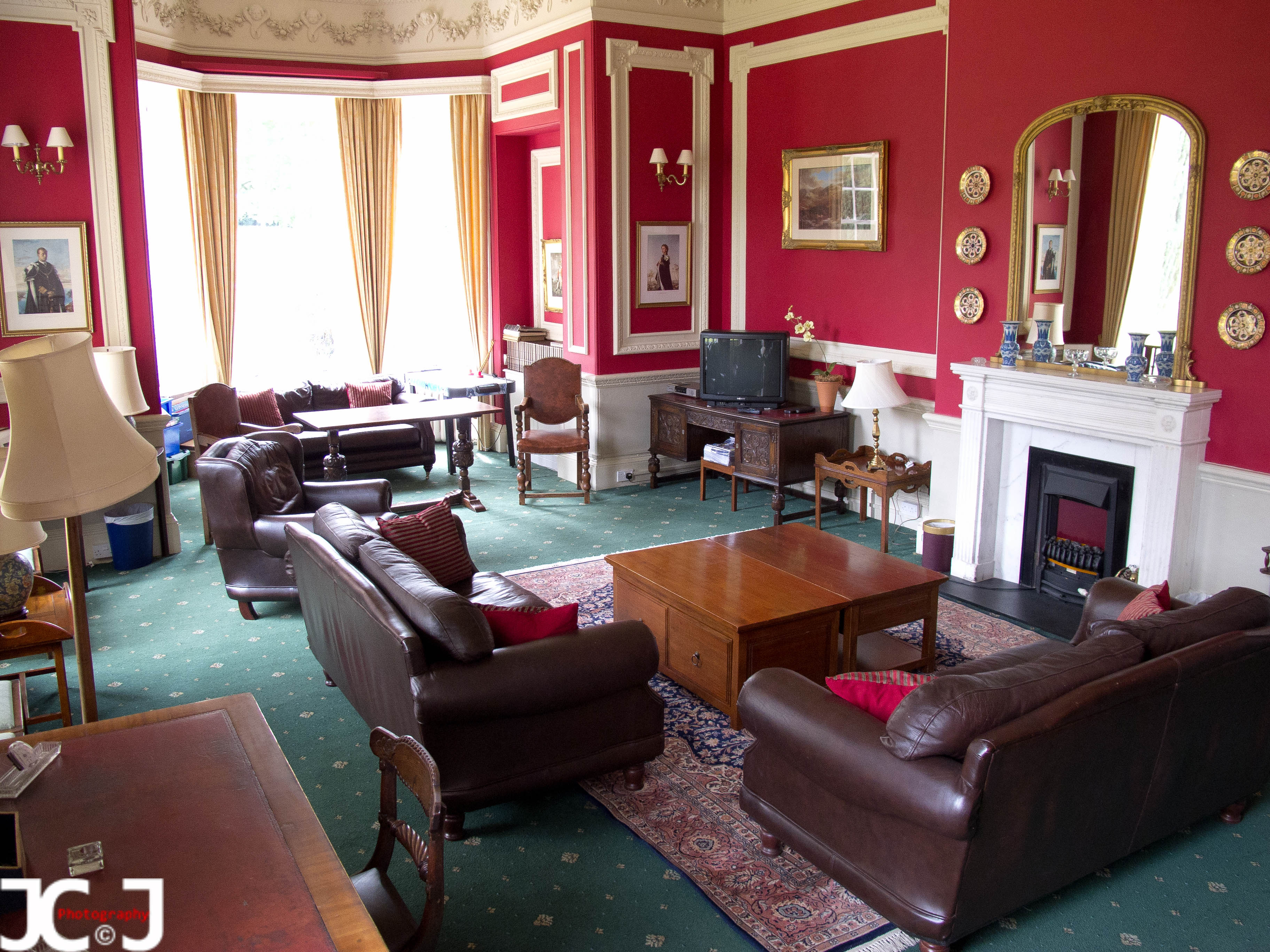
The location of the building's original reading room

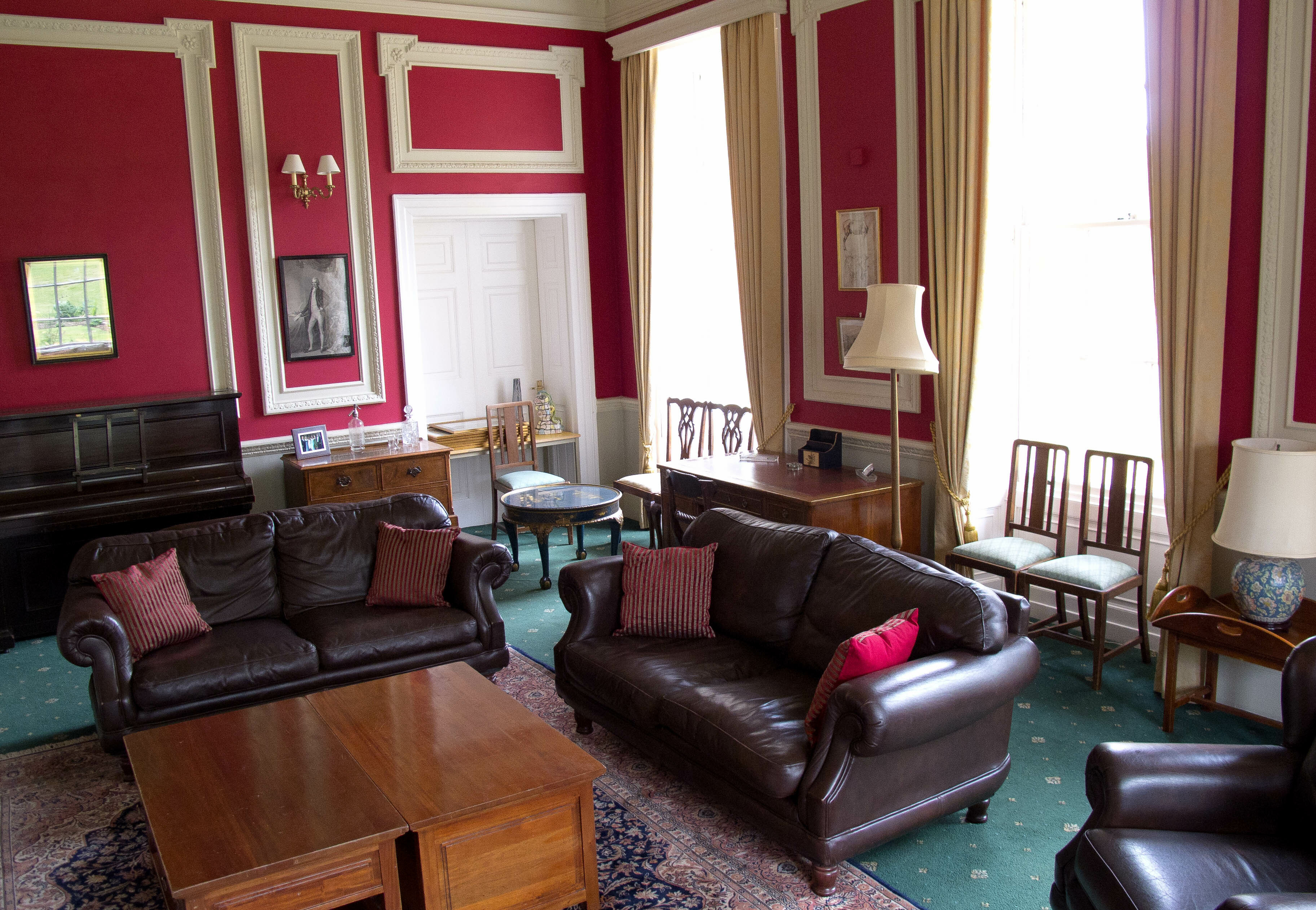
The location of the building's original reading room

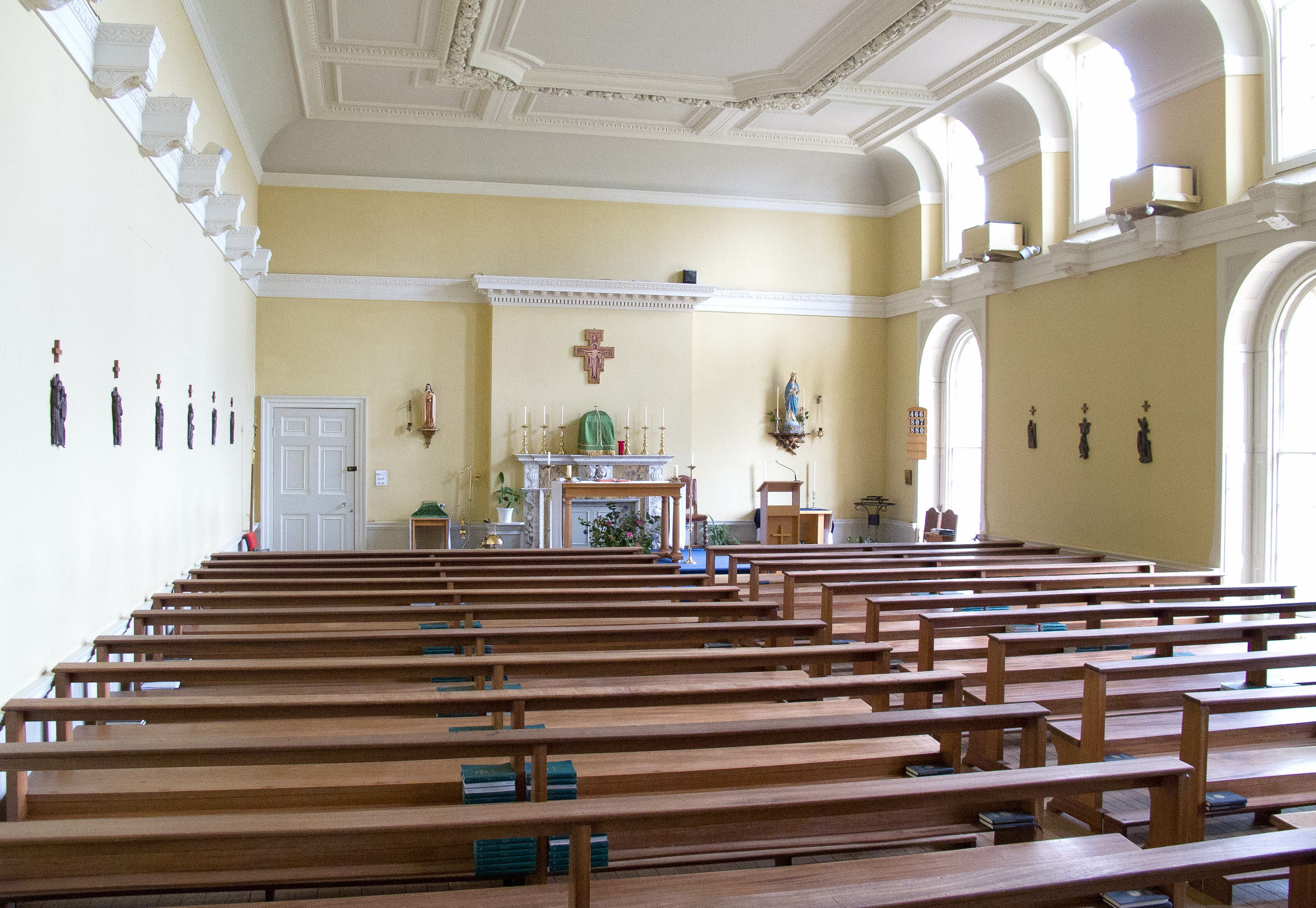
The Grand Hall (ballroom), converted into a Chapel

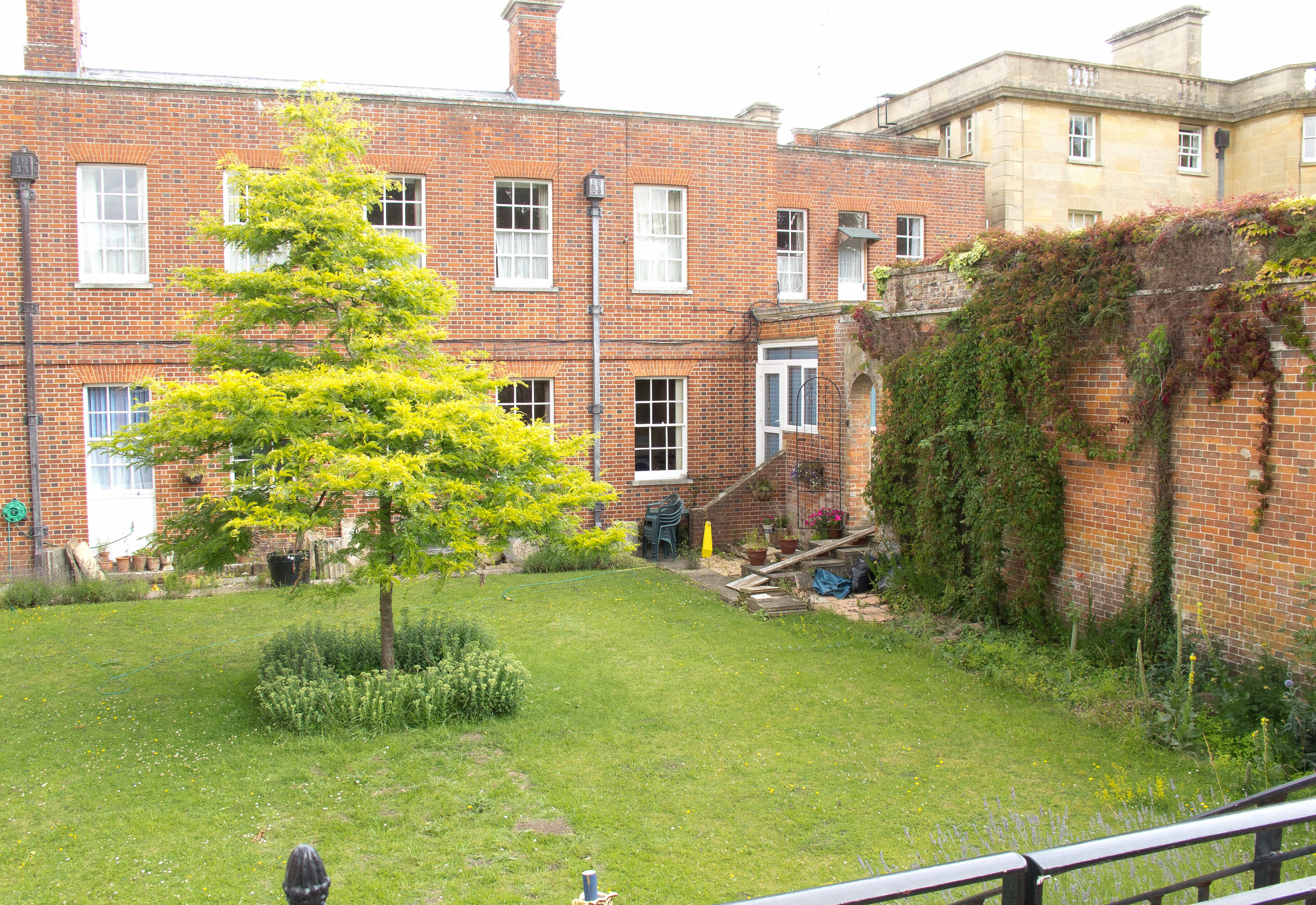
Rear of the 'Nursery wing', showing the remains of a larger walled enclosure

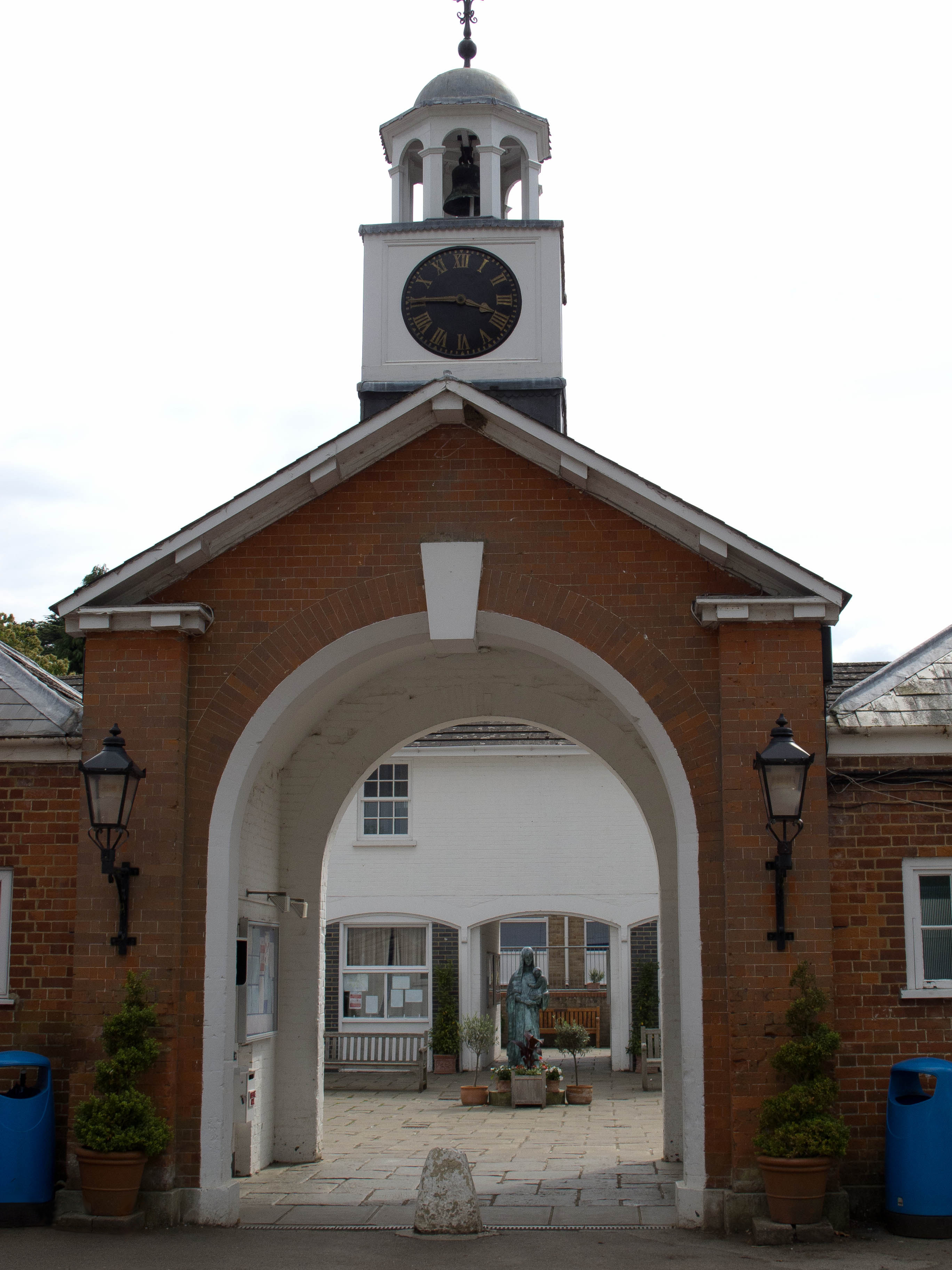
Entrance to the Stable area

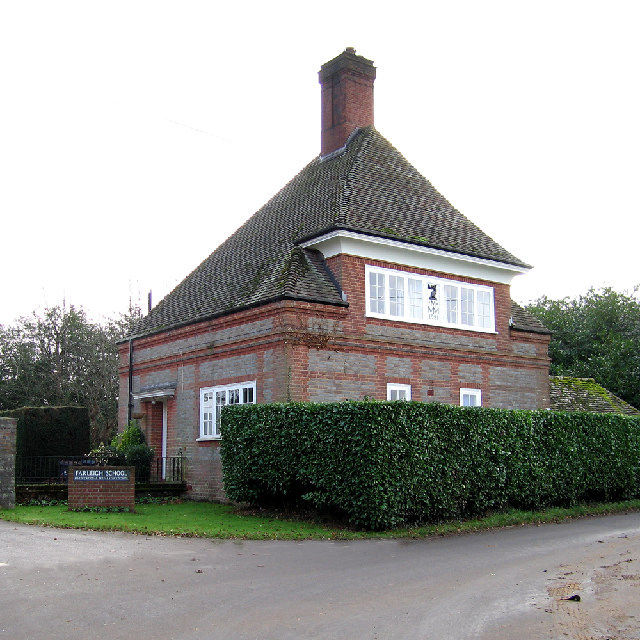
The Gatehouse

=== Historical significance ===
Red Rice was home of the family, associated with the Prince of Wales (later King George IV), in a secret and illegal marriage to the Roman Catholic mistress, Maria Anne Fitzherbert. The building was used during World War II by American forces and used for various secret and high-level planning. This included the reserve headquarters of the D-Day Landings, should the primary location become unserviceable.

=== Early history ===
The current House was built around 1740 with red brick. A water-supply system was installed during the period, but it is not clear where the supply originated. The parts examined in 1960 by Mr Wilfred Carpenter Turner, an expert on older buildings, were found to be still operating and in very good condition.

- 986. The lands were owned by the Abbey of Wherwell, when it was founded by Queen Aelfrida, the widow of King Edgar.
- 1086. The area is recorded in the Domesday book.
- c. 1534. Around the time of the dissolution of the monasteries, the Abbey's lands were granted to Thomas West, Lord De La Warr of Delaware.
- 1710. The origin of the house is unclear. Abbotts Ann was the property of Thomas Pitt who purchased Little Ann in 1710, and probably acquired the neighbouring manor about the same date.
- 1726. Governor Pitt dies.
- 1730. It is believed a map of about 1730 shows the 'Rice Field' and that no house appears on maps until 1760.
- 1740. The house may have been built by General John Richmond Webb, a subordinate of the Duke of Marlborough, in about 1740. It is claimed that the trees in the park surrounding the house represent the troop line-up at the battle of Malplaquet in 1709. There is no evidence the park's trees showed battle lines, other than the row of beeches from St John's cross along the Fullerton towards Red Rice; which could have appeared like two rows of soldiers.
- 1760. The House appears in maps of 1760 and suggests it still belonged to the Pitt family, along with lands in Abbotts Ann

=== Errington family ===
- 1730. Mr John Errington lives at Red Rice, married to Maria Levery. They have a daughter called 'Mary' (born about 1730) and a son named Henry Errington (birth date not known).
- 1731. The estate of Upper Clatford (including Red Rice) was the property of George Tarrant.
- 1733. The Upper Clatford estate was sold by George Tarrant to William Evans in 1733.
- 1746. John Errington dies, and his widow Maria remarries the same year.
- 1755. The late John Errington's daughter marries 'Walter Smyth', the 2nd son of Sir John Smythe.
- 1756. Henry Errington becomes the Uncle of Maria Anne Smythe (later to become Maria Fitzherbert). The Smythe family move closer geographically to the Errington family.
- 1759. Appears on Isaac Taylor's survey of Hampshire. The 1759 maps suggests a rectangular area and the existence of a single 'red' building at the northern edge of a wooden parkland with ornamental pathways. The main road passes along the north border, and the eastern edge has a footpath marked.
- 1763. Leases describe Redrice House as a:'genteel, modern built house with large and pleasant gardens or walks, all in thorough repair at present, it is very well adapted for the reception of any nobleman or gentleman of fortune with a small family as a hunting seat, as it stands in fine healthy and sporting country, but it is not fit for a large family, nor a constant residence, there not being a foot of land belonging to it but yards and gardens. It is at present well tenanted but as the lease expires within a year, it is not certain that a good tenant can readily be got for it, and if it happens to be untenanted it will be attended with the expense of keeping servants there to take care of both house and gardens which, if once suffered to run out of order will cost money to repair these circumstances reducing the value of it greatly as it is not for everybody's money. It may be long on hand before a purchaser can be found for it.'

Mansion and grounds. 49 acres, 14p.
Garden. 2 acres, 2r, 16p.
Paddock pasture. 1 acre, 3r, 34p. (occupier: J. Parsons).
Rents:
Pasture and Wood. Arable land 6 UKP 10 shillings and 6 pence.
Gardens - walled gardens, Cottage and gardens. 1 UKP 17 shillings and 6 pence.

- 1763. Sir Brian Broughton Delves of Broughton, Staffordshire, bought various estates in Hampshire, including the Abbotts Ann property, which he contracted to purchase from 'the Honourable Thomas Pitt, esquire,' great-grandson of Governor Pitt and afterwards first Lord Camelford. He may also have purchased the manor of Upper Clatford and lands in Upper Clatford for 10,000 UKP, from the heirs-at-law of Maynard Guerin and of Sir Thomas Gatehouse.
- 1766. Sir Brian Broughton-Delves, 5th Baronet (1740–1766), dies childless. His younger brother (Thomas) became the 6th Baronet, but Brian left all his real estate in Hampshire to his wife Mary (Lady Delves).
- 1769. Henry Errington marries Sir Brian's widow and lives at Red Rice.
- 1774. At Henry Errington's house, Red Rice, Maria Smythe, his niece, met a future husband, Mr. Edward Weld (aged 45, with no children) who died three months later (1775) by accident or illness. Henry was more or less Maria's guardian, since her father had become an invalid. It is likely that Maria often visited and stayed at Red Rice.
- 1785. Henry Errington is heavily involved with his niece's attachment to the Prince of Wales. The secret and illegal marriage did not take place at Red Rice; the wedding occurred in the drawing room of Mrs Maria Fitzherbert's house in Park Street on the evening of 15 December. Her uncle, Henry Errington, gave her away.
- 1791. Referenced in map. The map shows the single building (appearing in a changed position since the 1759 map). No ornamental pathways are shown, and the land appears to be separated between a wooded, and less wooded area. The eastern corner of the land appears truncated; suggesting that some land was no longer part of the estate. The southern path is not shown, and appears to have been replaced by a new road on the western boundary.
- 1794. Henry Errington is visited by Mrs Fitzherbert at Red Rice, then travels to Kempshott, expecting a tête-à-tête dinner with the Prince of Wales to discuss the terms of their reconciliation.
- 1801. Map shows Red Rice at the western edge of the Hundreds of Wherwell [wherwell]
- 1812. Henry Errington's wife (Lady Delves) dies.
- 1817. Appears in Ordnance Survey map The eastern boundary appears increased. A possible walled area is shown at the northern edge. The main building(s) are shown; and a second set of buildings appear on the southern side. There is also a small square area; possibly containing a set of buildings with a T-shaped courtyard.
- 1819. Henry Errington died and the property came to his nephews, the Hon. William and the Rev. the Hon. Richard Hill, afterwards Noel-Hill, who succeeded in turn as third and fourth Lords Berwick. Henry Errington's character appears in a 1947 film named "Mrs. Fitzherbert".

=== Lords Berwick ===
At times before 1913, the external walls were rendered with cement. Creepers were planted. There were Flemish gables and sashes of cavernous plate-glass. The road at the front was diverted. A stable block (with a mounting block) and archway were built of red brick. A wide variety of trees were planted. It is not clear who was living in the House after 1819. It probably remained to be owned by Thomas, the childless 2nd Baron Berwick. Thomas died in 1832, leaving his estate to his brother, the new Baron.

- 1820. The Salisbury and Winchester Journal reports that the family make their (usual) donation of a good fat ox and two fat sheep to the poor of the parishes of Abbotts Ann and Clatford.
- 1826. Appears in map.
- 1827. 8 December, authority is given authorising the diversion of part of the Abbotts Ann to Titcomb Bridge and the Winchester Highway for 4 furlongs and 97 yards, of medium breadth of 40 feet. It was signed by Lord Berwick.
- 1840. The Tithe map shows the old road discontinued and the route marked by an avenue of trees. A track is shown arriving from the lodge gates to the stables. After the enclosure and diversion of the Fullerton road the grounds probably had two entrances. The main one where the North and South Lodges now stand, another on the Fullerton Road about three-quarters of a mile beyond the crossroads outside the school gates. Here a lodge still remains.
- 1842. William Noel Hill, 3rd Lord Berwick dies at Red Rice, aged 68, unmarried and intestate. His estate was administered in June 1843.

=== Best family ===
Three generations of Thomas Best lived there. Rev Thomas Best (1796-1880) purchased it in late 1845 or early 1846. He was a Magistrate, a Clerk in Holy Orders and Lord of the Manor. His son Thomas Best, Magistrate (1828-1886) was the second generation, and his son Captain Thomas George Best of the Royal Horse Artillery (1861-1926), the third generation, became the new Lord of the Manor; and then sold it. In 1844, they planned to divert the road that ran in front of the park (to make a more imposing drive leading to the house), build stables, start an arboretum, create pleasure grounds and develop a large, productive kitchen garden. The legacy of those early trees provided sequoias, mighty green and copper beeches, cedars, a rare weeping beech (outside Errington House) and innumerable elms. At the back of the house a great variety of trees were planted in such a way that a large number of different species of tree could be seen individually from the house.

- 1841/2. The Manor was purchased from the 3rd Lord Berwick by the Rev. Thomas Best. Thomas's wife, Sophia (Hardwick) came from a wealthy family.
- 1844. Plans were drawn by architect William Burn to remodel the house to become a mansion.
- 1845/46. In 1846 a red-brick stable block was built with archway (described as 'delightful, if architecturally uncouth'). The date of 1846 was still visible in the drain pipe heads 120 years later.
- 1846. The building works were delayed. The newspapers, Hampshire Advertiser and Worcestershire Chronicle report on a shooting at Red Rice. On 7 March, Thomas Mullard Shurmur, a foreman overseeing restorations at Red Rice, shot (almost mortally) Thomas Brealey (a 'time-keeper'). On 22 July at Winchester assizes, Shurmur was found guilty of 'Shooting with intent', and was sentenced to 14 years' transportation.
- 1858. Thomas Best, only son of Rev. Thomas Best marries Louisa Emily Shifner. An account of hunt meeting describes how the Rev Best arranged breakfast for about 100 attendees.
- 1871. Cornelius Palmer is recorded as working as a Coachman at Redrice.
- 1873. The Farmer's Magazine reports 'Thomas Best, of Red Rice House, Andover, sent a sample of Linseed cake, which was found to be adulterated with earth-nut cake and Buckwheat' Another sample of the cake was subsequently sent by Mr. Best, who stated that the cake cost him £12 per ton ready money, and that he bought it as the best English linseed cake.
- 1878. Gazetteer describes Red Rice House: 'the seat of the Rev. Thomas Best, BCL, JP, is a large mansion, about 3 miles SW of Andover, finely embosomed in woods and surrounded by open downs.'
- 1886. On 2 April, the newspapers, the Reading Mercury and the London Gazette report the death of Thomas Best. The house is let to Henry Adolphus Simonds, director of the H & G Simonds Brewery in Reading.
- 1896. Book published 'Hunting diary of Annie Best, wife of Thomas George Best'
- 1897. The newspaper the Reading Mercury reported on 31 July: 'on Monday afternoon a fire broke out in the servants' wing', 'the residence of Mr. H. Adolphus Simonds.'
- 1900/1901. Newspaper advertisements appear for staff with the correct qualifications. 'Stableman wanted. Must be abstainer, strong and willing.' 'Kitchen maid and scullery maid'. 'Groom and Gardener. With boys preferred, but not objected to without.'
- 1903. Thomas Best is named in a document relating to a 'Heating apparatus'.

=== Grantley family ===
Lord Grantley purchased Red Rice primarily for partridge shooting rather than hunting. During his ownership, the house underwent Edwardian alterations: rooms across two floors were removed to construct a Great Hall with a coved plaster ceiling and pillared entrance, an Adam-style ceiling was installed in the dining room, marble fireplaces were added, and plaster cherubs were fitted in the morning room.

- 1913. Lord Grantley (John Richard Brinsley Norton), 5th Baron Grantley (1855–1943) purchased the Red Rice estate from Captain Best. The sale was for more than 5,500 acres; including parts of the village of Abbotts Ann and Upper Clatford. The mansion was described as having 'excellent shooting and trout fishing' and cost over 100,000 UKP. The purchase occurred close to the birth of his first (and male) grandchild, by his eldest daughter's marriage to a Thomas Bevan. Perhaps he bought the estate for her.
- 1919 Lord Grantley's son, Richard Henry Brinsley married; and the estate was sold shortly afterwards.
- 1915/1924. Between these years, parts of the Estate were sold; including parts of Abbotts Ann and much of the surrounding countryside.

=== Miller Mundy family ===
The family made many changes and repairs to the building. Outbuildings were built to accommodate estate workers involved in the family's interests in sport, shooting and rearing pheasants and livestock. Four tennis courts and a secluded Japanese water-garden, trees and a path leading to two discreet rose-gardens, each containing a fountain, were built. In 1933 there were major renovations. The old, decaying, grey rendering was removed and the red brick walls were encased in honey-coloured Clipsham stone with the ground floor boldly rusticated and a beetling cornice at the top. All windows replaced by chain-hung sashes with proportioned panes. The roof was renewed and drains re-designed. Fire hydrants and static water-tanks were built around the house, fed from the original Regency water-supply system. Almost all internal timber was replaced due to damage from death-watch beetle and woodworm. Rooms were grouped into suites, plumbing and bathrooms were improved, and electrical outlets were added. They built some form of early oil-fired central heating. The interior was decorated throughout with a durable paint of beige colour. A nursery wing was built onto the main House, linking it to the stables. The new floorspace was used for a 'studio and a boudoir', and working and living areas for the senior house servants.

- 1920 – The Miller-Mundy family buy the estate, having moved from their estate at Shipley Park, Derbyshire. Two houses may have been built by architect Leonard Stokes Drysdale & Aylwin, and builders F Beale & Sons. Alfred Edward Miller-Mundy, who had originally been buried at Shipley Hall, was exhumed two years later to be moved with the family to Red Rice House when they sold the estate. It is not clear which members of the family moved to Red Rice. They may have included Alfred's widow (his second wife, Catherine Louisa Cradock-Hartopp); and his unmarried daughter Esme Sybil. Certainly Alfred's only son, Major Godfrey Edward Miller Mundy, the inheritor, moved there with his first wife Mollie and children (Edward) Peter Godfrey, and Maureen Angela. They were attracted by the agricultural and sporting potential of Red Rice. They set about building up the shoot and the estate to a record production of livestock and pheasants, in improving the grounds with, among other things, four tennis courts and a romantic, conveniently secluded Japanese style water-garden, and trees. The water garden contained a ginkgo tree and a great thicket of bamboo.
- 1921 – Two lodges (or gatehouses), gate piers and gates are built. Each lodge has a stone with the date (1921) and the Miller Mundy family crest.
- 1933 – Major restoration work is undertaken. The cost was 50,000 UKP.
- 1933 – A nursery wing was built onto the main house, to link up with the stables and probably providing additional living areas for servants.
- 1935 – Alfred's widow dies. The estate had already passed to the already married, eldest son, Major Godfrey Edward.
- 1937 – A local story relates how Peter Miller Mundy, at his 21st birthday party, turned fire-hoses on his guests, and released and shot a pheasant in the Great Hall (where the chapel is now).

=== The war years ===
- 1939/1945. The house had been taken over in the Second World War as a planning centre, mainly used by the American army; it was visited by the Supreme Commander, U.S. General Dwight D. Eisenhower, and it is part of local folklore that the bomb which destroyed the pub in Goodworth Clatford was aimed at him. Members of the Women's Land Army worked in the farm on the estate.
- 1939. Early in September, eight of the rooms were filled with specimens of butterflies, birds, mammals, etc., which were sent there for safekeeping by the British Museum.
- 1940. In the spring, Red Rice became the centre of a bomb disposal unit.
- 1940. In the summer, the House was occupied by Women's Auxiliary Air Force personnel from RAF Middle Wallop, which had opened that year.
- 1941. Major Peter marries for the first time; to Margaret. Their first son, Edward Simon Peter Mundy was born in November.
- 1941. A liaison unit of the United States Army Air Force was installed, and the entrance hall and the present library were divided by partitions into a number of small offices. Meanwhile, most of the furniture and pictures had been put into store, except for the contents of the main suite (later to be Sherwin and Bryant dormitories) and the library (now the Masters' Common Room), which were used by Major Miller-Mundy throughout. Outside, owing to war-time conditions, maintenance had been reduced to a minimum and the grounds had become very overgrown.
- 1943. Major Geoffrey Edward marries Julia Dorothea "Ullu" Brodnitz.
- 1944. Major Edward Peter has a son, Andrew Godfrey Miller Mundy; who was brought up on the estate.
- 1944. Red Rice was transformed into an American VIP centre. In one week the internal partitions were removed, damage was made good, the floors were sanded and polished. Many vans arrived bringing back the furniture, pictures and carpets. Rooms were redecorated, the grounds were tidied up, and in general the house was restored, at the request of the U.S. army authorities, to its pre-war splendour. The depleted Redrice staff, supplemented by large numbers of American troops both inside and outside, worked to meet a tight schedule. In addition to the work of restoration various other changes took place. Three or four direct telephone links between Redrice and Washington were installed, and the Servants' Hall became a telephone exchange. One room - probably the Major's 'Studio' room - was used as the map room, in which the plans for D-Day were recorded with coloured flags, as was later the progress of the troops after the invasion of France. It was during this period that General Eisenhower paid his two short visits to Red Rice, sleeping in the suite of rooms (later to become the infirmary and Matron's room in Redrice School). His leisure hours were spent fishing in the River Anton at Upper Clatford.
- 1944. Royal Air Force Substitution Unit: IX Fighter Command. Formed at Red Rice House, Andover (UK) in February.
- 1944. In August, a conference was held at Red Rice, attended by Secretary Henry Morgenthau Jr. and the UK War Cabinet Minister Brendan Bracken. It was to discuss the Morgenthau Plan, the 'Treasury Plan for the Treatment of Germany'. The plan was ratified by Churchill and Eisenhower three weeks later in Canada. However, the Morgenthau Plan eventually lost out to the philosophy of the Marshall Plan of 1947.
- 1945. The Army attempted to return the house to civilian use in good order after the war. The interior was painted the colour of weak tea on all walls, doorways, window-frames and the plasterwork on the ceilings.

=== After the war ===
- 1948. After the war, Major Edward Peter Godfrey Miller Mundy (July 1916, d. 27 July 1981) made a gift of a plot of land at the top of the village to be used as a council house estate and a sports field, and perhaps 5 acres situated between Goodworth and Upper Clatford to the Parish Council for use. A photograph exists of the Andover Ladies football team, pictured at a "Soldiers, Sailors, Airmen and Families Association" fete in Red Rice Park.
- 1949. Major Godfrey Edward dies and Major Edward Peter has a son, Mark Mundy.
- 1952 Following a divorce, Major Edward Peter marries for the second time, to Bridget Eileen Suzanne Smiley. He continued to live at Red Rice until 1961, but his 2nd wife was no longer living at Red Rice in 1961.
- 1953. Major Edward Peter Miller-Mundy inherits the 5,000-acre estate and a Georgian house in perfect order. He also inherited the estate manager, Mr F.L. "Nick" Jones, who had joined the household in 1921.
- 1957. An article in Sport & Country Magazine on 20 February 1957 gave an account of the origins of Red Rice. This version was generally accepted in the locality in 1961, but contains some legends since disproved.
- 1961. Major Edward Peter Miller-Mundy sells part of the Redrice Estate for 300,000 UKP to Sir Richard Boughey. The land sold was the middle part of the Red Rice estate extending to approximately 1800 acres.

With the departure in 1961 of Major Miller Mundy, the main entity of Redrice was divided into two main parts, the house and immediate grounds, and Home Farm.

=== Redrice School ===
The H-shaped estate workshop buildings and most of the stable block perimeter wall were removed. The stable yard was reconstructed to provide three classrooms and two day-rooms, together with changing rooms, ablutions and a housemaster's study below, and upstairs dormitories for 28 and studies for 30, as well as bathrooms and three master's rooms. The courtyard was floored with paving and chippings. A refectory area was created and roofed in over the old backyard of the house, between the kitchen and the house's 1933 wing. Trees were cleared for playing fields.

- 1960. A sale was advertised in the pages of The Times where it was spotted by Veronica Stokes, wife of a future Headmaster at Redrice School. The eastern portion of his 5,000 acre estate would become the School, consisting of the main house and stable block with its clock tower, plus the two lodges at the gate and 46 surrounding acres. On 17 February, at an auction at the Star and Garter Hotel in Andover, it was purchased by its consortium of new owners for 41,100 UKP plus the sixpenny stamp for Stamp Duty.
- 1961. Redrice School opened. Parts were adapted to school use and new buildings were built behind the house. The park had shrunk in size and the arboretum had suffered from neglect.
- 1962. The stable yard was developed and trees were removed from the grounds.
- 1965. Former U.S. President Dwight D. Eisenhower gave the school a signed photograph when he visited the UK in memory of Red Rice's contribution during the war.
- 1981. The house and grounds were used in the filming of Codename Icarus, a BBC TV series in 1981 (the whole series is on YouTube).
- 1988. The music group, The Troggs played in the grounds at a Summer Musical event at Farleigh School

=== Recent history ===
- 1968 (approximate date) The Scotts invited the Andover and District Model Engineering Society (ADMES)to have their main base in the Market Garden of Red Rice. This enabled the society to build a raised model railway track, a turntable, sidings, and many other miniature railway facilities. The Society remained there until 2003 when Mr & Mrs Scott sold the land.

After 1982, several new buildings have been added for Farleigh School.

- 1982. Occupied by Farleigh School.
- 1967. Part of the Home Farm land was used in the filming of "No Hiding Place" an Independent Television production.
- 1976. On the Home Farm estate land at Dipden Bottom, was turned into a giant map of Great Britain for the BBC Wildlife Production of "Spectacular Britain". David Attenborough spent many days being filmed as he walked round the map to introduce the location of unusual wildlife.
- 1977. An underwater film set was built on the land inside the market garden for the filming of "Tarka The Otter". Edward Scott and his son Philip both worked for the production. Philip was a set decorator for the production, and in particular the underwater scene at Red Rice.

=== Paintings and photographs ===
Until the House became a School in 1961, the House contained many portraits. In 1893, a local history society reported there was a portrait of General Pitt in Thomas Best's house. When Eisenhower visited during the war, it was noted that the mansion was "hung with ancient paintings".

A photograph of the Great Hall (now a Chapel) in 1945 shows the original "Cupid & Psyche" by John Hoppner hanging with many other paintings.

In 1960, purchasers saw many family portraits and engravings of ladies, which were not part of the sale; and taken by the vendor; and some were sold by Auction at Christies. In the 1920s the sale of the property is believed to have included a printed prospectus which included photographs. The earliest known existing photograph is an aerial photograph; probably taken between 1933 and 1960.

== Home Farm ==
On 28 April 1961, the farming side of the hamlet (approximately 850 acres) was purchased by the Scott family. This was farmed with their relatives the Barnes-Gorell family.

This included the parkland to the south east of the main house, 16 farm workers' cottages, the market garden, farm buildings, outlying barns and woodland. Over the years, the houses were improved and modernized. Several were knocked into larger accommodation to increase the quality of the homes. The farm infrastructure was improved and in 1967 the dairy herd was sold and the output switched solely to arable crops. Unusually the farm retained extensive soil, climate and other key data from every growing season. This enabled it to be competitive by specializing in growing seed crops for the major seed producers.

Before the First World War, the farm employed 40 men and about 80 horses. There were required for all aspects of the farming process. The introduction of traction engines did little to reduce their numbers. When they were being used, up to 8 horses were required to pull the water bowsers from the Pill Hill Brook, a tributary of the River Anton that runs through the Clatfords, to Red Rice to keep their boilers supplied. The introduction of modern tractors reduced the number of horses required.

In 1963, the Scott family built their family home in the Horse Meadow field. It was aptly named Horse Meadow. Mary Scott was an internationally acclaimed sculptor, whose work includes the plaque commemorating the battle of Gallipoli during the First World War which is found in the Crypt of St Paul's Cathedral, London. Her husband, Edward Scott was part of the small photographic unit that recorded the devastation from Britain's atomic weapons test in Montebello in 1952.

The family sold the majority of the farmland and Home Farm in 2004, and retained their home, a cottage and surrounding lands of 40 acres around the family home, and a small paddock and 18 acres of woodland to the south of Redrice House called Home Covert.

== Legends and associated stories ==
A local legend about the avenue tells of a ghostly coach and horses on the road between Red Rice and Abbotts Ann. This is almost certainly a reference to a Roman mosaic unearthed in the nearby field by "Squire" Errington, depicting a "coach and a pair of galloping horses". In the house itself, one boy who used to practise on the chapel organ was sure he had seen a 'Grey Lady' walking up the aisle. Two of the school staff, accommodated in the upper floor of the stable courtyard, (previously occupied by grooms and domestic servants of the estate), told of overwhelming feelings of terror at night experienced in one particular corner. Two stories could account for this. One tells of a drunken fight between two grooms, which ended with one of them killed by a fall down a steep staircase. The second relates to the attempted murder by shooting in 1846, as mentioned above in the section on the Best family.

== Popular culture ==
Eliza Carthy named her 1998 Mercury Music Prize nominated album Red Rice after travelling in the area.
