= Codename Icarus =

British children's television serial

Cover of the BBC/Knight Books novelisation of the serial.

Codename Icarus is a five-part British children's television drama serial written by Richard Cooper, which was produced by the BBC in 1981.

The serial combined elements of teenage drama and conspiracy thriller, and involved child prodigies being manipulated as the basis for a complex scheme involving nuclear missiles and the mysterious Icarus Foundation's plot to take over the world.

It starred Barry Angel as child prodigy Martin Smith and Philip Locke as John Doll. Cooper also novelised the serial, which was published by the BBC and Knight Books in 1981.

The serial was released on VHS in compilation form by BBC Video in 1985 in the UK, and in 2006 it was made available in its original, unedited episodic format on Region 1 DVD by Home Vision Entertainment in the United States.

The location for the scenes when the children were at school was the Redrice, just outside Andover, Hampshire, UK. This school has since been renamed as the Farleigh School. All the child extras came from the Harrow Way Community School in Andover.

The credits for all five episodes of the serial bore the captions 'Scientific Advice – Professor John Taylor' and 'BBC wishes to thank: Imperial War Museum, Duxford'.

The title music was Koschei's Infernal Dance from The Firebird by Igor Stravinsky.

Episode 3 'Harlequin' was nominated for 'Best Drama/Light Entertainment' at the 1982 BAFTA Awards.

The serial was broadcast twice-weekly, on Tuesdays and Wednesdays, with the original transmission dates being as follows:

- Part One – 8 December 1981
- Part Two – 9 December 1981
- Part Three – 15 December 1981
- Part Four – 16 December 1981
- Part Five – 22 December 1981

== In other media ==
=== Novelisation ===
Publisher: BBC/Knight Books
Year: 1981
Author: Richard Cooper
Original Price: £1.25
ISBN №: 0-340-27535-9
Availability: Out of print

The novelisation was published to tie-in with the broadcast of the serial. The book's content is fairly faithful to the televised version, although Richard Cooper has rearranged some scenes and added some extra material not seen on-screen, as well as omitting the character of Frank Broadhurst (played on-screen by Gorden Kaye) entirely. The front cover featured a specially posed publicity photograph by Chris Ridley showing Barry Angel as Martin Smith holding a pair of binoculars, with Philip Locke as John Doll standing in the background.

=== VHS ===
Label: BBC Video
Release Date: 1985
Catalogue №: BBCV 9023
Availability: Deleted

Presented as a 106-minute compilation. BBFC "U" certificate. The opening titles of Part One were edited to remove the episode number caption. The opening titles were missing from Parts Two, Three, Four and Five. The closing titles were missing from Parts One, Two, Three and Four, with a compilation version of the closing credits – i.e. featuring the cast and production crew of the entire serial – at the end of Part Five. The compilation is also strangely missing some scenes that are present in the episodic version of the serial available on Region 1 DVD in the United States, but why these cuts were made (bearing in mind that the omitted sequences are hardly offensive) remains unclear. The BBC Video presentation was by Katrina Murray.

=== DVD ===
Label: Home Vision Entertainment
Release Date: 24 January 2006
Catalogue №: HVE2964DVD
Availability: Out now

DVD Features

- Digitally restored versions of all episodes
- Trailer for The Chronicles of Narnia
- Captions for the hearing-impaired

Presented in original, unedited episodic format, with a running time of 146 minutes. MPAA Unrated.

To date, Codename Icarus has only been released on Region 1 DVD in the United States. There are currently no plans for a Region 2 release for the UK.
