= Askwith (surname) =

Askwith is a surname, and may refer to:

- Betty Askwith (1909–1995), English writer
- George Askwith, 1st Baron Askwith (1861–1942), English lawyer, civil servant and industrial arbitrator
- Mark Askwith (born 1956), Canadian producer and writer
- Richard Askwith, British journalist and author
- Robert Askwith (1567–1623), Member of the Parliament of England
- Robin Askwith (born 1950), English film actor
- Tom Askwith (1911–2001), British Olympic rower and colonial administrator in Kenya
- Wilfred Askwith (1890–1962), English Anglican bishop
- William Askwith (1843–1911). Archdeacon of Taunton

== See also ==
- Asquith (surname)
