= Baron Russell of Killowen =

Baron Russell of Killowen can refer to three law lords, father, son and grandson:

- Charles Russell, Baron Russell of Killowen (1832–1900), Lord Chief Justice of England and Wales and father of Frank Russell
- Frank Russell, Baron Russell of Killowen (1867–1946), Lord of Appeal in Ordinary and father of Charles Ritchie Russell
- Charles Ritchie Russell, Baron Russell of Killowen (1908–1986), Lord of Appeal in Ordinary
