= Farleigh School =

Location
- Red Rice; Andover, Hampshire, SP11 7PW; England; 51.174°N 1.51572°W

Information
- Type: Preparatory day and boarding
- Religious affiliation: Roman Catholic
- Established: 1953
- Local authority: Hampshire
- Department for Education URN: 116542 Tables
- Head teacher: Simon Everson
- Gender: Coeducational
- Age: 2 to 13
- Enrolment: 430
- Houses: Buzzards; Eagles; Kestrels; Merlins
- Colours: Blue and Yellow
- Website: www.farleighschool.com

Farleigh School is a Catholic preparatory day and boarding school in Andover, Hampshire, England. Situated in 60 acres (240,000 m^{2}) of parkland in the Test Valley, Hampshire, it educates around 430 children. The current school comprises a pre-prep department (ages 2-7) and the main prep school (ages 7-13). The nursery at Farleigh opened in September 2026 and takes children from two years of age on a full time and flexible provision. The school plans to open for children of 9 months from Spring 2027.

== History ==
Farleigh was founded as a boys' boarding school in 1953 at Farleigh House, near Basingstoke, Hampshire, the seat of the earls of Portsmouth, by the late Jocelyn Francis Trappes-Lomax. It started out with 35 boys.

Since moving to Red Rice in 1982, the school has acquired an indoor swimming pool, a new art and DT facility, and a new headmaster. Father Simon Everson, in addition to his duties as headmaster at Farleigh School, also takes responsibility as chaplain at the school.

Since 1982 it has been located in a Georgian country house previously named Red Rice House, where the future George IV of the United Kingdom (then still Prince of Wales) was believed to have secretly – and illegally – married the Roman Catholic Maria Anne Fitzherbert in 1785. The legend was disproved in 1905 when Mrs Fitzherbert's papers were made public. The house is situated in the hamlet Red Rice, near Andover, Hampshire.

== Boarding ==
Boarding is available to both boys and girls aged 7 (Year 3) and above. Around 35% of prep school pupils board either full-time or on weekdays. The younger boarders are housed separate sections of the Junior House. Boarders in Year 7 and above reside in two senior houses (1 for boys and 1 for girls).

== Notable alumni ==
- Rupert Allason
- Raymond Asquith, 3rd Earl of Oxford and Asquith
- Cressida Bonas
- Rupert Everett
- Francis Fitzherbert, 15th Baron Stafford
- Tarka L'Herpiniere
- Alexander Hesketh, 3rd Baron Hesketh
- Earl Jellicoe (which one?)
- John Home Robertson
- Will Stuart, rugby union player
- Hugh Vyvyan

== Former staff ==
The former Hampshire cricketer and Crystal Palace and Southampton footballer, Bernard Harrison, was for many years a teacher of Mathematics and Sports at the school.
