= Raymond Asquith, 3rd Earl of Oxford and Asquith =

British diplomat, intelligence officer, businessman and peer

The Right Honourable The Earl of Oxford and Asquith OBE

Member of the House of Lords
- Lord Temporal
- Elected Hereditary Peer; 24 October 2014 – 29 April 2026
- By-election: 2014
- Preceded by: The 7th Baron Methuen
- Succeeded by: Seat abolished

Personal details
- Born: Raymond Benedict Bartholomew Michael Asquith; 24 August 1952 (age 73) Libya
- Party: Liberal Democrats
- Spouse: Clare Pollen (m. 1978)
- Children: 5
- Parent(s): Julian Asquith, 2nd Earl of Oxford and Asquith; Anne Palairet
- Relatives: Asquith family Bonham Carter family
- Education: Ampleforth College; Farleigh School
- Alma mater: Balliol College, Oxford
- Occupation: Politician, diplomat

Raymond Benedict Bartholomew Michael Asquith, 3rd Earl of Oxford and Asquith OBE (born 24 August 1952) is a British former diplomat and hereditary peer, styled Viscount Asquith until he succeeded to his father's peerage titles on 16 January 2011. The earldom of Oxford and Asquith was created for his paternal great-grandfather, H. H. Asquith, a former prime minister of the United Kingdom.

== Early life ==
Lord Oxford (as he is now known) is the elder son of Julian Asquith, 2nd Earl of Oxford and Asquith, and code breaker Anne Asquith. He was named after his paternal grandfather Raymond Asquith, a scholar and Army officer who was killed in action during the First World War. He was born in Libya, where his father was posted in 1952. His father also had postings to Zanzibar, the West Indies, and the Seychelles. He was sent to school in England when he was nine years old.

He was educated at Farleigh School and Ampleforth College, and obtained a BA and subsequent MA degree at Balliol College, Oxford.

== Career ==
Raymond Asquith applied to join HM Diplomatic Service as a career diplomat in 1978 but was offered a job in the Secret Intelligence Service instead in 1980. As well as postings in London at the Foreign and Commonwealth Office and to the Cabinet Office, he served as First Secretary at the British Embassy in Moscow from 1983 to 1985, and Counsellor at HM Embassy in Kyiv from 1992 to 1997. He was First Secretary (Political) and MI6 station commander in Moscow and was responsible personally for exfiltrating the KGB officer and British agent Oleg Gordievsky concealed in his car, an action which resulted in the expulsion from the USSR of himself and 17 Embassy colleagues plus 7 British businessmen in September 1985.

Asquith was appointed an Officer of the Order of the British Empire for "diplomatic services" in 1992. Other family members who served as British diplomats include his father, his brother Sir Dominic Asquith (former British Ambassador to Iraq and Egypt), and his maternal grandfather Sir Michael Palairet.

He is currently a director of Group DF, the Ukrainian holding company of Dmytro Firtash, a Ukrainian oligarch associated with Vladimir Putin and Viktor Yanukovych, who is also accused by the United States Justice Department of involvement with Russian organised crime. Prior to succeeding to his peerage, Asquith managed the lobbying company Asquith & Granovski, which served affluent clients from post-Soviet states, including Firtash.

In October 2014, the Earl of Oxford and Asquith was elected in the House of Lords by-election to replace the Lord Methuen (who died in July 2014) and to sit as a Liberal Democrat, alongside his cousin the Baroness Bonham-Carter of Yarnbury on the government benches (as the Lib Dems were then part of a coalition government) in the House of Lords. He left the Liberal Democrats in 2019, and since 2021 sat as a crossbencher.

== Personal life ==
In 1978, Asquith married the author and scholar Clare Pollen. The Earl and Countess of Oxford and Asquith have a son and four daughters.

- Mark Julian Asquith, Viscount Asquith (born 13 May 1979), heir apparent
- Lady Magdalen Katharine Asquith (born 30 December 1981)
- Lady Frances Sophia Asquith (born 1984)
- Lady Celia Rose Asquith (born 1989)
- Lady Isabel Anne Asquith (born 1991)

The senior branch of the Asquith family has been Roman Catholic since Katharine Asquith (mother of the 2nd Earl) converted after the death of her husband. Lord Oxford's mother was also a Catholic, as is his wife.

== Arms ==
Coat of arms of Earls of Oxford and Asquith
Crest Issuant out of clouds proper, a mascle gules. Escutcheon Sable, on a fesse between three cross-crosslets argent a portcullis of the field. Supporters On either side a lion purpure, charged on the shoulder with an open book argent, edged or. Motto Sine macula macla (Stained without stain).

Peerage of the United Kingdom
Preceded by Julian Asquith	Earl of Oxford and Asquith; 2011–present	Incumbent; Heir apparent: Mark Asquith, Viscount Asquith
Parliament of the United Kingdom
Preceded by The Lord Methuen	Elected hereditary peer to the House of Lords under the House of Lords Act 1999; 2014–2026	Position abolished under the House of Lords (Hereditary Peers) Act 2026
Orders of precedence in the United Kingdom
Preceded by The Earl of Balfour	Peers	Succeeded by The Earl Jellicoe
