= Dominic Asquith =

British diplomat (born 1957)

The Honourable Sir Dominic Asquith KCMG
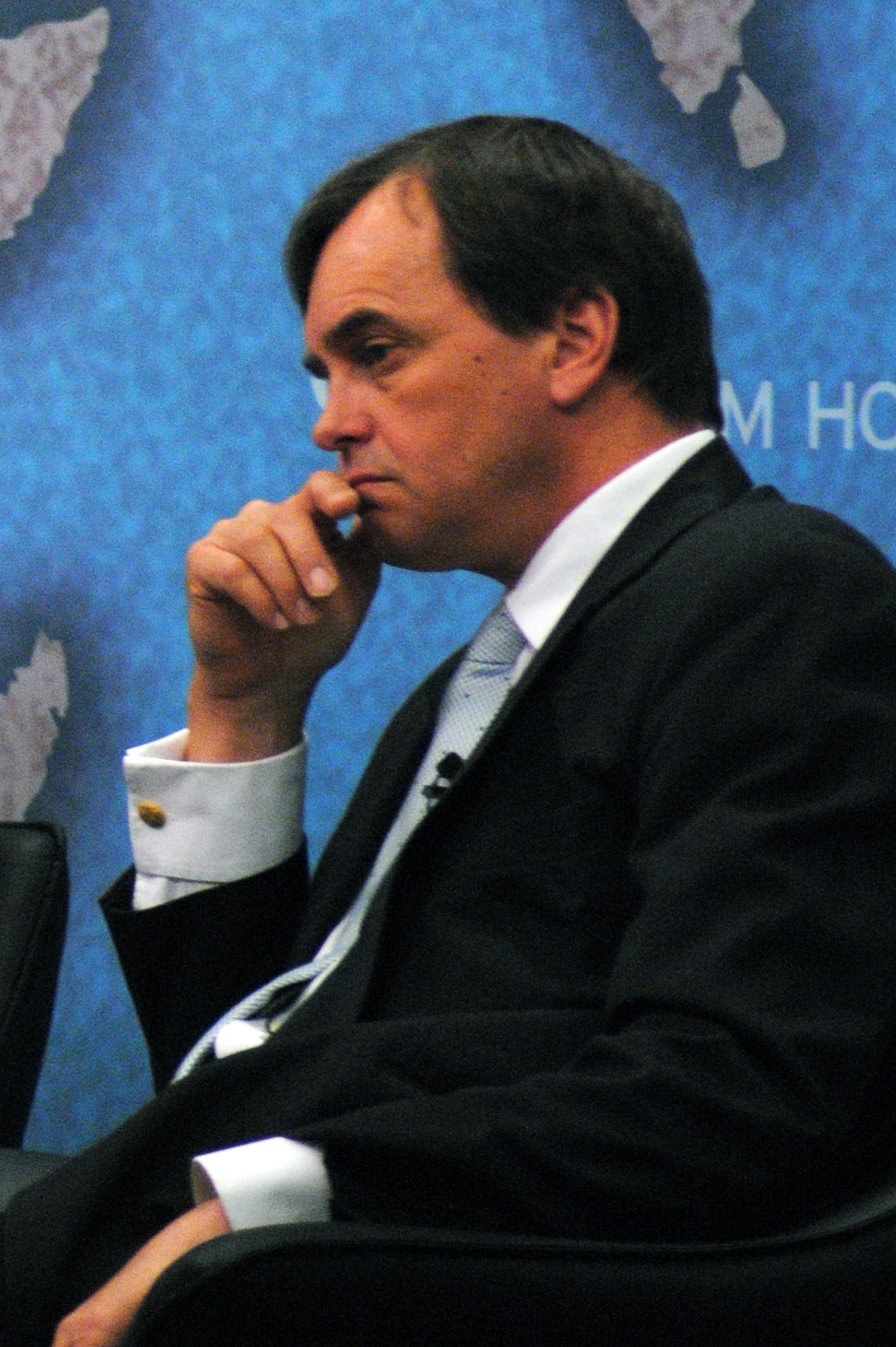
- Asquith at Chatham House in 2013

British High Commissioner to India
- In office April 2016 – January 2020
- Monarch: Elizabeth II
- Prime Minister: Theresa May; Boris Johnson
- Preceded by: Sir James Bevan
- Succeeded by: Sir Philip Barton

British Ambassador to Libya
- In office 2011–2012
- Monarch: Elizabeth II
- Prime Minister: David Cameron
- Preceded by: Sir John Jenkins
- Succeeded by: Michael Aron

British Ambassador to Egypt
- In office 2007–2011
- Monarch: Elizabeth II
- Prime Minister: Tony Blair; Gordon Brown; David Cameron
- Preceded by: Sir Derek Plumbly
- Succeeded by: James Watt

British Ambassador to Iraq
- In office 2006–2007
- Monarch: Elizabeth II
- Prime Minister: Tony Blair
- Preceded by: William Patey
- Succeeded by: Christopher Prentice

Personal details
- Born: 7 February 1957 (age 69)
- Spouse: Louise Cotton (m. 1988)
- Children: 4
- Parents: Julian Asquith, 2nd Earl of Oxford and Asquith (father); Anne Asquith (mother)
- Relatives: Raymond Asquith, 3rd Earl of Oxford and Asquith (brother); Sir Michael Palairet (grandfather); H. H. Asquith (great-grandfather)
- Education: Ampleforth College

Sir Dominic Anthony Gerard Asquith KCMG (born 7 February 1957) is a British career diplomat and former Ambassador to Iraq, Egypt, and Libya. He was First Secretary at the British Embassy in Washington DC. He was most recently the British High Commissioner to the Republic of India.

== Background and education ==
Asquith is the younger son of The 2nd Earl of Oxford and Asquith and Anne (born Palairet). He is a great-grandson of H. H. Asquith, the former British Prime Minister. Asquith's elder brother Raymond, father Lord Oxford, and maternal grandfather Sir Michael Palairet, all served as British diplomats. Like his father and brother, he was educated at Ampleforth College.

In 1975 he was involved in the Musa Alami project in the West Bank, Palestine, and worked as a researcher at the Institute of Palestine Studies in Beirut.

In 1981 he worked as a freelance journalist in Amman, Jordan and then as the Executive Secretary to the Parliamentary Association for Euro-Arab Co-operation in London, until 1983.

== Diplomatic career ==
Asquith joined HM Diplomatic Service in 1983 as part of the Soviet department and served at Damascus, Muscat, Washington, D.C., Buenos Aires and Riyadh before being appointed Deputy Head of Mission in Iraq in 2004, Director of the Iraq Directorate at the Foreign and Commonwealth Office 2004–06 and Ambassador to Iraq 2006–07. He was Ambassador to Egypt 2007–11 and Ambassador to Libya 2011–12.

On 4 December 2009, Asquith gave evidence before Parliament to The Iraq Inquiry.

Asquith survived an assassination attempt in June 2012 when a British convoy was hit by a rocket-propelled grenade. In September 2012 Asquith had to extend a routine break from Libya for medical treatment and in January 2013 he was officially replaced by Michael Aron.

Asquith was appointed a Companion of the Order of St Michael and St George in 2004, and knighted as a Knight Commander of the Order of St Michael and St George in the 2012 New Year Honours.

After spending a few years in the private sector, Asquith returned to diplomatic life, taking charge as High Commissioner to India in April 2016. He concluded his four-year stint in India in January 2020.

== Outside work ==
In May 2013 Asquith took an unpaid position leading a trade delegation to Libya organised by the Libyan British Business Council.

In June 2013 Sir Dominic took a paid position as senior consultant with Tatweer Research, a Libyan research and development company, specialising in technology and engineering.

== Career overview ==
- 1983–1984 Diplomat, Soviet Dept
- 1984–1985 Diplomat, Southern Europe Dept
- 1986–1987 Second Secretary, Damascus, Syria
- 1987–1989 First Secretary (Chancery), Muscat
- 1989–1990 Diplomat, EC Dept (Internal) Dept
- 1990–1992 Private Secretary to Minister of State FCO
- 1992–1996 First Secretary, Washington DC, USA
- 1996 Drugs and International Crime Dept FCO
- 1997–2001 Minister and Dep Head of Mission, Buenos Aires
- 2001–2004 Deputy Head of Mission and Consul-General, Riyadh, Saudi Arabia
- 2004 Deputy Special Representative for Iraq, and Deputy Head of Mission, Baghdad, Iraq
- 2004–2006 Director Iraq, FCO
- 2006–2007 HM Ambassador to Iraq
- 2007–2011 HM Ambassador to Egypt
- 2011–2012 UK Special Representative, then Ambassador, to Libya
- 2013–2015 Senior Advisor, Dentons LLP
- 2016–2020 British High Commissioner to India

== Personal life ==
Asquith was married in 1988 to Louise Cotton, who had worked as a secretary in the British Foreign Office and resigned upon her marriage. Sir Dominic and Lady Asquith have four children.

Diplomatic posts
Preceded by William Patey	British Ambassador to Iraq; 2006–2007	Succeeded by Christopher Prentice
Preceded by Sir Derek Plumbly	British Ambassador to Egypt; 2007–2011	Succeeded by James Watt
Preceded by Sir John Jenkins	British Ambassador to Libya; 2011–2012	Succeeded by Michael Aron
Preceded by Sir James Bevan	British High Commissioner to India; 2016–2020	Succeeded by Sir Philip Barton
