= Clare Asquith =

British academic and writer (born 1951)

The Right Honourable The Countess of Oxford and Asquith
- Born: Mary Clare Pollen; 2 June 1951 (age 74); United Kingdom
- Occupations: Independent scholar; author
- Known for: Shakespearean Research
- Notable work: Shadowplay: the Hidden Beliefs and Coded Politics of William Shakespeare

Mary Clare Asquith, Countess of Oxford and Asquith (née Pollen; 2 June 1951) is an English independent scholar and author of Shadowplay: the Hidden Beliefs and Coded Politics of William Shakespeare, in which she posited that Shakespeare was a covert Catholic, whose works contain coded language used by the Catholic underground, particularly England's Jesuits, but also appealed to the monarchy for toleration. Her book was the first to claim the existence of such a code as a subtext in Shakespeare.

== Works ==
Asquith's work was hailed by some, including the Catholic writer Piers Paul Read, as "dramatic, important" and "painstaking scholarship".

Her second book, Shakespeare and the Resistance: The Earl of Southampton, the Essex Rebellion, and the Poems that Challenged Tudor Tyranny, follows the same themes as her first, focusing on the poems Venus and Adonis and The Rape of Lucrece. This was reviewed favorably by Michael Thomas Barry in the New York Journal of Books, as "a must read for anyone interested in the study and interpretation of Shakespearian era politics or literary criticism," but unfavorably by James Shapiro in the New York Review of Books: "Asquith blithely ignores every fact that might qualify or undermine her claims. And because she prosecutes her case so skillfully, there's no way for general readers to distinguish solid arguments from fantastic ones."

Asquith has lectured on Shakespeare in the UK and in North America. Her ideas on the 16th-century code were first raised while observing coded messages in Soviet dissident plays while her husband served as a diplomat in Moscow during the Cold War, and were first published in The Shakespeare Newsletter and The Times Literary Supplement.

== Personal life ==
Lady Oxford was born Mary Clare Pollen, as the eldest of the five children of the architect Francis Pollen and Marie Therese Sheridan (later Viscountess Sidmouth, wife of the 7th peer). She lives in Somerset with her husband, the former diplomat Raymond Asquith, 3rd Earl of Oxford and Asquith, whom she married in 1978. They have five children.

== Selected works ==
- Shadowplay: The Hidden Beliefs and Coded Politics of William Shakespeare (Hachette Book Group, 2005)
- Shakespeare and the Resistance: The Earl of Southampton, the Essex Rebellion, and the Poems that Challenged Tudor Tyranny (Hachette Book Group, 2018)
