= Asquith Motors =

English commercial vehicle manufacturer

Asquith Motors is an English commercial vehicle manufacturer of hand built replicas since 1981 and originally based in Braintree, Essex. The company was founded by Bruce West, who designed the logo, created the name and designed all the early vehicles. His concept was to create modern vehicles with the potential of mass advertising through the appeal of historic vehicles. In 1984, West sold the moulds to Hunnable Holdings of Yeldham, Great Yeldham, Essex.

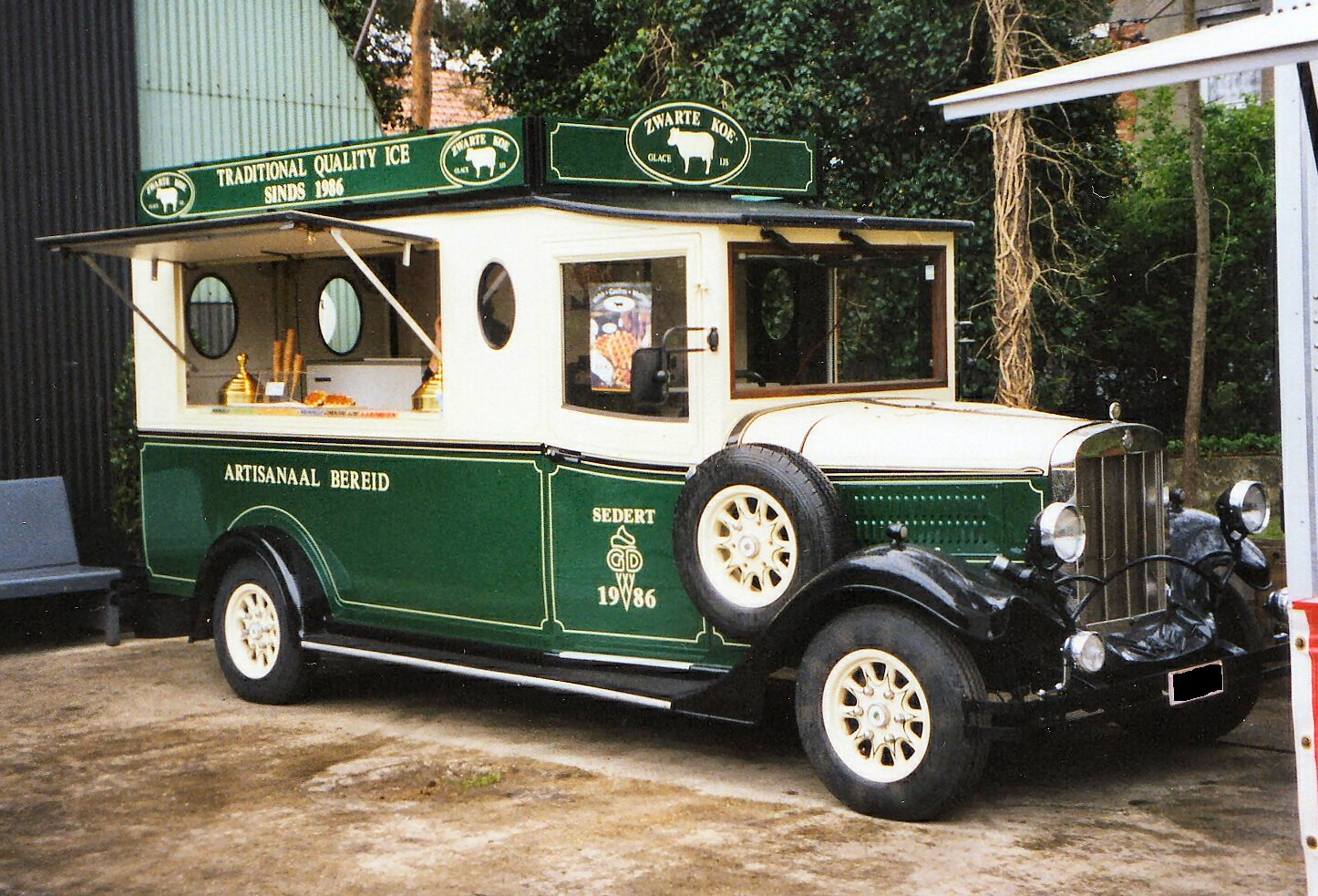
Asquith "Vintage" Van used as ice-cream selling facility at the Stoomfestival (Steam festival) in Stoomcentrum Maldegem, a heritage railway in Belgium, in the town of Maldegem

Mr West started building "retro-style" delivery vans on the Ford Transit chassis in 1982. In 1991, the company announced production of a 1930s-style taxi cab that would meet the London Public Carriage Office regulations on a purpose-built chassis.

Originally based in Braintree in Essex, Asquith employed 30 full-time craftsmen who handmade over 1,000 vehicles, many exported to countries as far away as Paraguay, Japan and USA, though Germany has always been the biggest export market.

In the late 1990s after the sale to Hunnables, the company experienced some challenges. The cost of manufacture had increased, research and development on new vehicles including the London Taxi had spiralled and a large Japanese order was cancelled due to increases in the exchange rate. The company was forced into receivership.

The company was purchased from the liquidators by Mike Edgar in 1997. He built a team of designers led by Paul Keegan and engineers led by Eddie Parsons. Further investment was required to move the company forward and Edgar soon found that UK manufacture was too expensive and sought partnerships in other countries. At the time, relationships were established with third-party companies in Barcelona (Spain) and Katowice (Poland).

In 2003, the molds and intellectual property rights were purchased by Simon Rhodes and Asquith Motors was established to develop new versions of the original vehicles. Due to various quality, language and distance issues with the overseas companies, it was decided to stop them manufacturing further vehicles.

In 2005, Asquith Motors bought the assets of the 'Vintage Motor Company Ltd', based in Doncaster. The main assets included The Royale Windsor (a 1940s-style limousine) and The Royale Sabre (a 1940s-style sports car). These are due to manufactured in the future. In 2009, Asquith Motors appointed John Barlow, a well known and respected car designer and engineer, to develop new moulds for the Shire and Mascot, to be based on the Iveco Daily chassis. Launch of these vehicles was due in early 2010 and enquiries had been received from companies all over the world, who appreciated the classic style to advertise their business. No such model was ever produced though.

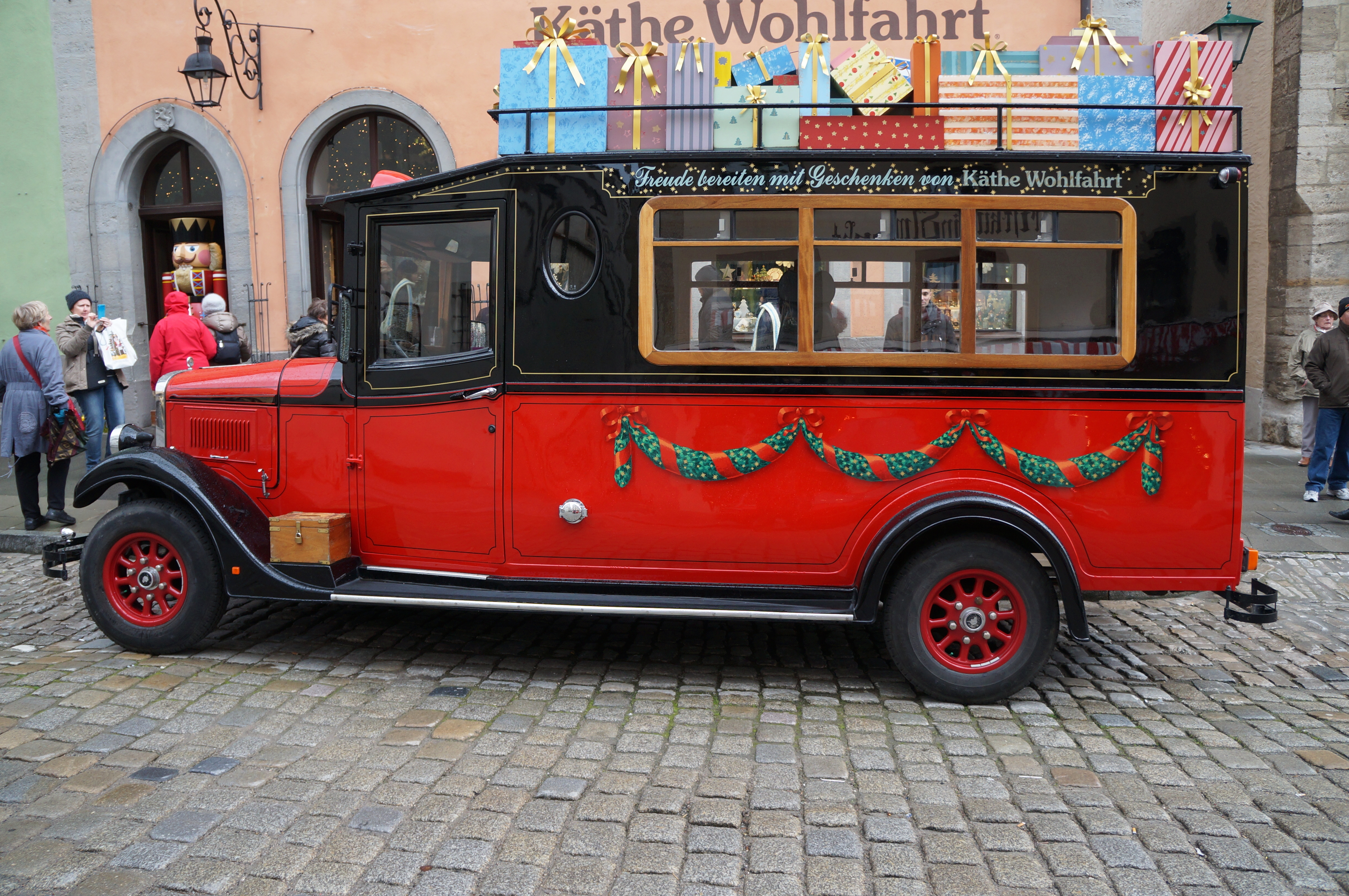
Asquith "Vintage" Van Oldtimer used by business "Käthe Wohlfahrt, in Rothenburg ob der Tauber

As of September 2020, the website claims to have three new products in development; The Mascot eight seater bus, the smaller Shetland electric van and numerous vintage style trailers. No official launch date is set, and there have been no further updates since, although the company still appears to be active.
