= Julian Asquith, 2nd Earl of Oxford and Asquith =

British colonial administrator

The Right Honourable The Earl of Oxford and Asquith KCMG
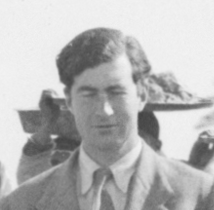
- Julian Asquith, at Hamama, in 1943

Governor of the Seychelles
- In office August 1962 – February 1967
- Monarch: Elizabeth II
- Preceded by: John Kingsmill Thorp
- Succeeded by: Sir Hugh Norman-Walker

Member of the House of Lords
- Lord Temporal
- Hereditary peerage 22 April 1937 – 11 November 1999
- Preceded by: The 1st Earl of Oxford and Asquith
- Succeeded by: Seat abolished The 3rd Earl of Oxford and Asquith (2014)

Personal details
- Born: 22 April 1916
- Died: 16 January 2011 (aged 94)
- Party: Crossbench
- Spouse: Anne Palairet (m. 1947; died 1998)
- Parents: Raymond Asquith (father); Katharine Horner (mother)
- Relatives: H. H. Asquith (grandfather)
- Education: Ampleforth College
- Alma mater: Balliol College, Oxford

Julian Edward George Asquith, 2nd Earl of Oxford and Asquith, KCMG (22 April 1916 – 16 January 2011) was a British colonial administrator and hereditary peer.

== Background and education ==
Asquith was the only son of Katharine (née Horner) and Raymond Asquith, a barrister. He was the grandson of H. H. Asquith, 1st Earl of Oxford and Asquith, British Prime Minister from 1908 until 1916. Lord Oxford's two older sisters both predeceased him; the younger of these was Lady Perdita Rose Mary Asquith, later Lady Hylton (1910–1996), who was married to William Jolliffe, 4th Baron Hylton and became the grandmother of the actress Anna Chancellor.

He inherited the earldom in 1928 on the death of his grandfather, since his father had been killed in the First World War. He was raised as a Roman Catholic after his mother's conversion to Catholicism in 1923. He was educated at St Ronan's School and Ampleforth College, going on to study at Balliol College, Oxford, where he graduated with Bachelor of Arts and Master of Arts degrees. In 1936, he attended the opening of the new building of Campion Hall, a Catholic institution within the University, with the Duke of Alba, Spanish ambassador to London, and Alban Goodier S.J., the former Archbishop of Bombay. As Earl of Oxford and Asquith, he attended the coronation of George VI and Elizabeth and paid homage to the new monarch alongside other earls.

== Career ==
=== War service ===
Having attend the 141st Officer Cadet Training Unit, Asquith was commissioned as a second lieutenant in the Royal Engineers, British Army. He served with 3 Field Squadron in Egypt. He served the during the fall of Greece, which resulted in his armoured brigade loosing all its equipment in the retreat. He then served on the staff of Major General Edward Spears in the Levant, while Spears was acting as Winston Churchill's personal representative to the Free French and Charles de Gaulle. He returned to his unite and was posted to Safad, Palestine, where he learnt Arabic.

While serving in the British Army in Palestine, Sir John Macpherson, the chief secretary of the British Mandate of Palestine, invited him to join the Colonial Service. From 1942 to 1948, he was an assistant district commissioner in Palestine.

Asquith resigned his commission on 6 January 1954, and was allowed to the retain the honorary rank of lieutenant.

=== Colonial service ===
After the war, Lord Oxford pursued a career in the Colonial Service. He was Deputy chairman Secretary of the British Administration Tripolitania from 1949 to 1950, Director of Interior Tripolitania in 1951 and Advisor to the Prime Minister of Libya in 1952. In 1955 he was Administrative Secretary of Zanzibar and from 1958 to 1962 was the Administrator of Saint Lucia. He was appointed Companion of the Order of St Michael and St George in 1961.

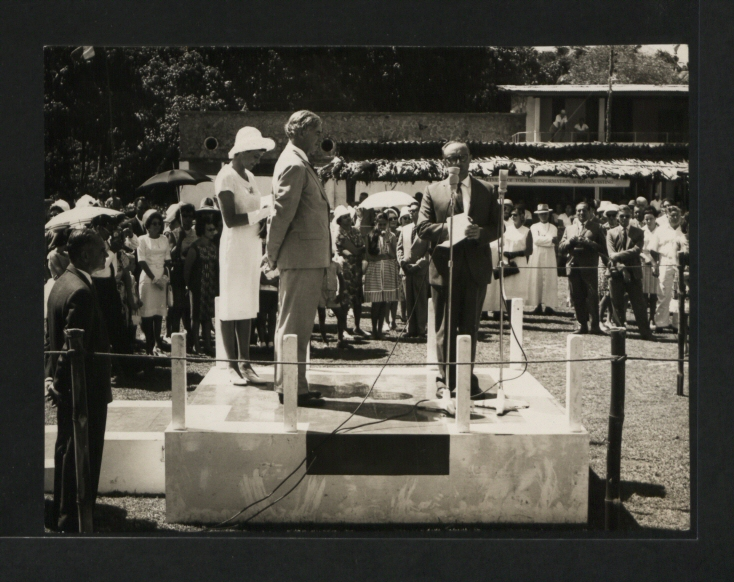
His Excellency the Governor and the Countess of Oxford at the opening of the first-ever Seychelles National Show, September 2nd 1966.

Oxford was the Governor and Commander-in-Chief of the Seychelles from 1962 to 1967, and the Commissioner of the British Indian Ocean Territory from 1965 to 1967. In 1964, he was advanced as Knight Commander of the Order of St Michael and St George. He also held the posts of Constitutional Commander of the Cayman Islands in 1971, and Turks and Caicos Islands from 1973 to 1974.

== Marriage and children ==
On 28 August 1947, Lord Oxford married Anne Mary Celestine Palairet, daughter of Mary de Vere Studd and Sir Michael Palairet (1882–1956) at the Brompton Oratory. Anne Oxford was also a Roman Catholic via her parents' conversions.

Lord and Lady Oxford had five children: three daughters (the second of which is married to a diplomat) and two sons, both diplomats:

- Lady (Mary) Annunziata Asquith (born 28 July 1948), partner of Patrick Anson, 5th Earl of Lichfield
- Lady Katharine Rose Celestine Asquith (born 1 October 1949), in 1970 married Adam Ridley, divorced 1976; married secondly 1985 Nathaniel Page, son of Sir John Page.
- Raymond Benedict Bartholomew Asquith, 3rd Earl of Oxford and Asquith (born 24 August 1952)
- Lady Clare Perpetua Frances Asquith (born 28 March 1955)
- Sir Dominic Antony Gerard Asquith KCMG (born 7 February 1957), a former British Ambassador to Iraq, Egypt and Libya.

Lord Oxford inherited the estate of Mells Manor from his mother Katharine Asquith, the younger daughter of Frances Jane (née Graham) and Sir John Francis Fortescue Horner.

The Countess of Oxford and Asquith died in 1998. The Earl died, aged 94, on 16 January 2011. He was succeeded in his peerage titles, which he had held for over 80 years, by his elder son, Raymond (b. 1952), a former British diplomat and elected hereditary member of the House of Lords.

== Arms ==
Coat of arms of Julian Asquith, 2nd Earl of Oxford and Asquith
Crest Issuant out of clouds proper, a mascle gules. Escutcheon Sable, on a fesse between three cross-crosslets argent a portcullis of the field. Supporters On either side a lion purpure, charged on the shoulder with an open book argent, edged or. Motto Sine macula macla (Stained without stain). Orders The Most Distinguished Order of St.Michael and St.George (Knight Commander - KCMG)

== Sources ==
- Who's Who 2007 "Oxford and Asquith, The Earl of" and "Asquith, Dominic"
- "Obituary: The Countess of Oxford and Asquith", Daily Telegraph, 1998.
- Joliffe, John (7 September 1998). "Obituary: The Countess of Oxford and Asquith". The Independent.
- Burke's Peerage & Landed Gentry: Oxford and Asquith, full article only by subscription.

Government offices
Preceded by Sir John Thorp as Commissioner of Saint Lucia	Administrator of Saint Lucia; 1958–1962	Succeeded by Gerald Jackson Bryan
Preceded by Sir John Thorp	Governor of the Seychelles; 1962–1967	Succeeded by Sir Hugh Norman-Walker
Peerage of the United Kingdom
Preceded by Herbert Henry Asquith	Earl of Oxford and Asquith; 1928–2011	Succeeded by Raymond Asquith
