= Michael Palairet =

British diplomat (1882–1956)

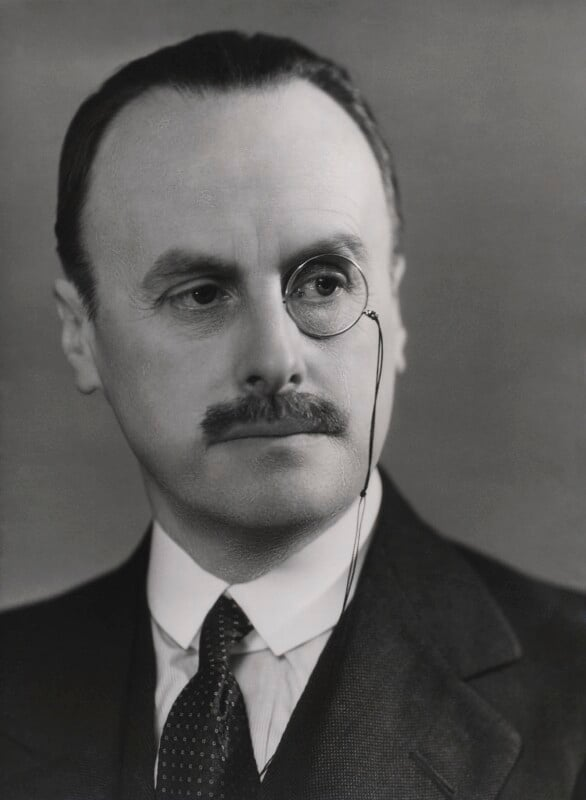
Palairet in 1939

Sir Charles Michael Palairet KCMG (29 September 1882 – 5 August 1956) was a British diplomat who was minister to Romania, Sweden and Austria, and minister and ambassador to Greece.

== Early life ==
Palairet was the son of Captain Charles Harvey Palairet, by his marriage to Emily Henry. After his mother Emily's early death, in 1888, his father married secondly Nora Hamilton Martin (daughter of John Martin MP, a Partner in Martins Bank & Mary Morse). Palairet was educated at Ludgrove School and Eton College. He spent time in France and Germany to improve his languages before joining the Diplomatic Service in 1905.

== Career ==
Palairet was posted to Rome in 1906, Vienna in 1908, Paris in 1913, and Athens in 1917. During this time he rose through the ranks, being appointed a Third Secretary in 1907, a Second Secretary in 1913, and a First Secretary in 1919. In 1918 he was posted back to Paris for the Peace Conference. After a brief time in the Foreign Office in London, he returned to Paris in 1920 with the rank of First Secretary. In 1922 he was posted as Counsellor to Tokyo where he and his family survived the Great Kanto earthquake on 1 September 1923, which devastated Tokyo and destroyed the British embassy. He was promoted to Counsellor of Embassy in 1923. He moved on to Peking in 1925, returned to London in 1926, and returned to Rome again in 1928.

As an experienced middle-rank diplomatist, Palairet then became minister to Romania in December 1929. Here their charm and hospitality and keen interest in Romanian culture won the Palairets a wide circle of friends. Prince Carol, who returned from exile and became king in 1930, showed no grudge at having been requested to leave England in 1928 because of his alleged involvement in a plot to place him on the Romanian throne. Good Anglo-Romanian relations, both political and commercial, were established, but German economic and political penetration had become menacing before Palairet left for Stockholm in 1935. — Peter Neville in Oxford Dictionary of National Biography

Palairet was minister to Sweden 1935–37 before being posted to Vienna as minister to Austria in December 1937. This was a critical time for Austria. Palairet reported to the Foreign Office that Hitler had 'raved like a madman' at Austrian Chancellor Kurt Schuschnigg during their meeting at Berchtesgaden on 12 February 1938. There was nothing that Britain could do: the Anschluss followed on 11–12 March and Palairet was recalled to London. He was sent as the second UK delegate (with Lord Winterton) to the Évian Conference on Jewish refugees on 6–13 July. In September–December 1938 he was sent to take charge of the legation in Bucharest because of the illness of his successor as minister there, Sir Reginald Hoare. In June 1939 he was posted to Athens again as minister to Greece. When the German army approached Athens in April 1941 the British Embassy was evacuated, but Palairet remained accredited to the Greek government in exile and accompanied them to Crete and then, after the fall of Crete in May 1941, to Cairo. His post was upgraded to Ambassador in 1942 before he retired in April 1943. However, he returned to the Foreign Office as a temporary Assistant Under-Secretary, dealing with matters concerning prisoners of war, until July 1948.

Michael Palairet was appointed CMG in December 1923, after the Tokyo earthquake, along with the British consuls at Kobe and Yokohama. He was knighted KCMG in the 1938 Birthday Honours, following his return from Vienna after the Anschluss of Austria in March 1938.

== Private life ==
Palairet married Mary de Vere Studd (1895–1977), a society beauty who was painted by Augustus John. The couple both converted to Roman Catholicism. Their daughter, Anne, was born in Paris in 1916. She married Julian Asquith, 2nd Earl of Oxford and Asquith at the Brompton Oratory in 1947.

== Family ==
Charles Palairet was descended from a Huguenot family called Palayret who had fled initially to the Netherlands, later to England, when Louis XIV revoked the Edict of Nantes in 1689. He was a cousin of the cricketers Lionel Palairet and Richard Palairet. In 1915 he married Mary, daughter of Herbert Studd. Their daughter Anne married Julian Asquith, 2nd Earl of Oxford and Asquith.

Diplomatic posts
Preceded by Robert Greg	British Minister to Romania; 1929–1935	Succeeded by Sir Reginald Hoare
Preceded by Sir Archibald Clark Kerr	British Minister to Sweden; 1935–1937	Succeeded by Sir Edmund Monson, 3rd Baronet
Preceded by Sir Walford Selby	British Minister to Austria; 1937–1938	No representation
Preceded by Sir Sydney Waterlow	British Minister to Greece; 1939–1942	Succeeded by Sir Reginald Leeper
