= List of companies of the United Kingdom A–J =

The United Kingdom of Great Britain and Northern Ireland, commonly known as the United Kingdom (UK or U.K.) or Britain, is a sovereign country located off the northwestern coast of the European mainland. It includes the island of Great Britain, the northeastern part of the island of Ireland, and many smaller islands. The United Kingdom consists of four constituent countries: England, Scotland, Wales and Northern Ireland.

The United Kingdom has a highly developed social market economy. In 2026, the United Kingdom is the fifth-largest national economy in the world measured by nominal gross domestic product (GDP), tenth-largest by purchasing power parity (PPP), and about 21st by nominal GDP per capita, constituting 3.38% of world GDP and 2.13% by purchasing power parity (PPP).

The United Kingdom has one of the most globalised economies and comprises England, Scotland, Wales and Northern Ireland. In 2022, the United Kingdom was the fifth-largest exporter of goods and services in the world and the fourth-largest importer. It also had the fourth-largest outward foreign direct investment, and the fifteenth-largest inward foreign direct investment. In 2022, the United Kingdom's trade with the European Union accounted for 42% of the country's exports and 48% of its total imports. The United Kingdom has a highly efficient and strong social security system, which comprises roughly 24.5% of GDP.

The service sector dominates, contributing 82% of GDP; the financial services industry is particularly important, and London is the second-largest financial centre in the world. Edinburgh was ranked 17th in the world, and 6th in Europe for its financial services industry in 2021. The United Kingdom's technology sector has an enterprise value of US$1.2 trillion, with fintech, health technology, and semiconductors accounting for 48% of the value. The aerospace industry in the United Kingdom is the second-largest national aerospace industry. Its pharmaceutical industry plays an important role in the economy. Of the world's 500 largest companies, 20 are headquartered in the UK, with combined global revenues of US$1.45 trillion. The economy is boosted by North Sea oil and gas production; its proven reserves were estimated at 2.9 billion barrels in 2024, although it has been a net importer of oil since 2005. There are significant regional variations in prosperity, with South East England and North East Scotland being the richest areas per capita. The size of London's economy makes it the biggest city by GDP in Europe. In 2022, the UK spent around 2.8% of GDP on research and development.

In the 18th century, Britain was the first nation to industrialise. During the 19th century, through its expansive colonial empire and technological superiority, Britain had a preeminent role in the global economy, accounting for 9.1% of the world's GDP in 1870. The Second Industrial Revolution was also taking place rapidly in the United States and the German Empire; this presented an increasing economic challenge for the UK, leading into the 20th century. The cost of fighting both the First and Second World Wars further weakened the UK's relative position. During the Great Recession of 2008, the UK economy suffered a significant decline, followed by a period of weak growth and stagnation. Slow growth continued following UK's exit from the EU in 2020, which damaged longer-term growth. The UK economy has also been affected by the 2020 coronavirus pandemic.

== Largest companies ==
This list shows the UK companies in the Fortune Global 500 list for 2025 which ranks firms by total revenues. Only the top five firms are included as a sample.

Rank	Image	Name	2024 revenues (USD $M)	Staff	Notes
18		Shell	$289m	96,000	British multinational oil, gas, and renewable energy company including exploration, production, refining, transport, distribution and marketing, petrochemicals, power generation, trading, biofuels, wind power, energy-kite, and hydrogen power. It was established in 1907, and is headquartered in London, and incorporated in the UK. It was formerly known as Royal Dutch Petroleum Co, and The Shell Transport and Trading Company of the United Kingdom.
33		BP	$194m	100,000	British multinational oil, gas, and renewable energy company including exploration and production, refining, distribution and marketing, petrochemicals, power generation and trading, biofuels, wind power and solar technology. It was established in 1909, and is headquartered in London. It was formerly known as Anglo-Persian Oil Company, Anglo-Iranian Oil Company, and BP Amaco plc.
56		HSBC Holdings	$145m	211,000	British multinational investment bank and financial services holding company. It was first established in 1865 in British Hong Kong, but is now headquartered in London. Former names include The Hong Kong and Shanghai Bank, and The Hong Kong and Shanghai Banking Corporation.
129		Tesco	$89m	229,000	British multinational grocery and general merchandise retailer, petrol retailer, software provider and financial services provider. It was first established in 1919 in Hackney, London, first named Tesco in 1924, and is now headquartered in Welwyn Garden City, Hertfordshire.
179		Lloyds Banking Group	$73m	61,000	British financial services company offering banking, life assurance, and pensions. Its headquarters are in London and its registered office is in Edinburgh. It was formed through the acquisition of HBOS by Lloyds TSB in 2009. It was formerly TSB Group Public Limited Company from 1985 to 1995, and Lloyds TSB Group plc from 1995 to 2009.

== Notable companies ==
This is a list of companies of the United Kingdom as well as those first established in the United Kingdom that are no longer British owned, and also including defunct UK companies. Only companies with articles in Wikipedia are included.

== 0—9 ==
- 104 Films – is a film production company headquartered in Birmingham. It was founded in 2004 by director Justin Edgar and producer Alex Usborne.
- 12 Yard Productions – was a television production company mainly producing game shows and light entertainment. Its programmes include: Eggheads, Coach Trip, Perfection and Big Star's Little Star.
  12 Yard Productions logo
  Headquartered in London; it was founded in 2001 by David Young. The company operated under Hat Trick 12 Yard Productions - a joint venture by Young, the creative team of The Weakest Link and Hat Trick Productions. In 2007, ITV plc acquired 12 Yards for ITV Productions and later it became part of ITV Studios. In 2025, ITV folded 12 Yard and Potato into a new division of ITV Studios named Bright Entertainment.
- 24seven – was an energy company supplying electricity, which operated from 2000 to 2003. Its parent companies were London Electricity, and TXU Europe. In 2003 it became part of LE Group.
- 3 Mills Studios – is a centre for film and TV production. It is located in London.
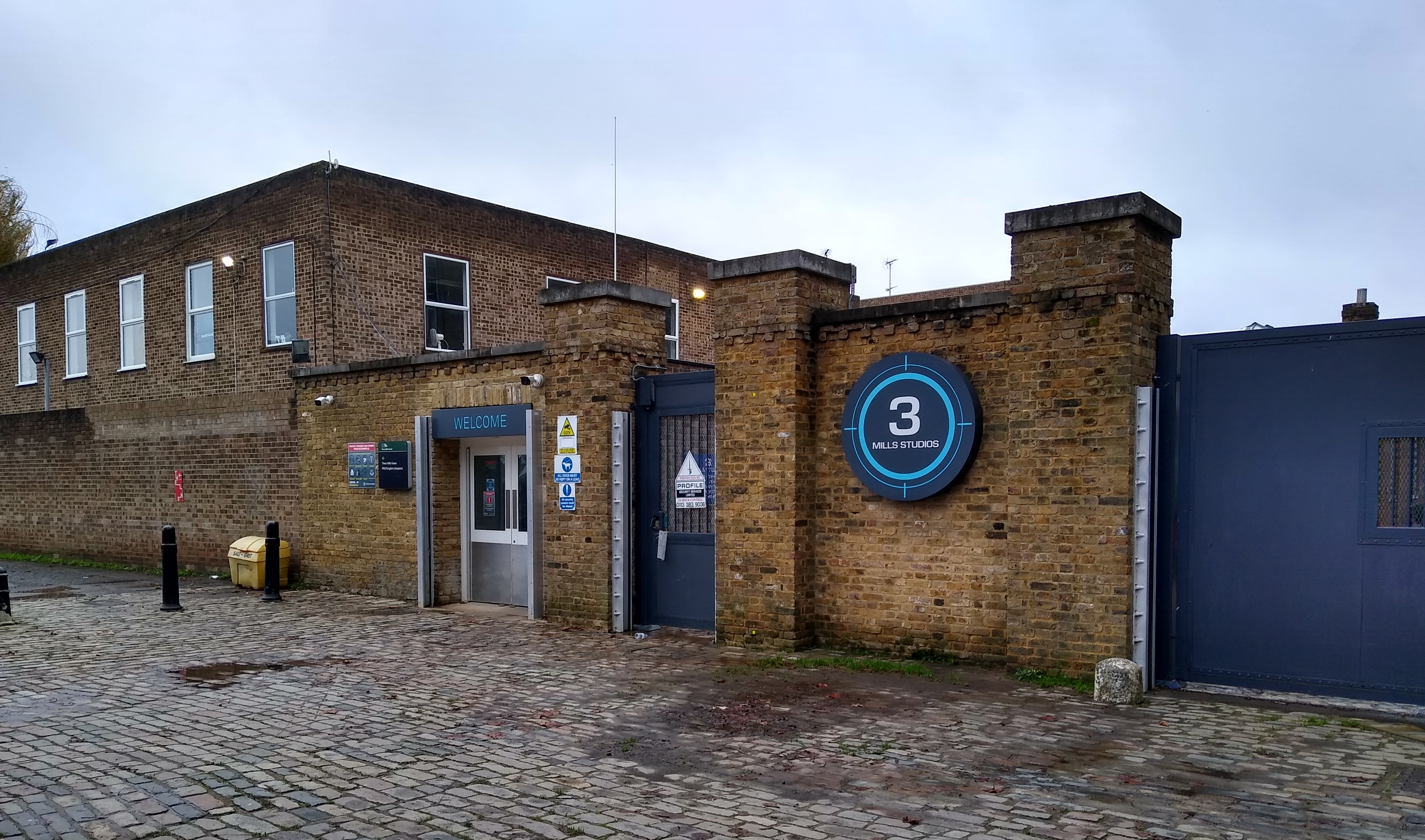
  Entrance to 3 Mills Studios
  It has its roots in the 1980s founding of Bow Studios, Three Mills Island Studios, and Edwin Shirley Productions. In the mid-1990s, the three studios were merged to become 3 Mills Studios, under the management of Workspace Group. In 2004 the studios were acquired by the London Development Agency (LDA) until 2010 when ownership transferred to the London Legacy Development Corporation.
- 3DD Productions – is a UK based television production company. Together with its international licensing company 3DD Entertainment it forms the 3DD Group. Its programmes include: Classic Movies - The Story of for Sky Arts and Rock Legends.
- 3i Group plc – is a British multinational private equity and venture capital company based in London. It invests in mid-market buyouts, growth capital, and infrastructure. It was founded in 1945 by the Bank of England and the main British banks as the Industrial and Commercial Finance Corporation (ICFC). Its purpose was to provide long-term investment funding for small and medium-sized companies. Later it was renamed as Finance for Industry (FFI) and then Investors in Industry (3i). 3i Group was formed as a public company in 1987 when the banks sold their stocks.
- 3i Infrastructure – is an investment trust company headquartered in Jersey. It was founded in 2007 by 3iGroup who own 29% of the company.
- 3SixtyMedia – is a television post-production and media management services company. Headquartered in MediaCityUK, Manchester; it was founded in 2000 as a joint-venture by BBC Resources and Granada to combine their Manchester studios and post-production facilities and technical staff. It was later co-owned by ITV Studios and BBC Studioworks and no longer manages studios.
- 4imprint Group – is a direct marketing company headquartered in London that produces promotional merchandise.
  4imprint Group logo
  It was founded in 1985 as Nelson Marketing in Logansport, Indiana US. In 1996 it was acquired by Bemrose Corporation and in 2000 its name was changed to 4imprint Group. Most of its business is in the US and Canada.
- 99p Stores – was a company that operated a discount store chain. It was a family-run business founded in 2001 by Nadir Lalani.
  99p Stores logo
  Its subsidiary store chain was Family Bargains. In 2015 it was acquired by Poundland who rebranded the stores to Poundland.

== A ==
- A & C Black – is a book publishing company that was founded in 1807 by Adam Black and Charles Black in Edinburgh. Since 1889 it is headquartered in London and from 2000 it is owned by Bloomsbury Publishing.
- A.G. Barr – is a soft drinks manufacturer best known for the drink Irn-Bru. Established in 1875 by Robert Barr in Falkirk, Scotland, it is now headquartered in Cumbernauld, Scotland.
  A. G. Barr logo
  Its production sites are in Cumbernauld, Forfar, and Milton Keynes. In 2022 it acquired Boost Drinks. In 2022 its revenue was £268 million, with a net income of £27 million.
- AAH Pharmaceuticals – is a pharmaceuticals wholesaler. It was formerly an anthracite producer and supplier, and supplier of building materials, transport, warehousing, and environmental services. Established in 1892, its headquarters is in Coventry. It was formerly named Amalgamated Anthracite Collieries. It is owned by Hallo Healthcare Group.
- Aardman Animations – is a film studio producing animation films and television programmes using stop-motion and clay animation techniques or computer animation.
  Aardman Animations logo
  It is known for Wallace & Gromit, Chicken Run and Shaun the Sheep. Established in 1972, its headquarters is in Bristol.
- Abbey Coachworks – was a coachbuilding company based in London that operated between 1930 and 1938. It was also known as Wingham Martin Walter.
- Abbey National – was a financial services company offering banking, mortgages, and investment that operated from 1944 to 2010. It was initially a building society and later also an estate agent.
  Abbey National logo
  Its headquarters was in London. Also known as Abbey, it was formed by the merger of the Abbey Road Building Society with the National Building Society. In 2010 it was subsumed into Santander UK.
- AbbottVision – is a film and TV production company. Established in 2008, its headquarters is in Manchester.
- ABC Cinemas – was a cinema chain from 1927 to 2017.
- Abcam – is a biotechnology and life sciences company that produces protein research tools. It was established in 1998.
- Abcodia – is a biotechnology company focused on biomarkers for cancer screening. Established in 2010, its headquarters is in Cambridge, Cambridgeshire.
- Abellio ScotRail – operating under the name ScotRail was the national passenger train operating company of Scotland from 2015 to 2022. It was a subsidiary of Abellio.
- Aberdeen Asia Focus – is an investment trust company focused on smaller quoted companies in Asia. It was established in 1995 as Abtrust Asian Smaller Companies Investment Trust. It is managed by Aberdeen Group.
- Aberdeen Asset Management – was an investment management company from 1983 to 2017. Its headquarters was in Aberdeen, Scotland. In 2017 it was merged with Standard Life to become a subsidiary of Standard Life Aberdeen, since renamed as Aberdeen Group.
- Aberdeen Group (trading as aberdeen) – is an investment and financial services company headquartered in Edinburgh, Scotland.
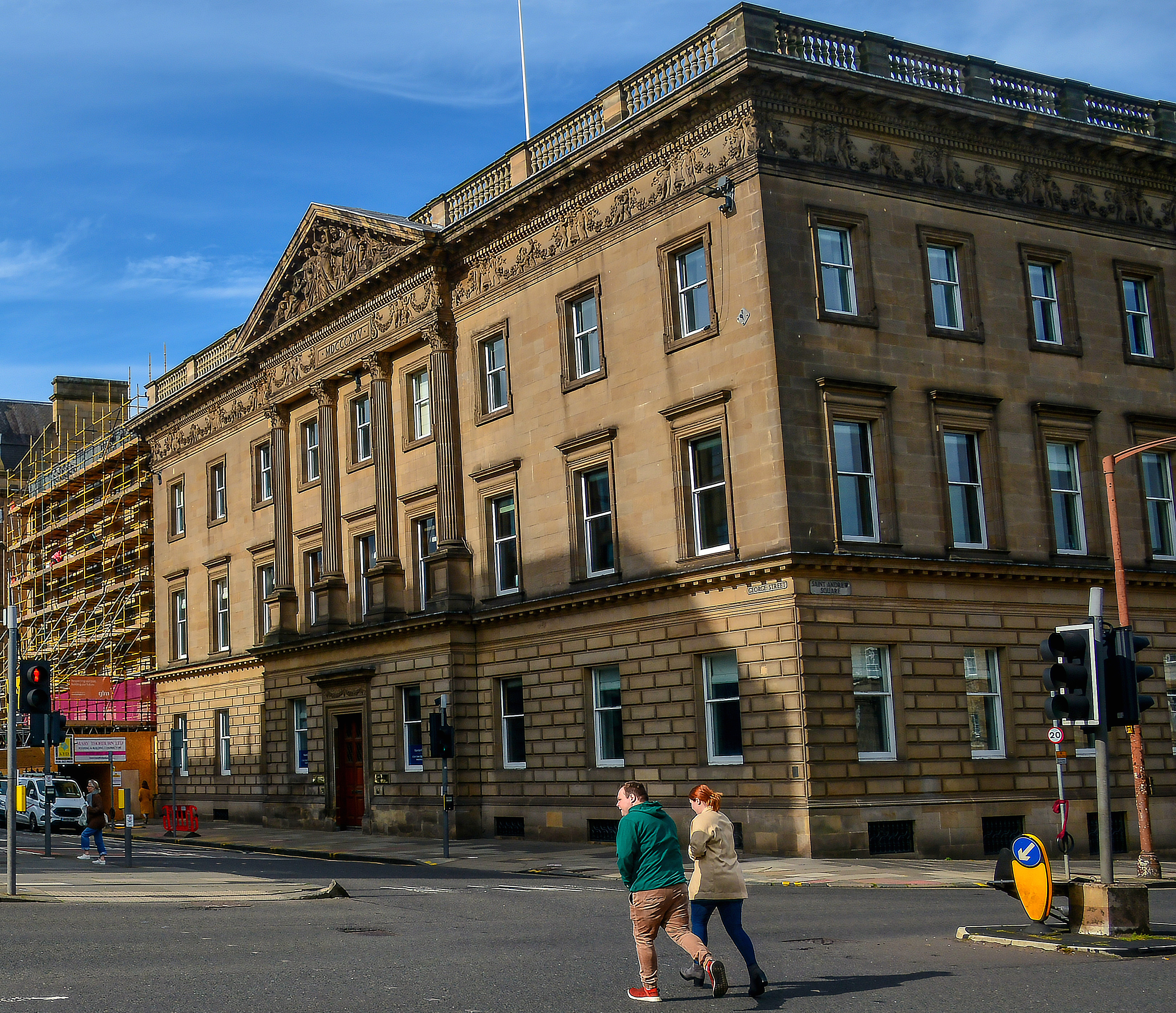
  Aberdeen Group headquarters in Edinburgh
  It was founded in 2017 by the merger of Standard Life with Aberdeen Asset Management to form Standard Life Aberdeen. In 2018 the Standard Life business was sold to Phoenix Group followed by the brand name in 2021. The company name was changed to abdrn plc from 2021 to 2025 when it was changed to Aberdeen Group plc. In 2025 it had £390 billion of assets under management.
- Aberforth Smaller Companies Trust plc – is an investment trust focused on investments in smaller companies. Established in 1990, it is headquartered in Edinburgh, Scotland.
- Aberlady, Gullane and North Berwick Railway – was a railway company established in 1893 that operated from 1898 to 1900.
- Aberystwith and Welsh Coast Railway – was a railway company established in 1861 that operated from 1863 to 1865.
- ABK Architects – is an architectural practice previously named Ahrends, Burton and Koralek. It was established in 1961 in London but since 1996 is based in Dublin, Ireland.
- Abrdn – is the former name of Aberdeen Group, an investment and financial services company.
- Academy Films – is a film and TV production company creating commercials, music videos, short films, digital content, art installations and feature films.
  Academy Films logo
  Headquartered in London; it was established in 1985 by Lizie Gower.
- Accident Advice Helpline – was a personal injury law firm and former claims management company. Founded in 2000, it went into administration in 2004. It re-emerged as a new company named Accident Advice Helpline Direct Group which was sold to Quindell plc in 2013.
- Acrylicize – is a company of artists, designers and craftsmen. Founded in 2003 by artist James Burke; it is based in London and New York.
- Acteon Group – is a subsea services company mainly supplying the oil, gas, and renewable industries. Established in 2004, its headquarters is in Norwich, Norfolk. It was formed from the UWG Group.
- Actis – is a global investment firm focused on infrastructure in emerging markets including energy and real estate.
  Actis logo
  Founded in 2004 as a spin-out from CDC Group; it is headquartered in London. It was bought by General Atlantic in 2024.
- Adam & Company – is a financial services company (private banking and investment management). Established in 1983, its headquarters is in Edinburgh, Scotland. In 2018, the retail banking assets of Royal Bank of Scotland were transferred to Adam and Company, which was renamed Royal Bank of Scotland, with Adam and Company continuing as a trading name of the Royal Bank of Scotland.
- Adelphi Films – is a film production and distribution company. It was established in 1939.
- Admiral Group – is a financial services company headquartered in Cardiff, Wales. It provides insurance products under brands Admiral, Bell, Elephant, Diamond and Veygo.
  Admiral Group logo
  It was founded in 1991 as a division of the Brockbank Group. In 1999 Henry Engelhardt led a management buyout of Admiral Group from the Brockbank Group. It launched the price comparison sites Compare.com and Confused.com but later sold them. In 2004 it was listed on the London Stock Exchange.
- AEP Plantations – is a company headquartered in London that operates palm oil plantations in Indonesia and Malaysia. It was founded in 1985 and formerly named Anglo-Eastern Plantations. It was renamed AEP Plantations in 2025.
- Affinity Water – is a utility company supplying water. Established in 2012, its headquarters is in Hatfield, Hertfordshire. It was formed by the purchase and merger of Veolia Water Central, Veolia Water Southeast, and Veolia Water East.
- AGA Rangemaster Group Ltd – is a manufacturer of range cookers including the AGA cooker, kitchen appliances, and interior furnishings. Its brands include: AGA, La Cornue, Rangemaster, Divertimenti, Fired Earth, and Marvel.
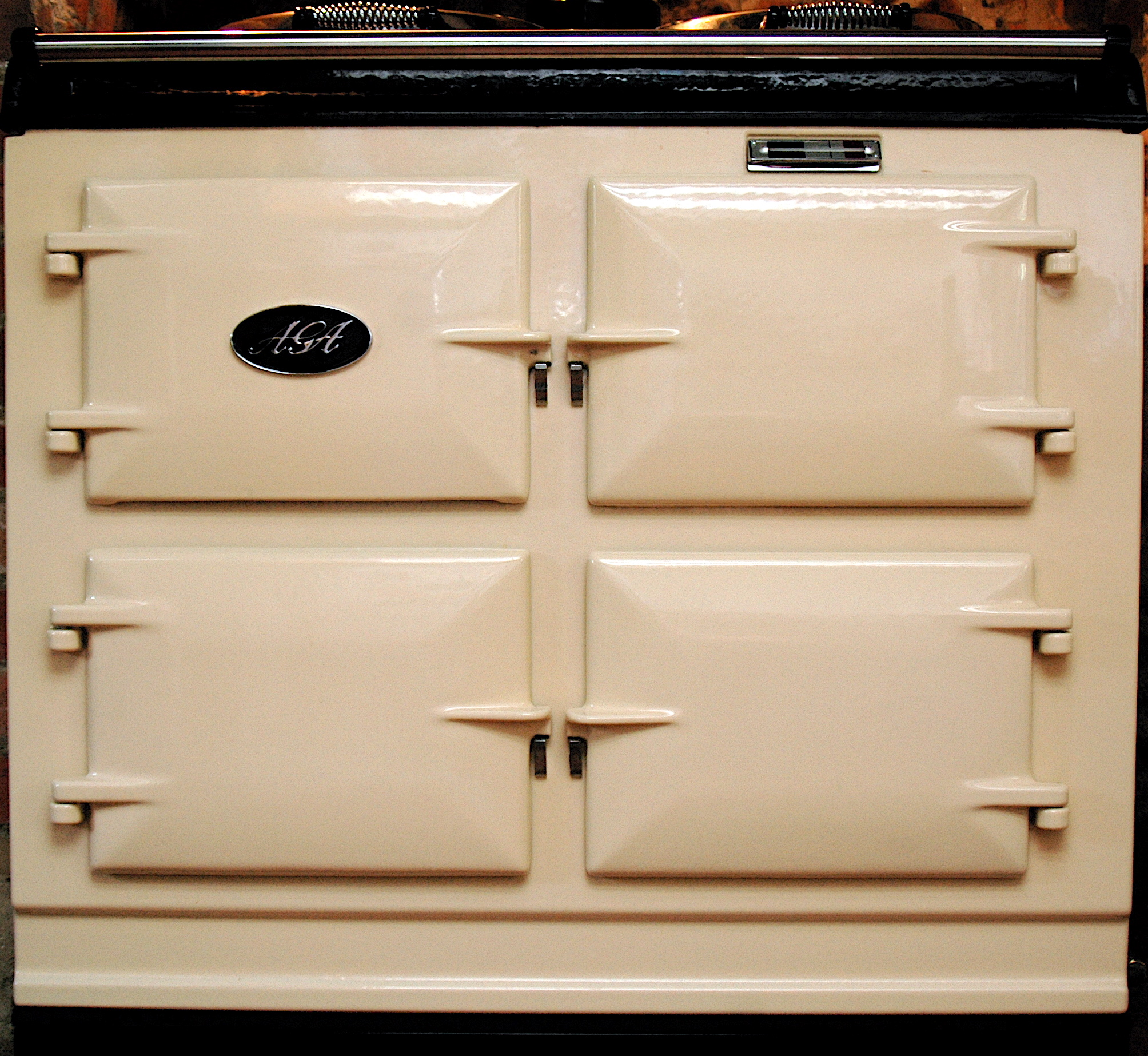
  Aga GC3
  Its North American subsidiary is AGA Marvel. It is headquartered in Leamington Spa, Warwickshire. The roots of the business date back to the 1920s when the AGA cooker was invented and initially produced in Sweden. Then, in the 1930s, they were produced under license in the UK and since 1957 most production has continued in the UK. In 1969 the manufacturers of AGA cookers, Allied Ironfounders, was acquired by Glynwed. In 1997 Glynwed was acquired by Mueller Industries Inc, and the AGA division was renamed AGA Foodservice Group, and then Aga Rangemaster in 2008. In 2015 it was acquired by Middleby Corporation.
- AIB Group (UK) plc – is a banking company that operates the UK banking division of Allied Irish Banks of which it is a subsidiary. Registered in Northern Ireland; it trades as Allied Irish Bank (GB) for business banking in the UK; and as AIB (NI) for personal, and business banking in Northern Ireland.
- Air Navigation and Engineering Company – was an aircraft, and cyclecar manufacturer from 1919 to 1927. Its headquarters was in Addlestone, Surrey. It was formerly the Bleriot & SPAD Manufacturing Company.
- Airtel Africa plc – is a multinational company that provides telecommunications and mobile money services in 14 African countries. Headquartered in London, it is majority owned by Bharti Airtel. In 2022 its revenue was £4.7 billion, with a net income of £750 million.
- AJ Bell plc – is a financial services company that provides online investment platforms and stockbroker services.
  AJ Bell logo
  It is headquartered in Manchester. It was founded in 1995 by Andy Bell and Nicholas Littlefair. It was floated on the London Stock Exchange in 2018. In 2022 its revenue was £163 million, with a net income of £46 million.
- Al Rayan Bank plc – is a bank offering Sharia compliant financial services. Headquartered in London; it was founded in 2004 as the Islamic Bank of Britain plc. Since 2014 it is owned by Islamic bank Masraf Al Rayan, and renamed Al Rayan Bank plc.
- Aldemore Bank plc – is a bank offering personal and business financial services with a focus on small and medium-sized businesses. Headquartered in Reading, Berkshire; it was founded in 2009. From 2015 it was listed on the London Stock Exchange until it was acquired by South African banking company FirstRand in 2017.
- Alex Wilson & Company – was an engine manufacturing company, see Vauxhall Motors.
- Alfa Financial Software Holdings (trading as Alfa) – is a software provider for the automotive, equipment, and asset finance industries.
  Alfa Financial Software logo
  Headquartered in London; it was founded in 1990 by Justin Cooper, Ian Hargrave and Andrew Page as CHP Consulting. In 2016 it was rebranded to Alfa.
- Alfarisi – is a UK-based multinational conglomerate spanning commerce, technology, fragrance, and education.
- All3Media – was a British international independent television, film, and digital production and distribution company based in London. It owned 45 production and distribution companies and labels in the UK, mainland Europe, the US, and New Zealand. Its programmes include: Call the Midwife, The Traitors, Hollyoaks, Midsomer Murders, Shameless, Skins and Shortland Street. It was founded in 1993 as Chrysalis Visual Entertainment, then renamed Chrysalis TV Group in 2001. It was renamed All3Media in 2003 after it was acquired from Chrysalis by a consortium led by ex-Granada chief Steve Morrison, former ITV Head of Programming, David Liddiment, and former Operations MD at Granada, Jules Burns and John Pfeil with the backing of Bridgepoint Group.
  All3Media logo
  In 2006 it was acquired by Permira and the All3Media management team led by chief executive Steve Morrison. In 2014 it was acquired by Discovery, Inc. and Liberty Global until 2024 when it was acquired by RedBird IMI - a joint-venture between New York-based RedBird Capital Partners and Abu Dhabi based International Media Investments (IMI). In 2026 it was merged into Banijay Entertainment under the ownership of Banijay Group and RedBird IMI. Its acquisitions included: Red Rooster (UK), South Pacific Pictures (NZ), Eclipse Television & Video (Ireland), Lion Television (UK, US, and China), Mersey Television (UK), MME Moviement (Germany), Maverick Television (UK, and US), Objective Productions (UK), Zoo Productions (US), Optomen (UK and US), Neal Street Productions (UK), New Pictures (UK), Two Brothers Pictures (UK), Raw (US), Betty TV (US), Aurora Media Worldwide (UK), Tower Productions (Germany), Silverback Films (UK), and NENT Studios UK.
- Allen & Hanburys – was a pharmaceuticals manufacturer from 1715 to 1958. Headquartered in London, it was absorbed by Glaxo Laboratories in 1958.
- Alliance & Leicester – was a financial services company providing banking and insurance, that was formerly a building society.
  Alliance & Leicester logo
  It operated from 1985 to 2011. Its headquarters was in Narborough, Leicestershire. It was formed by the merger of the Alliance Building Society with the Leicester Building Society. In 2011 it was subsumed into Santander UK.
- Alliance Witan (formerly Alliance Trust) – is an investment and financial services company headquartered in London. It was founded in 1888 by the merger of 3 Dundee-based mortgage and loan companies: the Dundee Investment Company, the Dundee Mortgage and Trust Investment Company, and the Oregon and Washington Trust. In 1986 it began offering pensions. In 2006 it was merged with the Second Alliance Trust. In 2024 it was merged with Witan Investment Trust to form Alliance Witan.
- Allianz Technology Trust plc – is an investment trust focused on technology companies. Founded in 1995; it is managed by Allianz Global Investors which is owned by Allianz.
- Allica Bank - is a financial services company providing banking and other products. Established in 2019; it is headquartered in London and Milton Keynes.
- Allied Film Makers – was a film production company. Established in 1959, it is defunct.
- Allied Stars – was a film production company. It was established in the late 1970s.
- Ambala Foods – is a confectionary company that sells South Asian sweets and savoury snacks. It was established in 1965 by Indian-born entrepreneur Mohammed Ali Khan in London. In 2025, it was acquired by Cake Box in a £22 million deal.
- Amersham – was a manufacturer of radiopharmaceutical products for nuclear medicine from 1946 to 2003.
  Amersham logo
  Its headquarters was in Amersham, Buckinghamshire. It was previously known as The Radiochemical Centre (RTC) Amersham, Amersham International, and Nycomed Amersham. In 2003 it was acquired by General Electric and incorporated into GE Healthcare.
- Amicus Productions – was a film production company from 1962 to 1977. It was based at Shepperton Studios.
- Andrew Knowles and Sons – was a coal mining company from circa 1805 to 1929. It became part of Manchester Collieries.
- Anglesey Mining – is a mining company.
- Anglia Railways – was a train operating company that operated the Anglia franchise in the East of England from January 1997 to 31 March 2004 with the main route being the Great Eastern Main Line. It was owned by GB Railways from 1997 to 2003 and then FirstGroup from 2003 to 2004. It was succeeded by National Express in 2004 under the new Greater Anglia franchise.
- Anglian Water Authority – was a state owned utility company providing water supply and sewage disposal from 1974 to 1979. It was succeeded by Anglian Water.
- Anglian Water Group – is a holding company that is parent to Anglian Water. Headquartered in Huntingdon, it is owned by Osprey Consortium.
- Anglian Water – is a utility company providing water supply and sewage disposal. Established in 1979, its headquarters is in Huntingdon, Cambridgeshire. It was preceded by Anglian Water Authority. Its parent company is Anglian Water Group.
- Anglo American – is a British multinational mining company. Established in 1917, its headquarters are in London, UK and Johannesburg, South Africa. In 2022 its revenue was $35 billion, with a net income of $6 billion.
- Anglo—EMI Film Distributors Ltd – was a film production and distribution company, see EMI Films.
- Anglo-Amalgamated – was a film production and distribution company from 1945 to 1971.
- Annandale Distillery Company – is the owner of Annandale distillery in Annan, Dumfries and Galloway, Scotland which produces Scotch whisky.
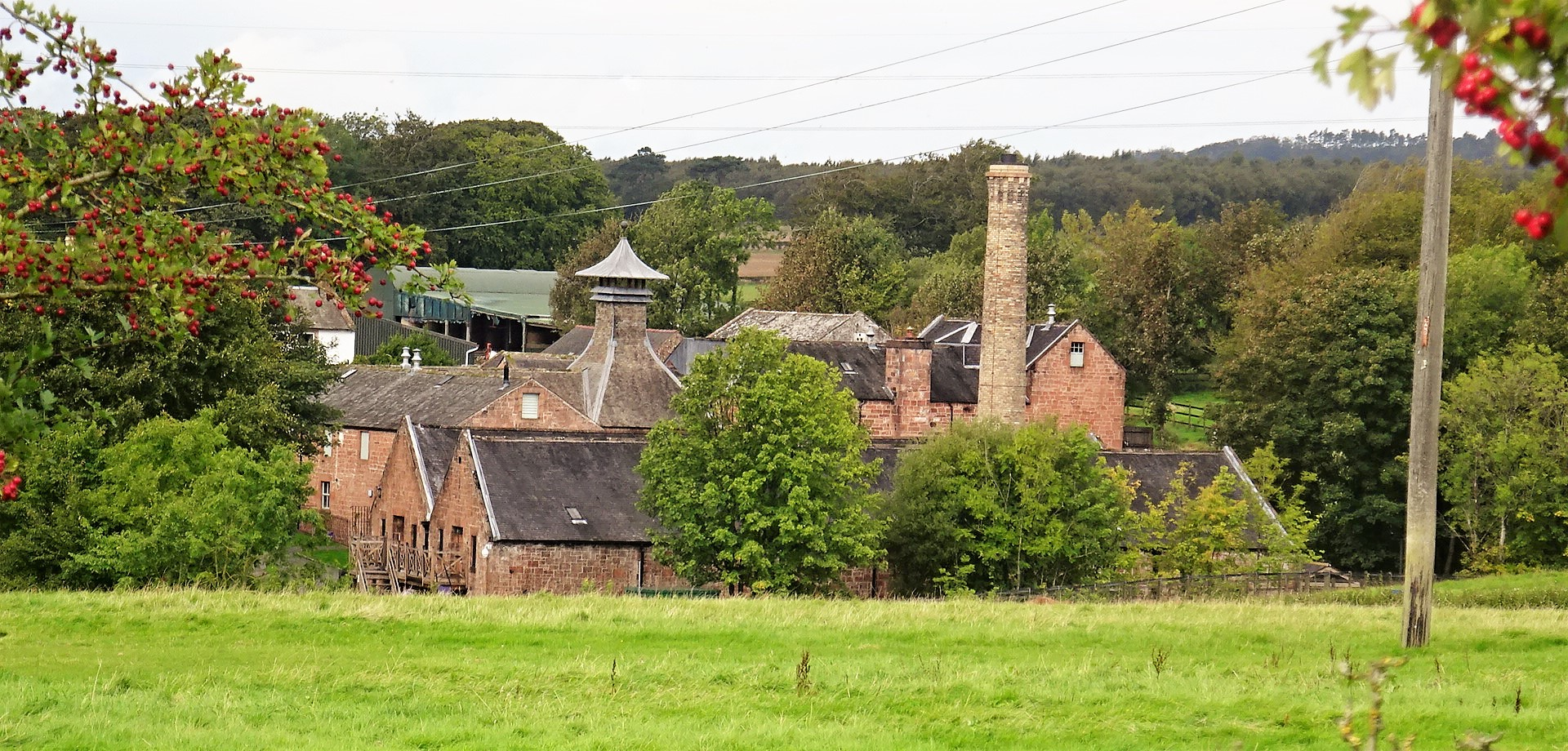
  Annandale Distillery
  It was founded in 2007 by David Thomson and Theresa Church.
- Anstruther and St Andrews Railway – was a railway company established in 1883 that operated from 1883 to 1897 when the line was absorbed into the North British Railway.
- AO World (trading as ao.com) – is a retailer of household kitchen appliances, other electricals, mobile phones and other products. Headquartered in Bolton; it was founded in 2000 by John Roberts as Appliances Online. In 2013 it was rebranded as AO.com. In 2019 it launched AO Mobile to sell mobile phones, and AO Finance to offer credit for purchases. In 2024 it acquired musicMagpie.
- Aon – is a British and American financial services company. It provides brokerage and consulting services for risk management, insurance, and reinsurance, and services related to health insurance, retirement plans, pension plans, and talent advisory. Established in 1982; its headquarters are in London.
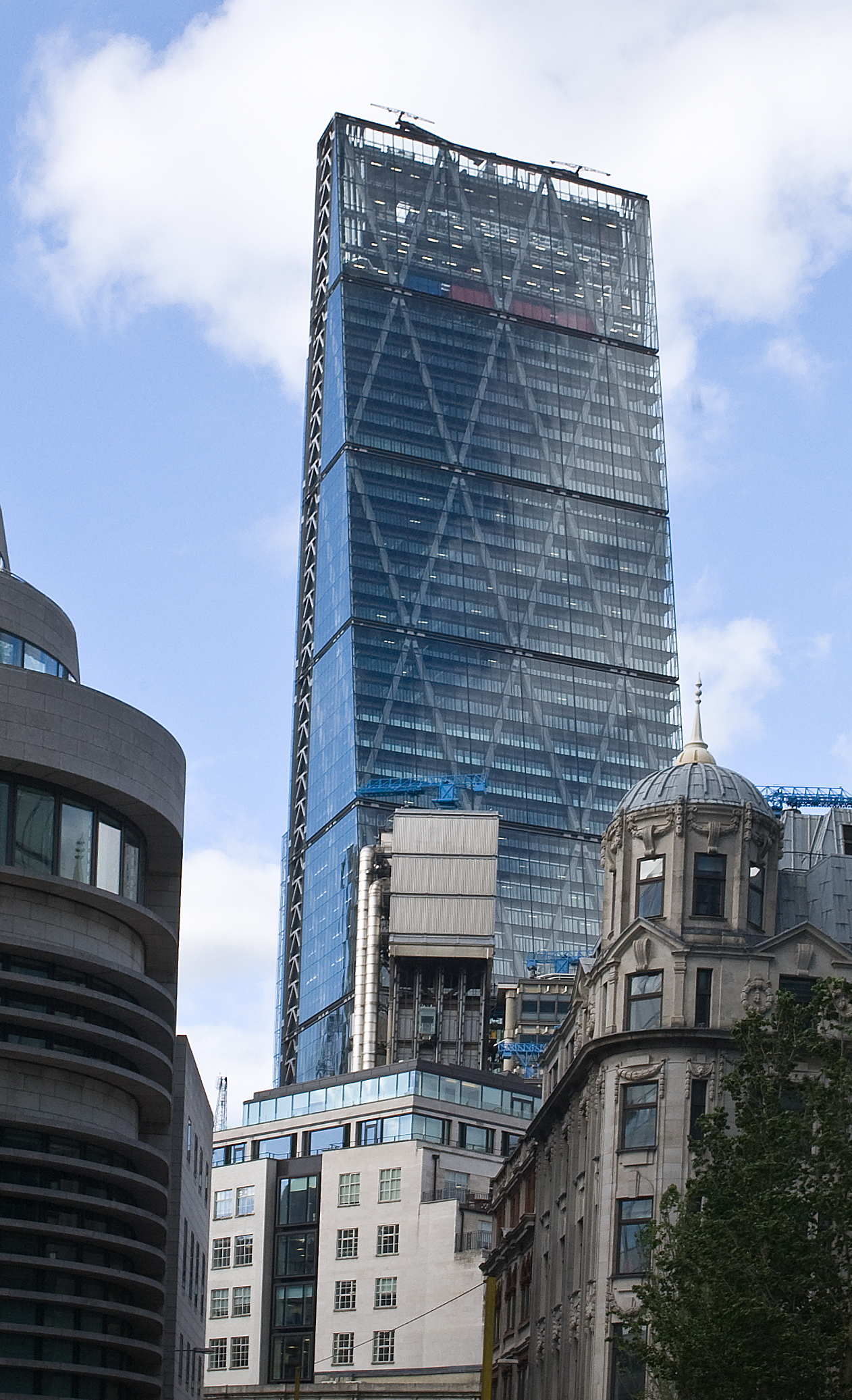
  Aon headquarters at 122 Leadenhall Street
  Founded in Chicago by Patrick Ryan, Aon was created when the Ryan Insurance Group merged with the Combined Insurance Company of America. It is the second largest insurance broker in the world.
- AP Films – (APF) was a television and film production, and publishing company from 1957 to 1977. Its headquarters was in Maidenhead, Berkshire. It later became Century 21 Productions.
- Apollo Cinemas – was a cinema chain from 2002 to 2013.
- Applied Nutrition – is a company producing and selling nutrition supplements. Headquartered in Knowsley, Merseyside; it was founded in 2014 by Tom Ryder from a shop in Kirkby. It was listed on the London Stock Exchange in 2024.
- Arash Motor Company – is a high performance automobile manufacturer.
  Arash Motor Company logo
  Established in 1999, its headquarters is in Newmarket, Suffolk. It was formerly named Farboud Limited.
- Arbikie distillery – is a producer of Scotch whisky, vodka, and gin located in Inverkeilor, Scotland. It was established in 2013 by the Stirling family.
- Arbuthnot Latham & Co. Ltd – is a private and merchant bank offering private banking, commercial banking, and wealth management. Headquartered in London; it was founded in 1833 by Alfred Latham and John A. Arbuthnot. In 2022 its revenue was £120 million, with a net income of £16.5 million.
- Archers Film Productions – was a film production company from 1943 to 1957.
- Ardrossan Railway – was a railway company established in 1827 that operated from 1831 to 1854.
- Argonon – is an independent television and film production and distribution group headquartered in London with offices in London, Glasgow, Los Angeles, New York, and Oklahoma. It owns the following companies: Argonon USA, Bandicoot, BriteSpark Films, Leopard Pictures, Leopard USA, Like a Shot Entertainment, Rose Rock, and Windfall Films. Its programmes include: The Masked Singer, The Masked Dancer, Worzel Gummidge, Eve and Cash in the Attic. It was founded in 2011 by James Burstall through the merger of Leopard Films with Remedy Productions.
- Argos – is a retailer with a chain of shops and an online store. Established in 1972, its headquarters is in Milton Keynes, Buckinghamshire.
  Argos logo
  In 2026 it was acquired by Swift Partners.
- Aria Films – is a film production, finance, and consultancy company. Established in 2002, its headquarters is in London.
- Aricom – was a mining and metals company from 2003 to 2009/10. Its headquarters was in London. It was formerly part of Peter Hambro Mining who, as Petropavlovsk reacquired it in 2009.
- Ariel Motor Company – is an automobile and motor bike manufacturer. Established in 1991 its headquarters is in Crewkerne, Somerset. It was formerly named Solocrest Ltd.
- Armitage Shanks – is a manufacturer of bathroom fixtures and plumbing supplies headquartered in Stoke-on-Trent, Staffordshire.
  Armitage Shanks logo
  It was founded in 1817 by Thomas Bond in Armitage, Staffordshire. In 1907 it was incorporated as Armitage Ware Ltd, and, in 1969, it was merged with Shanks Holdings Ltd to form Armitage Shanks. Since 2024 it is part of the Villeroy & Boch Group.
- Armstrong Siddeley – was a manufacturer of automobiles, aircraft engines and light engineering from 1919 to 1960. Headquartered in Coventry, it was established by the merger of Armstrong Whitworth with Siddeley-Deasy. There were later mergers/takeovers with Hawker Aircraft, and Bristol Aero Engines. In 1960 it became Bristol Siddeley.
- Armstrong-CCM Motorcycles – was a motorcycle manufacturer from 1980 to 1987. Headquartered in Bolton, it was formerly known as Clews Competition Motorcycles.
- Arnold Clark Automobiles – is a retail company that operates a car dealership network in the UK. It is headquartered in Glasgow, Scotland.
  Arnold Clark logo
  It was founded in 1954 by Arnold Clark. The Phoenix Car Company is one of its divisions and it has two subsidiaries: Arnold Clark Finance, and Harry Fairbairn.
- Arriva Trains Wales – was a train operating company owned by Arriva UK Trains that worked the Wales & Borders franchise from 7 December 2003 to 13 October 2018. It ran most of the services across Wales, including all Welsh railway stations, as well as services to North West England, the West Midlands and South West England.
  Arriva Trains Wales logo
  In 2003 the Strategic Rail Authority awarded the Wales & Border franchise to Arriva for 15 years subject to 5 year performance reviews. On 7 December 2003 Arriva Trains Wales took over from Wales and Borders. Responsibility for the franchise was later devolved to the Welsh government which worked closely with Arriva Trains Wales to manage and develop the Welsh rail network. Arriva did not tender for the renewal of the franchise which was won by KeolisAmey Wales who took over from Arriva Trains Wales in October 2018.
- Arrival – is an electric vehicle manufacturer, specialising in commercial vehicles. Established in 2015, its headquarters is in Yarnton, Oxfordshire. It was formerly named Charge Automotive.
- Arrol-Aster – was an automobile manufacturer from 1927 to 1931. Headquartered in Dumfries, Scotland, it was formed by the merger of Arrol-Johnston and Aster.
- Arrol-Johnston – was an automobile manufacturer from 1895 to 1931. Its headquarters was in Glasgow, Scotland. It was formerly the Mo-Car Syndicate. In 1927 it merged with Aster to become Arrol-Aster.
- Ascari Cars – was an automobile manufacturer from 1995 to 2010. Its headquarters was in Banbury, Oxfordshire.
- Ascential – is a business-to-business media company providing exhibitions and festivals, and information services in product design, marketing, sales, and built environment and policy. It is headquartered in London. It was founded in 1947 by Richard Pattinson Winfrey as a newspaper publisher named the East Midlands Allied Press (EMAP). It took over the newspapers created or bought by Richard Winfrey. It later diversified into magazine publishing, and radio broadcasting. In 1996 it sold its newspaper titles to Johnston Press. In 2008 it sold its radio, television, and consumer media division EMAP Radio to Bauer Media Group. In 2012 it was renamed Top Right Group and in 2015 renamed Ascential. In 2017 it sold its business magazine brands to Metropolis International including the EMAP name as EMAP Publishing. In 2024 it was acquired by Informa.
- Asda Stores - is a supermarket chain also offering some financial services, and a mobile phone virtual network through its subsidiary Asda Mobile.
  Asda logo
  Established in 1949, its headquarters is in Leeds. In 1999 it was acquired by Walmart, then in 2021 it was acquired by EG Group and TDR Capital. In 2024 TDR Capital assumed overall control.
- Ashmore Group – is an investment company focused on emerging markets. Headquartered in London; it was founded in 1992 by the Australia and New Zealand Banking Group (ANZ). It was the subject of a management buyout in 1999, and listed on the London Stock Exchange in 2006. In 2025 it had £47.6 billion of assets under management.
- Ashoka India Equity Investment Trust – is an investment trust company focused on Indian companies. Headquartered in London; it was established in 2018 and is managed by White Oak Capital Management.
- Ashtead Group plc – is an industrial equipment rental company headquartered in London. It was founded in 1947 in Ashtead, Surrey as Ashtead Plant and Tool Hire. Its main subsidiary is Sunbelt Rentals which operates in the United States. In 2022 its revenue was £7.9 billion with a net income of £1.2 billion.
- Ashtons – was a housebuilding company in Yorkshire. It was founded in 1933 by Norman Ashton in Leeds, and incorporated in 1938 as Norman C. Ashton Ltd. It was acquired by Orme in 1972.
- ASOS plc – is an online clothing and cosmetics retailer mainly aimed at young adults.
  ASOS logo
  It produces clothing and accessories for its own brand. It also has a marketplace platform for independent boutiques, vintage collectors, individuals, and designers to trade online. It is headquartered in Camden Town, London. I was founded in 2000 by Nick Robertson, Andrew Regan, Quentin Griffiths, and Deborah Thorpe. It was first named AsSeenOnScreen because it sold imitations of clothing from film and television. In 2001 it joined London's Alternative Investment Market. In 2004 it was renamed ASOS. In 2021 it acquired the brands Topshop, Topman, Miss Selfridge, and HIIT from Arcadia Group with the first three becoming subsidiaries. In 2022 its total revenue was £3.9 billion, with a net income loss of £30 million.
- Aspall Cyder Ltd – is a producer of cider, apple juice, apple cider vinegar, and apple-based balsamic vinegar. It also imports and markets some other vinegars. It is located in Aspall, Suffolk, and was established in the early 18th century. In 2018 it was purchased by Molson Coors.
- Associated British Foods plc (ABF) – is a British multinational food processing and retailing company. Headquartered in London, it was established in 1935. In 2022 its revenue was £16.9 billion, with a net income of £1 billion.
- Associated British Picture Corporation (ABPC) – was a film production, distribution, and exhibition company from 1927 to 1970. It was originally British International Pictures (BIC).
- Associated Motor Cycles – was the parent company of motorcycle companies including: Matchless, A. J. Stevens & Co. Francis-Barnett, James Cycle Co, Norton, and Sunbeam, from 1938 to 1966.
- Aster – was an automobile, and aircraft engines manufacturer from 1913 to 1931.
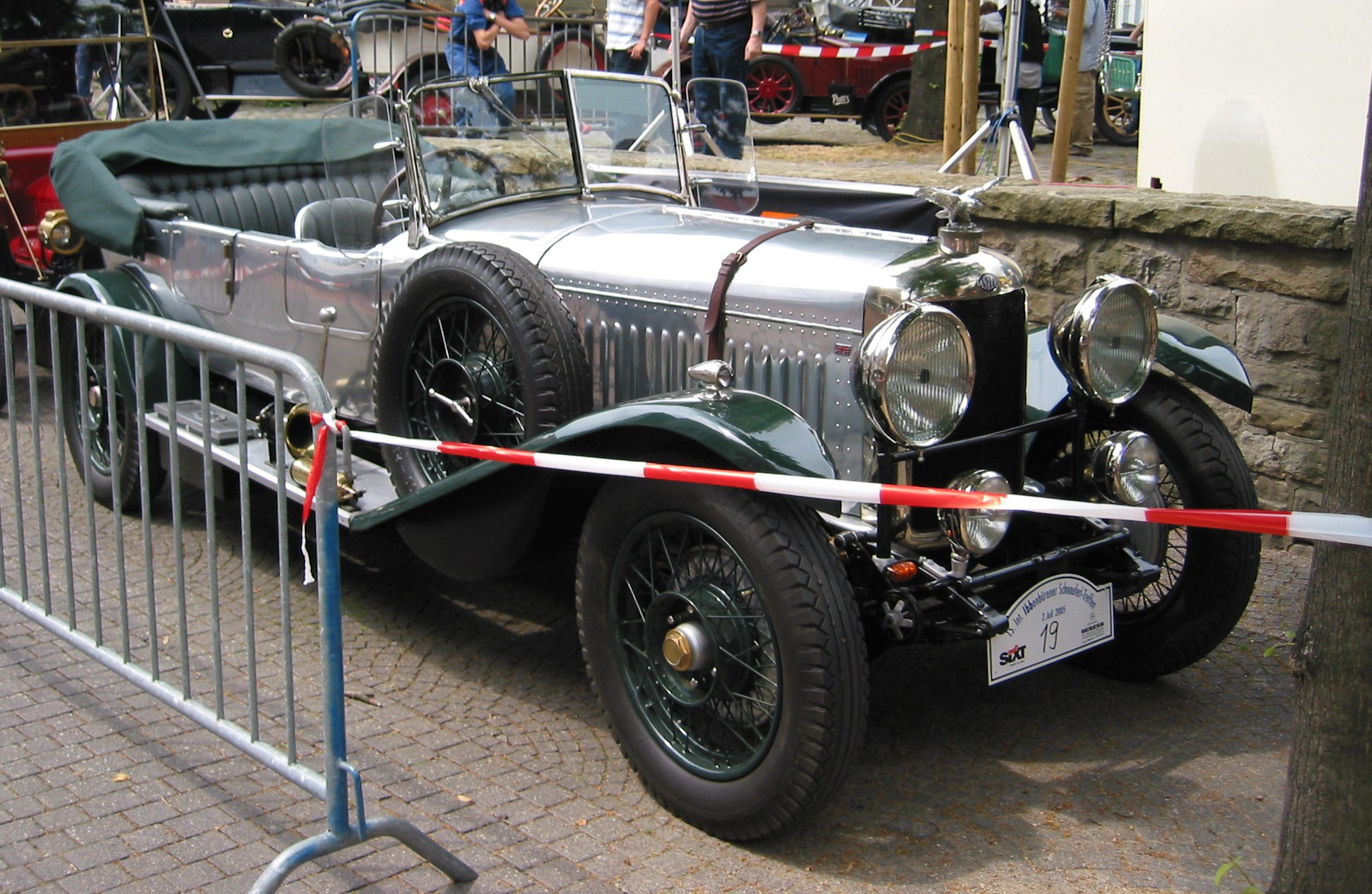
  Aster car
  It was headquartered in Wembley, London, then Dumfries, Scotland. It was formerly Begbie Engineering. In 1927 it merged with Arrol-Johnston.
- Astley and Tyldesley Collieries – was a coal mining company from 1900 to 1929. It became part of Manchester Collieries.
- Astley and Bedford Collieries – was a coal mining company from the 1840s to the 1850s. Its headquarters was in Bedford, Leigh.
- Aston Manor Cider Ltd – is a producer of cider and perry and a bottling company. It is headquartered in Witton, Birmingham. It was founded in 1981 as a beer brewery. In 2009 it acquired the Devon Cider Company. In 2018 it was acquired by Agrial. Its brands include Frosty Jacks, Kingstone Press Cider, Friels, Knights Malvern Gold, Crompton Oaks, and 3 Hammers.
- Aston Martin – is a manufacturer of automobiles, luxury goods, and previously aircraft components during WWII. It also has a motorsport subsidiary named Aston Martin Racing.
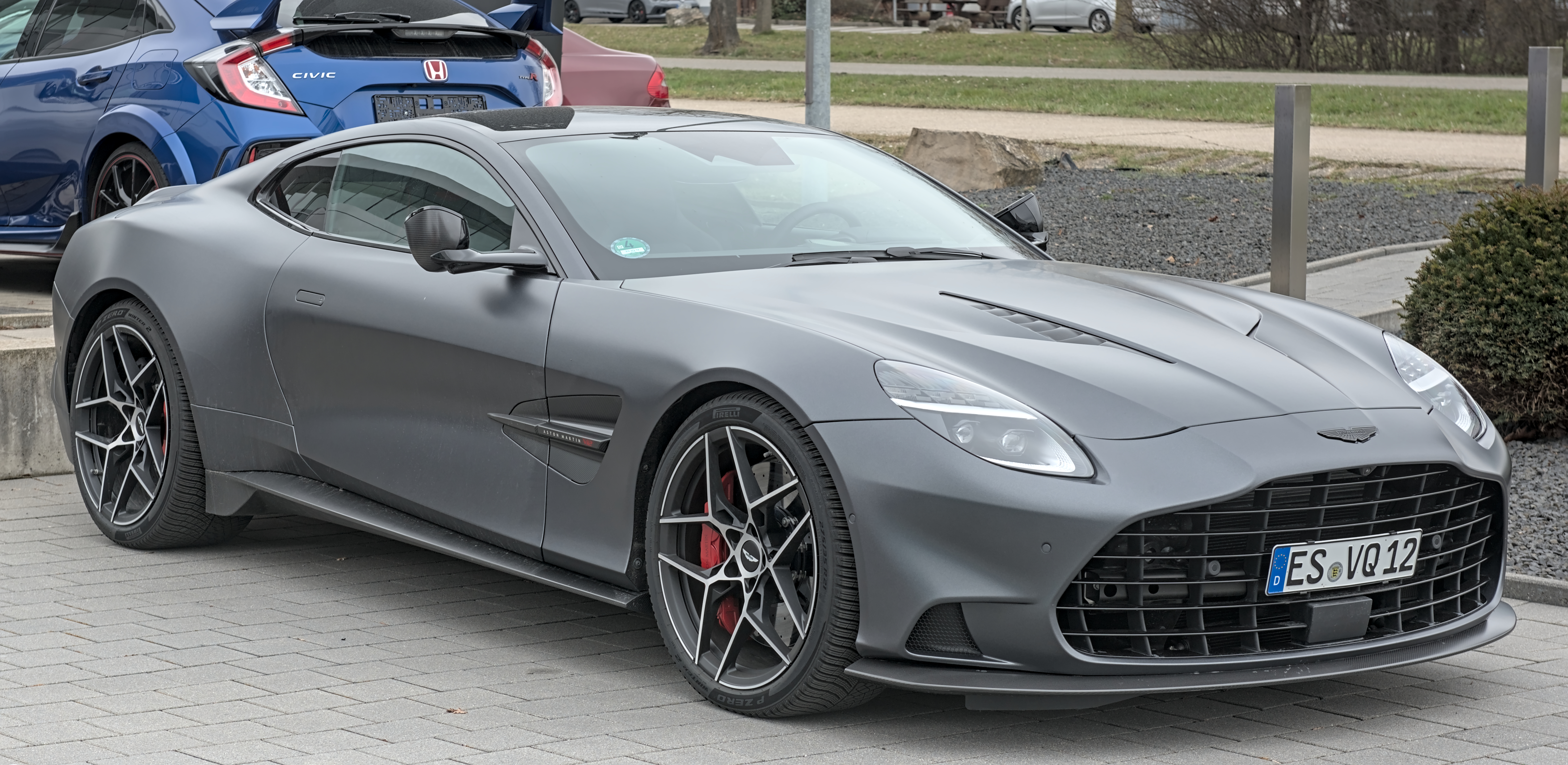
  Aston Martin Vanquish (2024)
  Established in 1913, its headquarters is in Gaydon, Warwickshire. In 2018 it was listed on the London Stock Exchange by an initial public offering.
- Astra Films – was a film production and distribution company. Its headquarters was in Leeds, Yorkshire.
- AstraZeneca – is a UK-Swedish multinational pharmaceutical and biopharmaceutical company. Established in 1999, its headquarters is in Cambridge. It was formed by the merger of Astra AB and Zeneca. Its 2022 revenue was $44.3 billion, with a net income of $3.2 billion.
- Atom Bank plc – is an online bank offering savings, mortgages, and loans. Headquartered in Durham, County Durham; it was founded in 2013 by Anthony Thomson and Mark Mullen.
- Auction Technology Group plc – is a company that operates the digital marketplaces the-saleroom.com which presents auctions, and ibidder.com that presents industrial equipment auctions. It also publishes Antiques Trade Gazette in print and online.
  Auction Technology Group logo
  It is headquartered in London. It was founded in 1971 by Ivor Turnball who created the Antiques Trade Gazette. In 2016 it changed its name from ATG Media to Auction Technology Group. In 2022 its revenue was £119 million, with a net income loss of £6 million.
- Aunt Bessies – is a producer of frozen food products including Yorkshire puddings, potato products, meal accompaniments, ready meals, vegetables, and desserts. It is based in Hull and Leeds. It was founded in 1995 by the William Jackson Food Group as Tryton Foods before being renamed Aunt Bessies. In 2018 it was acquired by Nomad Foods.
- Aura Films – is a film production company. Established in 2011, its headquarters is in Colchester, Essex.
- Ausfod Motor Engineering Co Ltd – was an automobile manufacturer from 1947 to 1948. Its headquarters was in Chorlton-on-Medlock, Manchester.
- Austin Motor Company – was a manufacturer of automobiles, and wartime manufacturer of aircraft, shells, heavy guns and military vehicles from 1905 to 1952.
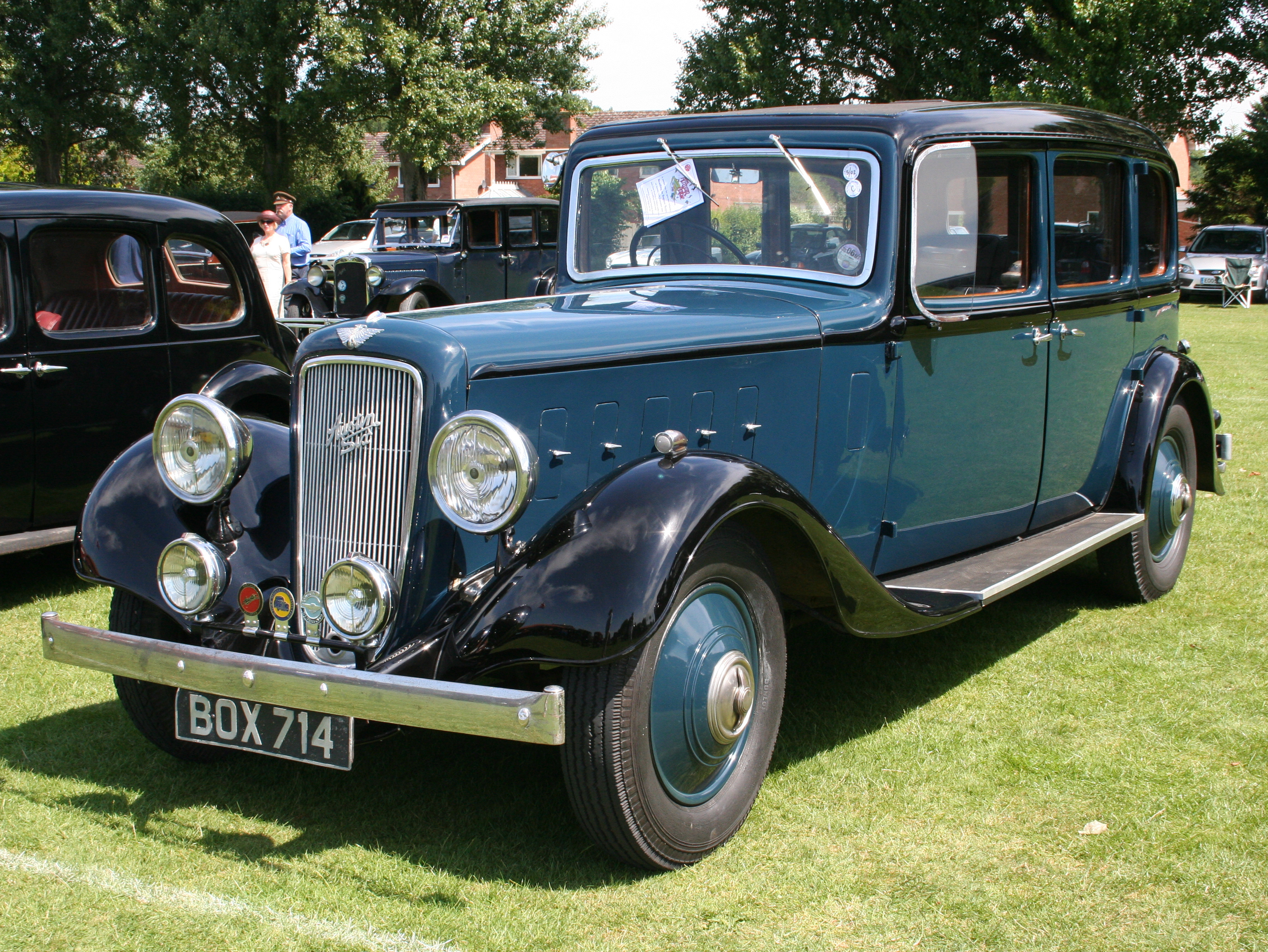
  1936 Austin 20 Mayfair saloon
  Its headquarters was in Longbridge, Birmingham. In 1952 it merged with Morris Motors to become the British Motor Corporation.
- Austin Rover Group – was an automobile manufacturer from 1982 to 1989. Headquartered in Longbridge, Birmingham, it was a subsidiary of British Leyland. In 1989 it became Rover Group.
- Austin-Healey – was an automobile manufacturer from 1952 to 1972. It was established as a joint venture between British Motor Corporation and Donald Healey Motor Company.
- Autotrader Group – is an automotive online marketplace and classified advertising company headquartered in Manchester. It was founded in 1975 by John Madejski, Paul Gibbons, and Peter Taylor as the publisher of the magazine Thames Valley Trader. In 1988 it was rebranded as Auto Trader. The online marketplace was launched in 1996. In 2022 its revenue was £432 million, with a net income of £244 million.
- Auto-Sleepers – is a camper van motor homes manufacturer.
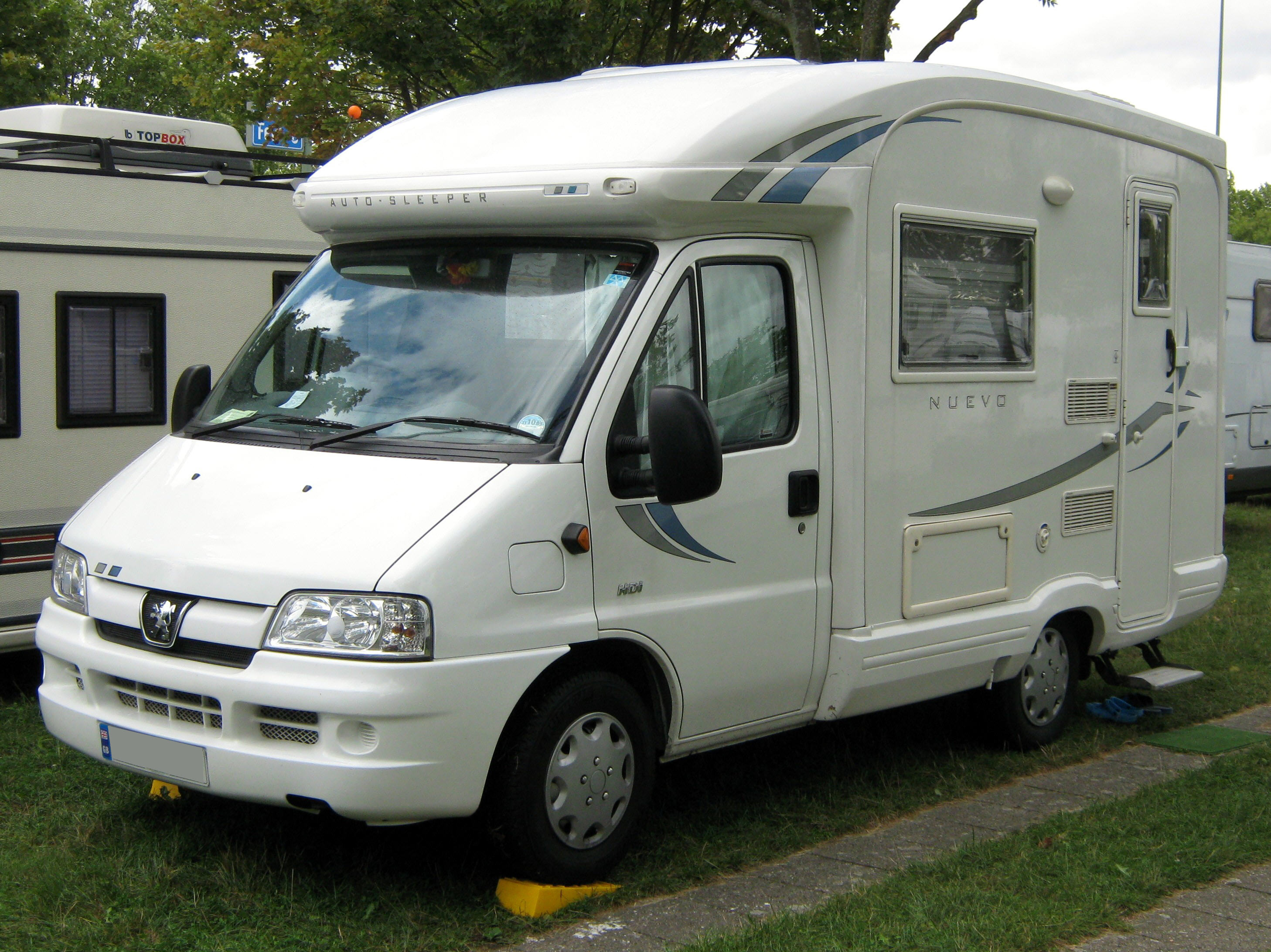
  Auto Sleeper Nuevo RV 2009
  Established in 1961, its headquarters is in Willersey, Gloucestershire.
- Avalon Entertainment – is a talent management, television production, and promotion group headquartered in London. Its television production companies are Avalon Television, Flame Television, Liberty Bell Productions, Tinderbox Television, Topical Television, and Calamity Films. Avalon has produced programmes such as Harry Hill, Harry Hill's TV Burp, Not Going Out, Man Down, Taskmaster and Last Week Tonight with John Oliver.
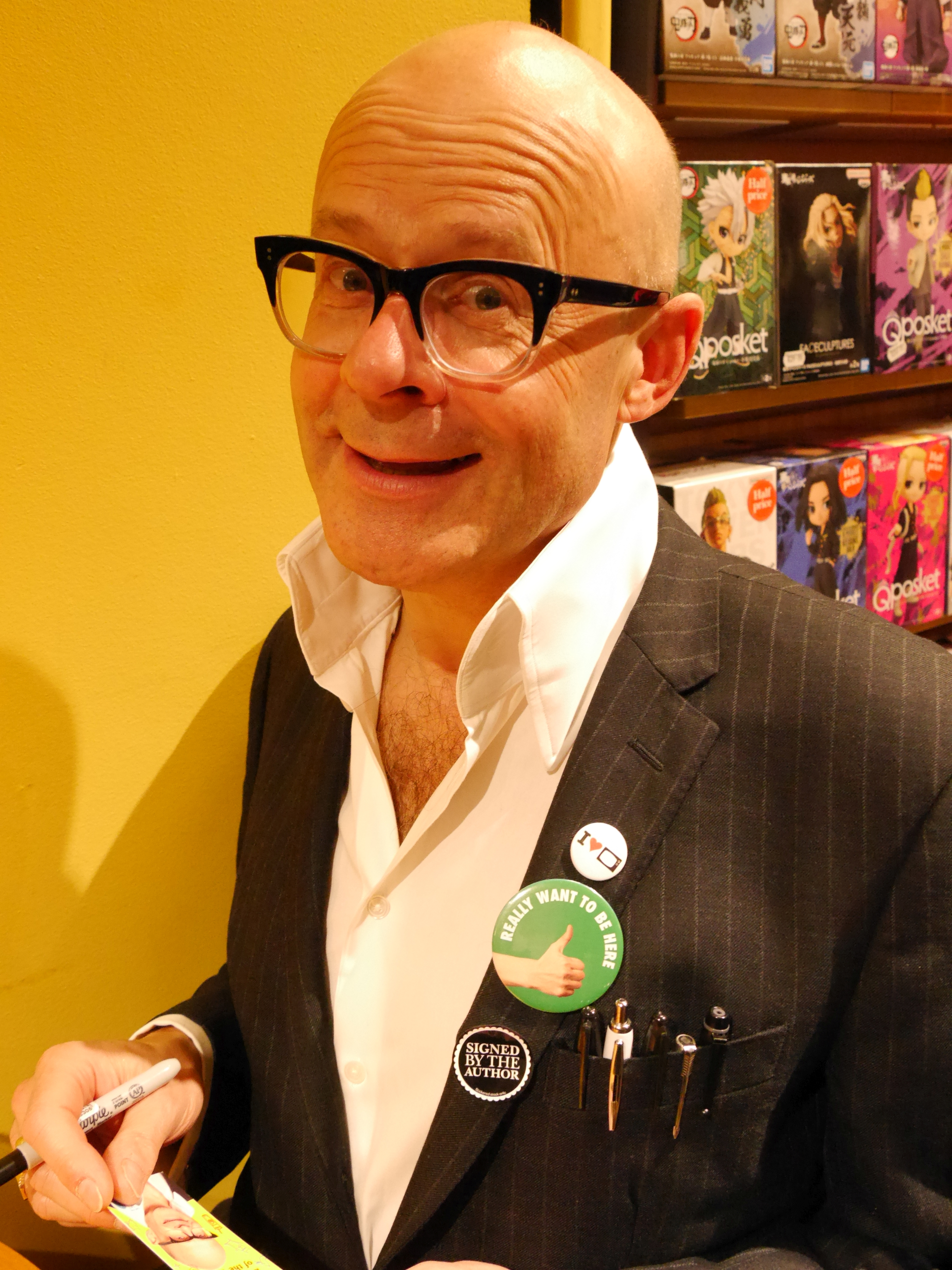
  Harry Hill who starred in Harry Hill, and Harry Hill's TV Burp
  Its entertainment talent agency companies are Avalon Management, ARG Talent, and The Agency. Avalon Promotions manages artist's events such as live shows and tours, theatre productions, and other promotions. Avalon Distribution is responsible for sales of programmes and formats. Avalon was founded in 1989 by Richard Allen-Turner and Jon Thoday.
- AVI Global Trust – is an investment trust headquartered in London. It was founded in 1889 as the Transvaal Mortgage Loan and Finance Company. It was renamed the British Empire Land, Mortgage and Loan Company in 1906, the British Empire Securities and General Trust in 1964, the British Empire Trust in 2015, and then AVI Global Trust in 2019. In 2023 it had £1.2 billion of assets under management.
- Aviva – is a British multinational insurance company.
  Aviva logo
  It was established in 2000 when Norwich Union merged with insurer CGU plc, its headquarters is in London.
- Avon Technologies – is a company that engineers and manufactures respiratory protection equipment for military, law enforcement, and fire personnel. It is headquartered in Melksham, Wiltshire. It was founded in 1885 to run Avon Mill which produced rubber goods. In 1890 it was relocated to Melksham and renamed The Avon India Rubber Company. In 1933 it was listed on the London Stock Exchange. It was renamed Avon Rubber in 1963, then Avon Protection in 1987 before renaming to Avon Technologies in 2024.
- Axon Automotive – was an automobile and components manufacturer that operated from 2005 to 2020. Its headquarters was in Northampton, Northamptonshire.
- Aylesbury and Buckingham Railway – was a railway company established in 1860 that operated from 1868 to 1891.
- Ayr and Dalmellington Railway – was a railway company established in 1853 that operated from 1856 to 1858.
- Ayr and Maybole Junction Railway – was a railway company established in 1854 that operated from 1856 to 1871.
- Ayrshire and Wigtownshire Railway – was a railway company established in 1887 to take over the Girvan and Portpatrick Junction Railway. It operated from 1887 to 1892 when the line was absorbed into the Glasgow and South Western Railway.

== B ==
- B&M Retail (trading as B&M) – is a variety store chain including B&M Bargains, and B&M Homestore. Established in 1978 as Billington & Mayman, its headquarters are in Speke, Liverpool.
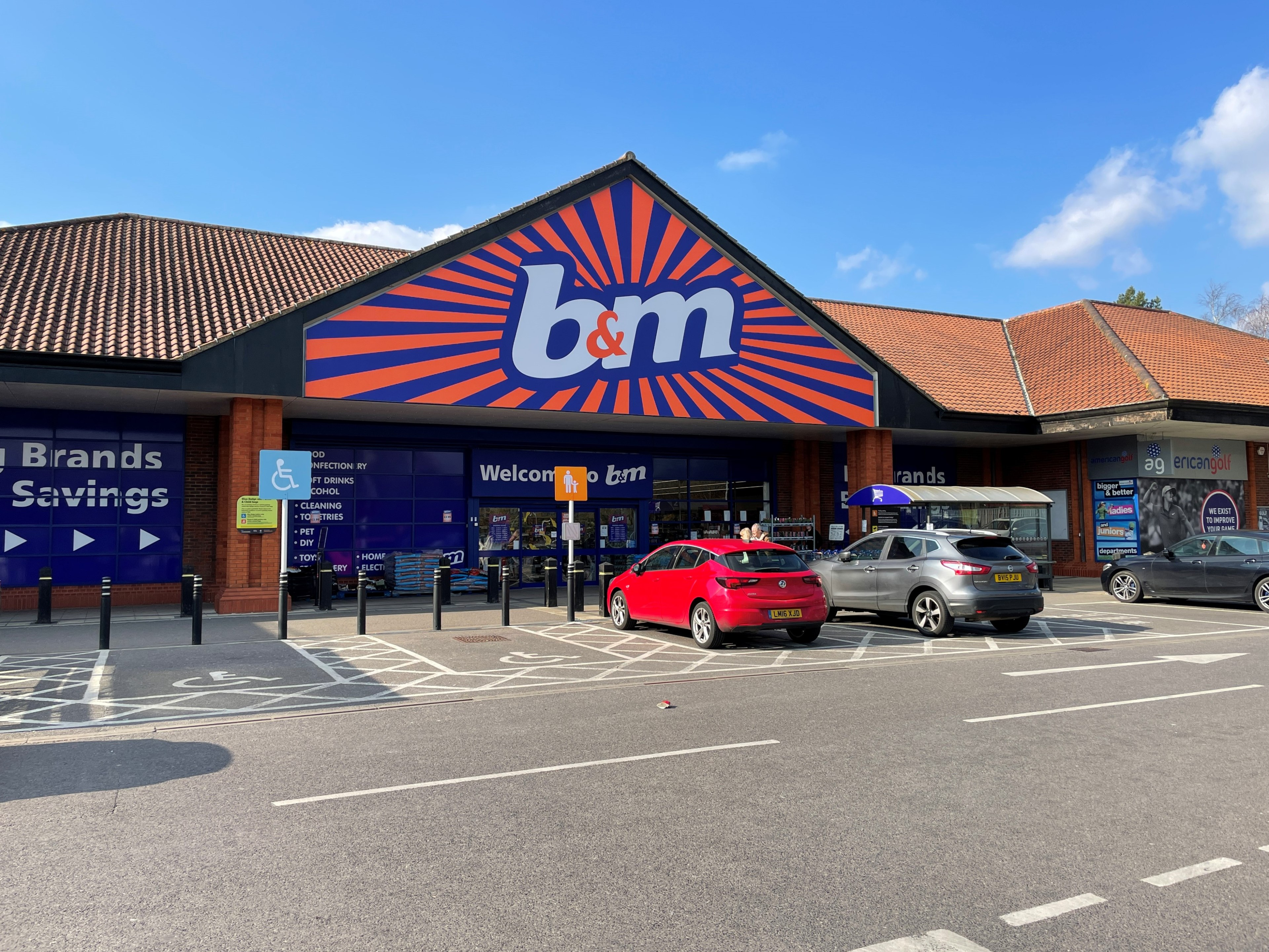
  B&M store in Kempshott, Hampshire
  It has 787 stores in the UK as of 2025. Heron Foods is its subsidiary company. It is part of the Jersey-based B&M European Value Retail S.A.
- B&Q Ltd – is a company that operates a retail store chain and retail website offering DIY and home improvement products, fitted kitchens and bathrooms, gardening supplies, and plants. It is headquartered in Eastleigh, Hampshire.
  B&Q logo
  It is named after its founders Richard Block and David Quayle who started the business in 1969. In 1980 it was acquired by the F. W. Woolworth Company. In 1982 the English subsidiary Woolworths including B&Q was acquired by Paternoster which became Kingfisher plc and remains the owner of B&Q. In 2026 it ran 318 stores.
- Babcock International Group plc – is a defence and engineering company headquartered in London. Its contracts include ship building and maintenance for the Royal Navy, and decommissioning nuclear power stations.
  Babcock logo
  It was founded in 1891 as Babcock & Wilcox Ltd by the US company Babcock & Wilcox Company. Initially it was a steam boiler manufacturer but diversified and expanded into ship repair, defence equipment, development of nuclear power stations, materials handling, ship building, and business services. Its helicopter operations were disposed of in the 2020s. In 2026 its revenue was £5.1 billion, with a net income of £210 million.
- Baby Cow Productions – is a television, film, animation, podcast and radio production company specialising in comedy. Headquartered in London; it was founded in 1999 by Steve Coogan and Henry Normal.
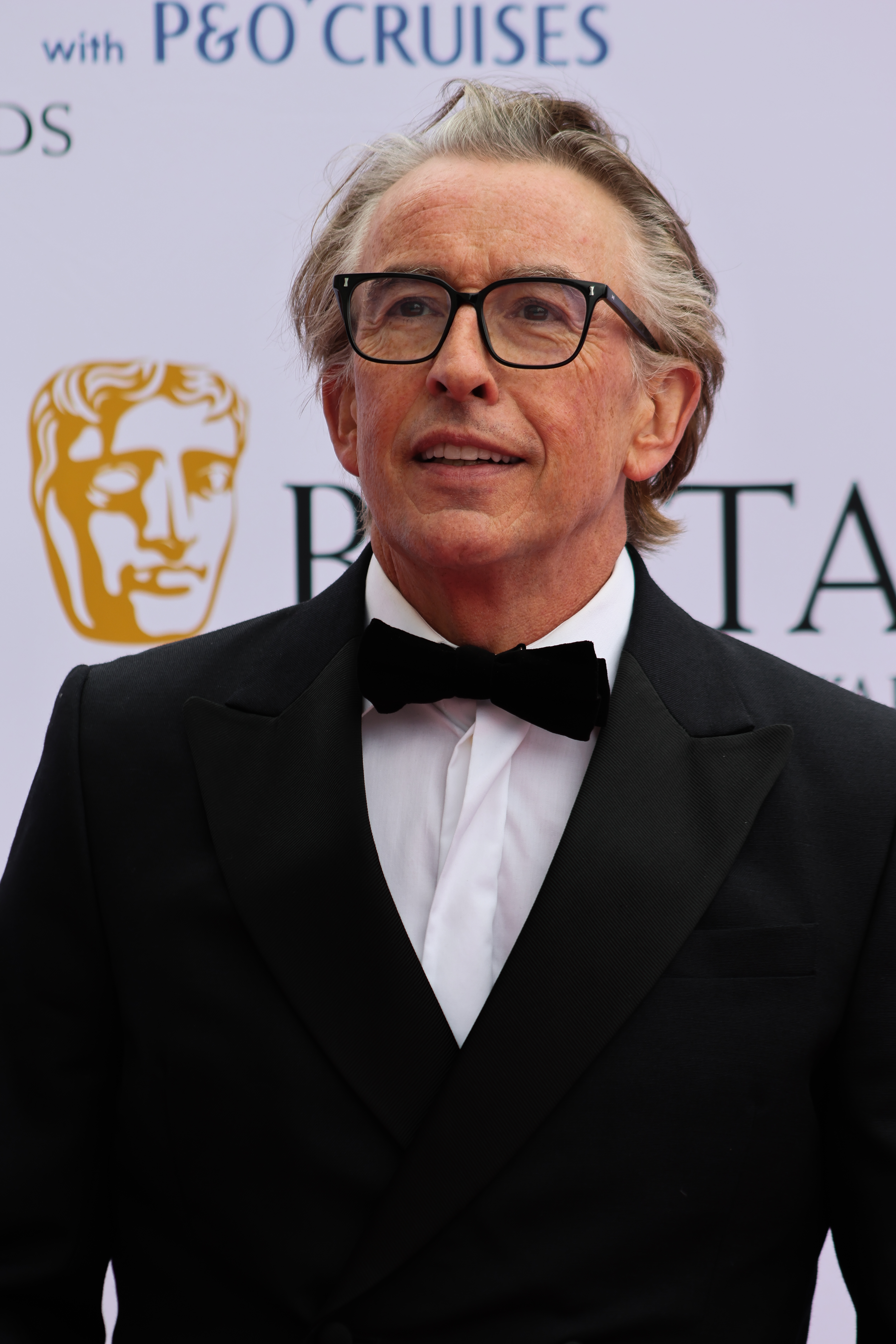
  Steve Coogan is the co-founder and creative director of Baby Cow Productions
  Its productions include: How Are You? It's Alan (Partridge), Gavin and Stacey, Philomena, Changing Ends, The Trip, Alan Partridge: Alpha Papa and The Mighty Boosh. It is owned by BBC Studios.
- Bad Wolf – is a television production company based in Cardiff, Wales. It was founded in 2015 by Julie Gardner and Jane Tranter. Its programmes include His Dark Materials, The Night Of, A Discovery of Witches, Doctor Who (2023–2025), Industry, and Red Eye. In 2017 it received investment from Sky Group and HBO in return for minority stakes in the company. In 2021 it was acquired by Sony Pictures Television.
- BAE Systems – is a British multinational defence, security, and aerospace company producing civil and military aircraft, defence electronics, naval vessels, munitions, and land warfare systems.
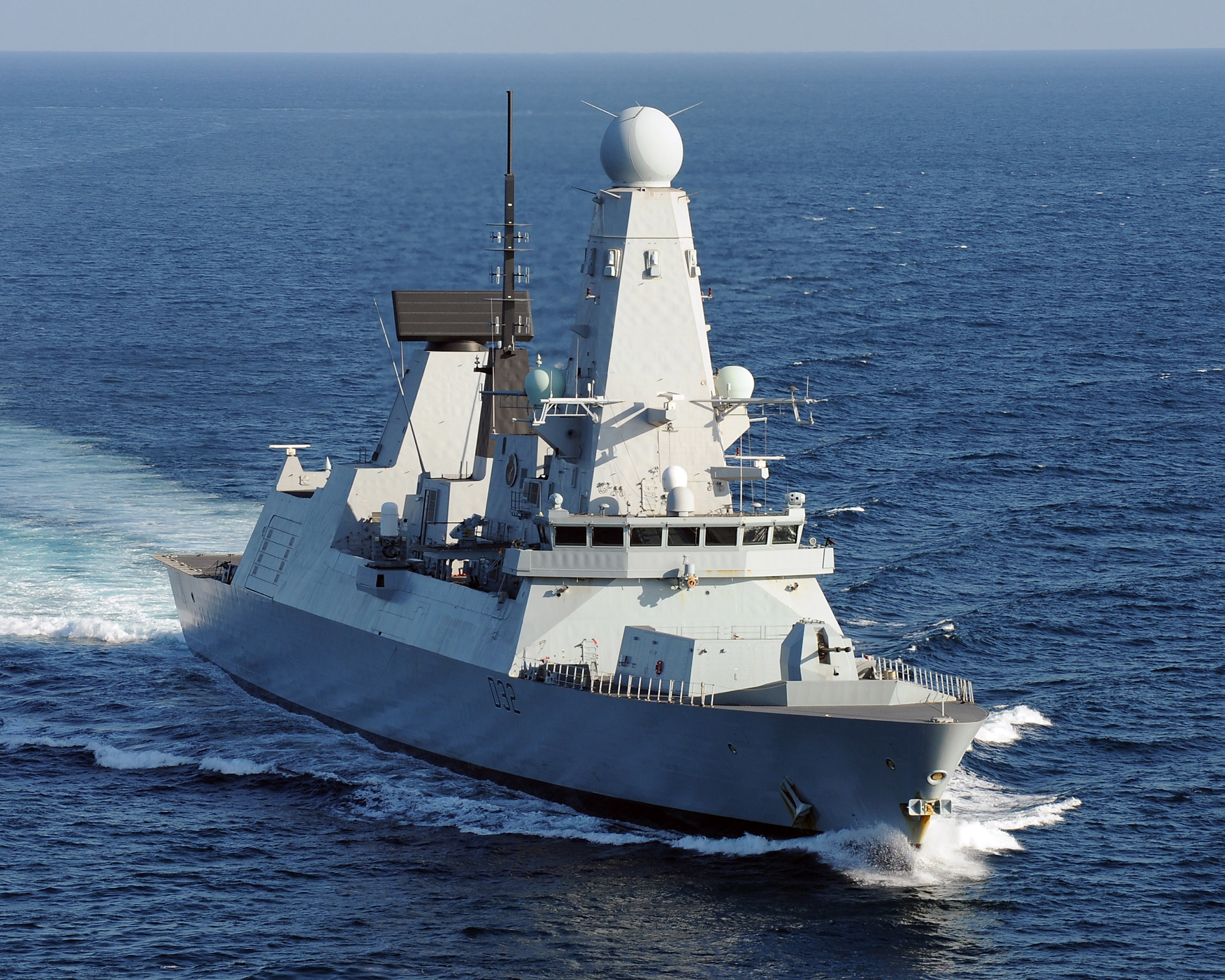
  HMS Daring, a Royal Navy Type 45 Destroyer built by BAE Systems
  Established in 1999, its headquarters are in London, and Farnborough, Hampshire. It was formed from the merger of British Aerospace and Marconi Electronic Systems. In 2022 its revenue was £21.2 billion, with a net income of £1.6 billion.
- BAE Systems Digital Intelligence – is an international cyber security and cyber intelligence company. Established in 1971, its headquarters is in Guildford, Surrey. It was formally known as Smith Associates, Detica, and BAE Systems Applied Intelligence. Its parent company is BAE Systems.
- Baillie Gifford & Co – is an investment management company. Established in 1908, its headquarters is in Edinburgh, Scotland. It manages 9 investment trusts. In 2025 its assets under management were valued at £286.3 billion.
- Baillie Gifford European Growth Trust – is an investment trust company headquartered in Edinburgh. It was founded in 1972 by F&C Asset Management as the Foreign & Colonial Eurotrust. In 2010 Edinburgh Partners became the managers and renamed it the European Investment Trust. In 2019 Baillie Gifford took over the management and renamed it Baillie Gifford European Growth Trust.
- Baillie Gifford Japan Trust plc – is an investment trust company focused on Japanese companies. It is headquartered in Edinburgh and managed by Baillie Gifford & Co. It was founded in 1981.
- Baillie Gifford Shin Nippon – is an investment trust company focused on Japanese smaller companies. Headquartered in Edinburgh; it was founded in 1985. It is managed by Baillie Gifford.
- Baillie Gifford US Growth Trust – is an investment trust company focused on US based companies. Headquartered in Edinburgh; it was founded in 2018. It is managed by Baillie Gifford.
- Baker Street and Waterloo Railway – was a railway company established in 1891 to construct and underground electric railway in London. It was taken over by the Underground Electric Railways Company of London in 1902 and opened in 1906 between Baker Street and Elephant and Castle. It now forms a part of the London Underground's Bakerloo line.
- Balfour Beatty plc – is an international infrastructure company providing construction services, support services, and infrastructure investments in the public and private sectors. It is headquartered in London.
  Balfour Beatty logo
  It was founded in 1909 by George Balfour and Andrew Beatty as a tramway constructor. It expanded into electric power infrastructure, tram services, and bus services. The tram and bus operations were divested later. It also built power stations, rail workings, and housing. In 1969 it was acquired by cable manufacturer BICC. Its homes division was sold to Westbury in 1995. BICC divested its cable business and was renamed Balfour Beatty in 2000. It made a number of acquisitions in the UK, US, and Canada. In 2026 it employed 26,000 people.
- Ballochney Railway – was a railway company established in 1826 that operated from 1827 to 1848.
- Bamforth & Co Ltd – was a film production, and postcards publishing company. Established in 1870 in Holmfirth, Yorkshire, its headquarters was in Leeds, Yorkshire.
- Banff, Macduff and Turriff Junction Railway – was a railway company established in 1855 that operated from 1857 to 1866.
- Banff, Portsoy and Strathisla Railway – was a railway company established in 1857 that operated from 1859 to 1867.
- Banijay Entertainment – is a British multinational television production and distribution company headquartered in London. It is equally owned by Banijay Group and RedBird IMI (a joint-venture between RedBird Capital Partners and Emerati company International Media Investments). It was founded in July 2026 by the merger of Banijay's television production, distribution, and live events business with All3Media.
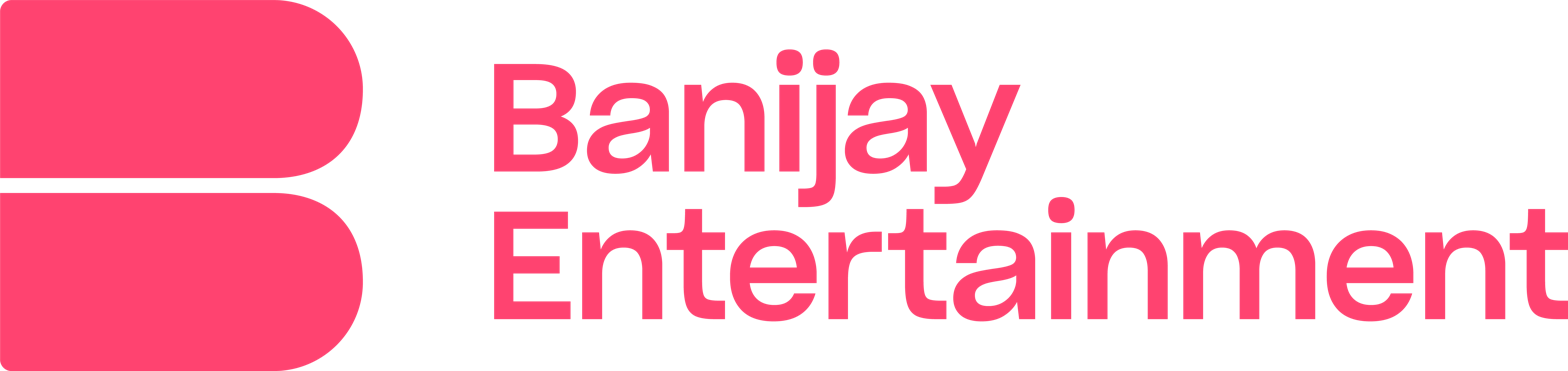
  Banijay Entertainment logo
  Prior to the merger Banijay had more than 130 television production and creative business subsidiaries over 25 territories while All3Media had 45 television production subsidiaries. As from the merger Banijay Entertainment has a programme library of more than 265,000 hours of content. Its parent company is Banijay Group.
- Bank of Scotland – is a financial services company providing banking, insurance, and banknote production. Established in 1695, its headquarters is at The Mound, Edinburgh, Scotland.
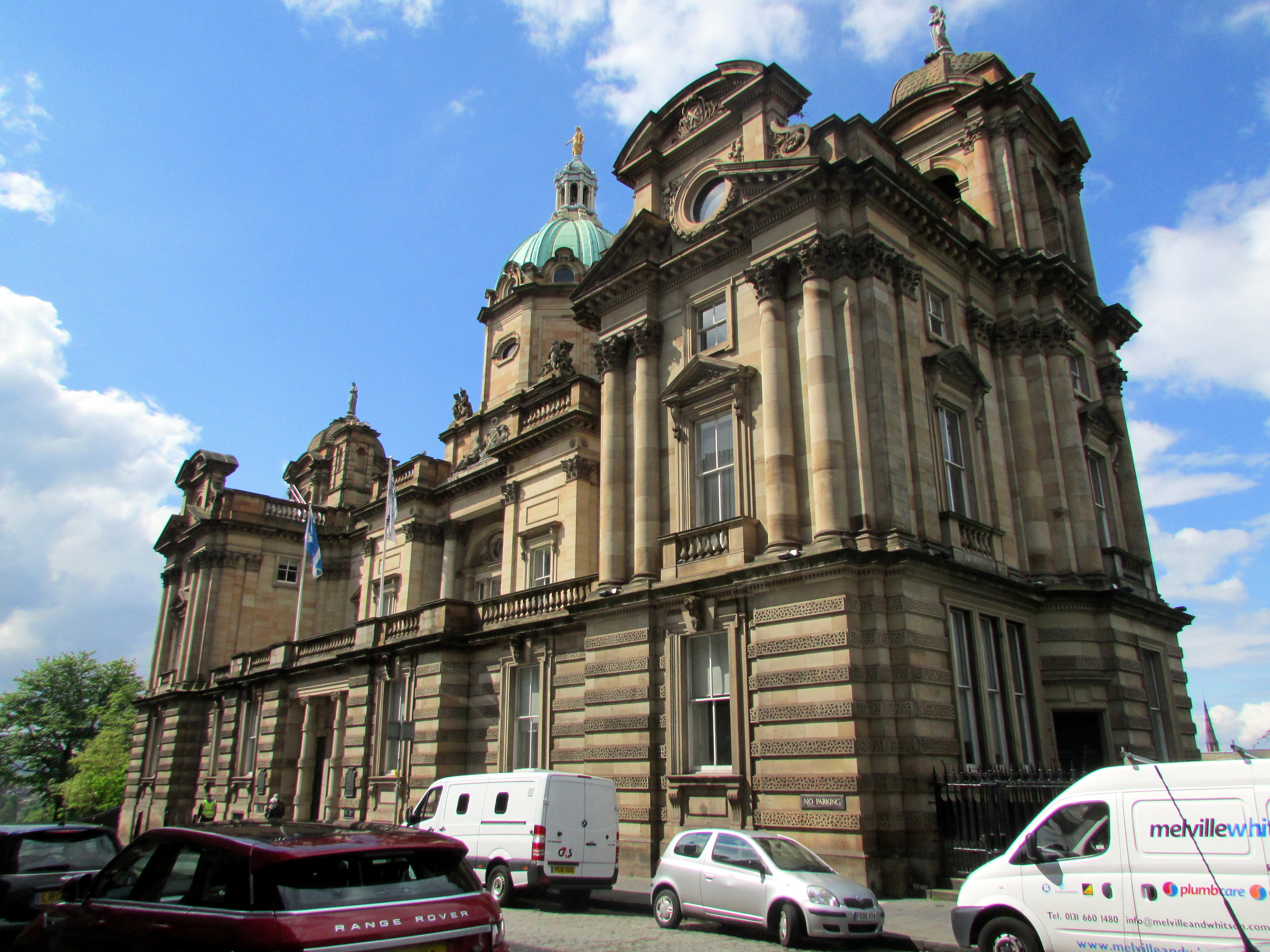
  Bank of Scotland headquarters at The Mound, Edinburgh
  It was previously part of HBOS. Its parent company is Lloyds Banking Group.
- Bank of Wales (Welsh: Banc Cymru) – was a commercial bank offering financial services to small and medium-sized businesses in Wales. Headquartered in Cardiff, Wales; it was founded in 1971 by Sir Julian Hodge as Commercial Bank of Wales (Welsh:Banc Masnachol Cymru) . In 1986 it was acquired by Bank of Scotland plc and has ceased trading as a separate entity.
- Bankers Investment Trust – is an investment trust company focused on major international companies. Headquartered in London; it was founded in 1888. It was listed on the London Stock Exchange in 1957. It is managed by Janus Henderson.
- Banks Group – is a mining, energy, and property development company. Established in 1976, its headquarters is in Durham.
- Bannatyne Fitness Ltd (trading as Bannatyne) – is a company that operates a chain of 69 health clubs, 43 spas, and three hotels. Headquartered in Darlington, County Durham; it was founded in 1997 by Duncan Bannatyne.
- Barclays plc – is a financial services company with five divisions: the UK consumer bank, UK corporate bank, private bank and wealth management, investment bank, and the US consumer bank.
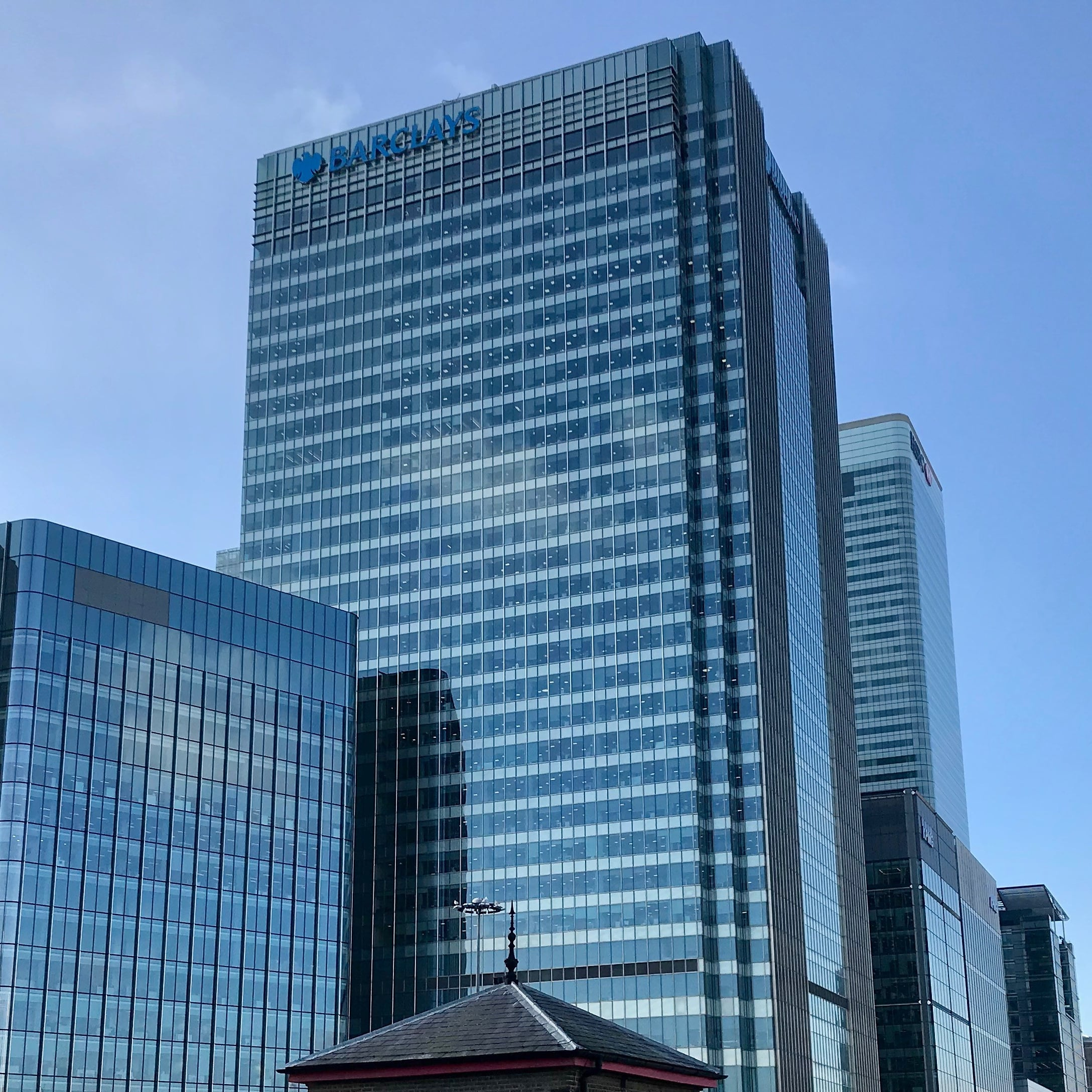
  Barclays headquarters One Churchill Place, London
  Headquartered in London; its origins were in a goldsmith banking business in the City of London in which James Barclay became a partner in 1736. In 1896 12 UK banks united as a joint-stock bank under the name Barclays and Co. and over the next decades expanded into a nationwide bank. It has made many acquisitions such as: London, Provincial and South Western Bank in 1918, British Linen Bank in 1919, Mercantile Credit in 1975, The Woolwich in 2000, and the North American operations of Lehmann Brothers in 2008. It has a primary listing on the London Stock Exchange and a secondary listing on the New York Stock Exchange. In 2026 Barclays was Europe's fifth largest bank by assets, with $2.078 trillion in assets.
- Barratt Redrow (formerly Barratt Developments) – is a residential property development company headquartered in Coalville, North West Leicestershire. It was founded in 1958 by Lawrie Barratt and Lewis Greensit as Greensit Brothers, located in Newcastle upon Tyne. In 1973 it was renamed Barratt Developments.
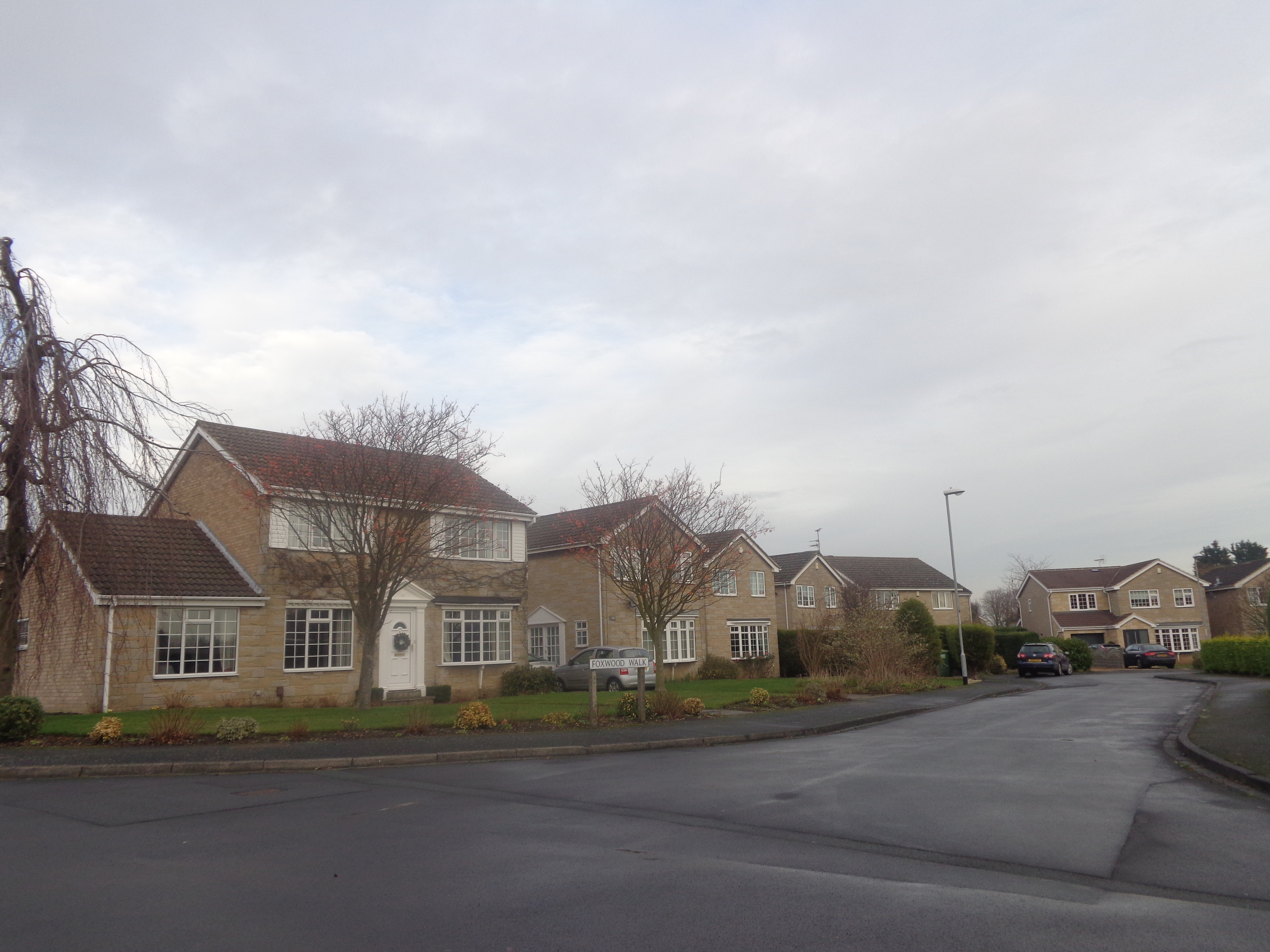
  Barratt housing from the 1970s
  Its acquisitions include Arthur Wardle, Janes, Wilson Bowden, and Oregon Timber Frame. Its brands include Barratt Homes, David Wilson Homes, Barratt London, and Wilson Bowden Developments. In 2024 it acquired rival homebuilder Redrow and was renamed Barratt Redrow.
- Bath Investment & Building Society (trading as Bath Building Society) – is a building society offering mortgages and savings. It is headquartered in Bath, Somerset. It was founded in 1904 as a friendly society.
- Bayswater, Paddington and Holborn Bridge Railway – was a railway company established in 1853 to build an underground railway in London. After a name change to the Northern Metropolitan Railway it became the Metropolitan Railway in 1854.
- BBC (British Broadcasting Corporation) – is a public service broadcasting statutory corporation that produces and broadcasts television and radio programming and provides online services.
  BBC logo
  Established in 1922, its headquarters is at Broadcasting House, London. It was first formed as the British Broadcasting Company.
- BBC Film – is a film production company. Established in 1990, its headquarters is in London. Its parent company is the BBC.
- BBC Studios – is a television production and distribution company. Established in 2015, its headquarters is at Television Centre, London.
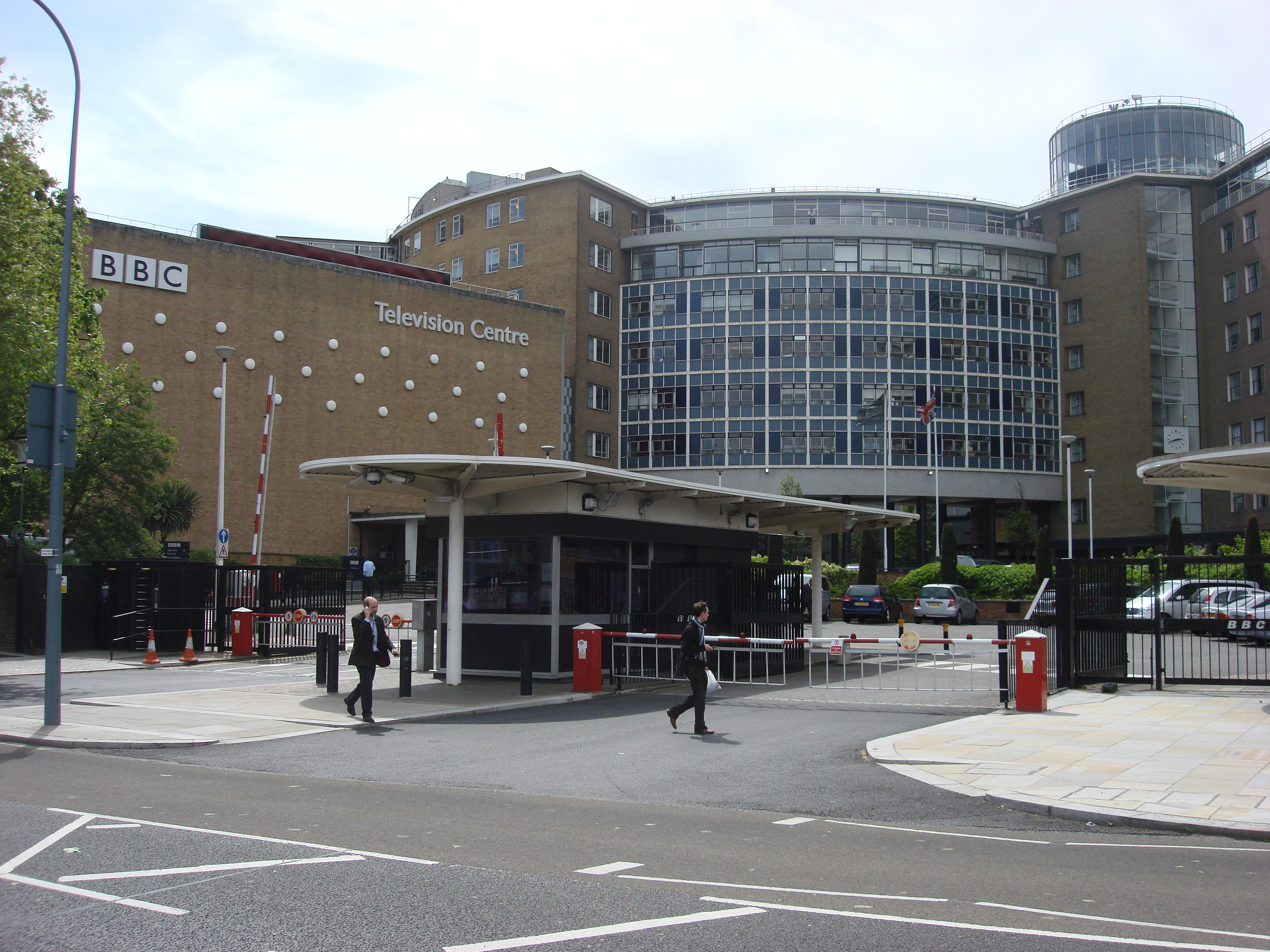
  Television Centre at White City, West London - headquarters of the BBC from 1960 to 2013. The complex is now the home of BBC Studios and BBC Studioworks.
  In 2018 it subsumed BBC Worldwide. Its parent company is the BBC.
- BBC Studioworks – is a television studios, post-production, and related services company. Established in 1998, its headquarters is in London. Formerly known as BBC Resources Limited, and BBC Studios and Post Production Limited, its parent company is the BBC.
- Beauford Cars Ltd – was a car kit manufacturing company. Established in Up Holland, its headquarters was in Stoke-on-Trent. It was dissolved in 2025.
- Beazer Group – was an international house building, construction, and building materials company. It was headquartered in Bath, Somerset. It was founded and owned by the Beazer family for six generations. C.H. Beazer was incorporated in 1956. It was floated on the London Stock Exchange in 1973 as C.H. Beazer (Holdings). Its acquisitions included Mortimer & Sons, R.M. Smith, Monsell Youell, Second City Properties, M.P. Kent, Westbrick, F. Pratten and Co Ltd, William Leech, Cohn Communities, French Kier, Gifford Hill, and Koppers. Beazer Europe was floated off and the USA operations became a separate business as Beazer Homes USA. Beazer was acquired by Hanson in 1991 who floated a new Beazer Group consisting solely of the UK house building business in 1994. It acquired Charles Church Developments in 1996. Beazer Group was acquired by Persimmon plc in 2001.
- Beazley – is a specialist insurance company headquartered in London. It manages seven Lloyd's of London syndicates.
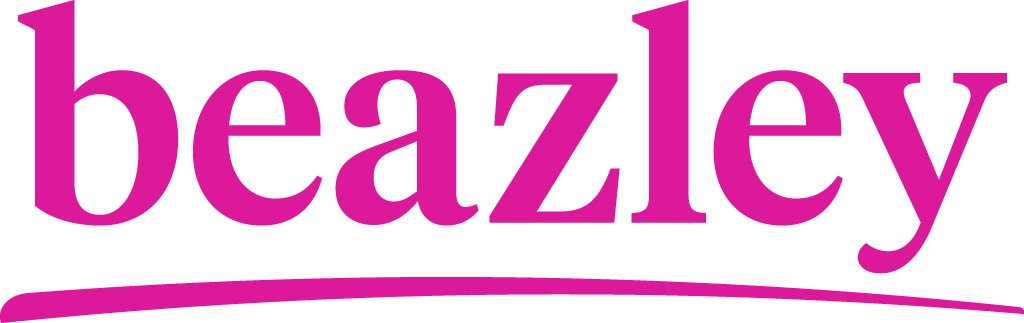
  Beazley logo
  In 2026 it was acquired by Zurich Insurance Group.
- Bedford Colliery – was a coal mine that operated from circa 1874 to 1929. Located in Bedford, Leigh, it became part of Manchester Collieries.
- Bedlam Productions – is a film and TV production company. Established in 2009, its headquarters is in London.
- Beecham Group – was a manufacturing company producing pharmaceuticals, drinks, toothpaste, and men's grooming products from 1859 to 1989. Its headquarters was in London. In 1989 Beecham Group and SmithKline Beckman merged to form SmithKline Beecham, and in 2000, they merged with GlaxoWellcome to form GlaxoSmithKline.
- Beefeater – was a licensed restaurant chain. Established in 1974, its headquarters was in Dunstable, Bedfordshire. Its parent company is Whitbread who, in 2026, announced the closure of all remaining restaurants (including Beefeater, Brewers Fayre and Bar + Block). Many of the restaurants are to be converted into Premier Inn hotel rooms with some becoming internal hotel restaurants.
- Bellerby & Co, Globemakers – is a manufacturer of bespoke handmade globes. It is headquartered in Stoke Newington, London. It was founded in 2008 by Peter Bellerby.
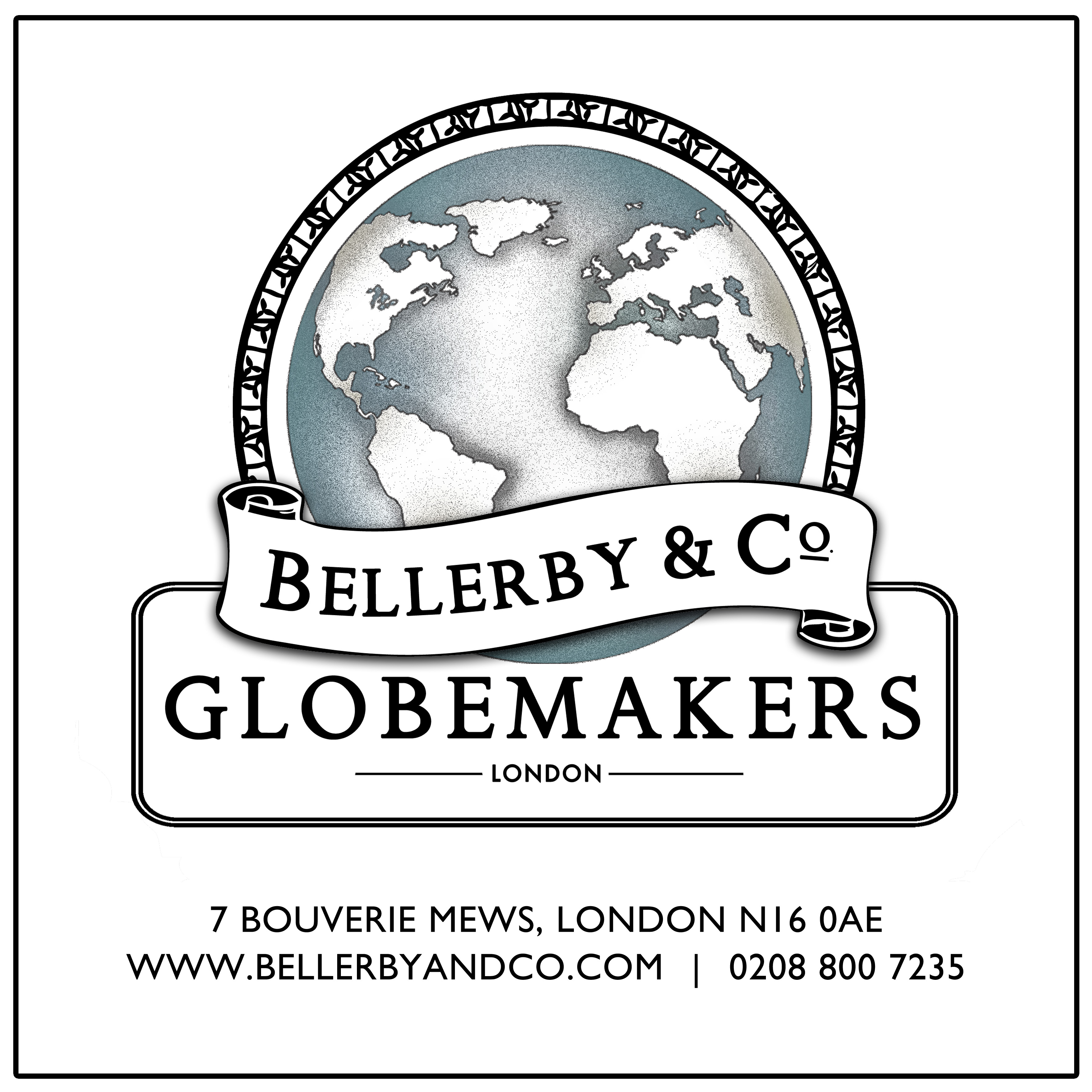
  Bellerby & Co. logo
- Bellway plc – is a residential property developer and housebuilder headquartered in Newcastle upon Tyne. It was founded in 1946 by John Thomas Bell and his sons as John T. Bell & Sons. In 2022 its revenue was £3.5 billion, with a net income of £242 million.
- Bell Pottinger – was a public relations, and advertising company that operated from 1988 to 2017. Its headquarters was in London.
- Be Military Fit (also known as BMF) – is a company that runs outdoor group fitness classes across the UK. It was founded in 1999 by Robin Cope, Harry Sowerby, and William Skinner as British Military Fitness. In 2018 it was acquired by NM Capital, and Bear Grylls Ventures and was renamed 'Be Military Fit'.
- Bentley – is an automobile manufacturing company producing luxury cars and racing cars. Established in 1919 in London, its headquarters is in Crewe.
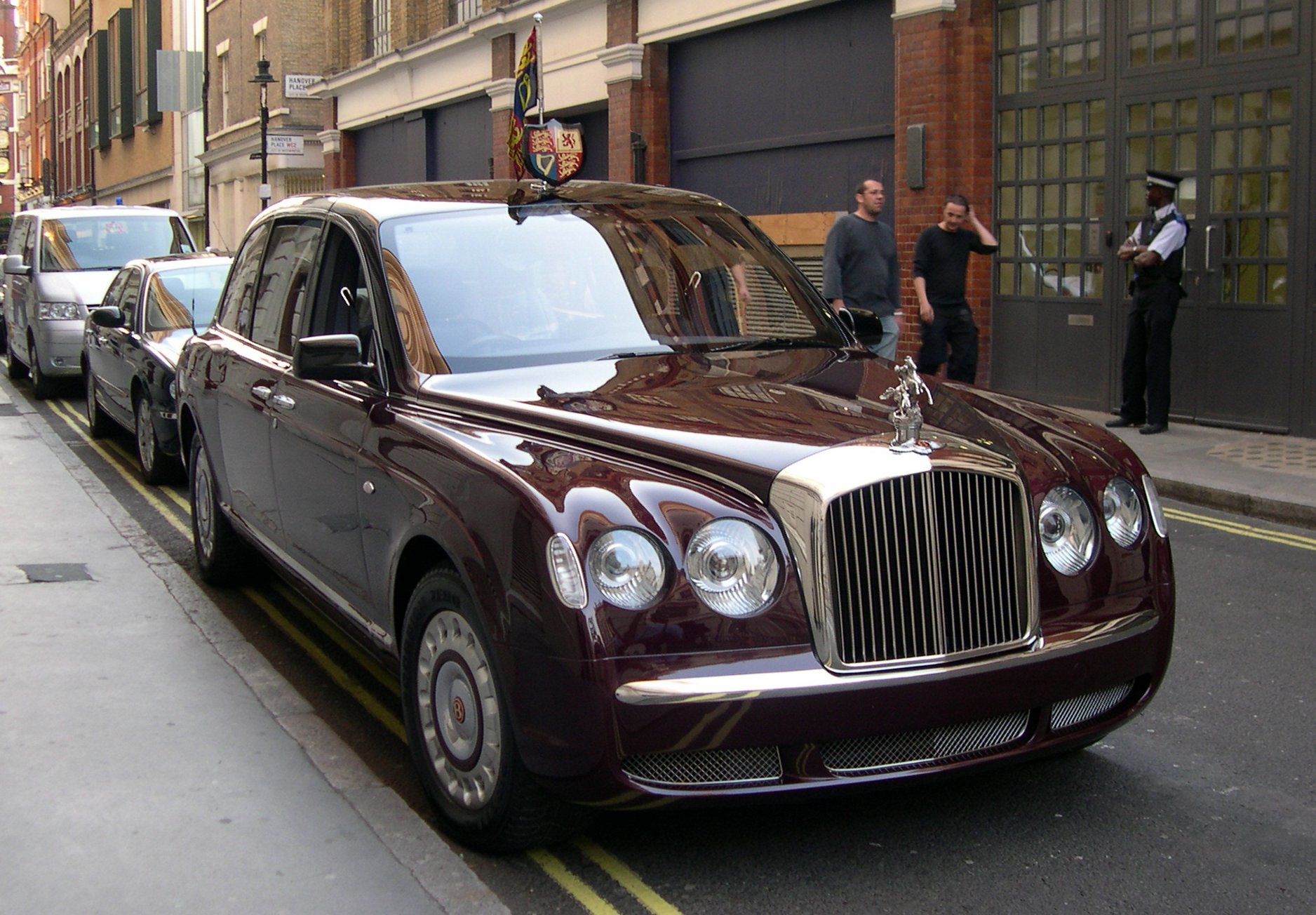
  2002 Bentley State Limousine owned by the late Queen Elizabeth II
  Between 1931 and 1970 it was owned by Rolls-Royce. In 1971 it was nationalised as part of Rolls-Royce Motors Limited. From 1980 to 1998 it was owned by Vickers. From 1998 it is owned by Volkswagen.
- Beowulf Mining – is a mining company. Established in 1978, it was formerly known as Beowulf Gold.
- Berkeley Group Holdings – is a property developer and house building company headquartered in Cobham, Surrey.
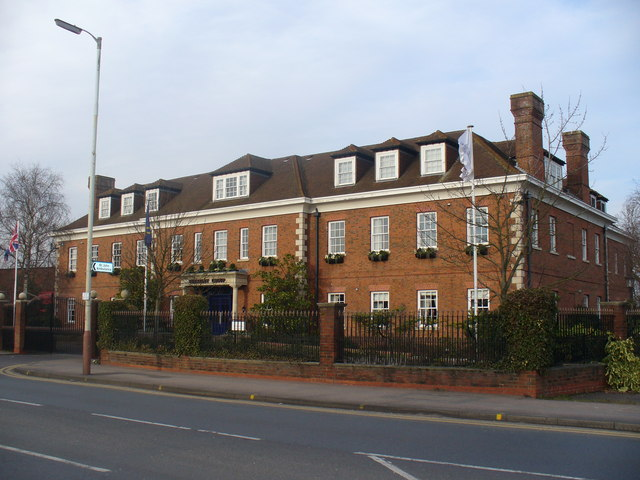
  Berkeley Group headquarters in Cobham, Surrey
  It was founded by Tony Pidgley and Jim Farrer in Weybridge, Surrey in 1976 as Berkeley Homes. In 2026 its revenue was £2.38 billion, with a net income of £318 million.
- bet365 – is an online gambling company. Established in 2000, its headquarters is in Stoke-on-Trent.
- Betable – is a gambling software, gambling and social gaming company. Established in 2008, its headquarters is in London.
- Betfair – is an online gambling company. Established in 2000, its headquarters is in London. It is owned by Flutter Entertainment.
- Betfred – is a gambling company. Established in 1967 in Salford, its headquarters is in Warrington.
- BetonSports – was an online gambling company. It operated from 1995 to 2006. Its headquarters was in London.
- Bettys and Taylors Group Ltd – is a producer of tea, coffee and other products, and operates a small chain of tea rooms. Headquartered in Harrogate, North Yorkshire, it was founded in 1962 when Bettys merged with Taylors of Harrogate.
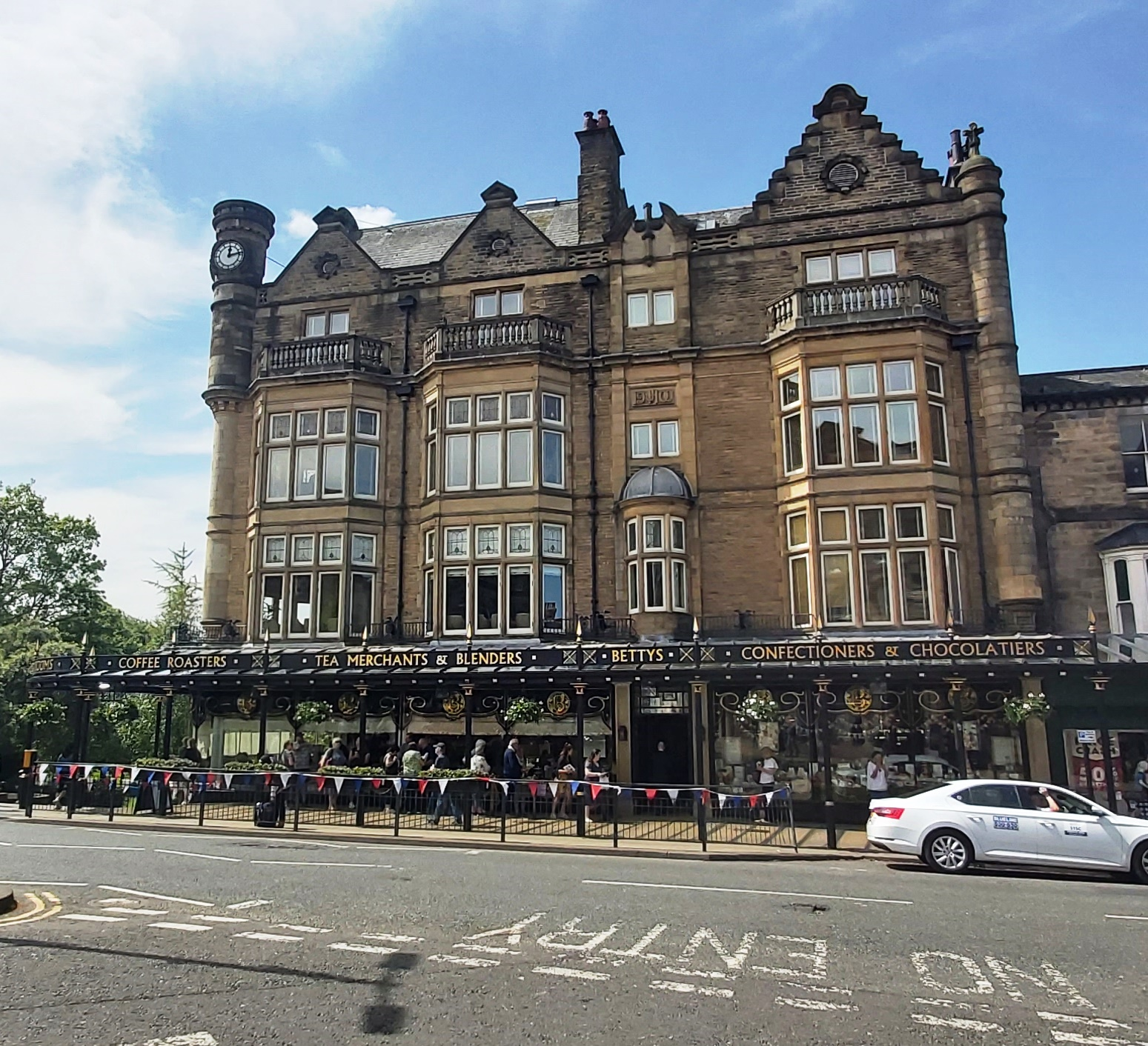
  Bettys Cafe Tea Rooms in Harrogate
  Its brands include Yorkshire Tea, Taylors Coffee, and Bettys Cafe Tea Rooms.
- Beverley Building Society – is a building society offering mortgages and savings. It is based in Beverley, East Riding of Yorkshire. It was founded in 1866.
- BFCS – was a commercials film production company that operated from 1966 to 2001. Headquartered in London, it was first named Brooks Baker Fulford.
- BH Macro – is an investment company focused on the global fixed income and foreign exchange markets. Founded in 2007, it is a feeder fund into a fund managed by Brevan Howard.
- BHP – is a multinational mining, metals, and petroleum company that was an Australian-British company until 2022 when it became solely Australian. Established in 1885, its headquarters is in Melbourne, Australia. It was formerly known as BHP Billiton.
- Big Talk Studios – is a film and TV production company. Established in 1994 by Nira Park; its headquarters is in London. In 2013 it was acquired by ITV Studios. Its films include Shaun of the Dead, Hot Fuzz, Attack the Block and Baby Driver. Its television programmes include Cold Feet, Mum, Raised by Wolves, Spaced and Black Books. In 2023 its name was changed from Big Talk Productions to Big Talk Studios.
- Big Yellow Group plc – is a self-storage company that operates storage sites in the UK, 19 of which use the name Armadillo Self Storage. It is headquartered in Bagshot, Surrey.
  Big Yellow Group logo
  It was founded in 1998 by Nicholas Vetch, Philip Burks, and James Gibson. In 2007 it was converted into a real estate investment trust. In 2022 its net income was £697 million.
- Biocompatibles – is a pharmaceutical manufacturer. Established in 1984, its headquarters is in Farnham, Surrey. In 2010 it was acquired by BTG plc which was acquired by Boston Scientific in 2019.
- Biopharma Credit – is an investment trust company focused on loan stock issued by life science companies. Headquartered in London; it was founded in 2017 and is managed by Pharmakon Advisors.
- Bio Products Laboratory – is a pharmaceuticals company producing human blood plasma products. Established in 1954 in Elstree. It was formerly part of the NHS; but is now owned by Permira and the Marcucci family who announced that its operations will be merged with Kedrion.
- Birmingham and Staffordshire Gas Light Company – was a gas production and supply company that operated from 1825 to 1875.
- Birmingham Gas Light and Coke Company – was a gas production and supply company that operated from 1819 to 1875.
- Birmingham Midshires – was a financial services company providing banking and insurance. It was formerly a building society founded in 1986 by the merger of the Birmingham and Bridgwater Building Society with the Midshires Building Society.
  Birmingham Midshires logo
  It has become a brand of Lloyds Banking Group.
- Bisichi Mining – is a mining and property corporation. Established in 1910, its headquarters is in London.
- Black Camel Pictures – is a film production company. Its headquarters is in Glasgow, Scotland.
- Black Horse – is a motor finance company headquartered in London. It was established in 1922 as UDT but since 2001 it is a subsidiary of Lloyds Banking Group.
- BlackRock Greater Europe Investment Trust plc – is an investment trust focused on European companies. It was founded in 2004 as The Merrill Lynch Greater Europe Investment Trust. It was given its current name in 2008 when BlackRock took over its management.
- BlackRock Smaller Companies Trust – is a British investment trust focused on investments in smaller companies. It is headquartered in London. It was established in 1906 as the North British Canadian Investment Company. It is managed by BlackRock. In 2026 the BlackRock Throgmorton Trust was merged into the company.
- BlackRock Throgmorton Trust – was an investment trust focused on investing in small and mid-sized companies. It was founded in 1962 as The Throgmorton Trust. In the 1980s it had a subsidiary named Capital for Industry which invested in consumer businesses. From 2008 the trust was managed by BlackRock. In 2026 it was merged into the BlackRock Smaller Companies Trust.
- BlackRock World Mining Trust plc – is an investment trust focused on mining and metals. It was founded in 1993 and is headquartered in London. It is managed by BlackRock.
- Blakeley's Productions – was a film production company. See Mancunian Films.
- Bleep – is an online record store company. Created by Warp Records, it was established in 2004.
- Blink – is a media production company creating television programmes and short films as well as content for advertising, and music videos.
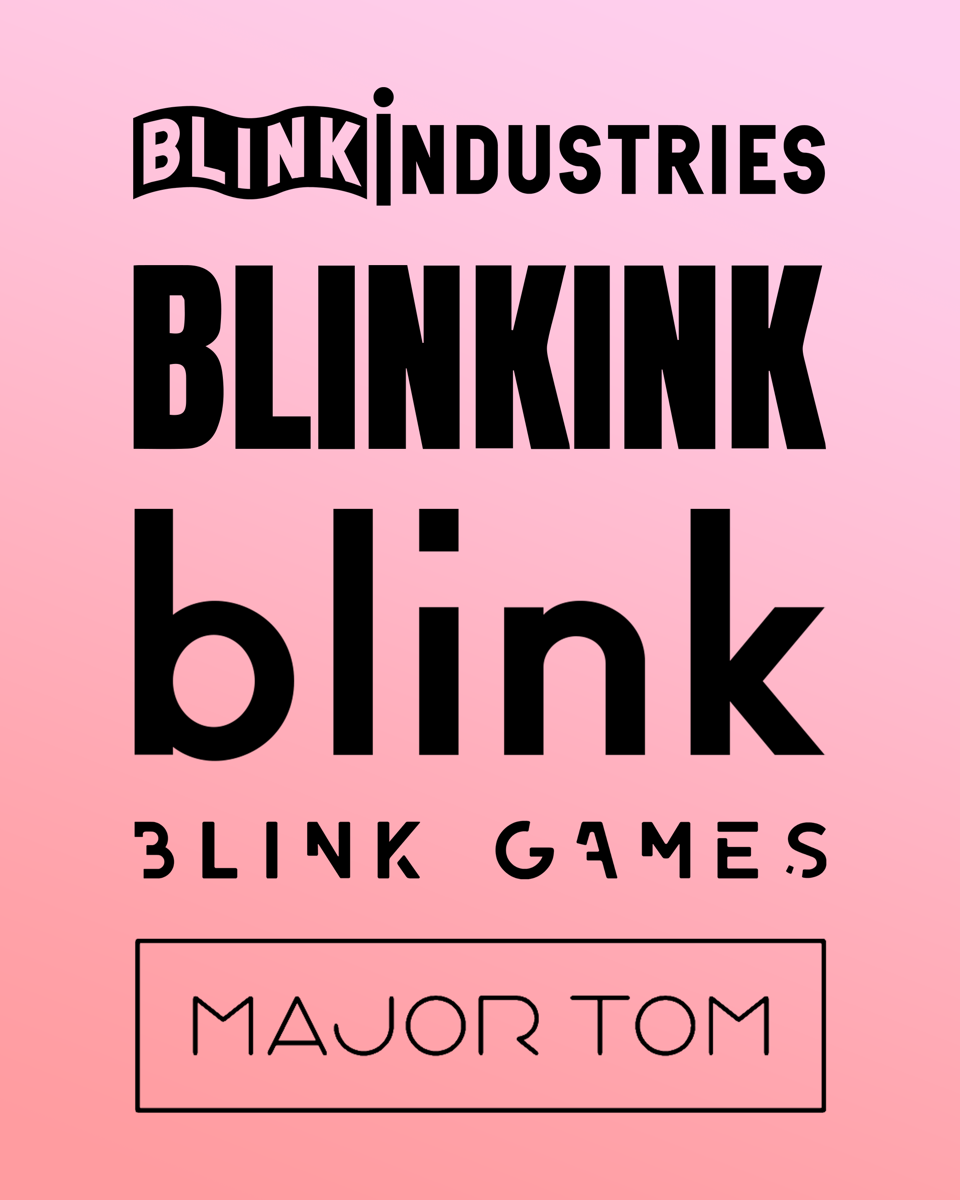
  Blink logos
  Established in 1985, its headquarters is in London.
- Bloomsbury Publishing – is a British worldwide publishing house of books, digital content and online resources. It was founded in 1986 by Nigel Newton and is headquartered in Bloomsbury, London.
- Bloor Homes – is a house building company headquartered in Measham, Leicestershire. It was founded in 1969 by John Bloor. Its parent company is Bloor Holdings.
- Blue Zoo Animation Studio – is an animation studio producing young children's television series. Headquartered in London; it has a studio in Fitzrovia, London and one in Brighton named Brighton Zoo - which is in partnership with Plug-in Media. Its programmes include: Alphablocks, Numberblocks, The Adventures of Paddington, Digby Dragon, Miffy's Adventures Big and Small and It's Pony.
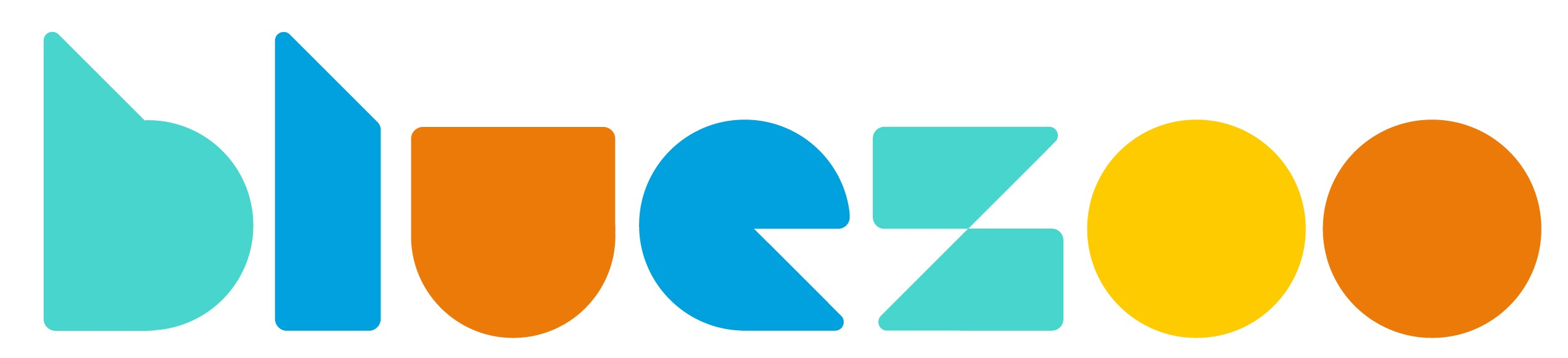
  Logo of Blue Zoo Animation Studio
  The company was founded in 2000 by Oli Hyatt, Adam Shaw and Tom Box. In 2022, it partnered with Samka Productions to launch a French animation studio and pre-production company named Kazoo Animation.
- Bluefield Solar Income Fund – is an investment trust company focused on low carbon energy assets in the UK. Headquartered in St. Peter Port, Guernsey; it was established in 2013 and listed on the London Stock Exchange the same year.
- Blueprint Pictures – is a film production company. Established in 2005, its headquarters is in London.
- BMF – is an alternative name of the fitness company Be Military Fit.
- Bodmin and Wadebridge Railway – was a railway company established in 1832 that operated from 1834 to 1847.
- Bodycote – is an engineering services company that supplies heat treatments, metal joining, hot isostatic pressing, and coatings services. It is headquartered in Macclesfield, Cheshire.
  Bodycote logo
  It was founded in 1923 by Arthur Bodycote in Hinckley as a textile business named G.R. Bodycote Ltd. In the 1970s it refocused on engineering services. It has 2 business divisions. The Aerospace, Defence & Energy division (ADE) serves the aerospace, defence, power generation, and oil and gas industries. The Automotive & General Industrial division (AGI) serves the automotive, construction, machine building, medical, and transportation industries. In 2022 its revenue was £743 million, with a net income of £74 million.
- bolexbrothers – was an animation film production company. Established in 1993, its headquarters was in Bristol.
- Bolckow, Vaughan – was a mining, ironmaking, and steel production company that operated from 1840 to 1929. Its headquarters was in Middlesbrough.
- Bolsover Colliery Company – was a coal mining company that operated from 1889 to 1947. Headquartered in Bolsover, Derbyshire, in 1947 it was nationalised and became part of the National Coal Board.
- Bolton and Preston Railway – was a railway company established in 1837 that operated from 1837 to 1844.
- Bombay Spirits Company Ltd – is a producer of gin located at Laverstoke Mill, Laverstoke, Hampshire. It is owned by Bacardi.

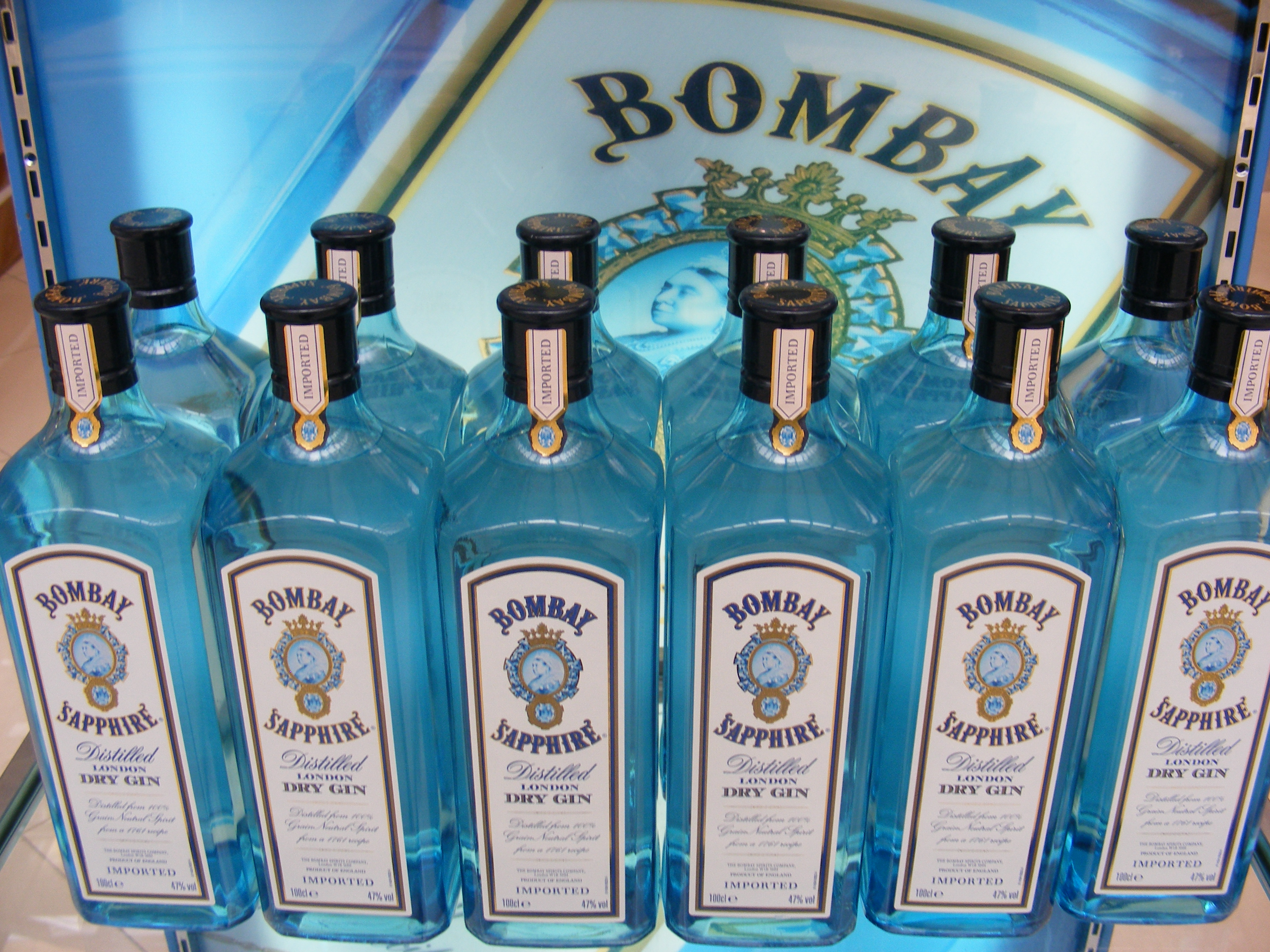
Bombay Sapphire bottles

- Bonmarché – is a company that operates a womenswear store chain, and retail website. It is headquartered in Wakefield, West Yorkshire. It was founded in 1982 by Parkash Singh Chima. It was acquired by the Peacock Group in 2002, then by Sun European Partners in 2012.
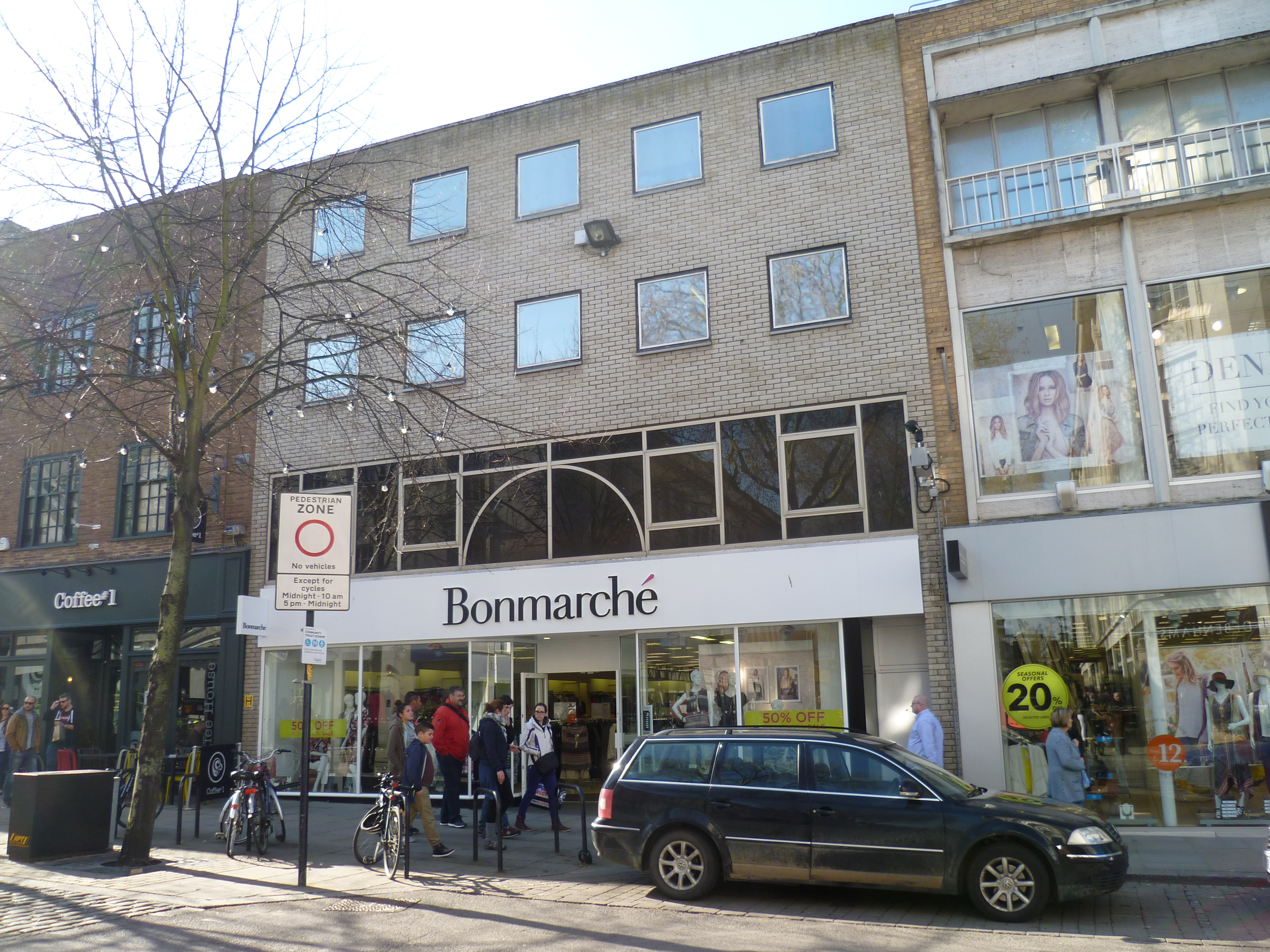
  Bonmarche store in Gloucester
  In 2019 it was acquired by Philip Day in 2019 before being put into administration later that year. It is now a subsidiary of Edinburgh Woollen Mill which is owned by Purepay Retail.
- Boohoo Group plc – is a clothing manufacturer and online retailer specialising in clothes for 16 to 30 year olds. It is headquartered in Manchester. It was founded in 2006 by Mahmud Kamani and Carol Kane. In 2014 it was floated on the AIM submarket of the London Stock Exchange. In 2019 it acquired the online businesses of Karen Millen and Coast. In 2020 it acquired the brands and website of Oasis Stores and Warehouse. In 2021 it acquired the brand and online business of Debenhams, and also the Arcadia Group's brands Burton, Wallis, and Dorothy Perkins. Its subsidiaries include boohooMan, PrettyLittleThing, Nasty Gal, and MissPap.
- Booths – is the trading name of E. H. Booth & Co Ltd, a supermarket retailer.
- Boots UK Ltd (trading as Boots) – is a pharmaceutical, and health and beauty products supplier and manufacturer, and provides photography services. It operates a retail stores chain, and a retail website.
  Boots logo
  Established in 1849, its headquarters is in Nottingham. It was formerly known as Boots the Chemists, and Boots Pure Drugs Company. Since 2023 it is owned by Sycamore Partners and Stefano Pessina and family.
- Boots Opticians Ltd – is an optometry company that operates a retail chain of dispensing opticians clinics. The clinics are either company-owned or franchises. It is headquartered in Beeston, Nottinghamshire. It was founded in 1983 and became a subsidiary of Boots in 1987. In 2009 it was merged with Dollond & Aitchison. It is now a subsidiary of Walgreens Boots Alliance. Its acquisitions include Clement Clarke Ltd, and Curry and Paxton Ltd.
- Bourne Leisure – is a leisure company that operates caravan parks, holiday camps, and hotels. Established in 1964 in Whitstable, its headquarters is in Hemel Hempstead, Hertfordshire.
- Bournemouth Water – is a utility company supplying water. Established in 1863, its headquarters is in Bournemouth, Dorset. Its parent company is South West Water which is owned by the Pennon Group.
- Bovis Construction – was a construction company headquartered in London. It was founded in 1885 by Charles William Bovis as C.W. Bovis & Co. It was later known as Bovis Holdings and then Bovis Construction. It had a number of retail clients such as Marks & Spencer. In the 1950s it moved into housing through Bovis Homes. In the 1970s it diversified into banking with the acquisition of Twentieth Century Banking. After a banking crisis P&O rescued the company in 1974 and Bovis became a subsidiary of P&O. Bovis Homes was demerged in 1997. In 1999 Bovis Construction was acquired by Lendlease Group and became Bovis Lend Lease until the brand was discontinued.
- Bovis Homes – was a housebuilding company that originated as a part of Bovis Holdings, and Bovis Construction. In 1974 P&O acquired Bovis Holdings. In 1997 Bovis Homes was demerged and floated on the London Stock Exchange. In 2019 it was merged with Galliford Try's housing businesses to form Vistry Group.
- Bowler Manufacturing – is a manufacturer of off-road racing cars. Established in 1985, its headquarters is in Belper, Derbyshire. Since 2019 it is owned by Jaguar Land Rover.
- Bradford & Bingley – was a financial services banking company that operated from 1964 to 2010. Formerly a building society, its headquarters was in Bingley, West Yorkshire. It was formed by the merger of the Bradford Equitable Building Society with the Bingley Permanent Building Society. It was nationalised in 2008, and in 2010 the savings business was subsumed by Santander Group, while the mortgage business was merged with Northern Rock to form UK Asset Resolution.
- Brazil Iron – is a metals and mining company. Established in 2000, its headquarters is in London.
- Brechin and Edzell District Railway – was a railway company established in 1890 that operated from 1896 to 1923.
- Brecon and Merthyr Tydfil Junction Railway – was a railway company established in 1859 that operated from 1863 to 1922.
- Breedon Group – is a construction materials company headquartered in Breedon on the Hill, Leicestershire.
  Breedon Group logo
  Its products include: aggregates, asphalt, concrete, contract surfacing and highway maintenance, cement, bitumen, bricks, tiles, and clay products.
- Bremont Watch Company – is a private company that is a luxury watchmaker. Established in 2002, its headquarters is in Henley-on-Thames.
- BrewDog plc – is a multinational brewery, and pub chain. It produces various types of ales, lagers, and spirits. It is headquartered in Ellon, Aberdeenshire, Scotland.
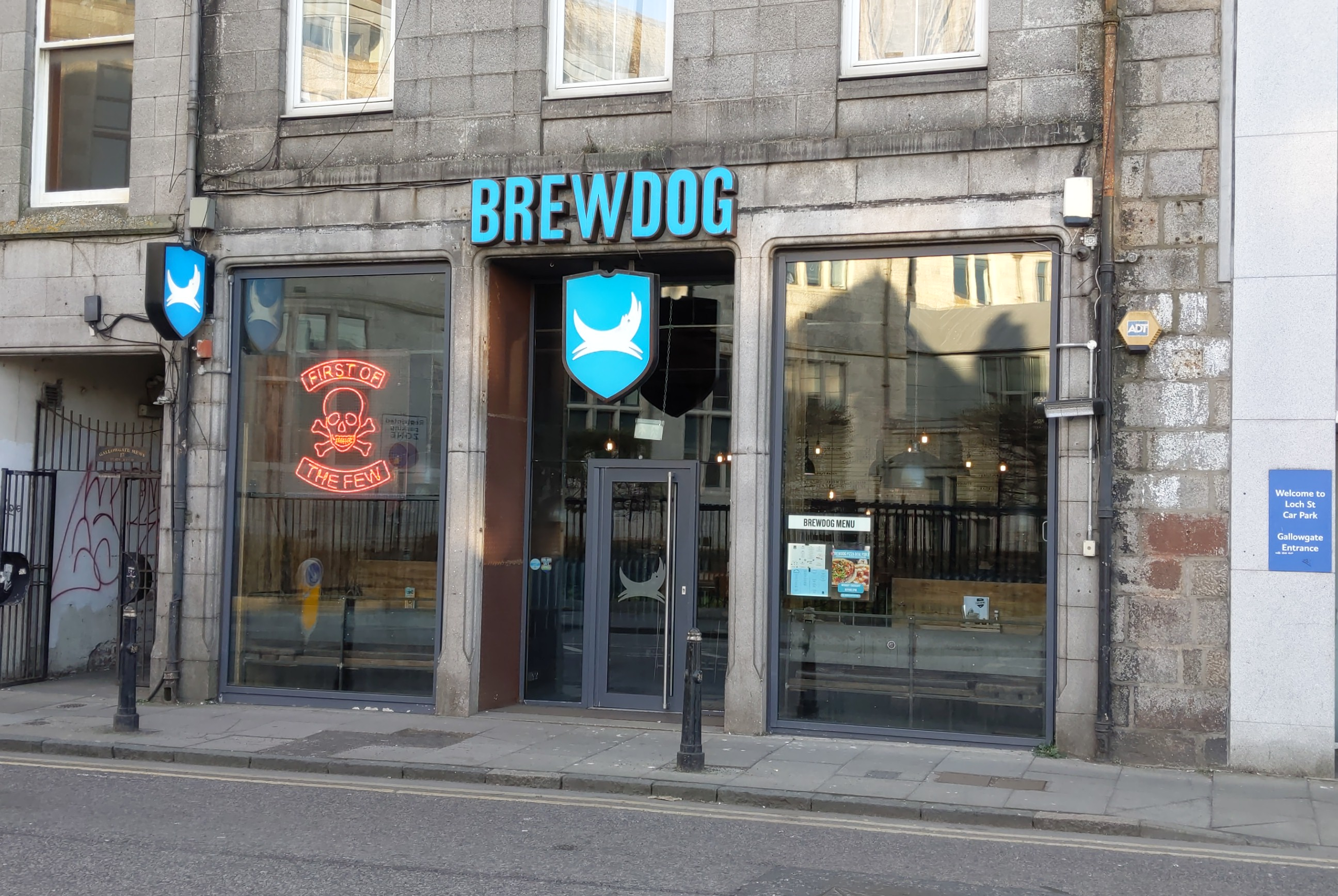
  The first BrewDog bar, located in Aberdeen
  It was founded in 2007 by James Watt and Martin Dickie in Fraserburgh. In 2026 the company's UK and Ireland operations were acquired by Tilray.
- Brewers Fayre – is a hospitality company operating a licensed restaurant chain. Established in 1979, its headquarters is in Dunstable, Bedfordshire. Its parent company is Whitbread.
- Bridge of Weir Railway – was a railway company established in 1862 that operated from 1864 to 1865.
- Bridgepoint Group plc – is a private investment company headquartered in London. It was founded in 1984 as NatWest Equity Partners, a private equity division of NatWest. In 2000 it was the subject of a management buyout and renamed Bridgepoint Capital. It was later renamed Bridgepoint Advisors, and then Bridgepoint Group.
  Bridge point logo
  In 2021 it was floated on the London Stock Exchange. In 2025 its assets under management were valued at £38.8 billion.
- Bridgewater Collieries – was a coal mining company that operated from 1921 to 1929. It became part of Manchester Collieries.
- Briggs Automotive Company – is a manufacturer of sports cars. Established in 2009, its headquarters is in Speke, Liverpool.
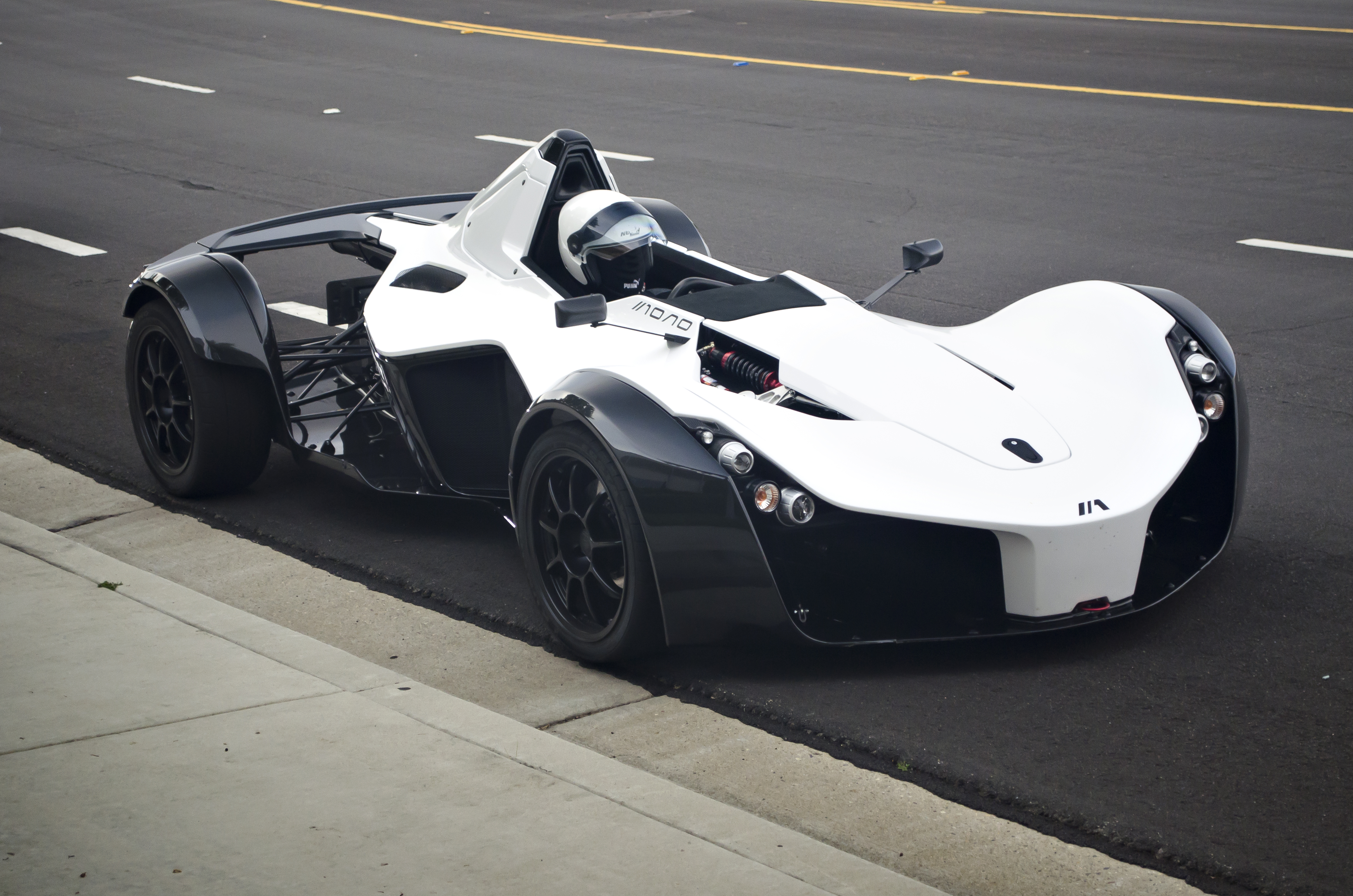
  BAC Mono
- Bristol and Exeter Railway – was a railway company established in 1836 that operated from 1841 to 1876.
- Bristol Water – is a utility company supplying water. Established in 1846, its headquarters is in Bristol. It was formerly known as the Bristol Waterworks Company. In 2021 it was acquired by Pennon Group.
- Britannia Building Society – was a mutual building society providing savings products and mortgages that operated from 1856 to 2009. Its headquarters was in Leek, Staffordshire. It was formed as the Leek and Morlands Permanent Benefit Building Society. Through a series of mergers it later became the Leek and Westbourne, the Westbourne and Eastern Counties, and in 1975 the Britannia Building Society. In 2009 it was merged into The Co-operative Banking Group.
- British Aerospace – was an aircraft, munitions, and defence systems manufacturing company that operated from 1977 to 1999. It was also an automobile manufacturer from 1988 to 1994 through its subsidiary Rover Group. Its headquarters was in Farnborough, Hampshire.
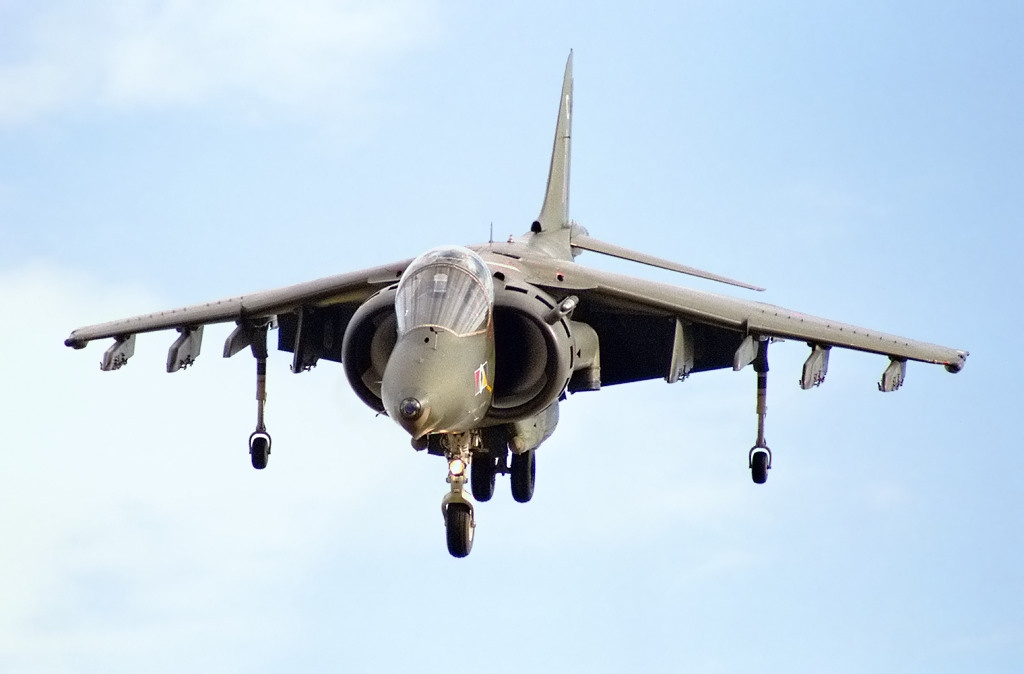
  Harrier GR5 manufactured by British Aerospace
  It was formed from the nationalisation and merger of the British Aircraft Corporation, Hawker Siddeley Aviation, Hawker Siddeley Dynamics, and Scottish Aviation. In 1999 it was merged with Marconi Electronic Systems to form BAE Systems.
- British Airways – is an airline company. Established in 1974, its headquarters is Waterside, Harmondsworth. It was formed as a nationalised company from the merger of British Overseas Airways Corporation, British European Airways, Cambrian Airways and Northeast Airlines. It was privatised in 1987.
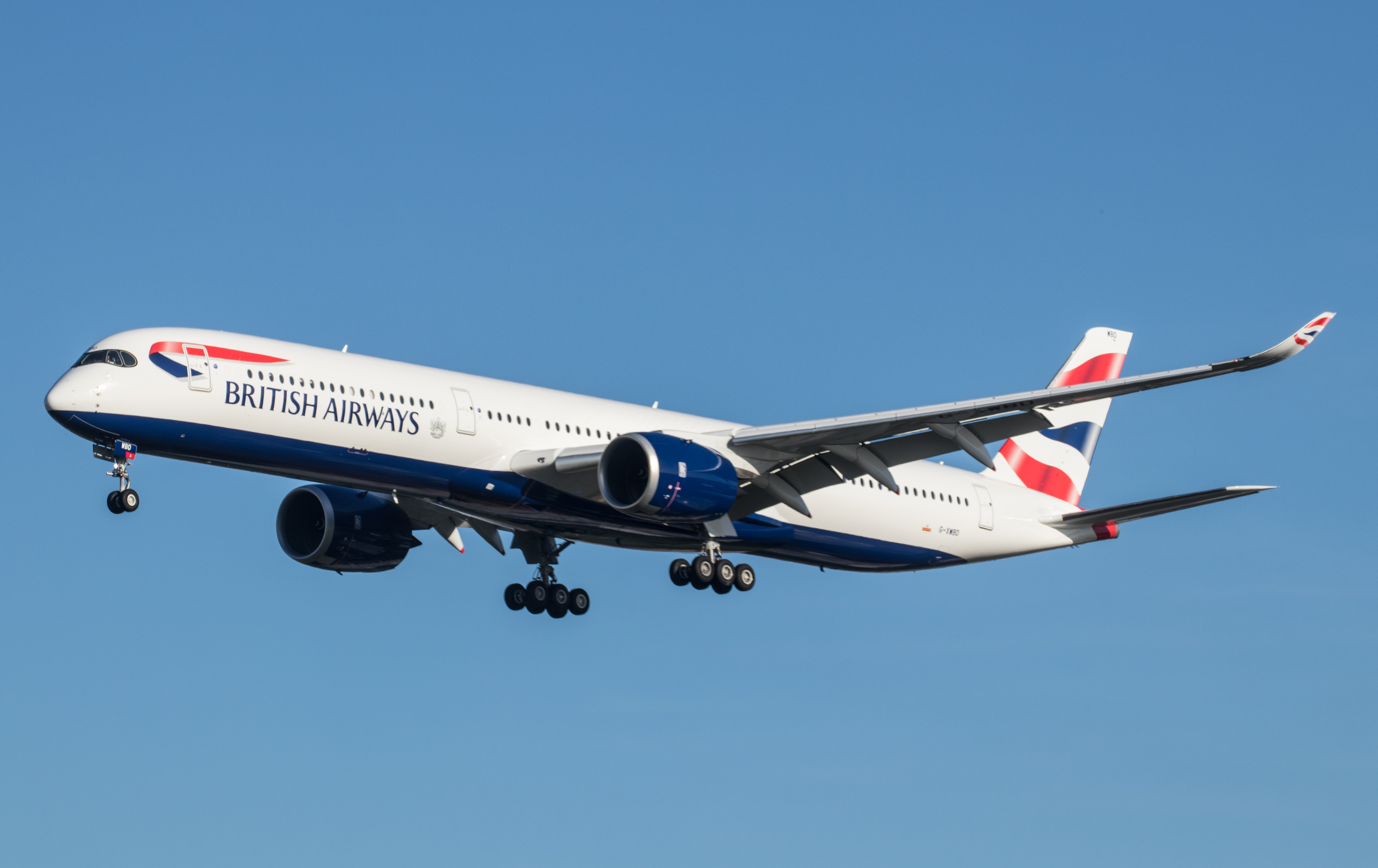
  A British Airways Airbus A350-1000
  Its parent company is International Airlines Group.
- British Aluminium – was an aluminium production company that operated from 1894 to 2007. It was also known as British Alcan Aluminium.
- British American Tobacco – is a cigarette and tobacco manufacturing company that previously also operated in retailing, and financial services. Established in 1902, its headquarters is in London. It was formed when the Imperial Tobacco Company and the American Tobacco Company created a joint venture, the British-American Tobacco Company.
- British and Colonial Films – was a film production company that operated from 1908 to 1924. Headquartered in London, it was first named British and Colonial Kinematograph Company.
- British and Dominions Film Corporation – was a film production company that operated from 1929 to 1938. Its headquarters was in Borehamwood, Hertfordshire.
- British Biotech – was a biotechnology company producing pharmaceuticals, that operated from 1986 to 2003. Its headquarters was in Oxford. In 2003 it was merged into Ribo Targets and then into Vernalis plc.
- British Coal – was a nationalised coal mining corporation that operated from 1946 to 1997. It was formerly known as The National Coal Board. It was privatised and succeeded by UK Coal.
  British Coal logo
- British Energy – was an energy company generating electricity, that operated from 1995 to 2009. Its headquarters was in London. It was acquired and subsumed by Electricite de France (EDF).
- British Gas Corporation – was a state owned energy company supplying and distributing gas, that operated from 1972 to 1986. It was formed from the 12 regional gas boards. In 1986 it was privatised to become British Gas plc.
- British Gas plc – was an energy company supplying gas, and home services, that operated from 1986 to 1997. It was formed from the privatisation of the British Gas Corporation. In 1997 it was demerged into Centrica, BG Group, and Transco.
- British Home Stores (BHS) – was a multinational department store chain offering clothing, homewares, furniture, electronic products, entertainment products, fragrance and beauty products, and groceries. It also had in-store restaurants. It was headquartered in London.
  British Home Stores logo
  It was founded in 1928 in Brixton by a group of US entrepreneurs. The store chain was increased and, in 1933, the company was floated on the London Stock Exchange. The expansion increased and there was a joint venture from 1977 with Sainsbury's to create a hypermarket chain called SavaCentre which Sainsbury's bought out in 1989. In 1986 BHS was merged with Habitat and Mothercare to form Storehouse plc. In 2000 it was acquired by Philip Green who took the company private and, in 2009, included it in Arcadia Group. In 2015 BHS was sold to Retail Acquisitions. In 2016 it was put into administration and then liquidated. The non-UK franchise stores were acquired by the Al Mana Group, while the BHS website is owned and operated by Litecraft Group Ltd who use the BHS logo and brandname under license.
- British Instructional Films – was a film production company that operated from 1919 to 1932.
- British International Pictures – was a film production, distribution, and exhibition company. See Associated British Picture Corporation.
- British International Investment (formerly CDC Group, Commonwealth Development Corporation, and Colonial Development Corporation) – is a UK government owned development finance company. It is focused on the emerging markets of South Asia and Africa. Founded in 1948; it is headquartered in London.
- British Land – is a real estate investment trust active in property development and investment. Established in 1856, its headquarters is in London. It was formed as an offshoot of the National Freehold Land Society. In 2022 its revenue was £430 million, with a net income of £958 million.
- British Leyland – was an automobile manufacturing and engineering company that operated from 1965 to 1986. Its headquarters were in Longbridge, Birmingham, and Cowley, Oxfordshire. Also known as BLMC Ltd, it was first established with the merger of Leyland Motors, and British Motor Holdings.It was part nationalised in 1975.
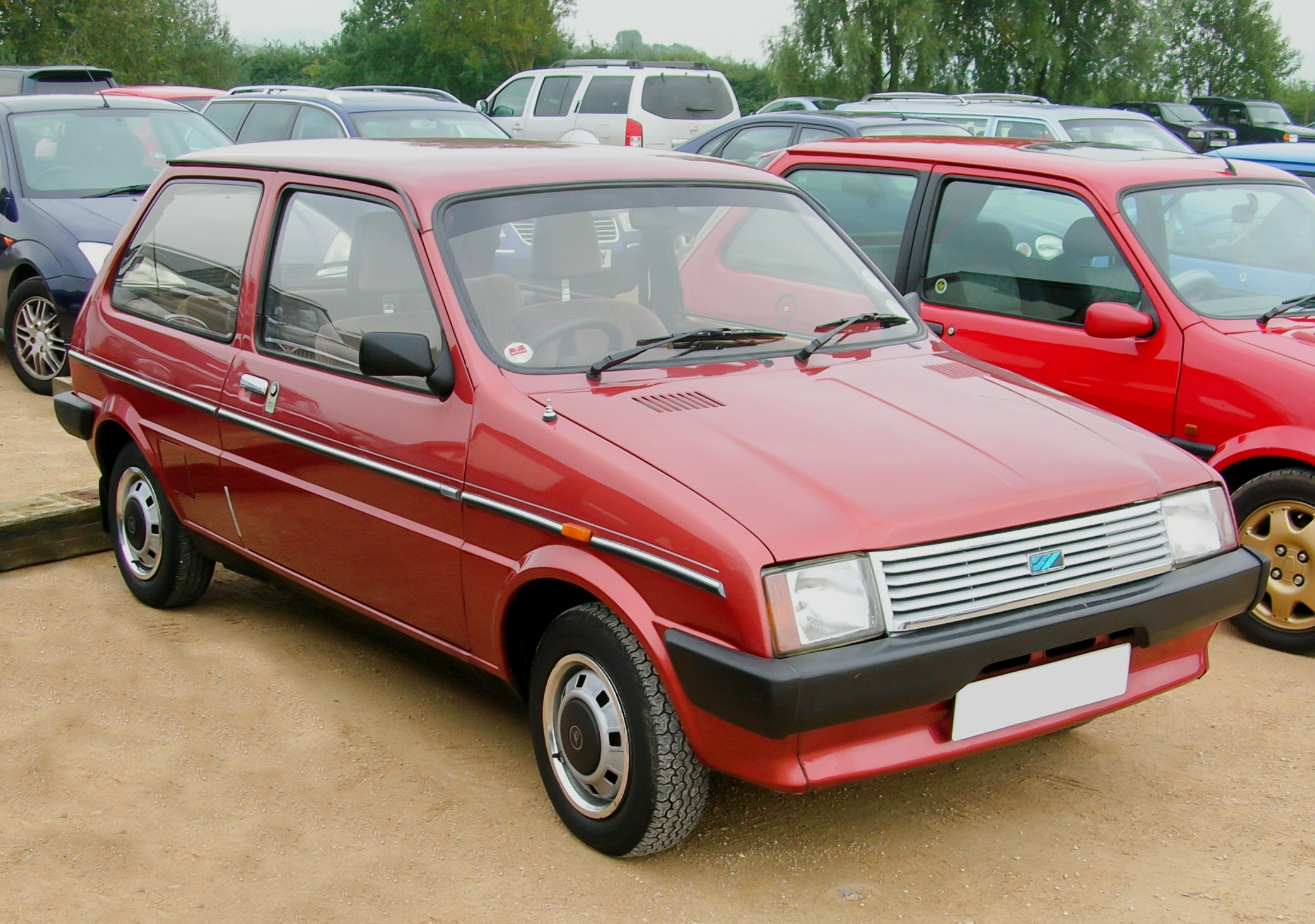
  1983 Austin Metro
  In 1986 it was renamed as The Rover Group and was privatised as a subsidiary of British Aerospace from 1988 to 1994.
- British Lion Films – is a film production and distribution company. Established in 1919, it was first named British Lion Film Corporation Ltd.
- British Nuclear Fuels – was a government owned nuclear energy and nuclear fuel company. It was founded in 1971 from the demerger of the production division of the UK Atomic Energy Authority and operated until 2010. It manufactured nuclear fuel, ran reactors, generated and sold electricity, reprocessed and managed spent fuel, and decommissioned some nuclear power plants.
- British Rail – was a government owned railway company that operated from 1948 to 1997.
  British Rail logo
  It was formed from the nationalisation of the Big Four British railway companies and was privatised in stages between 1994 and 1997.
- British Steel Limited – is a steel company manufacturing long steel products). Established in 2016, it was formed from the sale of long steel production by Tata Steel Europe to Greybull Capital. In 2020 it was acquired by Jingye Group. In 2026 it was nationalised.
- British Steel plc – was a steel production company that operated from 1967 to 1999. Formerly known as the British Steel Corporation, it was formed from the nationalisation of 14 private steel companies. It was privatised in 1988, and in 1999 it was merged with Koninklijke Hoogovens to form Corus Group.
- British Sugar plc – is a producer of sugar from sugar beet as well as medicinal cannabis, bioethanol, animal feed, topsoil, and soil conditioners. Headquartered in Peterborough; it is the sole British intermediary and producer of sugar from sugar beet. It was founded in 1936 when the UK government nationalised all of the sugar beet processing industry into the British Sugar Corporation. In 1972 it began selling its sugar products under the name Silver Spoon.
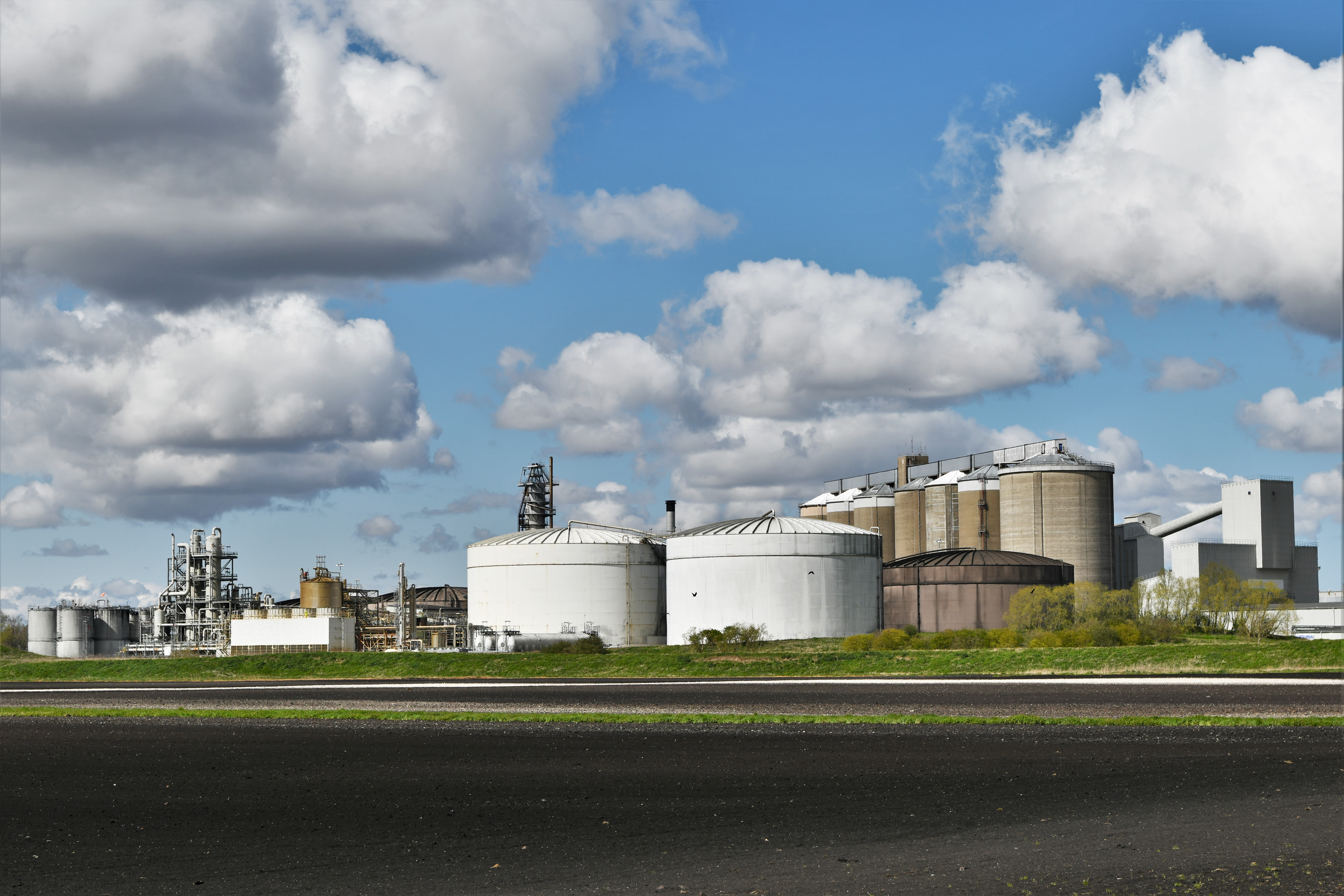
  Wissington Sugar Factory, Norfolk
  In 1982 its name was shortened to British Sugar plc, and it was acquired by Beresford International. In 1991 it was sold to Associated British Foods of which it is a subsidiary. It acquired sugar producer Billingtons in 2004.
- British Super Films – was a film production company. See G.B. Samuelson Productions.
- British Transport Films – was a railway documentary film production company. It operated from 1949 to circa 1986.
- British United Provident Association (Bupa) – is a multinational health insurance and healthcare company headquartered in London. It is a private company limited by guarantee. Its healthcare operations include: hospitals (mainly in Spain, Poland, and Chile), outpatient clinics, dental centres, digital services, and aged care facilities.
  BUPA logo
  It was founded in 1947 when seventeen British provident associations amalgamated to provide healthcare. Since then it has expanded internationally with many acquisitions. In 2021 its revenue was £12.9 billion, with a net income of £423 million.
- Britvic – is a producer of soft drinks that is headquartered in Hemel Hempstead, Hertfordshire. It has over 40 brands including: Robinsons, MiWadi, Tango, Club, Purdey's, R. White's Lemonade, Cidona, J2O, and Teisseire. It is also the UK franchise holder and licensed bottler for PepsiCo drinks.
  Cans of soft drinks Tango Apple and Tango Orange produced by Britvic
  It was founded in 1845 in Chelmsford as the British Vitamin Products Company. In 1938 it began producing fruit juices and in 1949 marketed them under the Britvic name. The company itself was renamed Britvik in 1971. In 1986 it was merged with Canada Dry Rawlings. It was acquired by Carlsberg Group in 2024. Carlsberg's UK operations were merged with Britvic plc, forming Carlsberg Britvic in 2025, with Britvic Ltd being a wholly owned subsidiary of the new company.
- Brompton and Piccadilly Circus Railway – was a railway company established in 1896 to construct an underground railway in London. In 1902, the company merged with the Great Northern and Strand Railway to form the Great Northern, Piccadilly and Brompton Railway and became a subsidiary of the Underground Electric Railways Company of London. The combined railway opened in 1906 between Finsbury Park and Hammersmith. It now forms part of the London Underground's Piccadilly line.
- Brompton Bicycle Limited – is a manufacturer of folding bicycles based in Greenford, London. It was founded in 1976 by Andrew Ritchie.
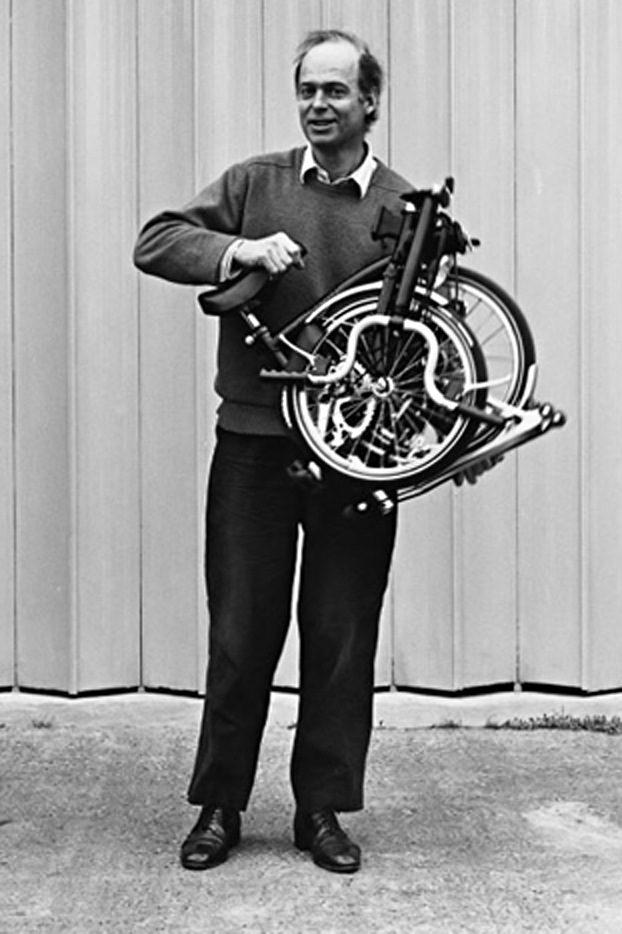
  Founder Andrew Ritchie with a folded Brompton bicycle
  Brompton is the largest volume bicycle maker in the UK with approximately 50,000 bicycles made each year.
- Brooke Cars – is a manufacturer of sports cars. Established in 2002, its headquarters is in Honiton, Devon.
- Brooke Marine – was a ship building company, including civilian, commercial, and warships. It operated from 1874 to 1992. It was also an automobile manufacturer from 1901 to 1913, and a car engines manufacturer until 1938. Headquartered in Lowestoft, Suffolk, it was also known as JW Brooke & Co, and Brooke Yachts.
- Brora distillery – is a producer of Scottish whisky based in Brora, Scotland. It was founded in 1819 by the Marquess of Stafford as Clynelish until the Clynelish distillery opened in 1968 when it was renamed Brora distillery.
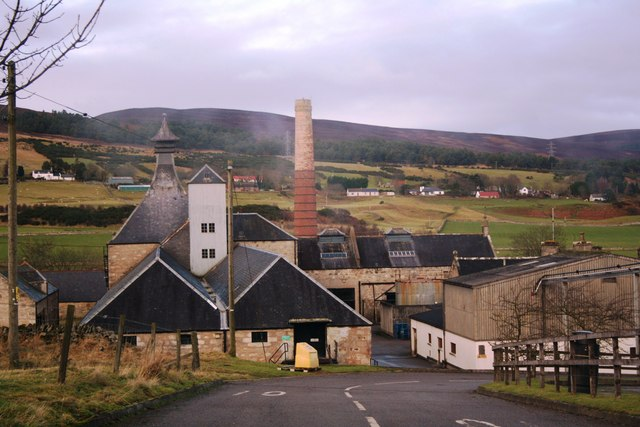
  Brora Distillery
  In 1983 production ended until 2021 when it was reactivated. It is owned by Diageo.
- Broseley Estates Ltd – was a house building company headquartered in Leigh, Lancashire. It was founded in 1953 by Daniel Horrocks. In 1960 it was re-formed as the Broseley Investment Company. It expanded until in the early 1980s it was the UK's fourth largest housebuilder. In 1986 its majority owner Guardian Royal Exchange kept the commercial property operation but sold Broseley Estates to Trafalgar House where it became part of Ideal Homes.
- Brothers Drinks Company Ltd – is a producer of fruit ciders and a bottling company. It is headquartered in Shepton Mallet, Somerset.
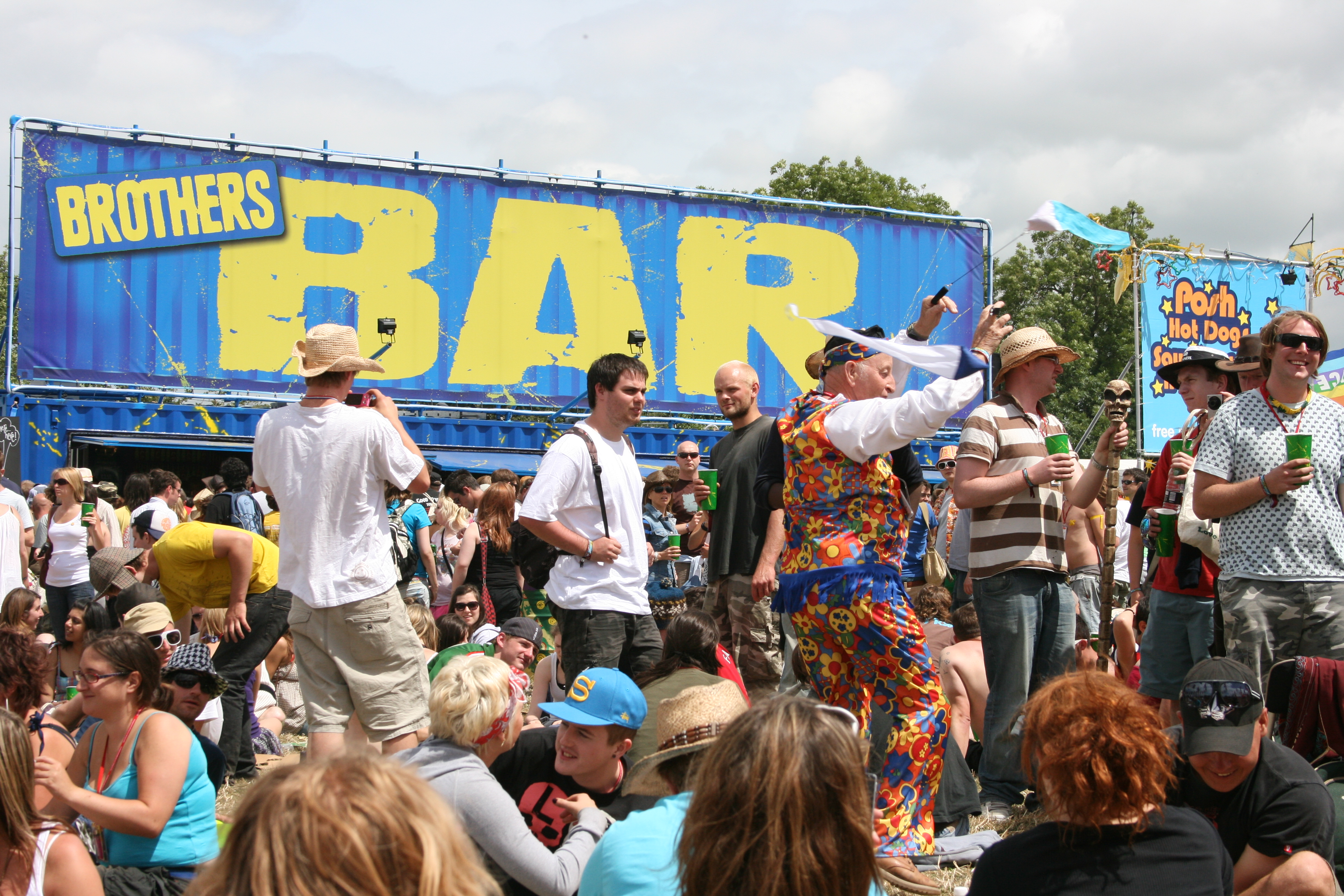
  Brothers Bar at Glastonbury Festival in 2008
  It was founded in 1992 by four Showering brothers whose father invented Babycham. In 2021 the Babycham brand was acquired for the company.
- Brouhaha Entertainment – is an independent film and television production company headquartered in London and Sydney, Australia. It was founded in 2021 by Gabrielle Tana, Troy Lum and Andrew Mason.
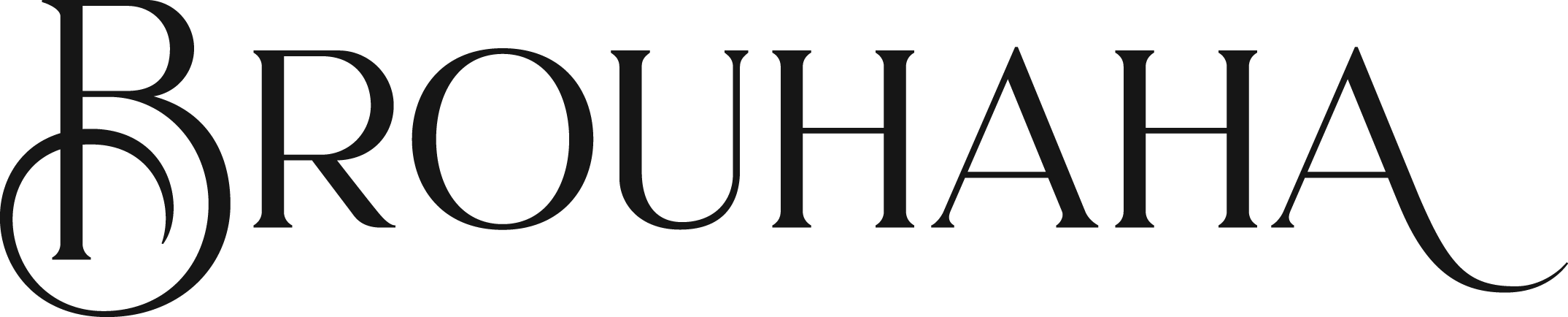
  Brouhaha Entertainment logo
  Its productions include the television series Boy Swallows Universe, and films such as Lee, Dangerous Animals, and Long Day's Journey into Night.
- Brown Lloyd James – was a UK public relations company. Its UK operations went into liquidation in 2024 while the US and Qatar divisions continue as Brown Lloyd James Worldwide.
- Brunner Investment Trust – is an investment trust company focused on global equities. It was founded in 1927 by the Brunner family from the proceeds of disposing of the family interest in Brunner Mond & Co which was the largest of the four companies amalgamated to form Imperial Chemical Industries (ICI). Headquartered in London; it is managed by Allianz Global Investors.
- Bryanston Films (UK) – was a film production company that operated from 1959 to 1963.
- BT Group – is a British multinational telecommunications company providing fixed line telephony, mobile telephony, broadband internet, and digital television. Established in 1969 as a public corporation, it was privatised in 1984.
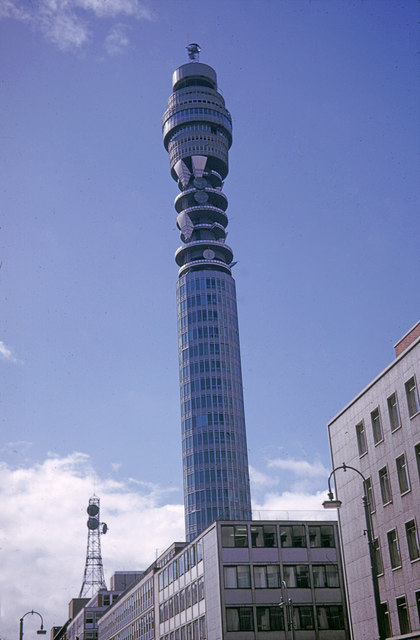
  Telecom Tower, a former communications tower of BT
  Its headquarters is in London. Formerly known as Post Office Telecommunications, British Telecom, and then trading as BT, it has 7 divisions and 3 subsidiaries. In 2026 its revenue was £19.6 billion, with a net income of £1.07 billion.
- Buckinghamshire Building Society – is a building society offering mortgages and savings. It is based in Chalfont St Giles, Buckinghamshire. It was founded in 1907 as the Chalfont & District Permanent Building Society. In 1961 it was renamed the Buckinghamshire Building Society.
- Buckinghamshire Railway – was a railway company established in 1847 that operated from 1847 to 1879.
- Budgen Stores Ltd (trading as Budgens) – is a company that operates a retail chain of franchise convenience stores. It is headquartered in Harefield, London. It was founded in 1872 by John Budgen. Formerly trading as Budgen, it was renamed Budgens circa 1990. In 2002 it was acquired by Musgrave. In 2015 it was acquired by Booker Group which is now owned by Tesco plc.
- Bulb Energy – was an energy company supplying electricity and gas. Established in 2013, its headquarters was in London. It was formerly known as Regent Power, and Hanbury Energy. In 2022 it was acquired and absorbed by Octopus Energy.
- Bullo Pill Railway – was a railway company established in 1809 that operated from 1810 to 1826.
- Bunzl plc – is a British multinational distribution and outsourcing company headquartered in London.
  Bunzl logo
  It was established in 1940 in London by the Bunzl family as Tissue Papers Ltd. At first it manufactured cigarette filters, crepe, and tissue paper. It later produced fibres, pulp, paper, building materials, and plastics before it was restructured as a distribution company. It distributes catering equipment, cleaning products, paper and plastic packaging, food processing equipment, medical gloves and disposable hygiene products, personal protective equipment, and vending machine supplies.
- BUPA – is a multinational health insurance and healthcare company. See British United Provident Association Ltd.
- Burberry Group plc – is a luxury fashion manufacturer and retailer. Founded in 1856 in Basingstoke, it is now headquartered in London. In 2026 its revenue was £2.4 billion, with a net income of £20 million.
- Burry Port and Gwendraeth Valley Railway – was a railway company established in 1866 that operated from 1866 to 1922.
- Burton's Biscuit Company – is a biscuit and savoury snack manufacturer. It was founded in 1935 by Joseph Burton; previously the first Burton's Biscuits were baked for sale by his grandfather George Burton in Liverpool.
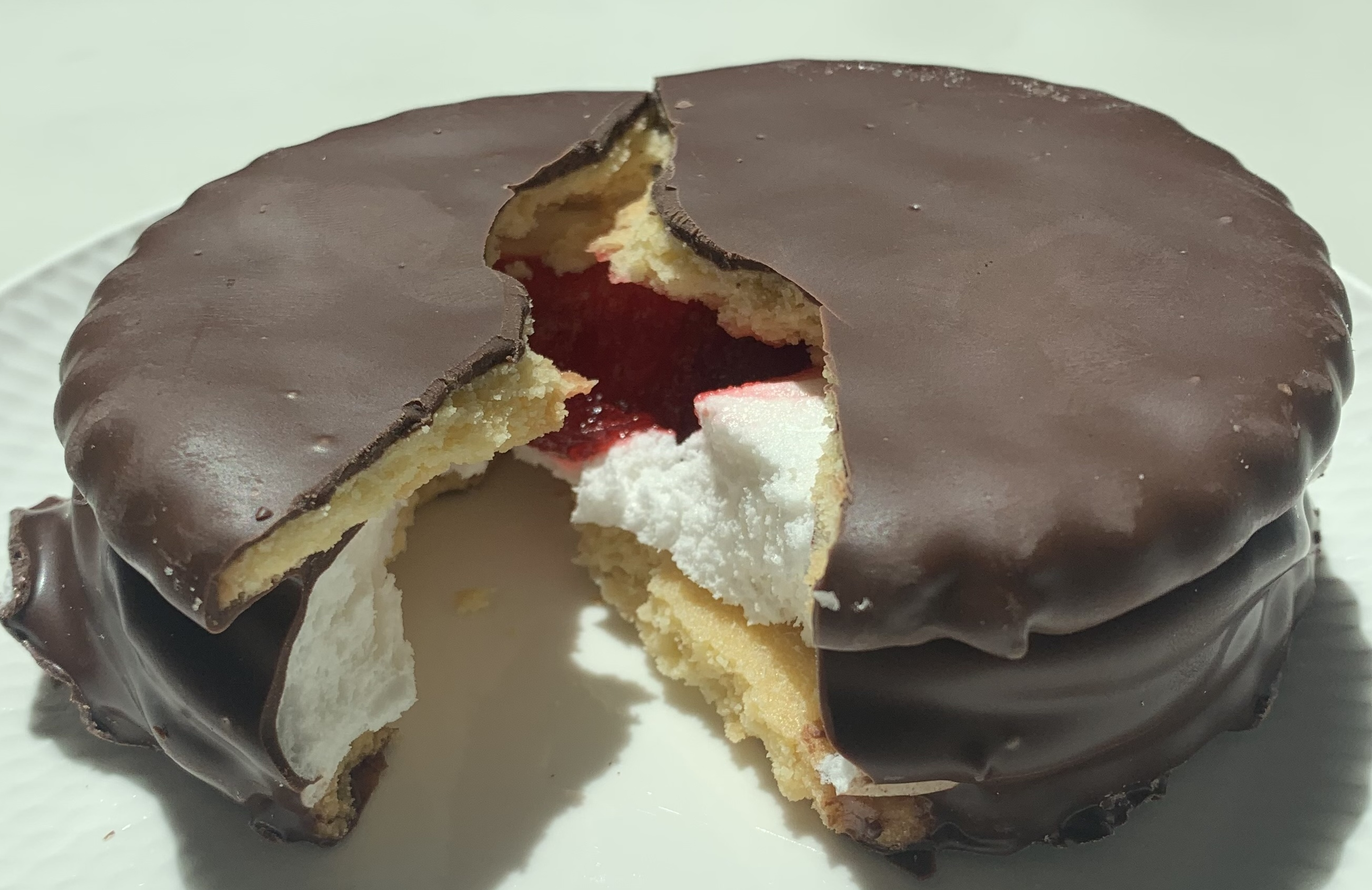
  Inside a Wagon Wheel produced by Burton's Biscuit Company
  Headquartered in St Albans, it has had a number of different owners and in June 2021 it was bought by Ferrero SpA.
- Bury St Edmunds and Thetford Railway – was a railway company established in 1873 that operated from 1876 to 1878.
- Bushey Studios – was a film studio that operated from 1913 to 1985. Its headquarters was in Bushey, Hertfordshire.
- Business Stream – is a utility company supplying water, and sewage disposal for non-domestic sites. Established in 2006, its headquarters is in Edinburgh, Scotland. Its parent company is Scottish Water.
- Butlins – is a leisure company that operates holiday camps and hotels. Established in 1936, its headquarters is in Hemel Hempstead.
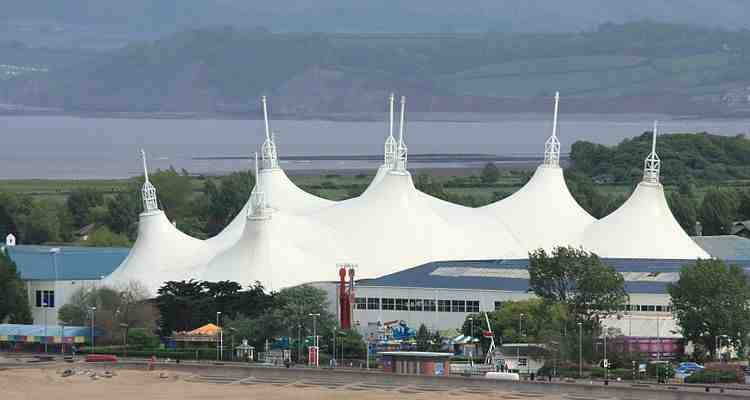
  Skyline Pavilion at Butlins Minehead
  Since 2022 it is owned and run by Butlins Skyline Ltd which is owned by The Harris Family Trust.
- Bytes Technology Group – is a re-seller of computer software. It is headquartered in Leatherhead, Surrey. It was founded in 1982 in a shop in Epsom. In 1998 it was acquired by Allied Electronics Corporation (Altron). In 2020 it was demerged from Altron and floated on the London Stock Exchange. In 2026 its revenue was £220 million, with net income of £51 million.

== C ==
- Cadbury - formerly named "Cadburys" and "Cadbury Schweppes " is a British multinational confectionery company that is the second largest confectionery brand in the world after Mars. Its products include Cadbury Dairy Milk, Cadbury Fruit and Nut, Bournville, Cadbury Creme Egg, Cadbury Roses, Crunchie, Double Decker, Cadbury Caramel, Wispa, Boost, Picnic, Flake, Curly Wurly and Milk Tray. It was established in 1824 by John Cadbury in Birmingham. Its headquarters are in Denham, Buckinghamshire.
  Cadbury logo
  Cadbury merged with J. S. Fry & Sons in 1919, and with Schweppes in 1969 to form Cadbury Schweppes until Schweppes was demerged in 2008. Cadbury also owns Maynards Bassets (whose products include Liquorice Allsorts, Jelly Babies, and Wine Gums), Halls (cough sweets) and Trebor (mints). Cadbury was bought by Kraft Foods Inc. in 2010, and became a subsidiary of Mondelez International.
- Caffè Nero – is a comp any that operates a multinational coffeehouse chain and has its own roastery. It is headquartered in London. It was founded in 1997 by Gerry Ford who remains the owner.
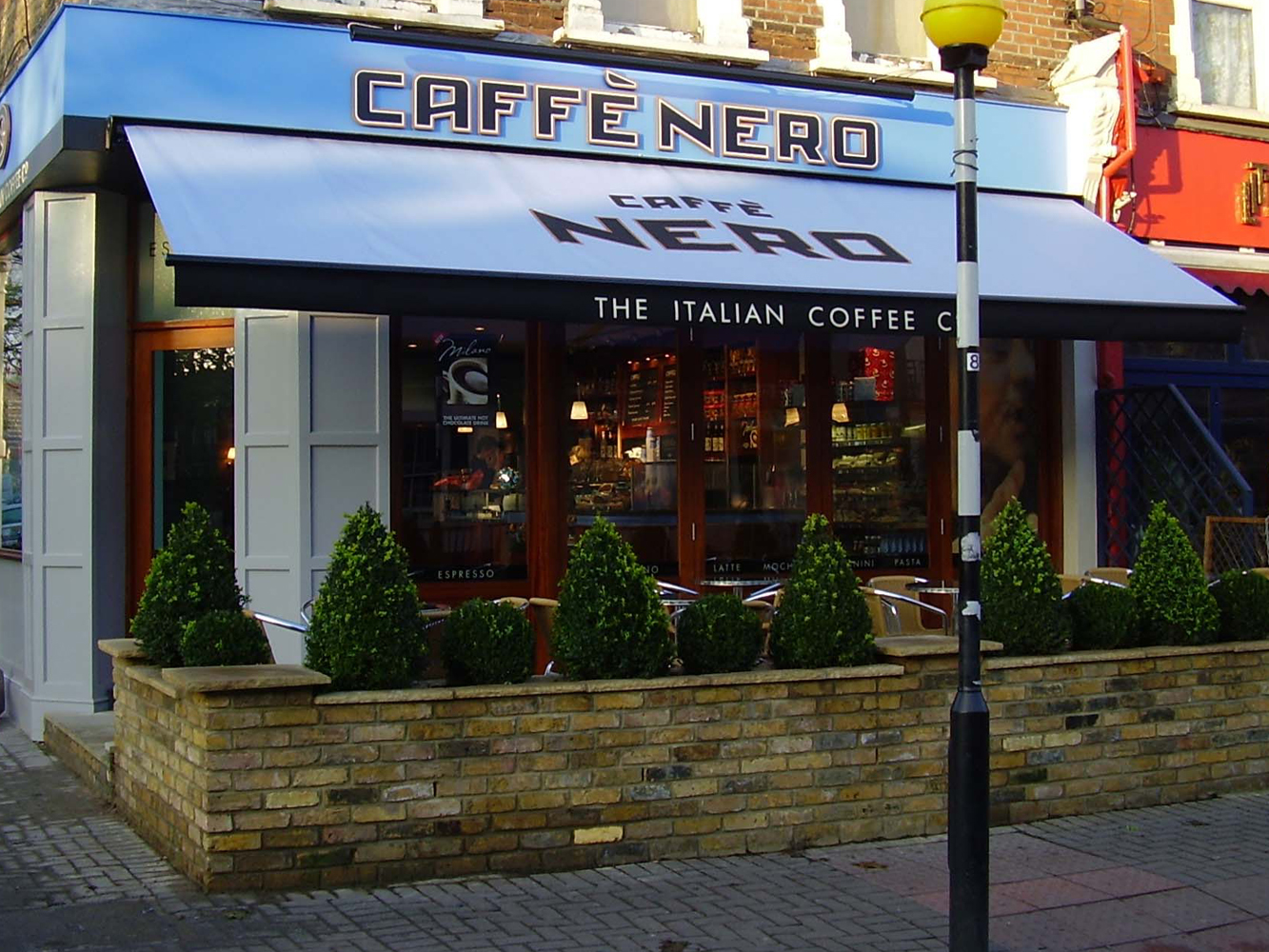
  Caffé Nero at Wandsworth Bridge Road, London
  In 2001 it was floated on the London Stock Exchange before going private again in 2007. Its subsidiaries are Harris + Hoole, Coffee#1, and Aroma Coffee.
- Caffia Coffee Group – is a supplier of coffee machines and coffee products to the workplaces and restaurants market. It is a family-run business headquartered in Falkirk, Scotland. It was founded in 1985 as Lomond Coffee Services. In 2013 it was renamed Caffia Coffee Group.
- cahoot – is a financial services company providing online banking. Established in 2000, its headquarters is in Belfast, Northern Ireland. Formerly part of Abbey National, it is now part of Santander UK.
- Cake Box – is a chain of franchise bakeries specialising in egg-free fresh cream cakes made in-store.
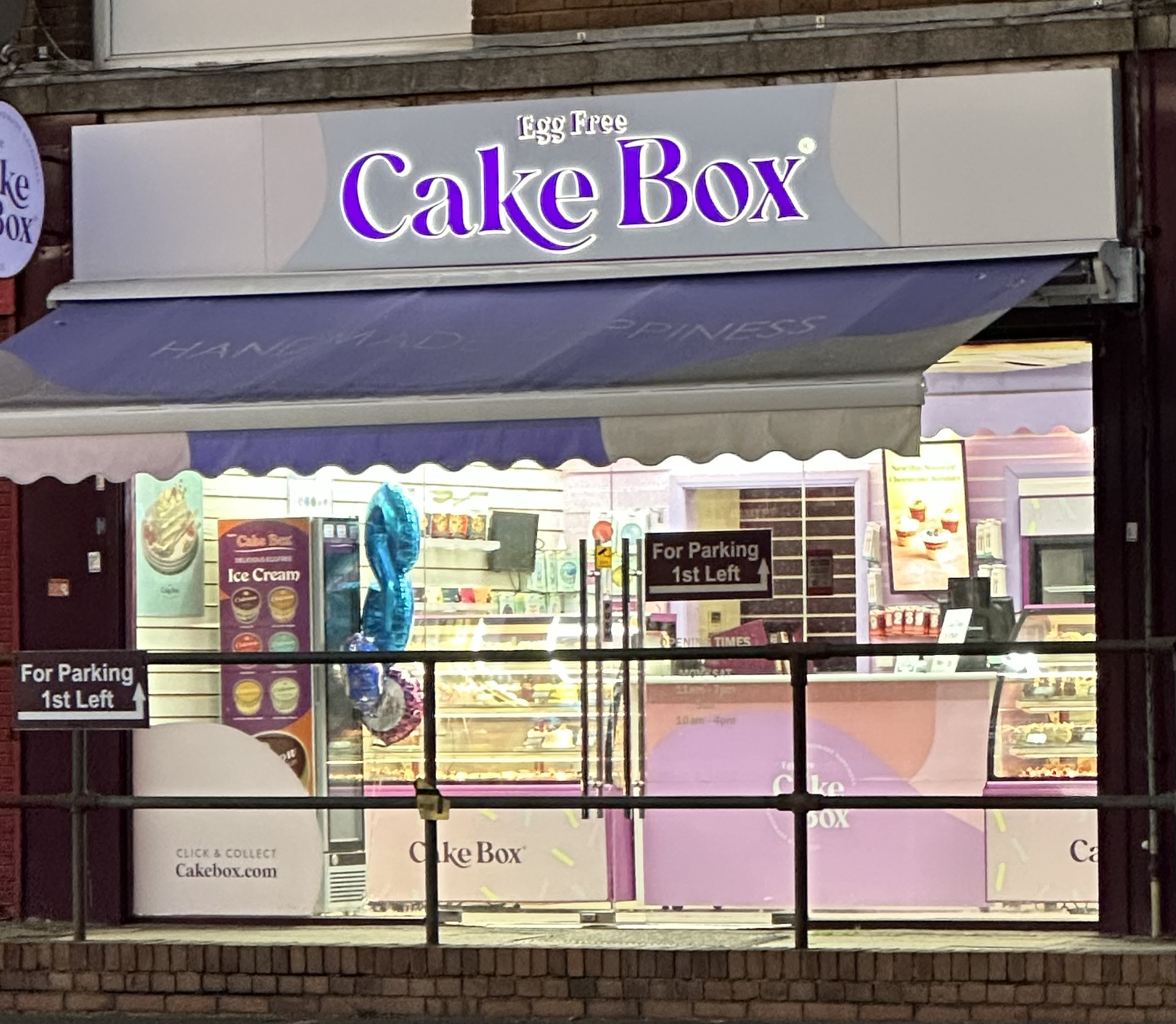
  A Cake Box store in Strood, Kent
  It was founded in 2008 by Sukh Chamdal. In 2018 it was listed on the London Stock Exchange's Alternative Investment Market (AIM). In 2025, Cake Box acquired Ambala Foods who produce Asian sweets (Mithai).
- Cake Entertainment – is a TV series production and distribution company specialising in children's programmes. Established in 2002, its headquarters is in London.
- Cala Group (Holdings) Limited – is a house building company. It was founded in 1875 as the City of Aberdeen Land Association. In 2014 it acquired Banner Homes. In 2018 it was acquired by Legal & General. In September 2024, Cala was sold to investment firms Patron Capital and Sixth Street Partners.
- Caledonia Investments plc – is an investment trust headquartered in London. It originated in 1928 as The Foreign Railways Investment Trust Ltd. The Cayzer family acquired it in 1951 to hold their business interests, and it was renamed Caledonia Investments. In 2003 it was converted into an investment trust company.
- Caledonian Railway – was a railway company established in 1845 that operated from 1847 to 1923.
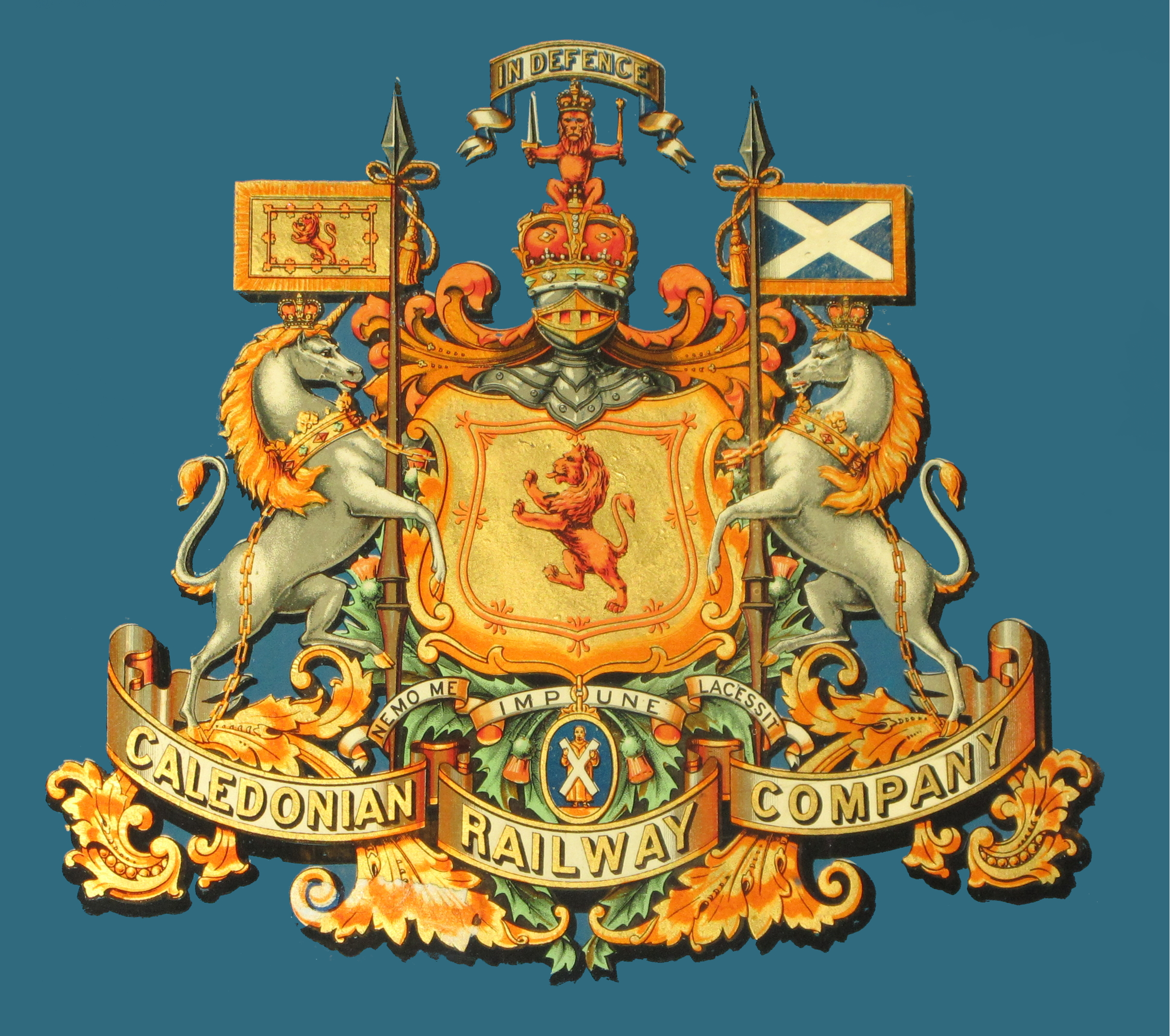
  Caledonian Railway coat of arms
- Caledonian and Dumbartonshire Junction Railway – was a railway company established in 1846 that operated from 1850 to 1862.
- Callander and Oban Railway – was a railway company established in 1865 that operated from 1866 to 1923.
- Cambrian Railways – was a railway company established in 1864 that operated from 1864 to 1922.
- Cambridge & Counties Bank – is a bank offering property finance, asset finance, specialist car finance, and savings accounts for small to medium-sized businesses and credit unions. Headquartered in Leicester, Leicestershire; it was founded in 2012. It is owned by Trinity Hall and Cambridgeshire Local Government Pension Scheme.
- Cambridge Water Company – is a utility company supplying water. Established in 1853, it is now part of South Staffordshire Water.
- Camelot Group – was a lottery company that operated from 1994 to 2024. It was headquartered in Watford.
- Cannock Mineral Railway – was a railway company established in 1855 that operated from 1859 to 1869.
- Caparo Vehicle Technologies – was an automotive and aerospace design and engineering and sports car production company. It operated from 2006 to 2019.
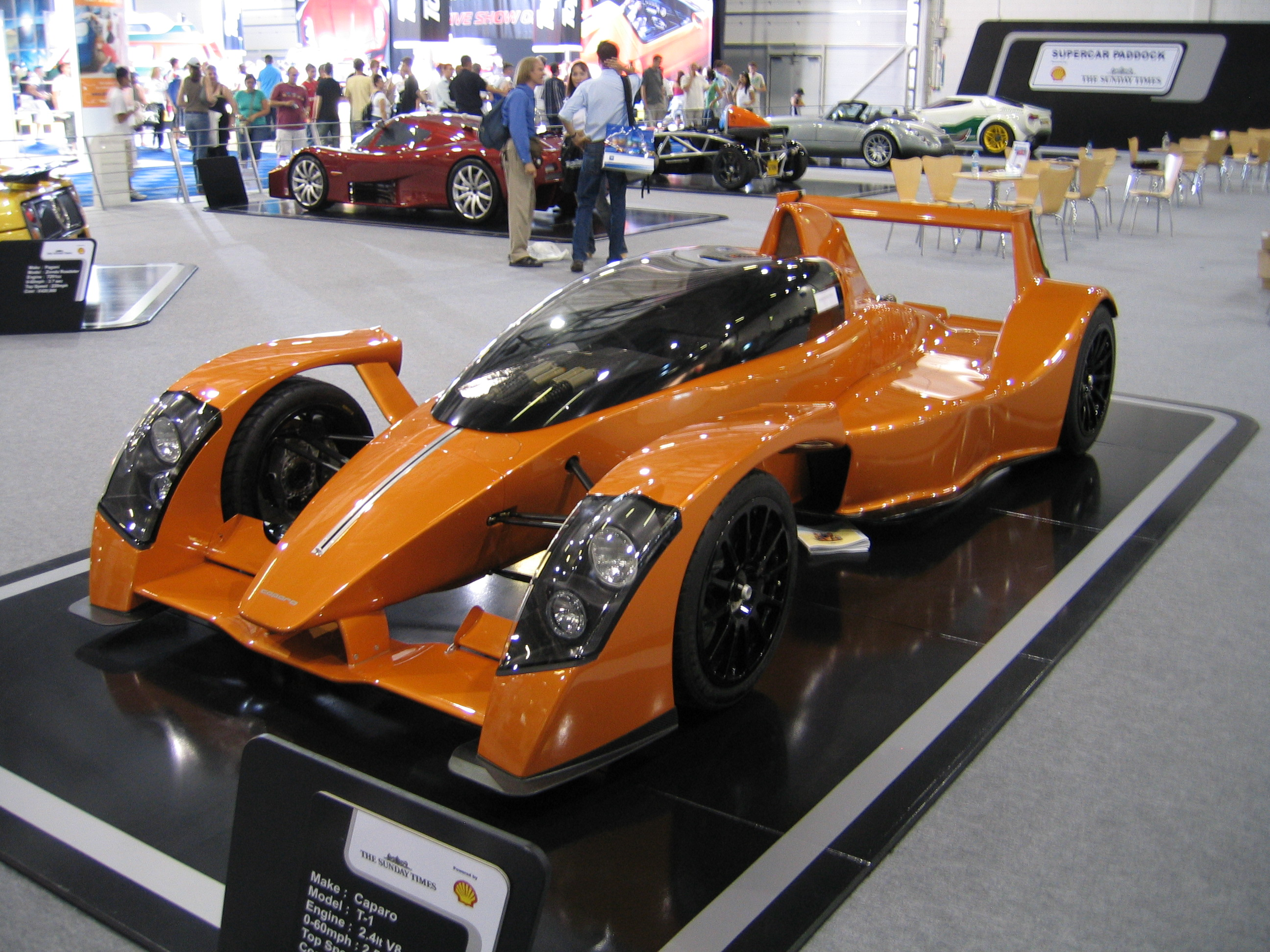
  Caparo T1 in 2006
- Capita – is an international business process outsourcing and professional services company fulfilling contracts from central government, local government, and the private sector. Headquartered in London it was founded in 1984 as a division of the Chartered Institute of Public Finance and Accountancy.
  Capita logo
  In 1987 it was the subject of a management buyout and in 1991 it was listed on the London Stock Exchange. It operates in defence, education, health, financial services, retail, telecommunications and media, utilities, investment, consultancy and administration.
- Capital Gearing Trust plc – is an investment trust established in 1973. Since 1982 it has been managed by Capitol Gearing Asset Management, an employee ownership trust.
- Capitol Films – was a film production and distribution company that operated from 1989 to 2013.
- Card Factory – is a company that operates a retail store chain and retail websites offering greetings cards, calendars, and small gifts. It also produces cards and calendars.
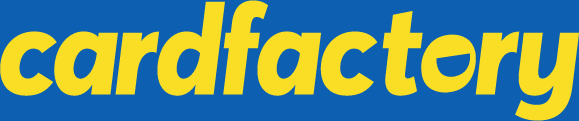
  Cardiff Factory logo
  It is headquartered in Wakefield, West Yorkshire. It was founded in 1997 by Dean and Janet Hoyle. In 2010 it was acquired by Charterhouse Capital Partners, and in 2014 it was floated on the London Stock Exchange. In 2025 it acquired rival card business Funky Pigeon.
- Cardiff Railway – was a docks and railway company established in 1897 that operated from 1897 to 1923.
- Carillion – was a British multinational construction, civil engineering, and facilities management company headquartered in Wolverhampton. It was founded in 1999 by a demerger from Tarmac of its construction and professional services businesses. Through a number of acquisitions it became the second largest construction company in the UK. After experiencing severe financial difficulties it was liquidated in 2018.
- Carmarthenshire Railway or Tramroad – was a dock and railway company established in 1802 that operated from 1803 to 1844.
- Carnival Films (Carnival Films & Television Ltd) – is a television and film production company headquartered in London. It has also produced some theatre productions. It was founded in 1978 by television producers Brian Eastman and Leszek Burzynski. Its programmes include: Downton Abbey, Agatha Christie's Poirot, Jeeves and Wooster, The Day of the Jackal, Whitechapel, The Last Kingdom, and Hotel Babylon. Its previous names are: Batway (1978–1979), Picture Partnership Productions (1979–1990), Carnival (Films and theatre) (1990–2007). In 2007 Southern Star acquired 75% of the company until it was acquired by NBCUniversal in 2008 and became part of NBCUniversal International Television Productions.
- Carpetright – is a multinational company that operates a retail store chain and retail website offering carpets, other floor coverings, beds, mattresses, curtains, blinds, and artificial grass. It is headquartered in Purfleet, Essex. It was founded in 1988 by Philip Harris, Baron Harris of Peckham.
  Carpetright logo
  In 1993 it was floated on the London Stock Exchange. In 2019/2020 it was acquired by Meditor, and returned to private ownership. Its acquisitions include: Mays World of Carpets, Storey Carpets, and Sleepright UK. Since 2024 it has been a division of Tapi Carpets which purchased the Carpetright brand, intellectual property, and some locations.
- Castle Douglas and Dumfries Railway – was a railway company established in 1856 that operated from 1859 to 1865.
- Cater Allen – is a financial services company providing private banking. Established in 1816, its headquarters is in London. Its parent company is Santander Group.
- Caterham Cars – is an automobile company manufacturing sports cars and F1 cars. Established in 1973 at Caterham, Surrey, its headquarters is in Crawley, Sussex. It has also traded as Seven Cars Limited. In 2021 it was acquired by VT Holdings.
- Caterham Springwater Company – was a utility company supplying water. It operated from 1852 to 1885. In 1885 it was merged with Kenley Water Company to form the East Surrey Water Company.
- Catford Studios – was a film studio that operated from 1914 to 1921. Located in Catford, London, it was also known as Windsor Studios.
- Cathcart District Railway – was a railway company established in 1880 that operated from 1886 to 1923.
- CDC Group (Commonwealth Development Corporation) – is the former name of British International Investment which is a UK government owned emerging markets development finance company.
- C.D.S. (Superstores International) Ltd – is a home, garden and leisure products manufacturer and retailer trading as The Range. See The Range.
- Celltech – was a biotechnology company that operated from 1980 to 2004. Its headquarters was in Slough. In 1999 it was acquired by Chiroscience to briefly become Celltech Chiroscience. Celltech was acquired by UCB in 2004.
- Central Electricity Generating Board – was an electricity generation and transmission company that operated from 1957 to 2001. It began as a government owned body until it was privatised in the 1990s. Its headquarters was in London.
- Central London Railway – was a company established in 1889 to construct an underground electric railway in London. The line opened in 1900 between Bank and Shepherd's Bush. It was taken over by the Underground Electric Railways Company of London in 1913. It now forms part of the London Underground's Central line.
- Centrica – is a multinational energy company supplying electric and gas, as well as a services company. Established in 1997, its headquarters is in Windsor, Berkshire. It was formed when British Gas plc was split into Centrica, BG Group, and Transco. Its trading names include British Gas, Scottish Gas, Bord Gais Energy, and Phoenix Gas. In 2022 its revenue was £33.6 billion, with a net income loss of £636 million.
- Century 21 Productions - was a television and film production company. See AP Films.
- Century Building Society – was a building society providing financial services. It was based in Edinburgh, Scotland. It was founded in 1899 as The New Edinburgh Investment Building Society. In 1946 it was renamed Century Building Society. In 2013 it was merged with Scottish Building Society.
- Ceres Power Holdings – is an alternative energy company that develops solid oxide electrolyzer cells and solid oxide fuel cell technology for use in distributed power systems. Headquartered in Horsham; it was founded in 2001 as a spin-out from Imperial College London. It was first listed on the London Stock Exchange in 2004.
- CeX (Complete Entertainment eXchange; trading as CeX Entertainment Exchange) – is a multinational second hand retail store chain and retail website buying and selling technology, computer goods, video games, DVDs, cds, and providing technology repair. It is headquartered in Watford, Hertfordshire. It was founded in 1992 in London as 'Computer Exchange'. The store chain is a mixture of franchises and centrally owned stores. In 2013 CeX Group founded 'Designer Exchange' as a second hand store chain buying and selling items such as luxury leather goods, jewellery, and handbags.
- Channel Four Television Corporation – is a UK government owned public service broadcaster and media company that owns and operates six television channels, a television streaming service, and Film4 Productions - its film development and financing unit. Its television channels are: Channel 4, E4, E4 Extra, More4, Film4 and 4seven. The corporation receives no public funding and is financed entirely by its commercial activities - mainly advertising. It is headquartered at the Majestic, Leeds. It was preceded by the Channel Four Television Company which was established in 1980 as a subsidiary of the Independent Broadcasting Authority with Channel 4 launching on 2 November 1982. Its remit required the provision of programming for minority groups and in its first years it also provided programmes on contemporary art as well as more mainstream programming. The 1990 Broadcasting Act abolished the IBA and established the Channel Four Television Corporation which became operational in 1993 to own and operate the channel with greater autonomy. It went on to expand its other operations with five extra channels, a streaming service, and a film development and finance unit. From 1982 to 2024 its broadcasting licence required it to be a 'publisher broadcaster' with all of its programming commissioned or bought from independent companies. The 2024 Media Act permits Channel 4 to produce its own programming for the first time although 35% must be made by independent companies. Channel 4 Television Corporation announced that it would set up a separate television production company. It also committed to sourcing at least 50% of its programming outside London. Its transmission and playout operations are outsourced to Red Bee Media.
- Channel Four Films – was the former name of Film4 Productions.
- Channel 5 Broadcasting – is a media company that owns and operates the television channels 5, 5Action, 5Select, 5Star, and 5USA as well as a streaming service. It is headquartered in London. It was founded as a consortium of four investors: Pearson, United News and Media, CLT-Ufa and Warburg Pincus which in 1995 was awarded the licence to run Channel 5. It was incorporated in 1996. Its remit required 50% of its programming to be original and a quota was set for public service content. The company had to retune the UK's video recorders to avoid interference on the same frequencies allocated to Channel 5. On 30 March 1997 Channel 5 was launched. In 2005 RTL became sole owner until 2010 when it sold the company to Northern & Shell. In 2014 it was acquired by Viacom which became part of Paramount Skydance in 2022 with Channel 5 Broadcasting as a subsidiary of its UK and Australia division Paramount Networks UK & Australia. Channel 5 has been rebranded as 5.
- Channel X – is a television production company specialising in comedy, drama, and factual programmes. Headquartered in London; it was founded in 1987 by Jonathan Ross and Alan Marke. Its productions include: Saturday Zoo, Vic Reeves Big Night Out, Shooting Stars, So Awkward and Detectorists. Its subsidiaries are Channel X North based in Manchester, and Channel X Hopscotch based in Scotland for Scottish productions.
- Charge Automotive – was the former name of electric vehicle manufacturing company Arrival.
- Charing Cross, Euston and Hampstead Railway Company – was a company established in 1891 to construct an underground railway line in London between the three locations in its name. After being taken over by the Underground Electric Railways Company of London in 1900, the line was constructed and opened in 1906. It now forms part of the London Underground's Northern line.
- Charles Church Developments – is an upmarket house building company headquartered in York, North Yorkshire. It was founded in 1965 by Charles JG Church as Burke and Church. In 1972 it was renamed Charles Church Developments. It acquired County Homes in 1987. In 1996 it was acquired by Beazer Group plc. In 2001 Beazer was acquired by Persimmon plc which retained Charles Church Developments as a subsidiary.
- Charles Urban Trading Company – was a film production company that operated from 1903 to 1914/1918. Its headquarters was in London.
- Charlotte Street Partners – is a communications company. Established in 2014, its headquarters is in Edinburgh.
- Chartered Bank of India, Australia and China – was a multinational British banking company that operated from 1853 to 1969. Its headquarters was in London. In 1969 it was merged with Standard Bank Limited to form Standard Chartered Bank.
- Chelsea Waterworks Company – was a utility company supplying water that operated from 1723 to 1902. Headquartered in London, it became part of the Metropolitan Water Board.
- Chelsham and Woldingham Water Company – was a utility company supplying water that operated from 1884 to 1930. It became part of East Surrey Water Company.
- Chemring Group plc – is a manufacturer of advanced technology products for the aerospace, defence, and security markets. It is headquartered in Romsey, Hampshire. It was founded in 1905 as The British, Foreign & Colonial Automatic Light Controlling Company which manufactured timers for gas street lightings. In 1974 it was floated on the London Stock Exchange. It has made a number of acquisitions in the UK, US, and continental Europe. Its subsidiaries include Roke Manor Research. In 2022 its revenue was £442 million, with a net income of £47 million.
- Chesnara – is a life assurance and pensions company headquartered in Preston. It was founded in 2004 from the demerger of the life assurance business of Countrywide. Its acquisitions include: City of Westminster Assurance, Save & Prosper, Robein Leven, the UK bonds and pension business of Canada Life and HSBC Life (UK).
- Chester and Holyhead Railway – was a railway company established in 1844 that operated from 1850 to 1859.
- Chester Waterworks Company – was a utility company supplying water that operated from 1838 to 1997. Headquartered in Chester, it was formerly known as the City of Chester Waterworks Company. In 1997 it became part of Dee Valley Water.
- Child & Co. – was a financial services company providing private banking and wealth management. Formerly a goldsmiths, it was established in 1664 and was the oldest bank in the U.K. Headquartered in London, it became a brand of the Royal Bank of Scotland until 2022.
- Children's Film Unit – was a film production company that operated from 1981 to 2011.
- Chime Communications Limited – is a marketing services company. Established in 1989, its headquarters is in London.
- Chiroscience – was a biotechnology company that operated from 1991 to 1999. In 1996 it was merged with Darwin Molecular Corporation. In 1999 it was acquired by Celltech who, in 2004, were acquired by UCB.
- C. Hoare & Co (also known as Hoares) – is a private bank offering mortgages, savings, and loans to mainly high-net-worth clients. Headquartered in London; it was founded in 1672 by Sir Richard Hoare and is still owned by his descendants.
- Cholderton and District Water Company – is a utility company supplying water. It was established in 1904.
- Chorion – was a media, film and TV production and distribution company. It operated from 1998 to 2012.
- Chorley and District Building Society (trading as Chorley Building Society) – is a building society offering mortgages, savings, and insurance. It is headquartered in Chorley, Lancashire. It was founded in 1859 as The Chorley Permanent Benefit Building Society and was incorporated in 1874.
- Churchill Mining – is a coal mining company. Established in 2005, its headquarters is in London.
- Cineguild Productions – was a film production company that operated from 1944 to 1951.
- Cineworld – is an international cinema chain company. Established in 1995, its headquarters is in London. In 2022 its revenue was £1.8 billion, with a net income loss of £565 million.
- Cirkle – is a public relations company. Established in 1986, its headquarters is in Beaconsfield. In 2022 it was acquired by Accordience.
- CiteAb – is a biotechnology and life sciences data company that provides a search engine for research antibodies. Established in 2014, its headquarters is in Bath, Somerset.
- City and South London Railway – was a railway company established in 1883 to construct the world's first deep tunnel electric underground railway in London. The line opened in 1890 between Stockwell and King William Street and was taken over by the Underground Electric Railways Company of London in 1913. It now forms part of the London Underground's Northern line.
- City of Glasgow Union Railway – was a railway company established in 1864 that operated from 1870 to circa 1896.
- City of London Investment Trust plc – is an investment trust focused on UK equities. Headquartered in London, it is listed on both the London Stock Exchange and the New Zealand Stock Exchange. It was founded in 1861 as the City of London Brewery Company Ltd in order to acquire Calverts (a brewery in the City of London). In 1932 it was renamed The City of London Brewery and Investment Trust Ltd to reflect that parts of the business had been sold and the proceeds invested in securities. In 1968 the remnants of the brewery business were sold in order to focus solely on investment. It is managed by Janus Henderson.
- Clarks – is an international shoe manufacturer and retailer. It operates a multinational shoe store chain that is a mixture of company owned stores and franchises, as well as a retail website. It is headquartered in Street, Somerset. It was founded in 1825–1828 by brothers Cyrus and James Clark. Later in the 19th century the shoe making process was automated. Also, the business funded a number of social initiatives in Street such as a school, theatre, library, swimming pool, and town hall. In 1903 it was incorporated. In 1937 it acquired the Abbotts store chain and used the retail brand name 'Peter Lord'. In the 1970s it acquired 'Ravel, Pint and Mondaine' and 'K shoes'. The Clark family ran the company until 1993, and owned it until 2020 when LionRock Capital took overall control. In 2021 Viva China Holdings (renamed Viva Goods Co. Ltd) took control of LionRock Capital including Clarks.
- Clarkson plc – is a provider of shipping services including shipbroking, finance, support, and research. It is headquartered in London. It was founded in 1852 by Horace Anderton Clarkson. In 2022 its revenue was £603 million, with a net income of £79 million.
- ClearStory – is a television and podcast production company specialising in documentaries. Headquartered in London; it was founded in 2010 by the film-makers Russell Barnes and Molly Milton. Its programmes include: Long Shadow, Gypsy Blood and Sex Box.
- Clearwater Features – was a film and television production company that operated from 1979 to 1990. Its headquarters was in London.
- Cleator and Workington Junction Railway – was a railway company established in 1876 that operated from 1879 to 1923.
- Cleobury Mortimer and Ditton Priors Light Railway – was a railway company established in 1901 that operated from 1908 to 1922.
- Clerical Medical – is a financial services company providing life insurance, pensions, and investment. Established in 1824, its headquarters is in London. It was formerly known as the Medical, Clerical and General Life Assurance Society. Its parent company is Lloyds Banking Group.
- Clerkenwell Films – is a television and film production company based in London. It was founded in 1998 by the television producer Murray Ferguson and actor John Hannah. Its productions include: The Death of Bunny Munro, Baby Reindeer, Truelove, Misfits, Lovesick and Persuasion. In 2021 the company was acquired by BBC Studios and became its subsidiary.
- Clifton and Kersley Coal Company – was a coal mining company that operated from 1861 to 1929. It became part of Manchester Collieries.
- Clinton Cards Ltd (trading as Clintons) – is a company that operates a retail store chain and retail website offering greetings cards, soft toys, and small gifts. It also produces cards and other items. It is headquartered in Loughton, Essex. It was founded in 1968 by Don Lewin. In 1988 it was floated on the London Stock Exchange. In 2004 it acquired Birthdays Ltd. In 2012 it went private again and from 2012 to 2018 it was owned by American Greetings; from 2018 to 2019 by the Weiss family; and from 2019 by Esquire Retail Ltd.
- Close Brothers Group plc – is a merchant banking company that provides lending, takes deposits, manages wealth, and trades in securities. It is headquartered in London. It was founded in 1878 by William Brooks Close and his brothers Fred and James Close in Sioux City, Iowa, US. In 2022 its revenue was £936 million, with a net income of £165 million.
- Cloud Eight Films – is a film and television production company. Established in 2009, its headquarters is in London.
- Clydesdale Bank – is a retail and commercial bank based in Scotland that was established in 1838 in Glasgow. Since 2018 it is part of Virgin Money UK and mainly trades as Virgin Money.
- CMC Markets – is a financial services company offering online trading in shares, spread betting, CFDs, and foreign exchange. Headquartered in London; it was founded in 1989 by Peter Cruddas as Currency Management Corporation.
- Coalite Company – was a coke, petrol, and oils production company that operated from 1917 to 2004. Established in London, its headquarters was in Bolsover. It was also known as The Coalite Chemicals Company.
- Coats Group – is a British multinational consumer and intermediate goods company. Its products include: apparel, accessory, and footwear threads, structural components for footwear and accessories, fabrics, yarns, and software applications. Headquartered in London; it was founded in 1755 as a loom equipment and silk thread business.
- Coca-Cola Europacific Partners – is a multinational bottling company headquartered in Uxbridge, London. It was founded in 2016 following the merger of the three main bottling companies for The Coca-Cola Company in Western Europe. In 2021 it acquired Coca-Cola Amatil to form Coca-Cola Europacific Partners.
- Cocoa Mountain – is a producer of chocolate confectionery. It also operates two cafes. Headquartered in Durness, Scotland; it was founded in 2006 by James Findlay and Paul Maden.
- Cockermouth and Workington Railway – was a railway company established in 1845 that operated from 1847 to 1866.
- Cockermouth, Keswick and Penrith Railway – was a railway company established in 1861 that operated from 1864 to 1923.
- Codex Pictures – was a film production company that operated from 2008 to 2013. Its headquarters was in London.
- Colne Valley Water – was a utility company supplying water. It operated from 1873 to 1994. In 1994 it was merged into Three Valleys Water.
- Comben Homes – was a house building company. It was founded in 1907 by James White Comben and William Henry Wakeling as Comben & Wakeling. In 1972 it acquired Ryedale Homes and was renamed Comben Group, trading as Comben Homes. In 1984 it was acquired by Trafalgar House and became part of its Ideal Homes house building operation.
- The Comedy Unit – is a Scottish television and radio production company specialising in comedy. Its productions include: Naked Video, Rab C. Nesbitt, Only an Excuse?, Still Game, Fags, Mags and Bags and Scot Squad. Headquartered in Glasgow, Scotland; it was founded in 1983 by Colin Gilbert as a department of the BBC. It became an independent company in 1996. It was acquired by RDF Media Group in 2006 which was itself acquired by Zodiak Entertainment in 2010. Zodiak was acquired by the Banijay Group in 2016 with The Comedy Unit continuing as a subsidiary.
- Comeleon - was the former name of Tanfield Group.
- Company of Mineral and Battery Works – was a metal, mining, and wire works company that operated from 1565 to c1750.
- Company Pictures – is a television and film production company specialising in drama. Headquartered in London; it was founded in 1998 by Charles Pattinson and George Faber, colleagues at BBC Films. In 2003 it was acquired by All3Media and in 2026 became part of Banijay UK Productions through the merger of All3Media into Banijay Entertainment.
- Compass Group – is a British multinational contract food service, cleaning, and facilities management company. Established in 1941, its headquarters is in Chertsey. It was formerly known as Factory Canteens Limited, and Bateman Catering. In 2022 its revenue was £25.1 billion, with a net income of £1.1 billion.
- Computacenter plc – is a multinational provider of computer services to the public-sector and private-sector. It is involved in the supply, implementation, support, and management of information technology systems. It is headquartered in Hatfield, Hertfordshire. It was founded in 1981 by Philip Hulme and Peter Ogden. In 2022 its revenue was £6.4 billion, with a net income of £184 million.
- Computer Film Company – was a film visual effects company. Established in 1986, its headquarters was in London. In 1997 it was merged with Framestore.
- Connells Group – is an estate agency and property services company headquartered in Leighton Buzzard. It was founded in 1936. In 2010 it was acquired by Skipton Building Society. In 2021 it acquired Countrywide.
- Consolidated Gold Fields – was a gold mining company that operated from 1887 to 1988. Headquartered in London, it was acquired by Hanson.
- Convatec – is a medical devices company. Established in 1978, its headquarters is in Reading, Berkshire. It was formerly a division of E.R. Squibb & Sons, Inc. In 2022 its revenue was $2 billion, with a net income of $62 million.
- Co-op Energy – is an energy company supplying electricity. Established in 2010, its headquarters is in Warwick. Its parent company is The Midcounties Co-operative. In 2019 it entered an operating partnership with Octopus Energy.
- Co-op Funeralcare – is the trading name of Funeral Services Ltd, a provider of funeral services.
- The Co-operative Bank plc – is a financial services company offering banking services. Established in 1872, its headquarters is in Manchester. It was first formed as the Loan and Deposit Department of the Co-operative Wholesale Society. In 2009, it merged with the Britannia Building Society. In 2018, it had an operating income of £369 million. It is owned by The Co-operative Bank Holdings Ltd.
- The Co-operative Banking Group – was a financial services company offering banking and insurance services that operated from 2002 to 2013. Its headquarters was in Manchester. Formerly known as Co-operative Financial Services, its subsidiaries were The Co-operative Bank and Co-op Insurance Services Ltd. Its parent company was The Co-operative Group. In 2013 the group structure was reconfigured.
- The Co-operative Group – trading as Co-op is a consumers' co-operative retail group offering food, e-pharmacy, insurance services, legal services, funeral care, and land and property management. Established in 1844, its headquarters is One Angel Square, Manchester. First established as the Rochdale Society of Equitable Pioneers, in 1872 it became The Co-operative Wholesale Society. In 2020 its revenue was £11.5 billion, with a net income of £77 million.
- Co-op Insurance Services Ltd – is an insurance services company. Established in 1867, its headquarters is at CIS Tower, Manchester. Its parent company is The Co-operative Group.
- Co-op Legal Services – is a legal services company. Established in 2006, its headquarters is in Manchester. Its parent company is The Co-operative Group.
- Co-operative Retail Trading Group – was the central buying group for co-operative retail societies in the United Kingdom. It operated from 1993 to 2015 when it was succeeded by Federal Retail Trading Services. Headquartered in Manchester, it was managed by The Co-operative Group.
- Co-op Wholesale – is a retail and wholesale co-operative grocery company that runs the Co-op Food and Nisa branded franchises. Established in 1977 as Northern Independent Supermarkets Association, it was later named Nisa-Today, then Nisa Retail Limited and finally Co-op Wholesale. It is headquartered in Scunthorpe, North Lincolnshire. Its parent company is The Co-operative Group.
- Cooper Car Company – is a manufacturer of racing cars, and sports cars. Established in 1947, its headquarters is in Surbiton, Surrey.
- COPA90 – is a football media company. Headquartered in London, it was founded in 2012. It was previously named Bigballs Media.
- Coral – is a gambling company. Established in 1926, its headquarters is in London. It is owned by Entain plc.
- Corbyn, Stacey & Company – was a pharmaceuticals, and retail chemists company that operated from 1726 to 1927. It was headquartered in London.
- Cordiant Digital Infrastructure – is an investment trust company focused on infrastructure related to the digital economy. Headquartered in St. Peter Port, Guernsey; it was founded in 2021 by Cordiant Capital.
- Cornwall Minerals Railway – was a railway company established in 1873 that operated from 1874 to 1896.
- Cornwall Railway – was a railway company established in 1846 that operated from 1859 to 1889.
- Cornish Orchards Ltd – is a cider and juice producer based in Duloe, Cornwall. It was founded in 2003 by Andy Atkinson. Since 2019 it is owned by Asahi Group Holdings Ltd.
- Corris Railway – was a railway company established in 1864 that operated from 1864 to 1929.
- Costa Coffee – is a multinational coffee-house chain. Established in 1971 in London, its headquarters is in Loudwater, Buckinghamshire. It was acquired by Whitbread in 1995, then by Coca-Cola in 2019.
- Costain Group – is a construction and engineering company headquartered in London. It has two divisions: Natural Resources (infrastructure for the water, energy, defence, and nuclear energy sectors) and Transportation (infrastructure for the road, rail, and integrated transport sectors). It was founded in 1865 by Richard Costain and Richard Kneen as a builders business. In the 20th century into the 21st it moved from house building and mining to civil engineering, and commercial construction.
- Countryside Partnerships plc – is a house building company headquartered in Brentwood, Essex. It was founded in 1958. In 2014 it was merged with Millgate. In 2022 its name was changed from Countryside Properties to Countryside Partnerships. In June 2022 it was acquired by Inclusive Capital Partners (In-Cap), and then in November it was acquired by Vistry Group plc.
- Countrywide – is an estate agency company with over 600 estate agency or letting offices operating under more than fifty brands. Headquartered in Chelmsford; it was founded in 1986 as Hambro Countrywide. In 1988 it expanded into life assurance. In 1998 it was demerged from Hambro and renamed Countrywide Assured. In 2004 its life assurance business was demerged as Chesnara and it was renamed Countrywide. In 2021 it was acquired by Connells Group which is a subsidiary of Skipton Building Society.
- Coutts & Company – is a financial services company offering private banking and wealth management. Established in 1692, its headquarters is in London. Its parent company is NatWest Holdings which is owned by the NatWest Group. In 2018 its revenue was £681 million, with a net income of £268 million.
- Cove Energy plc – was an oil and gas exploration company that operated from 2009 to 2012. Its headquarters was in London. In 2012 it was acquired by PTT Exploration and Production.
- Coventry Building Society – is a building society offering mortgages, savings, and banking. It is headquartered in Coventry, West Midlands. It was founded in 1884 by Thomas Mason Daffern and became the Coventry Permanent Economic Building Society. It was later renamed the 'Coventry Economic' and then the 'Coventry Building Society'. Its acquisitions include: the Coventry & District Permanent Money Society in 1970, the Stourbridge, Lye & District Permanent Building Society in 1976, the Coventry Provident Building Society in 1983, and the Stroud & Swindon Building Society in 2010.
- Cow & Gate – was a manufacturer of dairy products, and babyfood. Established in 1882, its headquarters was in Guildford, Surrey. It was formerly known as West Surrey Dairy, and West Surrey Central Dairy Company Limited. In 1959 it merged with United Dairies to form Unigate which became Uniq plc and was acquired by Greencore. The Cow & Gate brand continues as a specialist baby food brand, owned by Danone.
- Cowes and Newport Railway – was a railway company established in 1859 that operated from 1862 to 1887 when it was merged with the Ryde and Newport Railway and the Isle of Wight (Newport Junction) Railway to form the Isle of Wight Central Railway.
- CPL Productions – is a television and radio production company headquartered in Long Acre, London. Its productions include: Who Wants to Be a Millionaire?, A League of Their Own, Married at First Sight and You Are What You Eat. It had a film division with productions including Slumdog Millionaire and Dirty Pretty Things before it was sold off in 2024. It also owned a number of UK local radio stations until they were sold off in 2019. The company was founded in 1979 as Grantvenus, then renamed Celador Productions in December 1979. It was the subject of a management buyout in 2007, and renamed CPL Productions in 2009. It was acquired in 2012 by ProSiebenSat.1 Media's Red Arrow Studios which became Seven.One Studios with CPL Productions continuing as a subsidiary.
- Cranswick plc – is a food producer and supplier of mainly meat products. It is headquartered in Hull. It was founded in 1974 by a number of Yorkshire farmers as a pig feed producer named Cranswick Mill. Diversifying into food production, it now breeds and rears pigs for its products. Its brands include Bodega, Weight Watchers, Woodall's, Simply Sausages, Red Lion Foods, and The Black Farmer. In 2022 its revenue was £2 billion, with a net income of £103 million.
- Crest Nicholson plc – is a house building company headquartered in Weybridge, Surrey. It was founded in 1963 by Bryan Skinner as Crest Homes. A number of unrelated acquisitions included the yacht maker Camper & Nicholsons leading to the renaming as Crest Nicholson. In 2022 its revenue was £913 million, with a net income of £26 million.
- Cricklewood Studios – was a film studios that operated from 1920 to 1938. Located in London, it was also known as Stoll Film Studios.
- Crieff and Comrie Railway – was a railway company established in 1890 that operated from 1893 to 1898.
- Crieff and Methven Junction Railway – was a railway company established in 1864 that operated from 1866 to 1868/1869.
- Crieff Junction Railway – was a railway company established in 1853 that operated from 1856 to 1865.
- Croda International plc – is a chemicals company that produces consumer and industrial products. Established in 1925, its headquarters is in Snaith, East Riding of Yorkshire. In 2022 its revenue was £2 billion, with a net income of £653 million.
- Cromarty and Dingwall Light Railway – was a railway company established in 1902 that operated from 1914 to 1920.
- Crookes Healthcare – is a manufacturer of healthcare products and pharmaceuticals. Established in 1918 in London, its headquarters is in Lenton, Nottingham. It was formerly known as Crookes Collosols, and The Crookes Laboratories. In 1960 it was acquired by Arthur Guinness Son and Company, then in 1971 it was acquired by Boots, and, in 2006, it was acquired by Reckitt Benckiser.
- Crosby Homes – was a house building company headquartered in Solihull, West Midlands. It was founded in the mid-1920s by James Crosby. In 1986 the Crosby family accepted a management buyout. In 1991 it was acquired by Berkeley Group Holdings who, in 2003, sold it to its management. In 2005 it was acquired by Lendlease and renamed Crosby Lend Lease.
- Crosslé Car Company – is a racing car manufacturing company. Established in 1957, its headquarters is in Holywood, Northern Ireland.
- Crown Film Unit – was a government-owned film production company that operated from 1940 to 1952. It was formerly the GPO Film Unit.
- Cumberland Building Society (trading as The Cumberland) – is a building society offering mortgages, savings, banking, investments, and insurance. It is headquartered in Carlisle, Cumbria. It was founded in 1850 as a freehold land society named the Cumberland Co-operative Land and Benefit Building Society. Its subsidiaries include: Cumberland Estate Agents, and Borderway Finance.
- Currys plc – is a multinational electrical and telecommunications retail and services company. It was established in 2014 by the merger of Dixons Retail and Carphone Warehouse Group to form Dixons Carphone. Its headquarters is in London. In 2021 it was renamed Currys plc and the Currys brand also replaced the PC World, Team Knowhow and Carphone Warehouse brands. In 2022 its revenue was £10.1 billion, with a net income of £222 million.
- Curzon Cinemas – is a cinema chain, film distributor, and video on demand company. It was established in 1934. In 2019 it was acquired by Cohen Media Group. Its subsidiary is Curzon Film.
- CVS Group – is a veterinary services company headquartered in Diss. It was founded in 1999. Since 2020 it is the largest veterinary business in the UK.

== D ==
- Darktrace plc – is a cybersecurity company headquartered in Cambridge, Cambridgeshire and San Francisco US. It was founded through cooperation between British intelligence agencies and Invoke Capital (owned by Mike Lynch). In 2022 it was floated on the London Stock Exchange. Its revenue for 2022 was $415 million, with a net income of $1.5 million.
- Darlington Building Society – is a building society offering mortgages, savings, and banking. Headquartered in Darlington, County Durham; it was founded in 1856.
- Darrall Macqueen – is an independent children's television production company based in London. Its productions include: Smile, Bear Behaving Badly, Teletubbies (2015–2018), Chip and Potato and Waffle the Wonder Dog. It was founded in 2000 by ex-Disney executives Billy Macqueen and Maddy Darrall. In 2005 Southern Star acquired the company before they were themselves acquired by Southern Cross Broadcasting who in turn were acquired by Fairfax Media. When Endemol acquired Fairfax in 2009 Billy Macqueen and Maddy Darrall bought back the company to be run as an independent under their shared ownership.
- Dartington Crystal – is a manufacturer of crystal glassware using traditional glassblowing methods. As well as the Dartington Crystal brand, they also own and market the Caithness Glass and Royal Brierley Crystal brands. It is headquartered in Great Torrington, Devon. It was founded in 1967 by the Dartington Hall Trust to aid economic regeneration of the region. After several ownership changes, it was the subject of a management buyout in 2006.
- David Lloyd Leisure Ltd – is a company that operates a multinational chain of health clubs. Headquartered in Hatfield, Hertfordshire; it was founded in 1982 by David Lloyd. In 1995 it was acquired by Whitbread plc; then in 2007 by London & Regional Properties and Bank of Scotland who merged it with Next Generation Clubs. In 2013 it was acquired by TDR Capital.
- Davrian Developments – was an automobile manufacturing company that operated from 1967 to 1983. It was headquartered in Clapham, London, then Tregaron, Wales, and then Lampeter, Wales.
- DB Cargo UK (formerly 'DB Schenker Rail UK' and 'English, Welsh & Scottish Railway') – is a rail freight company owned by Deutsche Bahn. Established in 1995, it is headquartered in Doncaster.
- Dearne Valley Railway – was a railway company established in 1897 that operated from 1902 to 1922.
- Debenhams plc – was a company that operated a department store chain offering clothing, beauty products, household items, furniture, and formerly food. It also had instore restaurants, provided store card and credit card services, offered insurance products, and had a retail website. It was headquartered in London. It was founded in 1778 by William Clark as a London draper's store. In 1813 William Debenham became a partner and it was renamed 'Clark & Debenham'. Its product range was expanded and new shops opened. It was renamed: 'Debenham, Pooley & Smith', then 'Debenham, Son & Freebody' in the 1850s, then 'Debenham & Hewitt' in 1876. In 1905 it was incorporated as Debenhams Ltd. In 1927 it acquired the Drapery Trust, and in 1928 it was floated on the London Stock Exchange. By 1948 it had become the biggest department store chain in the UK. In 1986 it was acquired by the Burton Group. In 1998 it was demerged from the Burton Group, and in 2003 was acquired by Baroness Retail Ltd which was a consortium of investment companies and Debenhams management. In 2020 it went into administration and then liquidation so that it was defunct in 2021. In 2021 Boohoo acquired the Debenhams brand and website but not the stores. The franchised store chain of Debenhams in the Middle East which is owned by Alshaya Group is still trading.
- Dechra Pharmaceuticals plc – is a pharmaceutical company that develops and markets veterinary medicine products. It is headquartered in Northwich, Cheshire. It was founded in 1997 by a management buy-out from Lloyds Chemists. In 2023 it was acquired by EQT AB. In 2022 its revenue was £681 million, with a net income of £58 million.
- Deloitte – is a multinational professional services network. Headquartered in London; it was founded in 1845.
- Derwent Cumberland Pencil Company – was a pencil making company based in Keswick, Cumbria. It was founded in 1832 as Banks, Son & Co and renamed the Cumberland Pencil Company in 1916. In 1980 it was acquired by Rexel (now ACCO Brands) to become one of their brands. It produces pencils, paints, pastels, pens, and other art accessories.
- Derwent London plc – is a property investment and development company headquartered in London. It was established in 1984 by John Burns using Derwent Valley Holdings as a shell company. In 2007 it was merged with London Merchant Securities plc to form Derwent London. In 2022 its revenue was £248 million, with a net income loss of £280 million.
- Derwent Valley Water Board – was a state owned utility company supplying water that operated from 1899 to 1974. It was succeeded by Severn Trent Water Authority.
- Devon Valley Railway – was a railway company established in 1858 that operated from 1863 to 1875.
- DFS Furniture plc – is a company that operates a multinational furniture retail store chain and retail website, and is also a furniture manufacturer. It is headquartered in Doncaster, South Yorkshire. In 1969 Graham Kirkham founded Northern Upholstery. In 1983 Kirkham purchased DFS Furniture ltd which had been founded by the Hardy family, and renamed Northern Upholstery as 'DFS'. In 1993 it was floated on the London Stock Exchange before going private again in 2004. In 2010 it was acquired by Advent International. In 2015 it was floated on the London Stock Exchange again. Its acquisitions include: Sofa Workshop, Dwell, and Sofology.
- Diageo plc – is a British multinational alcoholic beverages company. Established in 1997, its headquarters is in Park Royal, London. Its brands include Smirnoff, Johnnie Walker, Baileys, Guinness, Captain Morgan, Tanqueray, and Gordon's Gin. It was formed from the merger of Guinness Brewery and Grand Metropolitan. In 2022 its revenue was £22.4 billion, with a net income of £3.3 billion.
- Dial-a-Phone – was a mobile phone retail company that operated from 1995 to 2014. Its headquarters was in Newcastle-under-Lyme, Staffordshire.
- Didcot, Newbury and Southampton Railway (formerly the 'Didcot, Newbury and Southampton Junction Railway') – was a railway company established in 1873 that operated from 1882 to 1923.
- Digital Cybercherries Ltd – is a video games developer company. It was established in 2015.
- Diploma plc – is a distributor of specialised technical products and services in the sectors of controls, seals, and life sciences. It is headquartered in London. It was founded in 1931 and was a distributor of electronic components, building products, and special steels. In 2022 its revenue was £1 billion, with a net income of £95 million.
- DiscoverIE Group plc - is an international designer and manufacturer of specialised electronic components for industrial use. It is headquartered in Guildford, Surrey. It was founded in 1986 by John Curry as Acal plc. In 2017 it was renamed discoverIE Group (short for discover Innovative Electronics). Its acquisitions include: BFI Opticals, Myrra Group, Trafo Holdings SA, and Foss As Fiberoptisk Systemsalg. In 2022 its revenue was £379 million, with a net income of £25 million.
- DNA Bioscience – was a biotechnology company offering a DNA paternity testing service. It operated from 2003 to 2005.
- DNA Films – is a film and television production company headquartered in London. It was founded in 1997 by Andrew Macdonald and Duncan Kenworthy. The television division with Walt Disney Television is named DNA TV Limited.
- DNEG – is a film visual effects, animation, and stereo conversion company. Established in 1998, its headquarters is in London. It was formerly known as Double Negative.
- Dobbies Garden Centres Ltd – is a company that operates a chain of garden centres, a number of which also include an in-store restaurant, and food hall. It also operates several tourist attractions such as Anker Wood. Headquartered in Lasswade, Midlothian, Scotland; it was founded in 1865 by James Dobbie as a seeds business. In 1997 it was floated on the London Stock Exchange. In 2007 it was acquired by Tesco plc who, in 2016, sold it to an investors group led by Midlothian Capital Partners, and Hattington Capital.
- Dolomite Bio – is a biotechnology company that creates products for high throughput single cell research. Established in 2016, its headquarters is in Royston, Hertfordshire. It is part of Blacktrace Holdings Ltd.
- Domino's Pizza Group plc – is a UK based master franchise of international pizza delivery chain Domino's. Headquartered in Milton Keynes, Buckinghamshire, it was founded in 1985. In 2011 it acquired a majority stake in the master franchise for Domino's in Germany. In 2012 it acquired Domino's Pizza Switzerland AG but sold it in 2021. In 2022 its revenue was £600 million, with a net income of £81 million.
- Done and Dusted – is a television production and event staging company headquartered in London, and Santa Monica, US. It has staged and filmed events such as: the Academy Awards, Primetime Emmy Awards, T4 on the Beach, Stand Up to Cancer (UK) and segments of the 2012 Summer Olympics opening ceremony. It was founded in 1998 by Hamish Hamilton, Ian Stewart and Simon Pizey. Since 2024 it is a subsidiary of Pantheon Media Group.
- Dorking Water Company – was a utility company supplying water that operated from 1869 to 1959. Headquartered in Dorking, Surrey, it became part of East Surrey Water Company.
- Dornoch Light Railway – was a railway company established in 1897 that operated from 1902 to 1923.
- Douglas Equipment – was a company manufacturing support vehicles for airports, aircraft, and docks. Established in 1947, its headquarters was in Cheltenham. It was formerly known as FL Douglas. It was later purchased by Textron and survives as a brand.
- Dr. Martens plc – is a footwear and clothing manufacturer headquartered in Wollaston, Northamptonshire. It was first known as R. Griggs Group who, in 1960, had bought the UK patents rights for the boots. In 2013 R. Griggs was bought by Permira. In 2022 Dr. Martens plc had total revenue of £908 million, with a net income of £181 million.
- Dragon International Film Studios – is a film and TV studios. Established in 2006, it is located in Bridgend, Wales. It was acquired by Shadow Holdings in 2019.
- Dragonfly Film and Television Productions (trading as Dragonfly) – is a television and film production company specialising in factual programmes. Its productions include: The Hotel, Tony Robinson's Crime and Punishment, One Born Every Minute, Ambulance and Eva Longoria: Searching for France. Based in London and Manchester; it was founded in 2004 by Nick Curwin and Magnus Temple as Firefly Film and Television Productions until December 2008 when it adopted its current name. It was acquired by Shine Group in 2006 until 2015 when it became part of Endemol Shine Group which was acquired by Banijay UK Productions in 2020 with Dragonfly continuing as a subsidiary.
- Drama Republic – is a television production company headquartered in London. It was founded in 2013 by producers Greg Brenman and Rosanna Benn. Since 2021 it is a subsidiary of Mediawan. Its productions include: Doctor Foster, Wanderlust, Life, One Day and Steal.
- Drax Group plc – is a power generation company that operates some power stations including the Drax Power Station. It also runs a biomass production and distribution business named Drax Biomass. It owns electricity supplier Haven Power, and electricity and gas supplier Opus Energy. It is headquartered in Drax, North Yorkshire. Its roots begin with the construction and running of the Drax Power Station by the state owned Central Electricity Generating Board (CEGB). When the CEGB was privatised in 1990 it was transferred to National Power which sold it to the AES Corporation in 1999. In 2003 it was acquired by a number of financial institutions and in 2005 it became part of the Drax Group. In 2022 its revenue was £8.1 billion, with a net income of £82 million.
- Dreams Ltd – is a company that manufactures and sells beds, mattresses, bedroom furniture, and bed linen. It operates a retail store chain, and retail website. It is headquartered in Loudwater, Buckinghamshire. It was founded in 1985 by Mike Clare. In 2013 it was put into administration and then acquired by Sun European Partners who sold it to Tempur Sealy in 2021.
- Drimnin Distillery Company – is a producer of Scotch whisky that owns the Nc'nean distillery located in Drimnin, Morvern, Scotland. The distillery was founded in 2017 by Annabel Thomas.
- Drum Films – was a film and TV production company. See Rogue Films.
- Drummonds Bank – is a financial services company offering private banking and wealth management. Established in 1717, its headquarters is in London. It is a branch of the Royal Bank of Scotland.
- DS Smith plc – is a multinational manufacturer of fibre-based packaging with recycling, and paper manufacturing. It is headquartered in London. It was founded in 1940 by cousins David Gabriel Smith and David Solomon Smith. In 2022 its revenue was £7.2 billion, with net income of £315 million.
- Dudley Building Society – is a building society offering mortgages, savings, investments, loans, and insurance. Headquartered in Dudley, West Midlands; it was founded in 1858.
- Dumfries, Lochmaben and Lockerbie Junction Railway – was a railway company established in 1860 that operated from 1863 to 1865.
- Dunblane, Doune and Callander Railway – was a railway company established in 1856 that operated from 1858 to 1865.
- Dundee and Arbroath Railway – was a railway company established in 1836 that operated from 1838 to 1862.
- Dundee and Newtyle Railway – was a railway company established in 1826 that operated from 1831 to 1863.
- Dundee and Perth Railway (renamed the Dundee and Perth and Aberdeen Railway Junction Company) – was a railway company established in 1845 that operated from 1847 to 1863.
- Dunelm Group plc – is a home furnishings retailer that operates a chain of stores, and a webstore. It also manufactures curtains, blinds, and accessories. It is headquartered in Syston, Leicestershire. It was founded in 1979 by Bill Adderley and Jean Adderley as a market stall before the first store opened in 1984. Its acquisitions include: Bellbird, Dorma bed linen brand, and World Stores including Kiddicare. In 2022 its revenue was £1.5 billion, with a net income of £171 million.

== E ==
- Eagle-Lion Films – was a film production and distribution company that operated from 1945 to 1950.
- Ealing Studios – is a film and television production company with a number of studios for hire. It is based in Ealing, London.
- Earl Shilton Building Society (trading as esbs) – is a building society offering mortgages, savings, and insurance. Headquartered in Earl Shilton, Leicestershire; it was founded in 1857.
- Early Learning Centre – is a company that operates a multinational retail store chain and retail website offering toys for younger children, and baby equipment such as prams and cots. It also produces toys for its own brand. It is headquartered in Amersham, Buckinghamshire. It was founded in 1974 by David John Beale. It was acquired by John Menzies in 1985. In 2001 it was the subject of a management buyout. It was acquired by Eagle Retail Investments in 2004, then by Mothercare in 2007. In 2019 it was acquired by The Entertainer through its parent company Teal Group Holdings.
- East Fife Central Railway – was a railway company established in 1893 that was amalgamated in 1895.
- East London Waterworks Company – was a utility company supplying water that operated from 1806 to 1904. Headquartered in London, it became part of the Metropolitan Water Board.
- East of Fife Railway – was a railway company established in 1855 which operated from 1857 to 1861 when it was amalgamated with Leven Railway to form the Leven and East of Fife Railway.
- East Surrey Water Company – was a utility company supplying water that operated from 1885 to 1996. It was formed by the merger of Caterham Springwater Company with Kenley Water Company. In 1996 it was merged with Sutton District Water to become Sutton and East Surrey Water.
- Eastern Counties Railway – was a railway company established in 1836 that operated from 1839 to 1862.
- Eastern Electricity – was an energy company distributing and supplying electricity. It operated from 1948 to 1995. Headquartered in Wherstead Park, Suffolk, it was also known as Eastern Group. In 1995 it was acquired by Hanson plc.
- Eastern Union Railway – was a railway company established in 1844 that operated from 1846 to 1856.
- EasyGroup Holdings – is a multinational brand licensing company. Established in 1998, its headquarters is in Kensington, London.
- EasyJet plc – is an airline group company comprising EasyJet UK, EasyJet Switzerland and EasyJet Europe. Established in 1995, its headquarters is at London Luton Airport, Luton, Bedfordshire. Its 2022 revenue was £5.7 billion, with a net income loss of £169 million.
- EasyJet UK – is an airline company headquartered at London Luton Airport, Luton, Bedfordshire. Founded in 2017; its parent company is Easy Jet plc.
- EasyMoney – is the trading name of financial services company E-Money Capital Ltd.
- Ecology Building Society – is a building society offering mortgages, and savings. It is focused on environmental sustainability. Headquartered in Silsden, West Yorkshire; it was founded in 1981.
- Ecora Royalties plc – is a mining finance company. Established in 1967, its headquarters is in London. It was formerly known as Diversified Bank Shares Limited, and until 2022 Anglo Pacific Group.
- Ecosse Films - is a film and television production company headquartered in London. It was founded in 1988 by Douglas Rae.
- Edgware, Highgate and London Railway – was a railway company established in 1862. It was taken over by the Great Northern Railway and opened in 1867 from Finsbury Park to Highgate and Edgware.
- Edinburgh and Glasgow Railway – was a railway company established in 1838 that operated from 1842 to 1865.
- Edinburgh and Northern Railway (renamed the Edinburgh, Perth and Dundee Railway) – was a railway company established in 1845 that operated from 1845 to 1862.
- Edinburgh Investment Trust plc – is an investment trust focused on investments in larger companies. It is headquartered in Edinburgh, Scotland. It was founded in 1899.
- Edinburgh, Leith and Newhaven Railway (also known as Edinburgh, Leith and Granton Railway) – was a railway company established in 1836 that operated from 1842 to 1847.
- Edinburgh, Loanhead and Roslin Railway – was a railway company established in 1870 that operated from 1873 to 1877.
- Edinburgh Suburban and Southside Junction Railway – was a railway company established in 1880 that operated from 1884 to 1885.
- Edinburgh Worldwide Investment Trust – is an investment trust company focused on global stock market listed companies. Headquartered in Edinburgh; it was founded in 1998 following the reconstruction of Dunedin Worldwide Investment Trust. It is managed by Baillie Gifford.
- The Edrington Group Ltd – is an international spirits company headquartered in Glasgow, Scotland. It produces Scotch whisky, American whisky, gin, and rum. It was founded in 1961 by the Robertson sisters (Elspeth, Agnes, and Ethel) who had inherited the Scotch whisky interests developed by their grandfather and father. Its brands include Highland Park, Glenrothes, Macallan, The Famous Grouse, Brugal rum, and others.
- E. H. Booth & Co Ltd (trading as Booths) – is a company that operates a supermarket chain in Northern England offering food, beverages, and household products including its own-brand products. It also has in-store restaurants. It is headquartered in Ribbleton, Lancashire. It was founded in 1847 by Edwin Henry Booth, and incorporated in 1896. In 1920 shares were offered to the employees, and in 2023 the company remains owned by the Booth family and employees.
- Electricity North West – is an electricity distribution network operator. Founded in 2007, its headquarters is in Warrington. It was formerly known as NORWEB. Its parent company is North West Electricity Networks.
- Elementis – is a speciality chemicals and personal care company headquartered in London. It was founded in 1844 as Harrisons & Crosfield which operated as a tea merchant. In the post-colonial era it divested its tea business and moved into chemicals, timber and builders merchants, and animal foodstuffs. From 1994 the non-chemicals businesses were divested and it was renamed Elementis. As well as speciality chemicals it expanded into personal care products.
- Eleven Film – is a television production company headquartered in London. It was founded in 2006 by Jamie Campbell and Joel Wilson. Since 2020 it is a subsidiary of Sony Pictures Television. Its productions include: Glue, Cast Offs, Sex Education, Red Rose, Ten Pound Poms and Lord of the Flies.
- Elstree Film Studios Ltd – operates Elstree Studios which is a film and TV production centre that was established in 1925. It is located at Borehamwood, Hertfordshire. The company was founded in 2000 as Elstree Film and Television Studios Limited and is owned by Hertsmere Borough Council. It has a partnership with BBC Studioworks.
- Ely and Newmarket Railway – was a railway company established in 1875 that operated from 1879 to 1898.
- Ember – is an electric coach operator based in Edinburgh. It was established in 2019.
- EMI Films – was a film production and distribution company. It operated from 1969 to 1986. It also operated under the names: EMI-Elstree, MGM-EMI, EMI Film Distributors Ltd, Anglo-EMI Film Distributors Ltd, Thorn EMI Screen Entertainment, and Thorn EMI.
- E-Money Capital Ltd (trading as EasyMoney) – is a banking and financial services company offering investments, savings, and loans based on peer-to-peer lending in the property sector. Headquartered in London; it was founded in 2001 by Sir Stelios Haji-Ioannou as a credit card company.
- Empire Cinemas Limited – is a cinema chain company, established in 2005.
- Endeavour Mining - is a multinational mining company headquartered in London. It was founded in 1988 as Endeavour Financial, a mining finance company. In the early 21st century it diversified into mining operations. In 2022 its total revenue was $2.5 billion, with a net income of $21.9 million.
- Energean plc – is an international oil and gas exploration and production company focused on natural gas. It is headquartered in London. It was founded in 2007 as Agean Energy SA, a Greek owned business. In 2010 it was renamed Energean Oil and Gas, and in 2020 renamed Energean plc. It owns the Karish gas field and the Tanin gas field. In 2022 its revenue was $732 million, with a net income of $17 million.
- Energie Group – is a company that operates two health club franchises: énergie Fitness Clubs, and énergie Fitness for Women. Headquartered in Milton Keynes, Buckinghamshire; it was founded in 2003 by Jan Spaticchia. Its parent company is Empowered Brands.
- English China Clays – was a company involved in mining china clay, stone quarries, building, and housing development. It operated from 1919 to 1999. Headquartered in St Austell, Cornwall, it was acquired by Imetal.
- Enlightenment Productions – is a film production and distribution company, headquartered in London. It was founded in 2001 by film producer Hanan Kattan and writer and director Shamim Sarif.
- Entain plc – is a multinational sports betting and gambling company headquartered in Douglas, Isle of Man. It was founded in 2004 in Luxembourg as Gaming VC Holdings. In 2010 it was renamed GVC Holdings, and in 2019 renamed as Entain plc. Its brands include bwin, Coral, Ladbrokes, partypoker, and Sportingbet. In 2022 its revenue was £4.2 billion, with a net income of £19.5 million.
- Eon Productions – is a film production company headquartered in London. It was founded in 1961 by film producers Albert R. Broccoli and Harry Saltzman in 1961.
- Equiniti Group – is a financial services company that provides stock transfer and pension administration services. Headquartered in Crawley, West Sussex; it was founded in 2007 as Lloyds TSB Registrars - a subsidiary of Lloyds Bank. In October 2007 it was acquired by Advent International. In 2015 it had an initial public offering on the London Stock Exchange. In 2020 it was rebranded as EQ. In 2021 it was acquired by Siris Capital who merged it with America Stock Transfer & Trust Company. In 2026 it was acquired by Bullish.
- Ernst & Young – is a multinational professional services partnership that mainly provides accounting services such as assurance (which includes financial audit), tax, consulting and advisory services. It is headquartered in London. Established in 1989, it was formed from the merger of Ernst & Whinney and Arthur Young & Co.
- Eros Films – was a film production and distribution company that operated from 1947 to 1961. Headquartered in London; it was founded by brothers Philip, Sydney, and Michael Hyams.
- esbs – is the trading name of Earl Shilton Building Society.
- Esk Valley Railway – was a railway company established in 1863 that operated from 1867 to 1871.
- Essex and Suffolk Water – is a utility company supplying water. Established in 1994, it was formed from the merger of Essex Water Company and Suffolk Water Company. It is headquartered in Durham. Since 2000 it is part of Northumbrian Water.
- European Opportunities Trust plc – is an investment trust focused on investments in European companies. It was founded in 2000 and is managed by Devon Equity Management Ltd. It was formerly known as Jupiter European Opportunities Trust.
- Euston Films – was a television and film production company headquartered in London. It was founded in 1971 as a subsidiary of Thames Television by Lloyd Shirley, George Taylor and Brian Tesler to produce television series and films for Thames on the ITV Network using 16mm film rather than videotape. Its productions include: The Sweeney, Van der Valk, Minder, Reilly, Ace of Spies, Widows and Paradise Postponed. From 1986 it increased its production of feature films in a joint-venture with Film 4 International. With the end of Thames as an ITV franchise holder in 1992, Euston's commissions reduced and it became defunct in 1994. Fremantle Media relaunched Euston Films as a television production company in 2014 after it had relaunched the Thames Television brand in 2012. In 2024 Fremantle laid off all staff at Euston Films and it ceased all production work.
- Everyman Media Group plc – is a cinema chain company operating Everyman Cinemas. It is headquartered in London. It was founded in 2000 by Daniel Broch.
- Everyone Active – is the trading name of leisure centre company Sports and Leisure Management Ltd.
- Extra Energy – was a utility company supplying gas and electricity that operated from 2014 to 2018. Its headquarters was in Birmingham.
- Eyemouth Railway – was a railway company established in 1884 that operated from 1891 to 1900.

== F ==
- F & C Investment Trust plc – trading as Foreign & Colonial Investment Trust, is an investment trust headquartered in London. It was founded in 1868 by Philip Rose. In 1981 it created Graphite Capital, a private equity company. In 2022 its revenue was £96.2 million, with a net income of £72 million.
- FatFace Ltd – is a company that operates a retail store chain and retail website offering clothing and accessories. It also produces a number of brands. It was founded in 1988 by Tim Stade and Jules Leaver. In 2007 it was acquired by Bridgepoint Capital. In 2020 ownership passed to its lenders and then in 2023 it was acquired by Next plc.
- Farboud Limited – is the former name of automobile manufacturer Arash Motor Company.
- Farmcare Trading Ltd – is a farming and wholesale company. Established in 1896, it was formerly part of the Co-operative Wholesale Society, and then The Co-operative Group. It was also known as The Co-operative Farms. In 2014 it was sold to the Wellcome Trust.
- FDM Group – is an international recruitment company headquartered in London. It trains mainly graduates, returners to work, and ex-military personnel in its academies before sending them as consultants to its clients who are mainly banks and other financial institutions. It was founded in 1990 by Rod and Jacqueline Flavell as Flavell Divett. It focused on IT recruitment until it acquired Mountford Software in 1995. In 1998 it was renamed FDM Group. In 2022 its revenue was £330 million, with a net income of £34 million.
- Federal Retail Trading Services – is the central buying group for co-operative retail societies in the United Kingdom. Established in 2015, its headquarters is One Angel Square, Manchester. It is managed by The Co-operative Group. It was preceded by the Co-operative Retail Trading Group from 1993 to 2015.
- Ferguson plc – was a building materials company that is a distributor of plumbing and heating products. It was previously also a manufacturer of plumbing and heating products, and originally was a manufacturer of sheep shearing equipment. It was founded in 1887. It was formerly known as Wolseley plc. In 2021 it sold its UK operations and moved its main listing to the US. In 2024 it was merged into Ferguson Enterprises.
- Festiniog and Blaenau Railway – was a railway company operating from 1868 to 1883.
- Ffestiniog Railway – was a railway company established in 1832 that operated from 1836 to 1946. It reopened in 1955.
- Fiction Factory – is a television production company based in Cardiff, Wales. It was founded in 2001 by Ed Thomas who became creative director. It is a subsidiary of Tinopolis. Its productions include: Satellite City, Caerdydd, Y Pris, Hinterland and Gwaith/Cartref.
- Fidelity China Special Situations plc – is an investment trust focused on long-term investments in Asia. Founded in 2010; it is managed by Fidelity International.
- Fidelity Emerging Markets – is an estate closed-end investment fund company. Headquartered in London; it was founded in 1989. In 2021 Fidelity International was appointed its manager and it was renamed from Genesis Emerging Markets to Fidelity Emerging Markets.
- Fidelity European Trust plc – is an investment trust focused on long-term investments in continental Europe. Founded in 1991, it was formerly named Fidelity European Values. It is managed by Fidelity International.
- Fidelity Special Values – is an investment trust focused on UK listed companies. Founded in 1994; it is managed by Fidelity International.
- Fifth Column Films – is a film production company, established in 2006.
- Film and Music Entertainment – is a film production company. It was founded in 2000 by Mike Downey and Sam Taylor in London.
- Film Producers Guild – was a collective of documentary film companies in England. Established in 1944, its headquarters was in London.
- Film Tank – is a film production company. Established in 2009, its headquarters is in Burnham-on-Sea, Somerset.
- Film4 Productions – is a film production and distribution company headquartered in London. It was founded in 1982 and is owned by Channel Four Television Corporation. Its previous names were: Channel Four Films, FilmFour International, and FilmFour.
- FilmFair – was an American/British animation studio and production company specialising in children's animated television series. As well as classically animated productions, many series were made by stop-motion using puppets, clay animation and cutout animation. Its UK series include: The Wombles, Paddington, The Herbs, Simon in the Land of Chalk Drawings, The Perishers and The Shoe People. It was founded in 1959 by animator Gus Jekel in Los Angeles, US. An office was opened in Paris then moved to London where FilmFair London became a division in 1968. Central Independent Television acquired a controlling stake in FilmFair London in the early 1980s until 1991 when they sold it to Storm Group (also known as Caspian Group). In 1996 it was sold to the Canadian company CINAR Films until 2012 when it became part of DHX Media. The American business was bought by Altschul Group Corporation in 1992 which sold its film catalogue to Discovery Education in 2003 which became part of Warner Bros. Discovery.
- Findhorn Railway – was a railway company established in 1859 that operated from 1860 to 1869.
- Fine Arts Films – was a film and TV production company specialising in animation. It was founded in 1955 by John David Wilson and operated until 1996.
- Fingercuff Productions – was a film production company specialising in short films and corporate promotional films. It was founded in 2000 by James Webber and Jamie Hooper. It is now defunct.
- Finsbury – was a public relations company. Established in 1994, its headquarters was in London. In January 2021, Finsbury, The Glover Park Group (GPG), and Hering Schuppener completed a merger to become Finsbury Glover Hering. In December 2021, Finsbury Glover Hering and Sard Verbinnen & Co. merged and rebranded as FGS Global,
- Finsbury Growth & Income Trust plc – is an investment trust focused on UK listed companies. It is headquartered in London. It was founded in 1926 and is managed by Lindsell Train Ltd.
- Fireworks Entertainment (previously named SkyVision) was a Canadian-British-US film and television production and distribution company. From 1991 to 2005 it was headquartered in Canada, and from 2005 to 2011 in the UK. Its television productions include: Andromeda, F/X: The Series, La Femme Nikita, Mutant X and Young Dracula. Its films include: Hardball, Raising Victor Vargas, Rat Race and The Believer. It was founded in 1991 by Brian K. Ross as SkyVision Entertainment - a division of John Labatt Entertainment Group, part of Labatt Brewing Company. It was renamed SkyVision Partners from 1994 to 1996. Following Labatt's acquisition by Interbrew, SkyVision was sold to Jay Firestone in 1996 and renamed Fireworks Entertainment. In 1998 Fireworks was acquired by Canwest Global who, in 2000, bought Endemol Entertainment's distribution arm and film library and the assets of Western International Communications and folded them into Fireworks. Also in 2000, Canwest Films was merged with Seven Arts International (another division of Canwest) to form Fireworks Pictures. In 2005 the Fireworks division was sold to Content Film - a British production company. In 2011, Fireworks International was renamed as Content Television and its parent company Content Film renamed Content Media Corporation which was later acquired by Canadian-based Kew Media Group in 2017. After Kew Media's collapse in 2020 its library was later acquired by Quiver Distribution and then bought by West Side Pictures in 2023 with distribution by Abacus Media Rights and Magnolia Pictures.
- Firmus Energy – is an energy company supplying gas and electricity. Established circa 2005, its headquarters is in Antrim, Northern Ireland. It was formerly a subsidiary of Bord Gáis. In 2019 it was acquired by Equitix.
- First Capital Connect – was a train operating company owned by FirstGroup that operated the Thameslink and Great Northern sectors from April 2006 to September 2014. It was succeeded by Govia Thameslink Railway with the franchise becoming part of the larger Thameslink, Southern and Great Northern franchise.
- First Choice Holidays Limited – is a travel company operating a travel agency, a tour operator, airlines, hotels, and cruise ships. Established in 1973, its headquarters is in Luton, Bedfordshire. It was formerly known as Owners Abroad. Its parent company is TUI AG.
- First Great Eastern – was a train operating company owned by FirstGroup that worked the Great Eastern franchise in the East of England from January 1997 to March 2004. Its services ran on the Great Eastern Main Line from Liverpool Street station and branch lines as well as the Romford to Upminster Line and the Gainsborough line from Marks Tey to Sudbury. In 2004 the Great Eastern franchise was merged into a larger Greater Anglia franchise that was awarded to One (later renamed National Express East Anglia).
- First Great Western Link (FGWL) – was a train operating company owned by FirstGroup that worked the Thames franchise from April 2004 to March 2006. Its main services were from London Paddington through Greater London and South East England as well as some services in the East Midlands, South West England and the West Midlands. In April 2003 First Group won a two-year contract to run the Thames franchise as FGWL taking over from Thames Trains in April 2004. In 2005 Heathrow Connect was founded as a joint-venture between FGWL and BAA. The Strategic Rail Authority carried out a franchise reorganisation whereby the Great Western, Thames and Wessex franchises would be combined into a Greater Western Franchise. This new franchise was won by FirstGroup with the FGWL services transferred to First Great Western on 1 April 2006.
- FirstGroup – is a transport group based in Aberdeen. It operates buses, coaches, passenger trains and trams in the UK and Ireland. It was established in 1995.
- First ScotRail – was the national passenger train operating company of Scotland between 2004 and 2015. It was owned by FirstGroup.
- Fisons – was a multinational pharmaceuticals, scientific instruments, and horticultural chemicals company. It operated from 1843 to 1995. Headquartered in Ipswich, Suffolk, it was formerly known as Edward Packard and Company Ltd, and Packard and James Fison (Thetford) Limited. It was acquired by Rhône-Poulenc in 1995.
- Fitness First Ltd – is a company that operates a multinational health club chain. Headquartered in Manchester; it was founded in 1993 by Mike Balfour.
- Fletcher, Burrows and Company – was a coal mining, and cotton mills company, It operated from 1872 to 1929. It became part of Manchester Collieries.
- Flow Energy – was an energy company supplying gas and electricity, and boilers. Established in 1998, its headquarters was in Ipswich. It was originally part of Flowgroup plc. In 2018 it was acquired by Co-op Energy and became defunct in 2020.
- Focus Films – is a film production company headquartered in London. It was founded in 1982 by David Pupkewitz and Marsha Levin.
- FoolishPeople – is a theatre company, film production, and book publishing company. It was founded in 1989 by John Harrigan.
- Force Protection Europe – was a military vehicle manufacturing company. It was the European subsidiary of Force Protection Inc. Established in 2008, its headquarters was in Leamington Spa, Warwickshire. In 2011 it was acquired by General Dynamic.
- Forest of Dean Railway – was a railway company operating from 1826 to 1849.
- Foresight Group Holdings – is an investment company focused on investments in clean energy generation and associated infrastructure companies. Headquartered in London; it was founded in 1984. It had an initial public offering on the London Stock Exchange in 2021.
- Foresight Environmental Infrastructure – is an investment trust company focused on renewable energy infrastructure. Headquartered in London; it was founded in 2014. It was previously known as John Laing Environmental Fund, and JLEN Environmental Assets Group. In 2019 Foresight Group Holdings took over its management from John Laing Capital Management. In 2024 it was renamed Foresight Environmental Infrastructure.
- Foresight Solar Fund – is an investment trust focused on solar energy companies. Headquartered in St Helier, Jersey; it was founded in 2013. It is managed by Foresight Group Holdings.
- Formartine and Buchan Railway – was a railway company established in 1858 that operated from 1861 to 1866 when it was absorbed by the Great North of Scotland Railway.
- Forth and Clyde Junction Railway – was a railway company established in 1853 that operated from 1856 to 1923.
- Fortnum & Mason plc – is a company that operates a luxury department store on Piccadilly, London, four other stores, and a retail website. It is known for offering high quality food products such as food hampers. Headquartered in London; it was founded in 1707 by William Fortnum and Hugh Mason. It is owned by Wittington Investments Ltd.
- Foster Yeoman – was a construction materials company involved in quarrying and supplying stone and asphalt materials. It also operated a rail haulage line. Headquartered in Marston Bigot, Somerset, it operated from 1923 to 2006 when it was merged into Aggregate Industries.
- Framestore – is a film visual effects company. Established in 1986, its headquarters is in London. It was merged with Computer Film Company.
- Frank PR – is a public relations company. Established in 2000, its headquarters is in London.
- Frasers Group plc – is a retail, sport, and intellectual property company headquartered in Shirebrook, Derbyshire. It owns the department store chain House of Fraser, Sports Direct, Jack Wills, Game, Flannels, USC, Lillywhites, Evans Cycles and others. Its intellectual property includes the brands Everlast, Lonsdale, Slazenger, and No Fear. It was established in 1982 by Mike Ashley as Mike Ashley Sports. Later it was renamed Sports Direct International plc and in 2019 renamed Frasers Group plc. In 2022 its revenue was £4.6 billion, with a net income of £256 million.
- Free Seed Films – is a film production company, established in 2012.
- Freestream – is the former name of Caparo Vehicle Technologies, an automotive and aerospace engineering company.
- French Connection – is a manufacturer, retailer, and wholesaler of women's and men's clothing, accessories, perfumes, watches, eyeglasses, and homeware. It operates an international retail store chain for the French Connection brand, and 12 stores for the Toast brand. Its other brands are YMC, Great Plains, and formerly Nicole Farhi. It also has concessions in UK department stores, and supplies its products to other multi-brand retailers. Headquartered in London; it was founded in 1972 by Stephen Marks. In 1984 it was floated on the London Stock Exchange. In 2021 it was acquired by MIP Holdings Ltd.
- Freshwater, Yarmouth and Newport Railway – was a railway company established in 1880 that operated from 1888 to 1923 when the line was absorbed by the Southern Railway.
- Freud Communications – is a public relations company. Established in 1985, its headquarters is in London.
- Fuel Juice Bars Ltd – is a company that operates a chain of juice bars offering fruit juices and smoothies. It is headquartered in Glasgow, Scotland, and was incorporated in 2004. It was previously named Skykirk Ltd.
- Fulhold Pharma – is a pharmaceuticals company. Established in 2014, its headquarters is in Macclesfield, Cheshire. It was formerly known as Fulhold Ltd.
- Fulton's Foods – was a company that operated a frozen food retail chain. It was headquartered in Darton, South Yorkshire. It was founded in 1960 by Jack Fulton as a poultry business. It diversified into frozen food in 1974 as Frozen Value Ltd. In 1997 it was the subject of a management buyout. In 2013 it was rebranded as Fulton's Foods. In 2020 it was acquired by Poundland who later closed all of the remaining stores.
- Fulwell 73 – is a television, film, music and commercials production company headquartered in London. It was founded in 2005 by brothers Gabe and Ben Turner, Leo Pearlman and Ben Winston with James Corden joining as the fifth partner in 2017. It was merged with SpringHill Company in 2025. Fulwell 73's television series include: The Late Late Show with James Corden, Drop the Mic, Sunderland 'Til I Die, and The Kardashians. Its films include One Direction: This is Us, The Class of '92 and The Guvnors. Its parent company is Fulwell Entertainment.
- Funding Circle – is a financial technology company that provides loans and financial services to small and medium-sized businesses. Headquartered in London; it was founded in 2010 as a peer-to-peer lending platform. It moved to solely institutional lending in 2022.
- Funeral Services Ltd (trading as Co-op Funeralcare) – is a funeral services company providing funerals, burials, cremations, memorial masonry, and coffin production. Headquartered in Manchester, its parent company is The Co-operative Group.
- Furness Building Society – is a building society offering mortgages, savings, investments, loans, credit cards, and insurance. Headquartered in Barrow-in-Furness, Cumbria; it was founded in 1865. Its subsidiaries include: Furness Mortgage Services, and Furness Independent Financial Advisers.
- Furness Railway – was a railway company established in 1844 that operated from 1846 to 1922.
- Furniture Village – is a company that operates a furniture retail store chain and retail website. It is headquartered in Slough, Berkshire. It was founded in 1989 by Peter Harrison and David Imrie with Cadogan Estates. In 2001 Cadogan Estates sold its stake to the company management.
- Fuse Universal – is an online education company. Established in 2008, its headquarters is in London.
- Fusion IP – was an intellectual property company that commercialised intellectual property for the University of Sheffield, Cardiff University, University of Nottingham, and Swansea University. Headquartered in Sheffield, South Yorkshire; it was founded in 2001. In 2014 it was acquired by IP Group.
- Future plc – is an international media company that has over 200 brands in magazine and internet publications, video production through Future Studios, and sales, marketing, and distribution through Marketforce. It is headquartered in Bath, Somerset. It was founded in 1985 by Chris Anderson as Future Publishing. Its brands include: TechRadar, PC Gamer, Tom's Guide, Tom's Hardware, Marie Claire, GamesRadar+, CinemaBlend, Android Central, IT Pro, Windows Central, How it Works, and many others. In 2022 its revenue was £825 million, with a net income of £122 million.

== G ==
- Gainsborough Pictures – was a film production company, 1924–1951. Established in London, it was also known as Gainsborough Studios.
- Gala Bingo – is a bingo company, established in 1991. It is owned by Entain.
- Gallagher Group – is a house building, civil engineering, quarrying, and property company. It is headquartered in Aylesford, Kent. It was founded in 1973 by Pat Gallagher as a civil engineering and groundworks contractor. Its services include: building, civil engineering, plant and transport, building materials, landfill and restoration, property development, and farming and estate management.
- Galliard Group Ltd – is a property development company that operates residential, hotel, and commercial projects. It is headquartered in Loughton, Essex. It was founded in 1992 by Stephen Conway. It has 3 divisions: Galliard Homes, Galliard Commercial, and Galliard Construction.
- Galliford Try – is a construction company headquartered in Uxbridge. It was founded in 2000 by the merger of the two construction companies Try Group and Galliford. Its main business was house building and other construction. Later it secured government private finance initiative contracts for construction of schools and other public works. In 2020 it sold its house building business to Bovis Homes. It later returned to the affordable homes sector as well as its other activities.
- Galpharm International – is a pharmaceuticals company producing non-prescription medicine. Established in 1982, its headquarters is in Dodworth, Barnsley. In 2008 it was acquired by Perrigo Group.
- Galvani Bioelectronics – is a bioelectronics research and development company. Established in 2016 by GlaxoSmithKline and Verily Life Sciences, its headquarters is in Stevenage, Hertfordshire.
- Games Workshop plc – is a manufacturer of miniature wargames headquartered in Lenton, Nottingham. Its best known products are Warhammer Age of Sigmar, Warhammer 40,000, as well as The Lord of the Rings/The Hobbit tabletop battle games. It also operates a chain of Games Workshop retail stores. It was founded in 1975 by John Peake, Ian Livingstone, and Steve Jackson as a manufacturer of wooden boards for games. It later became an importer of Dungeons & Dragons, and then published its own wargames and role-playing games. In 2022 its revenue was £386 million, with a net income of £128 million.
- Gamesys – is a software development and gaming company. Established in 2001, its headquarters is in London. In 2021 it was acquired by Bally's Corporation.
- Gamma Communications – is a telecommunications company specialising in unified communications as a service. Headquartered in Newbury; it was founded in 2001.
- Garnkirk and Glasgow Railway – was a railway company established in 1826 that operated from 1831 to 1865. After extending its line it was renamed the Glasgow, Garnkirk and Coatbridge Railway. From 1846 to 1865 the line was absorbed into the Caledonian Railway although the company wasn't dissolved until 1880.
- Gas Light and Coke Company – was an energy company that produced and supplied coal gas and coke. It operated from 1812 to 1949. Headquartered in Westminster, London, it was also known as the Westminster Gas Light and Coke Company, and as Chartered Gas Light and Coke Company. In 1949 it was nationalised to become part of the North Thames Gas Board.
- Gate Studios – was a film studios company that operated from 1924 to circa 1954. It was situated in Borehamwood. It was previously named Whitehall Studios, Consolidated Studios, J.H. Studios, and M.P. Studios.
- Gateway Films – is a film production company headquartered in London. It was founded in 2009 by Terry Stone, Terry Byrne and Chris Howard.
- Gaumont British Picture Corporation – was a film company producing and distributing films, operating a cinema chain, and manufacturing film projection equipment. Established in 1898, its headquarters was in London. In 1941 it was acquired by The Rank Organisation.
- Gaymer Cider Company – was a producer of cider and other alcoholic drinks. It was established in the 18th century by Robert Gaymer. In 1961 it was acquired by Showerings which merged with Allied Breweries in 1968. In 1992 it was de-merged in a management buyout. In 1994 it was acquired by Matthew Clark plc which was acquired by Constellation Brands in 1998. In 2010 it was acquired by C&C Group plc who subsumed it into the parent company.
- GB Group – is an identity verification, location intelligence and fraud prevention company. Headquartered in Chester; it was founded in 1989 as Phonelink Data. It was renamed to TelMe.com, then TelMe Group and from 2002 GB Group.
- GB Railways Group – was the parent company of a number of train operating companies including: Anglia Railways, Hull Trains, and GB Railfreight. It also had stakes in the Australian rail company Great Southern Rail, and the Estonian rail company Edelaraudtee. It was founded in 1996 and headquartered in London. In 1997 it was listed on the London Stock Exchange Alternative Investment Market. It was acquired by FirstGroup in August 2003. Anglian Railways lost its franchise in 2004, Hull Trains continued as a subsidiary of FirstGroup as First Hull Trains, while GB Railfreight was sold to Eurotunnel in 2010.
- G.B. Samuelson Productions – was a film production company that operated from 1914 to 1933. It was also known as British-Super Films, and Napoleon Films.
- GCM Resources – is a mining company with interests in open cast coal mining in Bangladesh. Established in 1998, its headquarters is in London. It was formerly known as Asia Energy plc, and as Global Coal Management.
- GCP Infrastructure Investments – is an investment trust company focused on infrastructure. Founded in 2010; its investment advisor is Gravis Capital Management.
- Gemfields – is a mining and jewellery company, established in 2007.
- General Post Office (GPO) – was the state postal system and telecommunications carrier of the UK until 1969. It was established in the 17th century and supervised by the Postmaster General, a government minister. In 1969 it was made a statutory corporation known as the Post Office. In 1981 the telecommunications business was made a separate corporation named British Telecom. In 1987 the Post Office was reorganised as the Post Office Limited.
- General Terminus and Glasgow Harbour Railway – was a railway company established in 1846 that operated from 1848 to 1865 when it was amalgamated into the Caledonian Railway.
- Genuit Group plc – is a manufacturer of plastic piping systems for the residential, commercial, civil, and infrastructure sectors. It is headquartered in Edlington, South Yorkshire. It was founded in 1980 by Kevin McDonald and Geoff Harrison as Polypipe. In 1999 it was acquired by IMI plc who sold it to Castle Harlan in 2005. In 2007 it was the subject of a management buyout. In 2014 it was floated on the London Stock Exchange, and in 2021 it was renamed Genuit Group. In 2022 its revenue was £622 million, with a net income of £36 million.
- Genus plc – is a producer of genetics and other biotechnology products for cattle and pigs. Established in 1933, its headquarters is in Basingstoke, Hampshire. It was formerly the Breeding and Production Division of the Milk Marketing Board. In 2022 its revenue was £593 million, with a net income of £36 million.
- George Lister Engineering – was an automobile manufacturing company. See Lister Motor Company.
- George Wimpey – was a multinational construction company involved in housebuilding, civil and commercial construction, and formerly road surfacing. Established in 1880, its headquarters was in London. In 2007 it was merged with Taylor Woodrow to form Taylor Wimpey.
- Gibbs and Canning – was a terracotta manufacturing company specialising in architectural terracotta. It operated from 1847 to the 1950s. Its headquarters was in Glascote, Tamworth, Staffordshire.
- Gifford and Garvald Railway – was a railway company established in 1891 that operated from 1901 to 1923 when it was absorbed into the London and North Eastern Railway.
- Ginetta Cars – is an automobile manufacturing company producing racing and sports cars. Established in 1958, its headquarters is in Garforth, Leeds.
- Girvan and Portpatrick Junction Railway – was a railway company established in 1865 that operated from 1877 to 1887 when it was taken over by the Ayrshire and Wigtownshire Railway.
- GK Films – is a British-American film and television production company. It is headquartered in Santa Monica, California, US. It was founded in 1990 by Graham King and was formerly known as Initial Entertainment Group.
- Glasgow and Renfrew District Railway – was a railway company established in 1897 that operated from 1903 to 1922 when it was absorbed into the London, Midland and Scottish Railway.
- Glasgow and South Western Railway – was a railway company established in 1850 by the merger of the Glasgow, Paisley, Kilmarnock and Ayr Railway with the Glasgow, Dumfries and Carlisle Railway. In 1923 it was absorbed into the London, Midland and Scottish Railway.
- Glasgow, Barrhead and Neilston Direct Railway – was a railway company established in 1845 that operated from 1848 to 1873. It was taken over by the Glasgow, Barrhead and Kilmarnock Joint Railway.
- Glasgow, Barrhead and Kilmarnock Joint Railway – was a railway company operating from 1869 to 1880 that took over the Glasgow, Barrhead and Neilston Direct Railway. It was jointly owned by the Caledonian Railway and the Glasgow and South Western Railway.
- Glasgow, Bothwell, Hamilton and Coatbridge Railway – was a railway company established in 1874 that operated from 1877 to 1878 when it was absorbed into the North British Railway.
- Glasgow, Dumbarton and Helensburgh Railway – was a railway company established in 1855 that operated from 1858 to 1862 when it was amalgamated with the Edinburgh and Glasgow Railway.
- Glasgow, Dumfries and Carlisle Railway – was a railway company established in 1846 that operated from 1848 to 1850 when it was merged with the Glasgow, Paisley, Kilmarnock and Ayr Railway to form the Glasgow and South Western Railway.
- Glasgow, Paisley and Greenock Railway – was a railway company established in 1837 that operated from 1841 to 1851 when it was absorbed into the Caledonian Railway.
- Glasgow, Paisley, Kilmarnock and Ayr Railway – was a railway company established in 1837 that operated from 1839 to 1850 when it was merged with the Glasgow, Dumfries and Carlisle Railway to form the Glasgow and South Western Railway.
- Glencore – is a Swiss / British multinational commodities trading, and mining company. Established in 1974, it was formerly known as Marc Rich + Co AG. Its headquarters is in Baar, Switzerland. In 2019 its revenue was $215 billion, with net income of $1.5 billion.
- Glenfiddich distillery – is a Scotch whisky producer based in Dufftown, Scotland. It was founded in 1886 by William Grant and is owned by William Grant & Sons.
- GlenWyvis distillery – is a producer of Scotch whisky and gin located in Dingwall, Scotland. It was founded in 2015 by John McKenzie.
- GlobalData – is a data analytics and consulting company headquartered in London. It was founded in 1999 as TheMutual.net. In 2006 it was renamed TMN Group and in 2009 was acquired through a reverse takeover by Progressive Digital Media Ltd and renamed Progressive Digital Media Group. In 2016 it acquired Global Data Holding and was renamed GlobalData. In 2022 it acquired Media Business Insight including publications Broadcast and Screen International
- Global Smaller Companies Trust – is an investment trust company focused on smaller companies worldwide. Headquartered in London; it was founded in 1889 as Alliance Investment. It has also been named: F&C Alliance Investment, F&C Smaller Companies, and BMO Global Smaller Companies.
- Globe-Trotter – is a manufacturer of luxury luggage. It is headquartered in Mayfair, London. It was founded in 1897 in Dresden, Germany, and was formerly named Stabilist. In 1987 production was moved to Waltham Forest, London.
- Glory Film Co. – is a film and television production company.
- Go-Ahead Group – is a multinational bus and train passenger transport group headquartered in Newcastle upon Tyne. It runs bus operations across the UK and in Singapore, Ireland, Sweden and Australia. In 2026 it operates only one UK rail franchise - the Elizabeth line as part of GTS Rail Operations. Its international rail services are Go-Ahead Nordic in Norway and Connecting Stockholm in Sweden.
  Go-Ahead logo
  It was founded in February 1987 as Go-Ahead Northern Ltd as part of the privatisation of the National Bus Company in which Martin Ballinger and Chris Moyes led a management buyout of its northern division - the Northern General Transport Company. Go-Ahead has acquired a large number of other bus companies such as Brighton & Hove, Oxford Bus Company, London Central, Metrobus, London General and many more. In 1994 it was renamed Go-Ahead Group and floated on the London Stock Exchange.1994) In 1996, it diversified into the railway sector and won the Thames Trains franchise (1996–2004), and went on via the Govia joint-venture with Keolis to operate Thameslink (1997–2006), Govia South Central (2001–2015), Southeastern (2006–2021), London Midland (2007–2017), and Govia Thameslink Railway (2014–2026) services. In August 2022, Go-Ahead was acquired by a consortium of the Australian Kinetic Group and the Spanish Globalvia.
- Goldcrest Films – is a film company involved in film production, distribution, marketing, and financing. It was founded in 1977 by Jake Eberts as Goldcrest Films International. Its headquarters is in London.
- Golden Wonder – is a manufacturer of crisps and other snacks. It was founded in 1947 by William Alexander in Stockbridge, Edinburgh. It is now headquartered in North Lincolnshire. Since 2006 it is owned by Tayto (Northern Ireland) Limited.
- Good Relations – is a public relations company, headquartered in London.
- Goodwin – is a heavy engineering company specialising in the supply and fabrication of castings. Its other products include: radar antennas, specialist polymers, jewellery, and fire suppression. Headquartered in Stoke-on-Trent; it was founded in 1883 as R. Goodwin & Sons. In 1958 it was listed on the London Stock Exchange.
- Govia – was a train operating company headquartered in Newcastle upon Tyne that was a joint-venture between Go-Ahead Group 65% and Keolis 35%. Founded in 1997; it operated the following subsidiary companies: Thameslink from March 1997 to March 2006, Southern operating as Southern from August 2001 to July 2015 and Gatwick Express operating from June 2008 to July 2015, Southeastern from April 2006 to October 2021, London Midland from November 2007 to December 2017, and Govia Thameslink Railway from September 2014 to May 2026. After the loss of its remaining franchise Govia became defunct in 2026.
- Govia Thameslink Railway – was a train operating company that worked the Thameslink, Southern and Great Northern franchise (TSGN) from September 2014 to 31 May 2026. It was owned by Govia which was a joint-venture of Go-Ahead Group and Keolis. It ran lines in South East England, Greater London and the East of England. In September 2014, it took over the franchise from First Capital Connect. In 2015, both Southern and Gatwick Express services were integrated into GTR to make it the largest rail franchise by passengers in the UK. Trains ran under the sub-brands: Thameslink, Great Northern, Southern, and Gatwick Express. GTR was succeeded by the state-owned Greater Thameslink Railway on 31 May 2026.
- GPO Film Unit – was a film production company that operated from 1933 to 1940. It was a subdivision of the General Post Office. It later became Crown Film Unit.
- Grainger plc – is a residential property development and management company headquartered in Newcastle upon Tyne. It was founded in 1912 by the Dickinson family as the Grainger Trust. In 2022 its revenue was £279 million, with a net income of £229 million.
- Grain Media – is a film, television, and commercials production company. It was founded in 2006 by Jon Drever and Orlando von Einsiedel. It is headquartered in London.
- Grand Junction Waterworks Company – was a utility company supplying water that operated from 1811 to 1903. Headquartered in London, it became part of the Metropolitan Water Board.
- Grand Metropolitan – was a leisure, manufacturing, and property conglomerate. It operated hotels, holiday centres, catering, restaurants, brewing, dairies, bingo, and gambling concerns. It operated from 1934 to 1997. Headquartered in London, it was formerly known as Mount Royal Metropolitan Association (MRMA), and Grand Metropolitan Hotels. In 1997 it was merged with Guinness Brewery to form Diageo plc.
- Grantura Engineering – was a sister company of sports car manufacturer TVR.
- Grantura Plastics – was a sister company of TVR.
- Gray-Nicolls – is a cricket equipment and clothing manufacturing company. Established in 1855 as H.J. Gray and Sons, it merged with L.J. Nicolls in the early 1940s. Headquartered in Robertsbridge, East Sussex; its parent company is Grays International.
- Grays International – is a sports equipment manufacturing company, providing equipment for cricket, field hockey, rugby union and tennis. Headquartered in Robertsbridge, East Sussex; its brands are Gray-Nicolls, Gilbert Netball, Gilbert Rugby, Grays Hockey, and Grays of Cambridge.
- Graze – is a snack food company headquartered in London. Founded in 2008, it was purchased by Unilever plc in 2019.
- Great British Energy – is a publicly owned energy investment company sponsored by the government Department for Energy Security and Net Zero. Headquartered in Aberdeen, Scotland; it was founded in 2025. It invests in and co-develops clean energy production and storage, community energy, and supply chains.
- Great British Energy – Nuclear – is a government owned nuclear energy and nuclear fuel company sponsored by the Department for Energy Security and Net Zero. It is headquartered in Warrington. It is co-ordinating the nuclear industry to help reach the government's net zero targets, including the development of small modular nuclear reactors. It was established in 2023 as Great British Nuclear; then renamed Great British Energy – Nuclear in 2024.
- Great British Railways – is a planned state-owned railway company that will operate most rail infrastructure and the majority of passenger rail services in Great Britain.
- Great Central Railway – was a railway company established in 1897 when the Manchester, Sheffield and Lincolnshire Railway was renamed. It operated from 1897 to 1922 when it was absorbed into the London and North Eastern Railway.
- Great Eastern Railway (GER) – was a railway company with a main route from London Liverpool Street to Norwich, and routes across East Anglia, Essex and parts of suburban London. It was founded in 1862 by the amalgamation of Eastern Counties Railway, Eastern Union Railway, and a number of smaller railway companies. It manufactured most of its locomotives and rolling stock at Stratford Works. It also ran steamboat services, ferries, and buses. It owned 5 hotels and founded Stratford Market. In 1923 it was amalgamated into the London and North Eastern Railway.
- Great Marlborough Productions – is an alternative name of animation studio Hanna-Barbera Studios Europe.
- Great North of Scotland Railway – was a railway company established in 1846 that operated from 1854 to 1923 when it was absorbed into the London and North Eastern Railway. It also built and ran several hotels.
- Great Northern Railway – was a railway company established in 1846 that operated from 1848 to 1923 when it was absorbed into the London and North Eastern Railway.
- Great Northern and Strand Railway – was a railway company established in 1896 to construct and underground railway in London. In 1902, the company merged with the Brompton and Piccadilly Circus Railway to form the Great Northern, Piccadilly and Brompton Railway and became a subsidiary of the Underground Electric Railways Company of London. The combined railway opened in 1906 between Finsbury Park and Hammersmith. It now forms part of the London Underground's Piccadilly line.
- Great Portland Estates – is a property development and investment company. Most of its assets are in London where it is headquartered. It was founded in 1959 by Howard and Basil Samuel to invest in properties first developed by the Dukes of Portland. It was floated on the London Stock Exchange the same year. In 2007 it was converted into a real estate investment trust. In 2021 it was rebranded as GPE. In 2022 its revenue was £84 million, with a net income of £167 million.
- Great Productions – is a film production company, headquartered at Pinewood Studios.
- Great Western Railway (GWR) – was a British railway company that was one of the Big Four. It connected London with the south west, west, and West Midlands of England, and most of Wales. It was headquartered at Paddington station, London. It was founded in 1833, was enabled by an Act of Parliament in 1835, and ran its first trains in 1838. The routes were engineered by Isambard Kingdom Brunel. In 1921 the Railways Act amalgamated it with the remaining independent railways in its area. Many of its locomotives, carriages, and wagons were built in the company's workshops in Swindon. It also operated ferry services to Ireland and the Channel Islands, operated road motor services, was a part of the Railway Air Services, and owned ships, canals, docks, and hotels. In 1947 it was nationalised and became the Western Region of British Railways.
- Great Western Railway (GWR 2006–2026) – is the trading name of First Great Western Ltd which is a train operating company owned by FirstGroup that works the Greater Western franchise. It provides services from London Paddington along the Great Western Main Line and other services in Greater London, South East England, South West England, South Wales, East Midlands and West Midlands. In April 2006 the Great Western, Great Western Link, and Wessex Trains franchises were combined into a new Greater Western franchise which was won by FirstGroup to operate as First Great Western Railway. It won subsequent contract extensions until December 2026. In 2015, it was renamed the Great Western Railway. In March 2025, GWR managed 198 stations on a 1,997 km (1241 miles) network providing 89 million annual passenger journeys, and employed 6,449 staff. It is scheduled to return to public ownership on 13 December 2026 and will become part of Great British Railways.
- Great Yarmouth Waterworks Company – was a utility company (water supply) from 1853 to 1962. In 1962 it merged with the Lowestoft Water Company to form the East Anglian Water Company.
- Greater Anglia (Transport UK East Anglia Ltd) – was a train operating company that worked the Greater Anglia franchise from 5 February 2012 to 15 October 2016 and the East Anglia franchise from 16 October 2016 to 12 October 2025. It provided services from Liverpool Street station to Essex, Suffolk, Norfolk and parts of Hertfordshire and Cambridgeshire as well as other regional services in the East of England. Headquartered in London; it was founded in 2012 by Abellio who won the Greater Anglia franchise from National Express. Initially trading as Greater Anglia it was rebranded in December 2013 to Abellio Greater Anglia. In May 2015 its suburban London services were transferred to London Overground and TfL Rail. The franchise was retendered as the East Anglia franchise and awarded to Abellio in 2016 with a rebrand to Great Anglia the same year. In 2017 Abellio sold a 40% stake in Greater Anglia to Mitsui & Co.. In February 2023, Transport UK Group completed a management buyout of Abellio's UK business including its share in Greater Anglia. In October 2025, Greater Anglia was nationalised under the same name as a subsidiary of DfT Operator. In May 2026, GBR Anglia was established to unite the management of Greater Anglia, neighbouring nationalised operator c2c and track operator Network Rail Anglia.
- Greater Thameslink Railway (Thameslink Southern Great Northern Ltd) – is a state-owned train operating company that took over the services of Govia Thameslink Railway on 31 May 2026. It is owned by DfT Operator for the Department for Transport. It runs trains in the East of England, Greater London and South East England under the sub-brands Gatwick Express, Great Northern, Southern and Thameslink.
- Greencoat UK Wind – is an investment trust company focused on UK wind farms. Headquartered in London; it was founded in 2012. It is managed by Greencoat Capital.
- Greenock and Ayrshire Railway – was a railway company established in 1865 that operated from 1869 to 1872 when it was amalgamated with the Glasgow and South Western Railway.
- Greenock and Wemyss Bay Railway – was a railway company established in 1862 that operated from 1865 to 1893 when it was amalgamated with the Caledonian Railway.
- Greenpark Productions – is a documentary film production company. Established in 1938 in Polperro, its headquarters is in London.
- Greggs plc – is a bakery shop chain headquartered in Quorum Business Park, North Tyneside. It was founded in 1939 by John Gregg. In 2022 its revenue was £1.5 billion, with a net income of £120 million.
- Greybull Capital – is a private investment company (purchasing and divesting distressed companies). Established in 2010, its headquarters is in Knightsbridge, London.
- Grinnall Specialist Cars – is an automobile and motorcycle manufacturing company, established in Bewdley, Worcestershire.
- Grosvenor Casinos – is a gambling company. Established in 1970, its headquarters is in Maidenhead. Its parent company is The Rank Group.
- Group Lotus - is a manufacturing company (production of sports and racing cars, and engineering development). See Lotus Cars.
- GSK plc – is a British multinational pharmaceutical company (pharmaceuticals, vaccines, oral healthcare, nutritional products, over the counter medicine). It was established in 2000 by a merger of Glaxo Wellcome and SmithKline Beecham. Headquartered in Brentford, London, it has one subsidiary. In 2022 its revenue was £29.3 billion, with a net income of £15.6 billion.
- GTM Cars – is a kit car manufacturing company. Established in 1967, its headquarters is in Kingswinford, Dudley.
- Gü – is a dessert manufacturing company that was founded by James Averdieck in 2003 in London. In 2010 Gü was sold to Noble Foods.
- Gus Robinson Developments Ltd – is a house building and construction company. It is headquartered in Hartlepool, County Durham. It was founded in 1976 by Gus Robinson. It specialises in social housing as well as general construction.
- GW Pharmaceuticals – is a biopharmaceutical medicines production company. Established in 1998, its headquarters is in Cambridge, Cambridgeshire.

== H ==
- Habitat – is a household furnishings retail company. Established in 1964, its headquarters is in Milton Keynes, Buckinghamshire. Its parent company is Sainsbury's.
- Hafren Dyfrdwy – is a utility company (water supply). Established in 1997, its headquarters is in Packsaddle, Rhostyllen, Wrexham, Wales. It was formed from the merger of Wrexham Water and Chester Waterworks Company, and was formerly known as Dee Valley Water. Its parent company is Severn Trent.
- Haleon – is a multinational consumer healthcare company headquartered in Weybridge, Surrey. It was established in 2022 as a corporate spin-off from GSK. It has a large number of brands including: Advil, Beecham, Biotene, Centrum, Eno, Nicorette, Niquitin, Panodol, Parodontax, Sensodyne, Solpadeine, Synthol, Tums, and others. In 2022 its revenue was £10.8 billion, with a net income of £1.1 billion.
- HAL Films – was a film production company from 1997 to 2012. Its headquarters was in London.
- Halfords – is a retail chain company offering motoring products, cycling products, and electric bikes and scooters. It also provides vehicle servicing, MOT, maintenance and repairs through its subsidiary Halfords Autocentre. It also owns bike manufacturer Boardman Bikes. It is headquartered in Redditch, Worcestershire. Frederick Rushbrooke founded it in 1892 as a wholesale ironmongery. In 1902 it began selling cycling products. It was acquired by Burmah Oil in 1965; Ward White Group in 1983; the Boots Group in 1989; and CVC Capital Partners in 2003. It was floated on the London Stock Exchange in 2004.
- Halifax – was a financial services company providing banking and insurance. It was formerly a building society, and estate agents. Established in 1853, its headquarters were in Halifax, West Yorkshire. It was formerly known as the Halifax Permanent Benefit Building and Investment Society, and HBOS. In 2007 it was subsumed by the Bank of Scotland which was in turn absorbed by Lloyds Banking Group in 2009. The Halifax brand name continued until 2026 when it was replaced by Lloyds.
- Halma – is a British multinational group of safety equipment companies that make products for hazard detection and life protection. It is headquartered in Amersham, Buckinghamshire. It was founded in 1894 in Ceylon as the Nahalma Tea Estate Company Ltd and became the Nahalma Rubber Estate Company Ltd. After its tea and rubber plantations were nationalised or divested it became an investment and industrial holding company as Halma Investments Ltd. Later it became a manufacturer of health and safety products, and environmental products. In 2022 its revenue was £1.5 billion, with a net income of £244 million.
- Hamleys – is a company that operates a multinational chain of toy stores, and a retail website. It has 11 stores in the UK including its flagship store on Regent Street, London which has 7 floors of sales space. It also has more than 90 international franchises. Headquartered in London; it was founded in 1760 by William Hamley as a toy store named 'Noah's Ark' on High Holborn. There have been many previous owners, including: Lines Bros, Debenhams, Burton Group, Harris Queensway, Baugur Group, Landsbanki, Groupe Ludendo, and C.Banner. Since 2019 it is owned by Indian company Reliance Retail which is part of Reliance Industries.
- Hamilton and Strathaven Railway – was a railway company established in 1857 that operated from 1860 to 1864 when it was absorbed by the Caledonian Railway.
- Hammer & Tongs – is a film and video production company.
- Hammer Film Productions – is a film and television production company. Established in 1934, its headquarters is in London.
- Hammerson – is a property development and investment company that specialises mainly in offices and retail premises. Headquartered in London; it was founded in 1942 by Lewis Hammerson. In 1953 it was listed on the London Stock Exchange.
- HandMade Films – was a film production and distribution company. Established in 1978, its headquarters was in London. It became defunct in 2013.
- Hanley Economic Building Society – is a building society offering mortgages, savings, investments, loans, and insurance. It is headquartered in Hanley, Stoke-on-Trent, Staffordshire. It was founded in 1854 by Earl Granville as The Staffordshire Potteries Economic Permanent Benefit Building Society. In 1930 it was renamed the 'Hanley Economic Building Society'.
- Hanna-Barbera Studios Europe – is an animation studio headquartered in London. Founded in 2007, it is owned by the Warner Bros. Television Studios UK division of Warner Bros. International Television Production, a subsidiary of Warner Bros. Discovery International. It is also known as Great Marlborough Productions, and previously known as Cartoon Network Studios Europe and Cartoon Network Development Studio Europe.
- Hansa Investment Company – is an investment trust company headquartered in London. It was founded in 1912 as the Alto Paranà Development Company in order to acquire a forestry business operating in Brazil. Later it became an investment trust company. In 1951 it was renamed Scottish and Mercantile Investment Company, then renamed Finsbury Trust in 1992, Hansa Trust in 2001 and finally Hansa Investment Company. It completed a takeover of Ocean Wilsons in 2025.
- Harbour Energy – is an oil and gas company headquartered in Edinburgh, Scotland. It was founded in 2014 by Noble Group and EIG Global Energy Partners. In 2021 the companies Chrysaor Holdings and Premier Oil were merged and absorbed into Harbour Energy. In 2022 its revenue was $5.3 billion, with a net income of $8.2 million.
- Hargreaves Lansdown – is a financial services company based in Bristol that sells funds, shares, and related products to retail investors. It was founded in 1981 by Peter Hargreaves and Stephen Lansdown. In 2022 its revenue was £583 million, with a net income of £215 million.
- Harpenden Building Society – is a building society offering mortgages, savings, and investments. Headquartered in Harpenden, Hertfordshire; it was founded in 1953.
- Harrison Ainslie – was an iron production, and mining company from 1893 to 1913. It became the Charcoal Iron Company.
- Harrods – is a company that operates the luxury department store Harrods located on Brompton Road, Knightsbridge, London. The store has 330 departments offering products such as clothing, food and drink, electronics, jewellery, sports gear, bridal dress, toys, books, health and beauty items, homeware, stationery, home appliances, furniture, pet accessories, and more. It also has 23 restaurants, a watch repair service, tailor, pharmacy, beauty spa and salon, and a barbers shop. It had operated Harrods Bank from 1893 to 2017. It was founded in 1849 by Charles Henry Harrod as a small store which was expanded by his son Charles Digby Harrod. In 1883 the store was destroyed by fire and then rebuilt on the same site. In 1889 it was floated on the London Stock Exchange and renamed 'Harrods Stores Ltd'. It was acquired by House of Fraser in 1959 and then by the Fayed brothers in 1985. In 2010 it was acquired by Qatar Holdings, the sovereign wealth fund of Qatar. Its subsidiaries include estate agents Harrods Estates, business and corporate aviation services provider Harrods Aviation, and aircraft charter business Air Harrods.
- Harrow and Stanmore Railway – was a railway company established in 1886 that operated from 1890 to 1899 when it was absorbed into the London and North Western Railway.
- Harry Ramsden's – is a company that operates a fast food restaurant and takeaway chain offering fish and chips and other themed dishes. It is headquartered in London. It was founded in 1928 by Harry Ramsden. In 1988 it was acquired by Merryweathers who expanded the business from one restaurant to a multinational chain. In 1989 it was floated on the London Stock Exchange. In 1999 it was acquired by Granada who merged with Compass in 2000. In 2006 it was acquired by EQT AB as part of the SSP division. In 2010 it was acquired by Bopara Ventures who sold it to Deep Blue Restaurants in 2019.
- Hartlepool Water – is a utility company (water supply). Formerly, it was also a gas supplier. Established in 1846, its headquarters is in Huntingdon, Cambridgeshire. It was formerly known as Hartlepool Gas and Water Company. Since 1997 it is owned by Anglian Water.
- Harworth Group – is a property development company specialising in the regeneration of brownfield sites. Headquartered in Rotherham; it was founded in 2004 as Harworth Estates - the property division of UK Coal. In 2012 UK Coal was restructured as Coalfield Resources which owned 24.9% of Harworth Estates until 2015 when it bought the remaining stake from the Pension Protection Fund. It then made an initial public offering for it on the London Stock Exchange and renamed it Harworth Group.
- Hat Trick Productions – is an independent television and radio production company specialising mainly in comedy. It is headquartered in London. Its television programmes include: Father Ted, Have I Got News for You, Derry Girls, Drop the Dead Donkey, The Kumars at No. 42, Outnumbered, Room 101, and Whose Line Is It Anyway?. It was founded in 1986 by Rory McGrath, Jimmy Mulville and Denise O'Donoghue. In 2016 Hat Trick made a joint venture with Jed Mercurio named HTM Television to produce drama programmes such as Trigger Point and DI Ray. In 2020 Hat Trick International made a first look distribution deal with Cardiff Productions.
- Hawk Films – is a film production company established in 1964.
- Haydock Collieries – is a coal mining company, 1899–1947. It became part of the National Coal Board.
- Hay Railway – was a horse-drawn tramway company established in 1811 that operated from 1816 to 1860 when it was absorbed into the Hereford, Hay and Brecon Railway.
- Hays – is a British multinational recruitment and human resources services company. Headquartered in London; it was founded in 1867 as an operator of wharves and warehouses. Hays later operated in the distribution of food, chemicals, commercial products as well as personnel and office services and business storage facilities. In 1987 it was the subject of a management buyout and, in 1989, an initial public offering on the London Stock Exchange. In 2003 it was restructured to be solely a recruitment and human resources services company and it was divested of its other operations.
- Hays Travel – is a company that operates an independent travel agent chain, and retail website. It is headquartered in Sunderland, Tyne and Wear. It was founded in 1980 by John Hays and is now owned and led by his widow Dame Irene Hays. In 2019 it acquired over 550 stores from Thomas Cook Group which was in liquidation. In 2020 it acquired Tailor Made Travel. Its brands include Hays Cruise, and Hays Faraway.
- Headline Pictures – is a film and television production company. Established in 2005, its headquarters is in London.
- Healey's Cornish Cyder Farm – is a producer of cider, brandy, whisky, gin, eau de vie, fruit wines, and apple juice. It also produces a variety of foodstuffs. It is located in Penhallow, Cornwall. It was established in 1986 by David and Kay Healey and remains a family-run business. Its brands include Cornish Rattler Cyder, and Pear Rattler.
- Healthcare at Home – is a pharmaceuticals supply company. Established in 1992, its headquarters is in Burton upon Trent, Staffordshire.
- Helkon SK – is a former name of Lionsgate UK, a film production and distribution company.
- Heidelberg Materials UK – is a building materials company. It was formerly a conglomerate including Imperial Tobacco, The Energy Group, Millennium Chemicals and others. It was also an asset trader, buying, restructuring and selling companies. Established in 1964, its headquarters is in London. It was formerly known as Hanson Trust. Its parent company is Heidelberg Cement.
- Helios Towers – is a telecommunications tower company that owns mobile communications towers worldwide. Headquartered in London; it was founded in 2009. It had an initial public offering on the London Stock Exchange in 2019.
- Hemdale Film Corporation – was a film production and distribution company from 1967 to 1995. Headquartered in London, it was later known as Hemdale Communications.
- Henderson Group – was a global investment management company headquartered in London. It was founded in 1934 to administer the estate of Alexander Henderson, 1st Baron Faringdon. In 1998 it was acquired by AMP Limited and branded as Henderson Global Investors. It was demerged from AMP in 2003, and then in 2017 it was merged with Janus Capital Group to form Janus Henderson.
- Henderson Far East Income – is an investment trust company focused on the Asia Pacific Region. Headquartered in London; it was founded in 1930 by the City of London Real Property Company as the C. L. R. P. Investment Trust. In 1982 Touche Remnant was appointed manager and it was renamed the TR Far East Income Trust. In 1992 Henderson Group became manager after acquiring Touche Remnant and in 1997 it was renamed Henderson Far East Income. Since 2017 it is managed by Janus Henderson.
- Henderson Smaller Companies Investment Trust – is an investment trust focused on investments in smaller companies. It was founded in 1887 as The Trustees Corporation. In 1982 there was a management change to Touche Remnant and it was renamed TR Trustees Corporation and then TR Smaller Companies Investment Trust in 1990. It was brought under the management of Henderson Group after Henderson bought Touche Remnant in 1992, and in 1997 was renamed Henderson Smaller Companies Investment Trust. Since 2017 it is managed by Janus Henderson.
- Henleys Clothing – was a men and womenswear company (clothes and shoes) from 1996 to 2011. Its headquarters was in Manchester.
- Henry Boot – is a property development, construction, and property management company. It is headquartered in Sheffield, South Yorkshire. It was founded in 1886 by Henry Boot. It expanded significantly during WWI with military and civil engineering contracts. After the war it was floated on the London Stock Exchange and became a major house builder in both the public and private sectors. After WWII it was focused on general construction including in Europe. In 1965 it founded the Banner Building Society which was sold in 1982. The house building division was sold to Wilson Bowden in 2003. Its remaining operations are: Henry Boot Developments (property development), Hallam Land Management (land and planning promotion), Henry Boot Construction (public and private sectors), Banner Plant Ltd (plant hire), Stonebridge Homes Ltd (housing), and Road Link (maintaining the A69). In 2021 its total revenue was £230 million, with a net income of £30 million.
- Henry's House – is a public relations company. Established in 1998, its headquarters is in London.
- Herald Investment Trust – is an investment trust established in 1994.
- Hereford, Hay and Brecon Railway – was a railway company established in 1859 that operated from 1862 to 1865 when it was amalgamated with the Brecon and Merthyr Railway.
- Heyday Films – is a film production company. Established in 1996, its headquarters is in London.
- Hg Capital Trust – is an investment trust focused on unquoted investments. It was founded in 1989 and is managed by Hg.
- HICL Infrastructure Company – is an investment trust company (infrastructure investments). It was established in 2006.
- Hi-Gen Power – was an energy company (alternative energy). Established in 2009, it is now defunct. Its headquarters was in London.
- Highland Railway – was a railway company established in 1865 by a merger of the Inverness and Aberdeen Junction Railway and the Inverness and Perth Junction Railway. It operated from 1865 to 1923 when it was absorbed into the London, Midland and Scottish Railway.
- Hikma Pharmaceuticals – is a British multinational company that manufactures pharmaceutical products. It is headquartered in London. It was founded in 1978 by Samih Darwazah in Amman, Jordan. Its acquisitions include Instituto Biochimico Pavese Pharma, Jazeera Pharmaceutical Industries, APM, Alkan Pharma, Thymoorgan, Ribosepharm, Multi-Source Injectables, Promopharm, and others. In 2011 it founded the Al Dar Al Arabia Pharmaceutical Manufacturing Company in Algeria. In 2022 its revenue was $2.5 billion, with a net income of $191 million.
- Hill & Smith – is a company that designs, manufactures and supplies products for the construction and infrastructure industries. It is headquartered in Solihull, West Midlands. It was founded in 1824 by Edward Hill as Hills Ironworks at Brierley Hill. Henry Smith joined the business which became Hill & Smith. Its acquisitions include Techspan Systems, Expamet, Hull Galvanising, ATG Access, National Signal Inc, and Widnes Galvanising. In 2022 its revenue was £732 million, with a net income of £56 million.
- Hill Samuel – is a banking company established in 1932. Since 1995 it is a subsidiary of Lloyds Banking Group and headquartered in London.
- Hilton Food Group – is a food processing and packaging company headquartered in Huntingdon, Cambridgeshire. It was founded in 1994 to operate a meat packing factory. In 2017 it acquired Seachill, a supplier of chilled and frozen salmon. In 2022 its revenue was £3.8 billion, with a net income of £19 million.
- Hinckley and Rugby Building Society – is a building society offering mortgages, and savings. It is headquartered in Hinckley, Leicestershire. It was founded in 1983 by the merger of the Hinckley Building Society (founded in 1865) with the Rugby Provident Building Society (founded in 1861).
- Hiscox - is an Anglo–Bermudian insurance company headquartered in Hamilton, Bermuda. It is an underwriter at Lloyd's of London, and originated as part of the Roberts agency in 1901. In 2022 its revenue was £2.7 billion, with a net income of £41.7 million.
- Hochschild Mining – is a silver and gold mining company. Established in 1911, its headquarters is in London. In 2019 its revenue was $755 million, with total income of $41 million.
- Hodge Bank – is the trading name of Julian Hodge Bank Ltd.
- Holland & Barrett International (trading as Holland & Barrett) – is a company that operates a multinational retail store chain and retail website offering health foods, vitamins, supplements, homeopathy products, vegetarian and vegan foods, and beauty products. It also produces products for its own brand. It is headquartered in Nuneaton, Warwickshire. It was founded in 1870 by Alfred Slapps Barrett and Major William Holland as a groceries and clothes business. It became a health products retailer in the 1970s when it was acquired by Booker. It was acquired by Lloyds Pharmacy in 1992; NBTY in 1997; and The Carlyle Group in 2010. Then in 2010 it was acquired by L1 Retail which is part of LetterOne.
- Hollywood Bowl Group – is an entertainment company that runs the Hollywood Bowl branded tenpin bowling centres and Puttstars branded minigolf centres in the UK as well as Splitsville branded bowling centres in Canada. Headquartered in Hemel Hempstead; it was founded in 1960 by AMF Bowling. In 2010 AMF Bowling UK acquired the Hollywood Bowl business from Mitchells & Butlers and combined the companies into The Original Bowling Company (TOBC). In 2015 TOBC acquired rival Bowlplex and was renamed Hollywood Bowl Group with the centres rebranded as Hollywood Bowl. In 2022 it acquired the Canadian Splitsville branded bowling centres.
- Home Bargains – is a division of TJ Morris that operates a retail discount store chain offering grocery and general merchandise. It is headquartered in Liverpool. It was founded in 1976 by Tom Morris as Home Bargain. In 1995 it was renamed Home Bargains.
- Horizon Discovery – is a biotechnology company (gene editing, producing genetically modified cells and organisms). Established in 2005, its headquarters is in Cambridge.
- Hotel Chocolat – is a company that produces chocolate and other cocoa related products to sell in its multinational chain of stores, cafes, restaurants, outlets, and a retail website. It also has a cocoa farm, and a hotel. It is headquartered in Royston, Hertfordshire. It was founded in 1993 by Angus Thirlwell and Peter Harris as Chocolate Express. In 2003 it was rebranded as Hotel Chocolat. In 2016 it was floated on the London Stock Exchange. In 2023 it was acquired by Mars Inc.
- Hovis – is a limited company that produces flour and bread and licenses the production of Hovis Biscuits. It was founded in Stoke-on-Trent before mass production began in Macclesfield, Cheshire in 1886. It became part of Rank Hovis McDougall in 1962, was purchased by Premier Foods in 2007 and is now owned by Endless LLP. It is now headquartered in High Wycombe, Buckinghamshire.
- Howdens Joinery – is the multinational parent company of the Howdens Joinery business which is a supplier of kitchens, bathroom cabinets, and joinery products to the building trade. It is headquartered in London. It was founded in 1995 by Matthew Ingle as a business unit within MFI. In 2006 the name of MFI was changed to Galiform, and in 2010 it was changed to Howden Joinery Group. It trades in Belgium and France as Howdens Cuisines. In 2022 its revenue was £2.3 billion, with a net income of £374 million.
- H. P. Bulmer – is a cider producer headquartered in London. It was founded in 1887 in Hereford by Henry Percival Bulmer. Since 2008 it is owned by Heineken International. Its brands include Bulmers, Strongbow, Scrumpy Jack, Woodpecker Cider, and others.
- H. Samuel – is a company that operates a jewellery retail store chain and retail website. It is headquartered in Borehamwood, Hertfordshire. Its roots are in a mid 1800s clockmaking and silversmith business run by Moses and Lewis Samuel in Liverpool. Harriet Samuel, Moses' daughter-in-law, took over the business and began its expansion. In 1948 it was floated on the London Stock Exchange. In 1984 it acquired the James Walker Group. In 1986 it was acquired by Ratners Jewellers which rebranded as the Signet Group in 1992 with the remaining Ratners stores rebranded as H.Samuel.
- HTK. – is a software as a service company operating phone messaging and voice response services. It is headquartered in Ipswich, Suffolk. It was founded in 1996 by Marlon Bowser and Adrian Gregory.
- Hull and Barnsley Railway – was a railway company established in 1880 as the Hull, Barnsley and West Riding Junction Railway and Dock Company. It started operating in 1885 and in 1905 was renamed the Hull and Barnsley Railway. In 1922 it was absorbed into the North Eastern Railway which itself was absorbed into the London and North Eastern Railway in 1923.
- Hull and South Yorkshire Extension Railway – was a railway company established in 1897 that was absorbed into the Hull and Barnsley Railway in 1898.
- Hulton Colliery Company – was a coal mining company. Established in 1858, it is now defunct.
- Hunting – is a manufacturer and supplier of products and services to the oil and gas, aerospace, medical, and power generation industries. Headquartered in London and Houston US; it was founded in 1874 by Charles Hunting as a shipping business. Over the years it operated as an oil tanker broker, aircraft manufacturer, running an airline, aerial surveyor, and as a defence contractor. Most of those operations have been divested.
- Huntsworth – is a public relations company. Established in 1974, its headquarters is in London.
- Hurricane Films – is a film production company. Established in 2000, its headquarters is in Liverpool.
- H. Weston & Sons - is a producer of cider and perry based in Much Marcle, Herefordshire. It was founded in 1880 by Henry Weston and is still owned and run by the Weston family. Its brands include Old Rosie, Henry Westons Vintage, Stowford Press, and others.

== I ==
- IAG Cargo – is a cargo airline company. Established in 2011, it was formed from the merger of British Airways World Cargo and Iberia Cargo. Its parent company is International Airlines Group.
- Iceland Foods Ltd (trading as Iceland) – is a company that operates a supermarket chain and retail website offering mainly frozen foods as well as non-frozen grocery products. It also produces own brand products, and operates another store chain called Food Warehouse. Previously it also sold kitchen appliances. It is headquartered in Deeside, Wales. It was founded in 1970 by Sir Malcolm Walker and Peter Hinchcliffe. It was floated on the London Stock Exchange in 1984. In 2000 it was merged with Booker plc to form The Big Food Group (Iceland's holding company) which was acquired by Baugur Group in 2005. Baugur Group collapsed in 2009 leaving Iceland owned by Icelandic banks Landsbanki and Glitnir until a consortium including Malcolm Walker and Graham Kirkham bought their stake. Its acquisitions include: St. Catherine's Freezer Centres, Orchard Frozen Foods, and Bejam. In 2022 its revenue was £3.5 billion, with a net income loss of £3.6 million.
- ICG – is a private equity investment firm headquartered in London. It was founded in 1989 as Intermediate Capital Group. In 2025 it was renamed ICG. In 2026 it had $126 billion of assets under management.
- ICG Enterprise Trust plc – is an investment trust focused on investments in unquoted companies. Established in 1981, it is headquartered in London. It was formerly the Graphite Enterprise Trust under the management of Graphite Capital. In 2016 Intermediate Capital Group took over the management of the trust which was renamed the ICG Enterprise Trust.
- Ideal Film Company (aka Ideal Films) – was a film production and distribution company from 1911 to 1934. Its headquarters was in London.
- Ideal Homes – was a house building company. It was founded in 1929 by Leo Meyer and Philip Shepherd as New Ideal Homesteads. In 1934 it was floated on the London Stock Exchange under the new holding company Ideal Building & Land Development. It expanded during the 1930s, and during WWII fulfilled government contracts. After the war it focused on the purchase and sale of tenanted properties. Also, it built public housing for local authorities through its subsidiary Carlton Contractors. In the 1950s it moved back to private house building. In 1967 it was acquired by Trafalgar House. Its own acquisitions included Comben Homes and Broseley Estates Limited. In 1996 Ideal Homes was acquired by Persimmon plc.
- IG Group – is a financial services company. Established in 1974, its headquarters is in London. In 2019 its revenue was £488 million, with net income of £158 million.
- IHG Hotels & Resorts – is the brand name of Intercontinental Hotel Group.
- IMI plc – is an engineering company headquartered in Birmingham. Its 3 business divisions are critical engineering, precision engineering, and hydronic engineering. It was founded in 1862 by George Kynoch as a percussion cap factory trading as Kynoch. The business was diversified into manufacturing a range of products until in the early 20th century it had an expertise in metallurgy. After World War I it merged with Nobel Enterprises. In 1926 it acquired Eley Brothers, an ammunitions manufacturer. Then named Nobel Explosives, it was merged with 3 other companies to form Imperial Chemical Industries (ICI) where it operated as ICI Metals. In 1962 it was renamed Imperial Metal Industries Ltd (IMI). In 1978 it became fully independent from ICI. In 2022 its revenue was £2 billion, with a net income of £226 million.
- Immunocore – is a biotechnology company (biological drugs). Established in 2008, its headquarters is in Oxford.
- Impax Environmental Markets plc – is an investment trust focused on environmental companies in North America, Europe, and Asia. It was founded in 2002.
- Imperial Brands - is a multinational tobacco company also involved in logistics through one of its 5 subsidiaries Logista. It was established in 1901 through the amalgamation of 13 separate tobacco companies to form Imperial Tobacco Group. Headquartered in Bristol, its 2020 revenue was £32.5 billion, with a net income of £1.5 billion.
- Imperial Chemical Industries (ICI) – is a chemicals manufacturing company (paints, pharmaceuticals, polymers, food ingredients, electronic materials, agrochemicals, fabrics, motorcycles), 1926–2008. Headquartered in London, in 2008 it was acquired by Akzo Nobel.
- Inchcape plc – is a British multinational automotive distribution, retail, and services company headquartered in London. It was founded in 1847 by William Mackinnon and Robert Mackenzie as the Mackinnon Mackenzie Company based in Calcutta, India. Later restructured as Inchcape plc, it had operations in shipping, timber, business machines, automotive distribution and services, product testing, insurance brokerage, and bottling. From the 1980s it divested all operations except its automotive divisions. In 2022 its revenue was £8.1 billion, with a net income of –£6.2 million.
- Inchcape Shipping Services – is a British multinational ports and marine management company headquartered in London. It was founded in 1947 as part of the Mackinnon Mackenzie Company. It is now owned by Epiris LLP.
- Independent Film Distribution – was a film distribution company from 1950 to 1959.
- Ineos Group Ltd – is a British multinational conglomerate producing chemical substances, petrochemicals, and plastics. It also has interests in fuel, energy, oil distribution, packaging and food, construction, automobiles, pharmaceuticals, textiles, and professional sports. It consists of about 20 standalone business units; each with its own board. Headquartered in London; it was founded in 1998 by Sir Jim Ratcliffe. It has made many acquisitions of companies and divisions such as the chemical businesses of BP, ICI, and BASF. Its joint ventures include Petroineos with PetroChina, and PQ Corporation. It also owns INEOS Styrolution.
- Initial Entertainment Group - was a film and television production company. See GK Films.
- Informa plc – is a publishing, business intelligence, and exhibitions company headquartered in London. It owns a number of brands including CRC Press, Fan Expo HQ, Game Developers Conference, Routledge, and Taylor & Francis. In 2018 it acquired UBM plc. It was founded in 1998 by the merger of IBC Group plc with LLP Group plc. In 2022 its revenue was £2.2 billion, with a net income of £1.6 billion.
- IntegraFin Holdings plc – is a finance company that owns Integral Financial Arrangements Ltd which operates the Transact investment platform. Headquartered in London; it was founded in 1990 by Mike Howard. In 2022 its revenue was £133 million, with a net income of £44 million.
- Intercontinental Hotel Group plc – is a British multinational hospitality company managing, franchising, or owning hotels and resorts. It is headquartered in Windsor, Berkshire. It was founded in 2003 from a split of Six Continents Hotels plc, having originated as a part of Bass Charrington.
- Intermediate Capital Group – is the former name of ICG.
- International Airlines Group (AIG; its full name is International Consolidated Airlines Group) – is an Anglo-Spanish multinational airlines holding company. Established in 2011, its headquarters are in London and Madrid, Spain. It was formed from the merger of British Airways and Iberia. In 2019 its revenue was £25.5 billion, with a net income of £1.7 billion.
- International Game Technology – is a gaming company. Established in 1990, its headquarters is in London.
- International Personal Finance – is an international financial services company providing home credit and digital consumer credit. Headquartered in Leeds West Yorkshire; it was founded in 1997 as a division of Provident Financial. In 2007 it was demerged and listed on the London Stock Exchange.
- International Public Partnerships – is an investment company focused on infrastructure. Headquartered in London; it was founded in 2006 as Babcock & Brown Public Partnerships. In 2009 it was renamed International Public Partnerships.
- Intertek Group plc – is a British multinational assurance, inspection, testing, and certification company headquartered in London. It was formerly part of Inchcape plc as Inchcape Testing Services. In 2022 its revenue was £3.1 billion, with a net income of £306 million.
- Inver House Distillers Ltd - is a producer of Scotch whisky headquartered in Airdrie, Scotland. It is a subsidiary of ThaiBev. It was established in 1964 as a subsidiary of US company Publicker Industries. It owns 5 distilleries: Balblair distillery, Balmenach distillery, Knockdhu distillery, Old Pulteney distillery, and Speyburn distillery.
- Invergarry and Fort Augustus Railway – was a railway company established in 1896 that operated from 1903 to 1914 when it was absorbed by the North British Railway.
- Inverness and Aberdeen Junction Railway – was a railway company established in 1856 that operated from 1857 to 1865 when it was amalgamated with the Inverness and Perth Junction Railway to form the Highland Railway.
- Inverness and Nairn Railway – was a railway company established in 1854 that operated from 1855 to 1861 when it was absorbed into the Inverness and Aberdeen Junction Railway.
- Inverness and Perth Junction Railway – was a railway company established in 1861 that operated from 1863 to 1865 when it was amalgamated with the Inverness and Aberdeen Junction Railway to form the Highland Railway.
- Inverness and Ross-shire Railway – was a railway company established in 1860 that only operated from 11 June to 30 June 1862 when it was amalgamated with the Inverness and Aberdeen Junction Railway.
- Invesco Asia Dragon Trust – is an investment trust company focused on Far East companies. It was founded in 2024 from a merger of Invesco Asia Trust with Asia Dragon Trust. Invesco Asia Trust had been founded in 1995 while Asia Dragon Trust had been founded in 1987.
- Investec plc – is an Anglo-South African international financial services company offering banking and wealth management services. It is headquartered in London and Sandton, South Africa. It is dual listed on the London Stock Exchange and the Johannesburg Stock Exchange. The dual listed company's structure has Investec plc as the holding company for the majority of the group's non-South African operations, and Investec Ltd as the holding company for the majority of the Group's South African operations. It was founded in 1974 by Larry Nestadt, Errol Grolman, and Ian Kantor in Johannesburg. In 1988 Investec Bank Ltd was restructured into Investec Group Ltd. In 1992 it entered the UK market with the acquisition of Allied Trust Bank Ltd. Its later acquisitions include Guinness Mahon, Hambros plc, Kensington Group plc, Experien (pty) Ltd, NCB, and Amicus Commercial Finance. In 2020 the asset management business was demerged and listed as Ninety One plc. In 2023 Rathbones acquired Investec's wealth and investment businesses in the UK, and Channel Islands. In 2022 Investec's revenue was £1.9 billion, with a net income of £556 million.
- IP Group – is an intellectual property company that provides early-stage investment to science and technology companies. It specialises in the commercialisation of intellectual property originating from universities and research institutions particularly in deep technology, life sciences, and clean technology. Headquartered in London; it was founded in 2001 by David Norwood and Beeson Gregory as IP21PO. Its acquisitions include: Top Technology Ventures, Fusion IP, Parkwalk Advisors, Touchstone Innovations, and Techtran. In 2017 it established IP Group Australia for its Australian investments.
- Isle of Arran Distillers Ltd – is a producer of Scotch whisky that owns the Arran distillery located in Lochranza, Isle of Arran, Scotland. The distillery was founded in 1995 by Harold Currie.
- Isle of Man Film – is a film production and finance company. Established in 1995, its headquarters is in the Isle of Man.
- Isle of Wight Central Railway – was a railway established in 1887 by the merging of the Cowes and Newport Railway, the Ryde and Newport Railway and the Isle of Wight (Newport Junction) Railway. It also worked the Freshwater, Yarmouth and Newport Railway until 1913 and the same year acquired the Newport, Godshill and St.Lawrence Railway. It operated until 1923 when it was absorbed by the Southern Railway.
- Isle of Wight (Newport Junction) Railway – was a railway company established in 1868 that operated from 1875 to 1887 when it was merged with the Cowes and Newport Railway and the Ryde and Newport Railway to form the Isle of Wight Central Railway.
- Isle of Wight Railway – was a railway company established in 1860 as the Isle of Wight Eastern Junction Railway. In 1863 it was renamed the Isle of Wight Railway and began operating in 1864. It acquired the railway and quays of the Brading Harbour and Railway Company in 1898. It was absorbed into the Southern Railway in 1923.
- ITC Entertainment (aka Incorporated Television Company (ITC)) - was a television and film production and distribution company from 1954 to 1998. Its headquarters was in London.
- ITH Pharma – is a pharmaceuticals company (intravenous medication). Established in 2008, its headquarters is in London.
- Ithaca Energy – is an oil and gas company operating in the North Sea by exploration, development, and extraction. Headquartered in Aberdeen, Scotland; it was founded in 2004 in Canada before moving to the UK in 2008. In 2017 it was acquired by Delek Group and became its subsidiary. In 2022 it acquired Siccar Point Energy and gained stakes in the Rosebank oil and gas field and the Cambo oil field.
- Itsu – is a chain of East Asian inspired fast food shops and restaurants, and is a grocery retail company. It is headquartered in London. It was founded in 1997 by Julian Metcalfe. From 2010 it was part of Metcalfe's Food Company until it was split out as a separate company in 2015.
- ITV – is a media company that is a television broadcaster that holds 13 of the 15 regional television licenses that make up the ITV network. It operates the broadcast channels: ITV1, ITV2, ITV3, ITV4, and ITV Quiz as well as additional streaming channels. It is the oldest and largest UK commercial terrestrial television network. It has also been a producer of television programmes for ITV and other broadcasters worldwide through ITV Studios. Headquartered in London; it was founded in 2004 as a result of Granada purchasing Carlton. This followed a number of mergers and acquisitions of companies in the ITV network from 1994 to 2004 that left Granada and Carlton as the largest constituents. In 2015 it purchased UTV and, in 2022, launched its latest streaming service ITVX. In 2026 it announced the sale of its media and entertainment division which includes the broadcasting network to Sky which is a subsidiary of Comcast. ITV studios is not included in the sale and will become a separate company.
- ITV Studios – is a British multinational media company that produces and distributes television programmes for ITV and other broadcasters worldwide. It has bases in 12 countries and has 60 production brands. Headquartered in London; it was formed through the amalgamation of the production divisions of the ITV regional licensee companies from 1994 to 2004 and later. It was owned by ITV but in 2026 it was announced that as part of the purchase of ITV by Sky it would become a separate company. Among its best known programmes are Coronation Street, Emmerdale, Agatha Christie's Marple, Agatha Christie's Poirot, I'm a Celebrity...Get Me Out of Here!, The Voice, The Chase, Parkinson, A Touch of Frost, Heartbeat and Mr Selfridge.
- iwoca – is a business finance provider operating in the UK and Germany that lends to small and medium-sized businesses. Established in 2011; it is headquartered in London.
- IXICO – is a biotechnology (data analytics for clinical research). Established in 2004, its headquarters is in London.

== J ==
- J & G Grant Ltd – is a Scotch whisky producer that owns the Glenfarclas distillery in Ballindalloch, Scotland. The distillery dates from before 1791 and since 1865 it has been owned by John Grant and his descendants.
- Jacobs & Turner Ltd (trading as Trespass) – is a clothing company that produces the Trespass brand of sportwear and outdoor clothing that specialises in skiwear, water-proof jackets, fleece, walking boots, camping goods, and accessories. It operates a multinational clothing retail chain, and a retail website. It is headquartered in Glasgow, Scotland. It was founded in 1938 as a producer of technical workwear. In 1984 it introduced the Trespass brand and moved into producing and selling sportswear and outdoor clothing.
- JAG Communications – was a mobile phones retail company from 1989 to 2010. It was headquartered at Perranporth, Cornwall.
- James Hay Partnership – is a financial services company (pension products, investment). Established in 1979, its headquarters is in Salisbury, Wiltshire. In 1990 it became part of Abbey National and then Santander UK before being sold to the IFG Group plc in 2010.
- James Woolley, Sons and Co. – was a manufacturing company (pharmaceuticals, surgical equipment, trusses, talcum powder, cordials, photographic equipment), from 1833 to 1962. Headquartered in Manchester, in 1962 it was acquired by British Drug Houses.
- Janus Henderson – is a British-American global asset-management group offering financial products. Henderson was founded in 1934 to manage the assets of London financier Alexander Henderson after his death and later became Henderson Global Investors. Janus Capital was founded in 1969 in Denver, Colorado. In 2017 Janus Capital Group merged with Henderson Group to form Janus Henderson Group. It is owned by Trian Partners.
- JBA Motors – was a manufacturing company (automobile production) from 1982 to 2007. Established in Norwich, Norfolk, it was later headquartered in Standish, Greater Manchester. It was formerly known as JBA Engineering.
- J Barbour & Sons Ltd – is a private company that manufactures waxed cotton jackets, other clothing, footwear, and accessories. It is headquartered in Simonside, South Shields. It was founded in 1894 by J Barbour as an importer of oil cloth.
- J.C. Bamford Excavators Ltd (trading as JCB) – is a multinational manufacturer of equipment for construction, agriculture, waste handling, and demolition. Its products include: mechanical backhoes, excavators, forklift trucks, dumpsters, loaders, tractors, diesel engines, diesel generators, axles and gearboxes. It is headquartered in Rocester, Staffordshire. It was founded in 1945 by Joseph Cyril Bamford as Joseph Cyril Bamford Excavators Ltd. Its subsidiaries include JCB Finance, and JCB Insurance Services.
- JC Vickery – is a consumer goods company. Established in 1890, its headquarters is in London.
- JD Sports Fashion - is a sports fashion retail company. Established in 1981, its headquarters is in Burnley, Greater Manchester. It has 23 subsidiaries and is majority owned by Pentland Group. In 2020 its revenue was £6.1 billion, with a net income of £250.7 million.
- JD Wetherspoon plc (trading as Wetherspoons or Wetherspoon) – is a hospitality company that operates a chain of Wetherspoon pubs, bars, and hotels. It also operates Lloyds No.1 bars. It is headquartered in Watford, Hertfordshire. It was founded in 1979 by Tim Martin. In 2022 its revenue was £1.7 billion, with a net income of £19.3 million.
- Jedburgh Railway – was a railway company established in 1855. It began operating in 1856 with the line worked by the North British Railway who absorbed it in 1860.
- John Bradley & Co – was an ironworks, mining, and freight railway company from 1800 to 1966. Its headquarters was in Stourbridge.
- John Brogden and Sons – was a railway contractors, mining, and iron smelting company from 1828 to 1880. Its headquarters was in London.
- John Laing Group – is an infrastructure company that invests in, develops, and operates privately financed public sector infrastructure projects including: roads, railways, hospitals, and schools. It is headquartered in London. It was founded in 1848 by James Laing and his wife Ann Laing as a house building business. It was involved in reconstruction during and after World War II. It diversified into road construction and building power stations as well as house building before focusing on public sector infrastructure. In 2006 it was acquired by Henderson Group and then in 2021 it was acquired by KKR & Co..
- John Lewis Partnership – is a privately held plc owned by a trust on behalf of its employees. It is a retail company that operates John Lewis & Partners, Waitrose & Partners, and other retail services. Founded by John Spedan Lewis in 1929, it is headquartered in Westminster, London. In 2022 its total revenue was £10.8 billion, with a net income of –£67.8 million.
- John Lewis & Partners – is a retailer of general merchandise founded in 1864 by John Lewis. Headquartered in London, it is part of the John Lewis Partnership. In 2017 its total revenue was £3.7 billion, with an operating income of £243.2 million.
- Johnson Matthey – is a British multinational speciality chemicals and sustainable technologies company headquartered in London. Its products include emissions control catalysts, industrial catalysts, absorbents, process technologies, fine chemicals, fuel cell technology, and battery technology. Its origins date to 1817 when Percival Norton Johnson set up as a gold assayer in London. In 1851 George Matthey became a partner in the firm, which was renamed Johnson & Matthey. In 1852 it was appointed official assayer and refiner to the Bank of England. In the 1960s a banking subsidiary was founded as Johnson Matthey Bankers which, in 1984, was facing insolvency before being bought by the Bank of England for £1. In 2022 Johnson Matthey's revenue was £16 billion, with a net income of -£101 million.
- Johnson Service Group – is a specialist textile rental and laundry services company. It provides workwear and hygiene services, as well as linen services to the hospitalty and catering sectors. Headquartered in Preston Brook, Cheshire; it was founded in 1817 by William Johnson as a firm of silk dyers in Liverpool. In 1920 it acquired several dry cleaning businesses and over the next 60 years expanded to become the largest dry cleaning business in the UK. In 1953 it was renamed Johnson Group Cleaners and then Johnson Service Group in 1998. It acquired Sketchley Dry Cleaning from Timpson in 2004 but began divesting its dry cleaning business in 2006. By February 2017 it had sold all of its stores such as Johnson Cleaners, and Jeeves of Belgravia, with the main buyer being Timpson .
- JPMorgan American Investment Trust plc – is an investment trust company focused on investments in North America. Headquartered in London; it was established in 1881 as the Sterling Trust. When Robert Fleming & Co. was appointed manager it was renamed the Fleming American Investment Trust in 1982. Since 2000 it is managed by JPMorgan Chase and adopted its current name in 2006.
- JPMorgan Asia Growth & Income – is an investment trust company focused on Asia excluding Japan. Headquartered in London; it was established in 1997 by Robert Fleming & Co. as the Fleming Asian Investment Trust. Since 2000 it is managed by JPMorgan Chase. In 2020 it was renamed from JPMorgan Asian Investment Trust to its current name.
- JPMorgan Claverhouse Investment Trust – is an investment trust company focused on UK equity investments. Headquartered in London; it was founded in 1963 by Robert Fleming & Co. as the Claverhouse Investment Trust. Since 2000 it is managed by JPMorgan Chase.
- JPMorgan Emerging Europe, Middle East & Africa Securities – is an investment trust company. Headquartered in London; it was established in 2002 as JPMorgan Fleming Russia Securities with a focus on Russian investments. Following the Russian invasion of Ukraine it was refocused on Emerging Europe, the Middle East, and Africa and adopted its current name.
- JPMorgan Emerging Markets Dividend Income – is an investment trust company focused on companies with high dividend yields in emerging markets. Headquartered in London; it was established in 2010 as the JPMorgan Global Emerging Markets Income Trust. It adopted its current name in 2026.
- JPMorgan Emerging Markets Growth & Income – is an investment trust company focused on emerging markets. Headquartered in London; it was established in 1991 as the Fleming Emerging Markets Investment Trust. Since 2000 it is managed by JPMorgan Chase. In 2026 it was renamed from JPMorgan Emerging Markets Investment Trust to its current name.
- JPMorgan European Discovery Trust plc – is an investment trust focused on smaller European companies. It was established in 1990 as the Fleming European Fledgeling Investment Trust under the management of Robert Fleming & Co.. Since 2000 it is managed by JPMorgan Chase. It was renamed the JPMorgan European Fledgling Investment Trust, then the JPMorgan European Smaller Companies Trust before adopting its current name in 2021.
- JPMorgan European Growth & Income – is an investment trust company focused on Europe. Headquartered in London; it was established in 1929 as the London and Holyrood Trust. When Robert Fleming & Co. was appointed manager it was renamed the Fleming Universal Investment Trust, and then the Fleming Continental European Investment Trust. Since 2000 it is managed by JPMorgan Chase. It was renamed the JPMorgan Continental European Investment Trust, then the JPMorgan European Investment Trust before adopting its current name in 2022.
- JPMorgan Global Growth & Income plc – is an investment trust that invests in companies worldwide. It was founded in 1887 as the United British Securities Trust. It was later renamed the Fleming Overseas Investment Trust in 1982, the JPMorgan Fleming Overseas Investment Trust in 2003, the JPMorgan Overseas Investment Trust in 2006, before being given its current name in 2016. In 2022 it was merged with the Scottish Investment Trust.
- JPMorgan India Growth & Income – is an investment trust focused on India. Headquartered in London; it was established in 1994 as the Fleming Indian Investment Trust under the management of Robert Fleming & Co. Since 2000 it is managed by JPMorgan Chase firstly as the JPMorgan Fleming Indian Investment Trust, then JP Morgan Indian Investment Trust, until 2025 when it adopted its current name.
- JPMorgan Japanese Investment Trust – is an investment trust focused on Japan. Headquartered in London; it was established in 1927 as the Capital & National Trust. When Robert Fleming & Co. was appointed manager it was renamed the Fleming Japanese Investment Trust in 1985. Since 2000 it is managed by JPMorgan Chase and adopted its current name in 2006.
- JTC Group – is a financial services company providing fund administration services. It is located in Jersey. It was founded in 1987 as Jersey Trust Company. Its acquisitions include Merrill Lynch's international trust and wealth structuring business, Sanne Group's private client business, and NES Financial. In August 2026 JTC was acquired by Permira and the Canada Pension Plan Investment Board for £2.3 billion.
- Julian Hodge Bank Ltd (trading as Hodge Bank) – is a bank offering mortgages, and savings. Headquartered in Cardiff, Wales; it was founded in 1987 by Sir Julian Hodge.
- Jupiter Fund Management – is a fund management group offering equity and bond investments through a range of its own mutual funds and investment companies. It also offers wealth management services. Headquartered in London; it was founded in 1985 by John Duffield who sold it to Commerzbank in two tranches in 1995 and 2000. It was bought out of Commerzbank through a management buy out in 2007 and, in 2010, was listed on the London Stock Exchange. In 2020 it acquired Merian Global Investers. Its assets under management had reached £54 billion in 2025.
