= List of displayed Grumman S-2 Trackers =

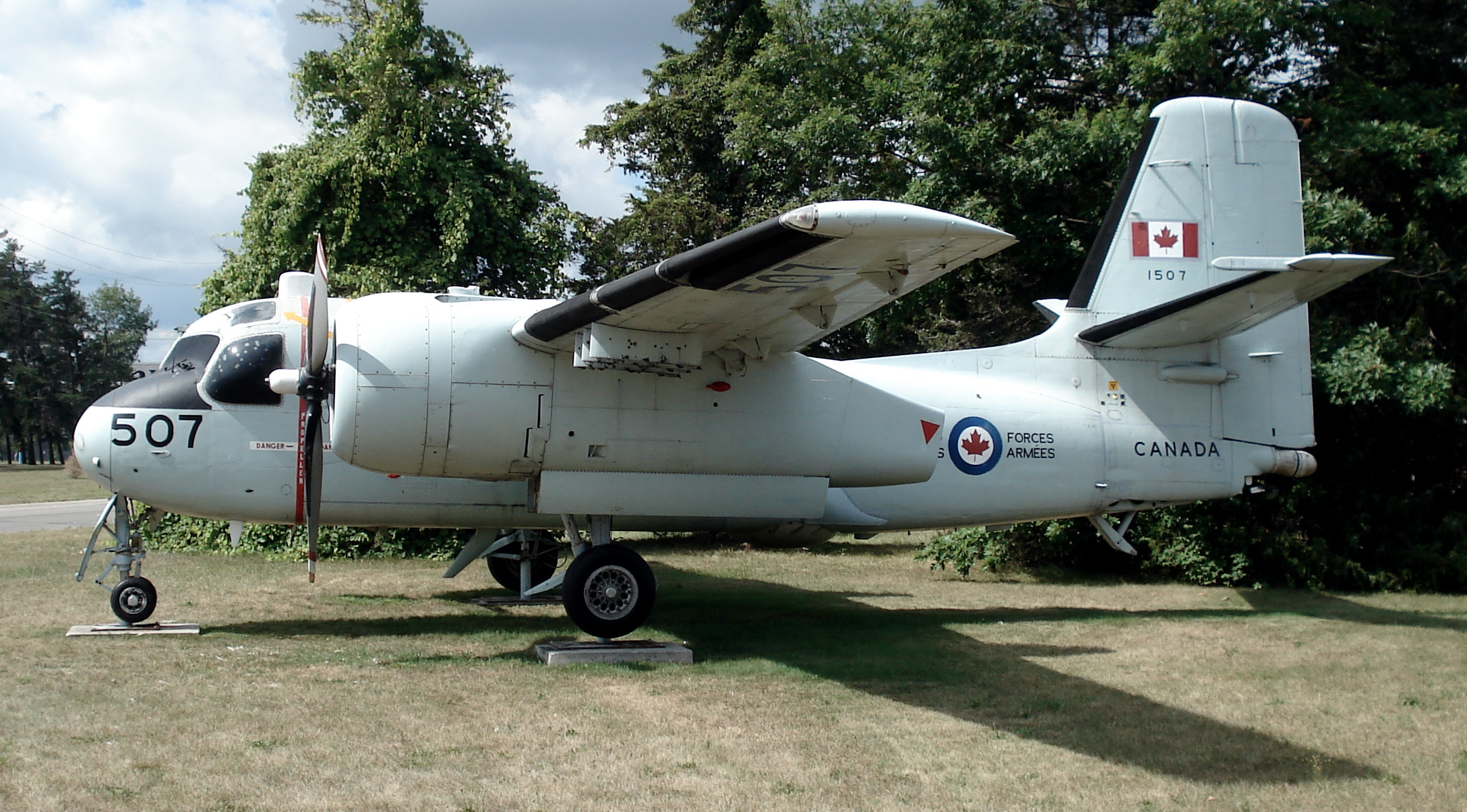
Canadian-made CS2F-2 Tracker on static display at Base Borden Military Museum

The Grumman S-2 Tracker is an American twin-engine anti-submarine warfare aircraft designed for the United States Navy. Although still in active service in South America, the S-2 has been retired elsewhere, and a number of aircraft are now on public display.

== Surviving aircraft ==
=== Argentina ===
- US-2A Tracker 0510/6-G-52 of the Argentine Naval Aviation at Naval Aviation Museum, Bahía Blanca

=== Australia ===
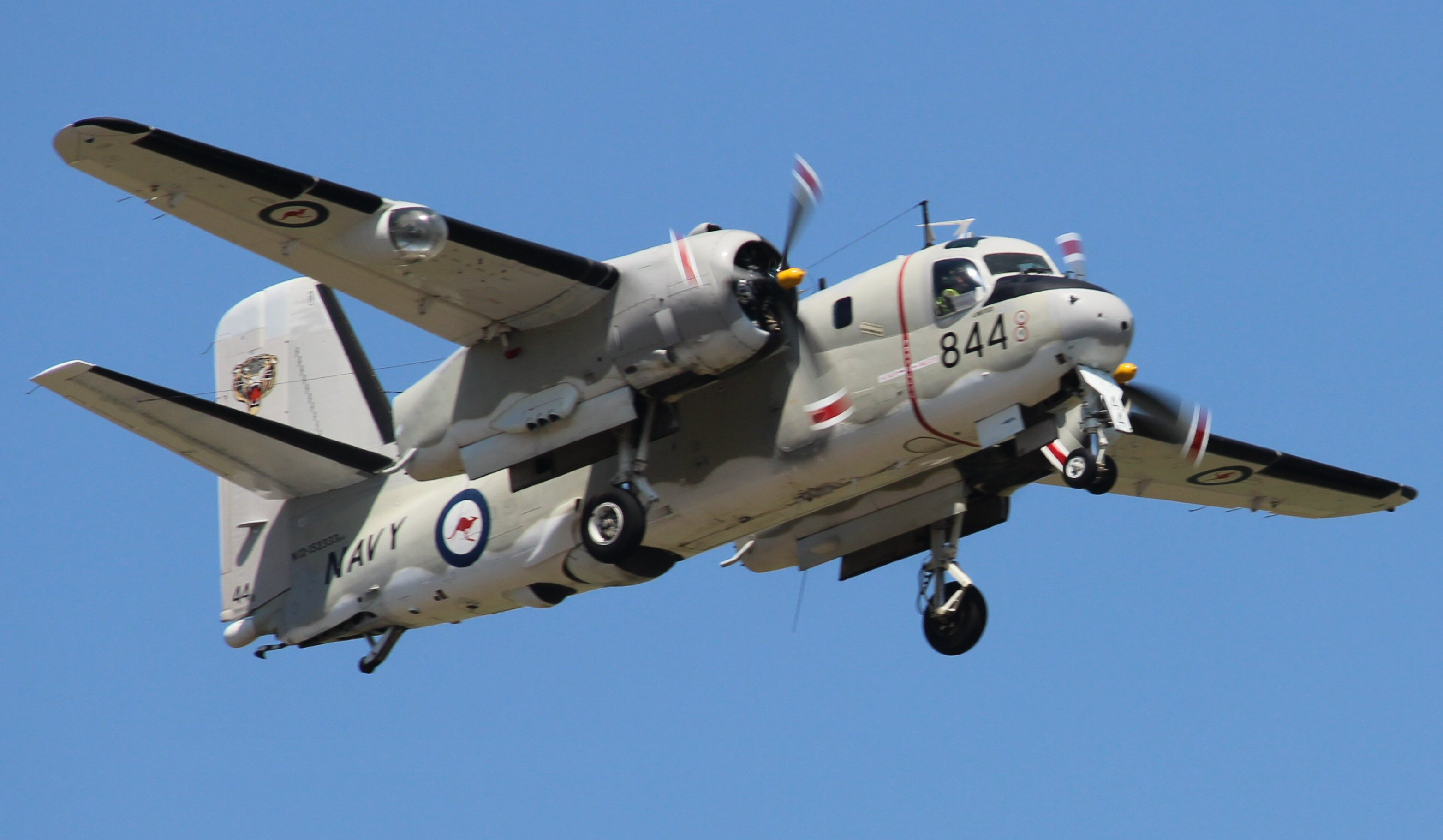
Grumman S-2G Tracker 844 in flight at the Tracker re-union at HARS, in October 2019

Airworthy

- S-2G VH-NVX painted as N12-152833 (844), ex USN BuNo 152333, of the Royal Australian Navy and formerly operated by the Navy Heritage Flight, since transferred with all RANHF assets to HARS Aviation Museum and returned to flight 14 September 2019

On display

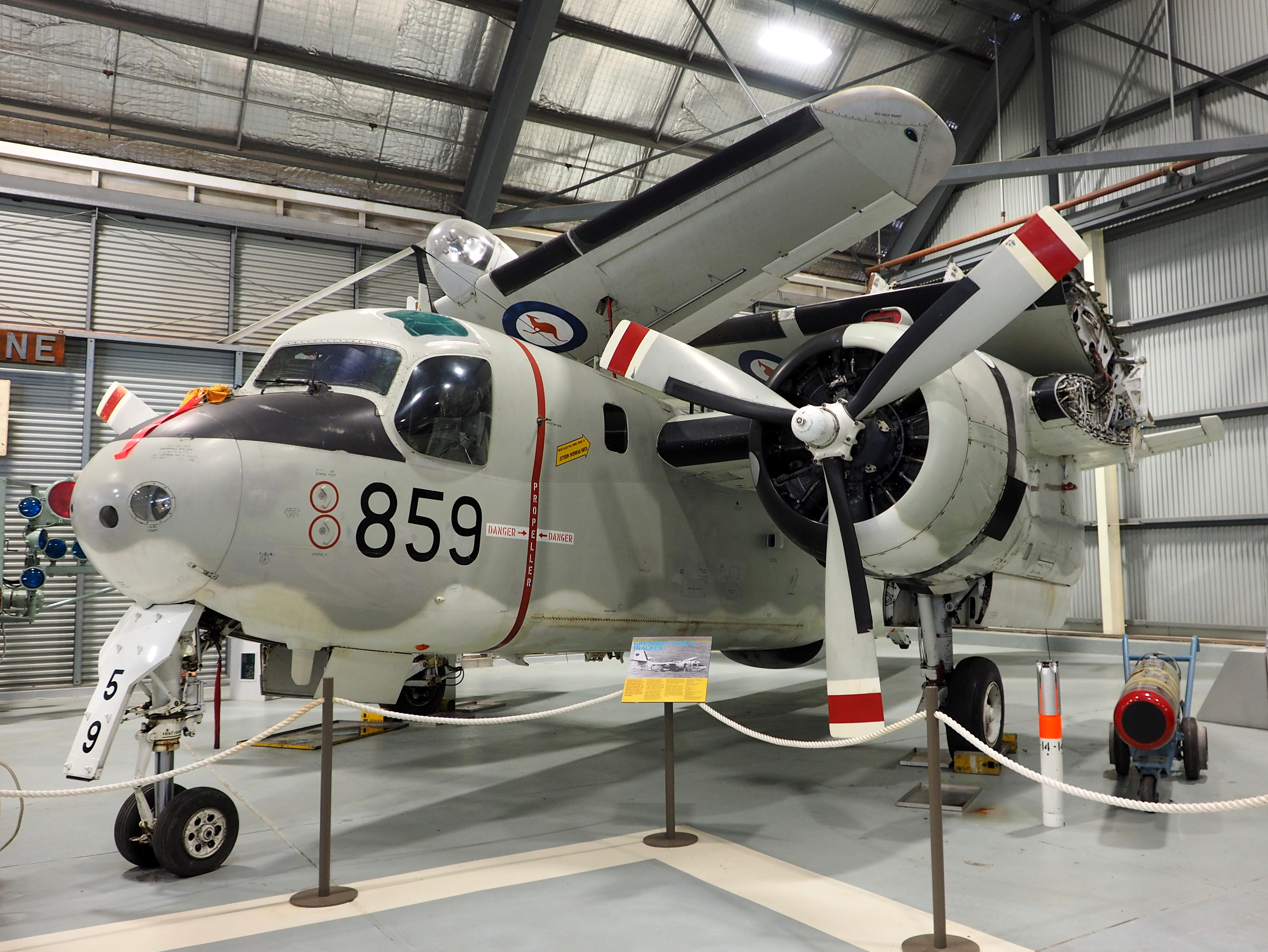
S-2G Tracker 153582 on display in 2015

- S-2A Tracker BuNo 133160 – Queensland Air Museum, Caloundra Airport, Caloundra West, Queensland, Australia
- S-2G Tracker N12-152812 (851), ex BuNo 152812 – HARS Aviation Museum, Albion Park, New South Wales
- S-2G Tracker N12-153582 (859), ex BuNo 153582 – Fleet Air Arm Museum, HMAS Albatross, Nowra, New South Wales, Australia
- S-2G Tracker N12-153566 (854), ex BuNo 153566, was on loan to Gippsland Armed Forces Museum, West Sale Airport, Sale, Victoria, Australia until June 2016.
- S-2E Tracker N12-153600 (845), ex BuNo 153600 – HARS Aviation Museum, Albion Park, New South Wales, Australia
- S-2E Tracker N12-153597 (842), ex BuNo 153597 – HARS Aviation Museum, Albion Park, New South Wales, Australia, formerly privately owned in outside storage near HMAS Albatross. To be restored to external completeness, repainted and possibly to be used as a gate guard outside the new HARS facility to be built at HMAS Albatross.
- S-2G Tracker N12-153567 (855), ex BuNo 153567, National Vietnam Veterans Museum, Phillip Island, Victoria

=== Brazil ===
- One S-2A Tracker and one S-2E Tracker, on display at the Brazilian Air Force Aerospace Museum, Rio de Janeiro, Brazil.

=== Canada ===
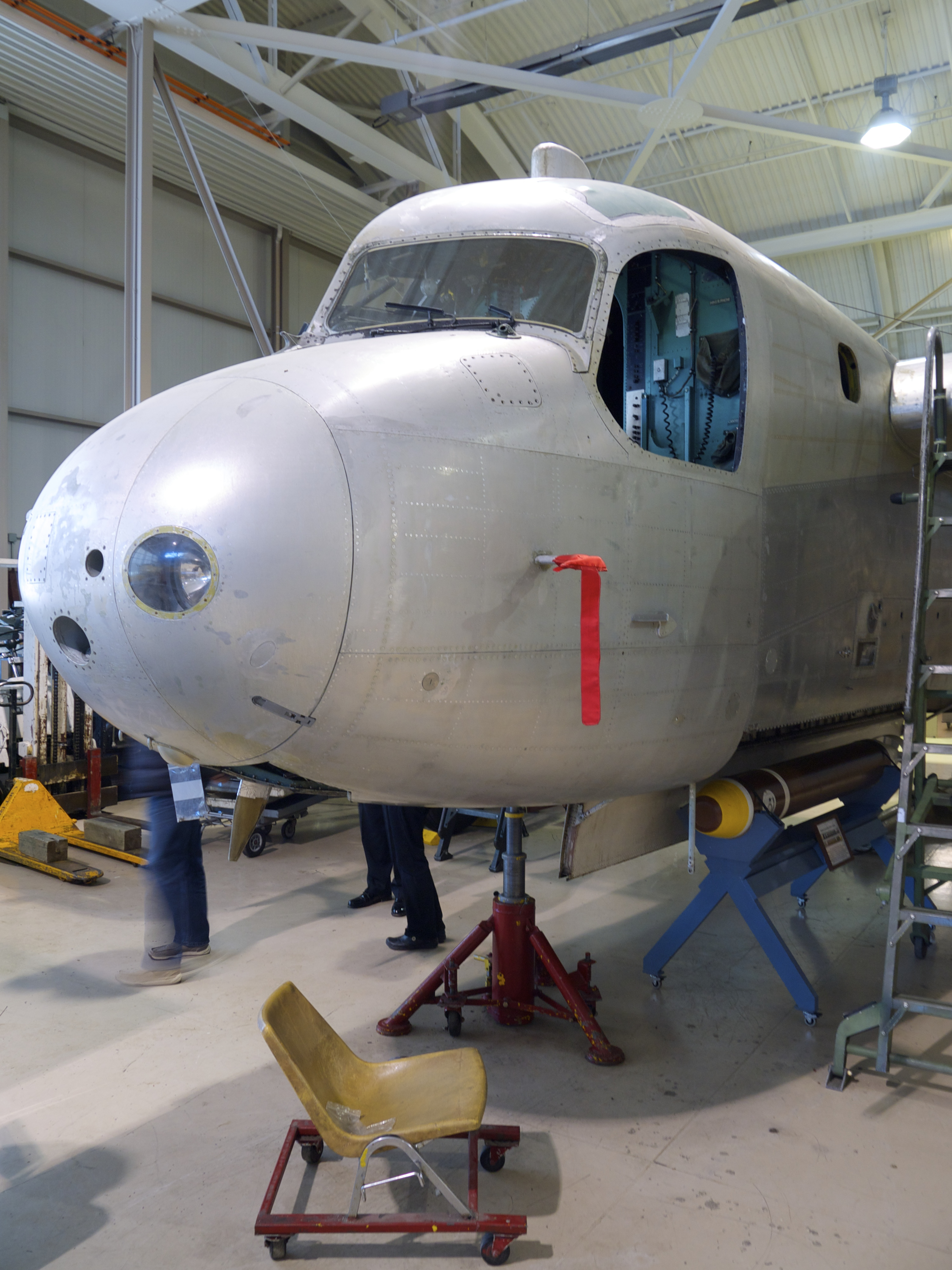
CS2F-2 Tracker 1577 at the Canadian Warplane Heritage Museum, Hamilton, Ontario

- CS2F-1 Tracker 1501 at the Shearwater Aviation Museum, Halifax, Nova Scotia
- CS2F-2 Tracker 1507 at the Base Borden Military Museum, CFB Borden, Barrie, Ontario
- CS2F-2 Tracker 1545 at the National Air Force Museum of Canada, Trenton, Ontario
- CS2F-2 Tracker 1577 at the Canadian Warplane Heritage Museum, Hamilton, Ontario (undergoing restoration to flying status)
- CS2F-2 Tracker 1598 at the Saskatchewan Aviation Museum, Saskatoon, Saskatchewan
- CS2F-2 Tracker 1600 – Canadian Air and Space Museum, Toronto, Ontario
- CP-121 Tracker 12131 – Slemon Park, former CFB Summerside, Summerside, Prince Edward Island.
- CP-121 Tracker 12157 – Shearwater Aviation Museum, Halifax, Nova Scotia.
- CP-121 Tracker 12176 – Atlantic Canada Aviation Museum, Halifax International Airport, Nova Scotia
- CP-121 Tracker 12187 – Canada Aviation and Space Museum, Ottawa, Ontario
- CP-121 Tracker 12188 – Comox Air Force Museum, Comox, British Columbia
- Conair Firecat (conversion from CS2L Tracker), Canadian Bushplane Heritage Centre, Sault Ste. Marie, Ontario
- Conair Firecat (conversion from CS2F-2 Tracker), registration CF-OPU, Canadian Museum of Flight, Langley, British Columbia

=== Italy ===
- CS2F-1 Tracker MM136556, Italian Air Force Museum, Vigna di Valle, Italy

=== Japan ===
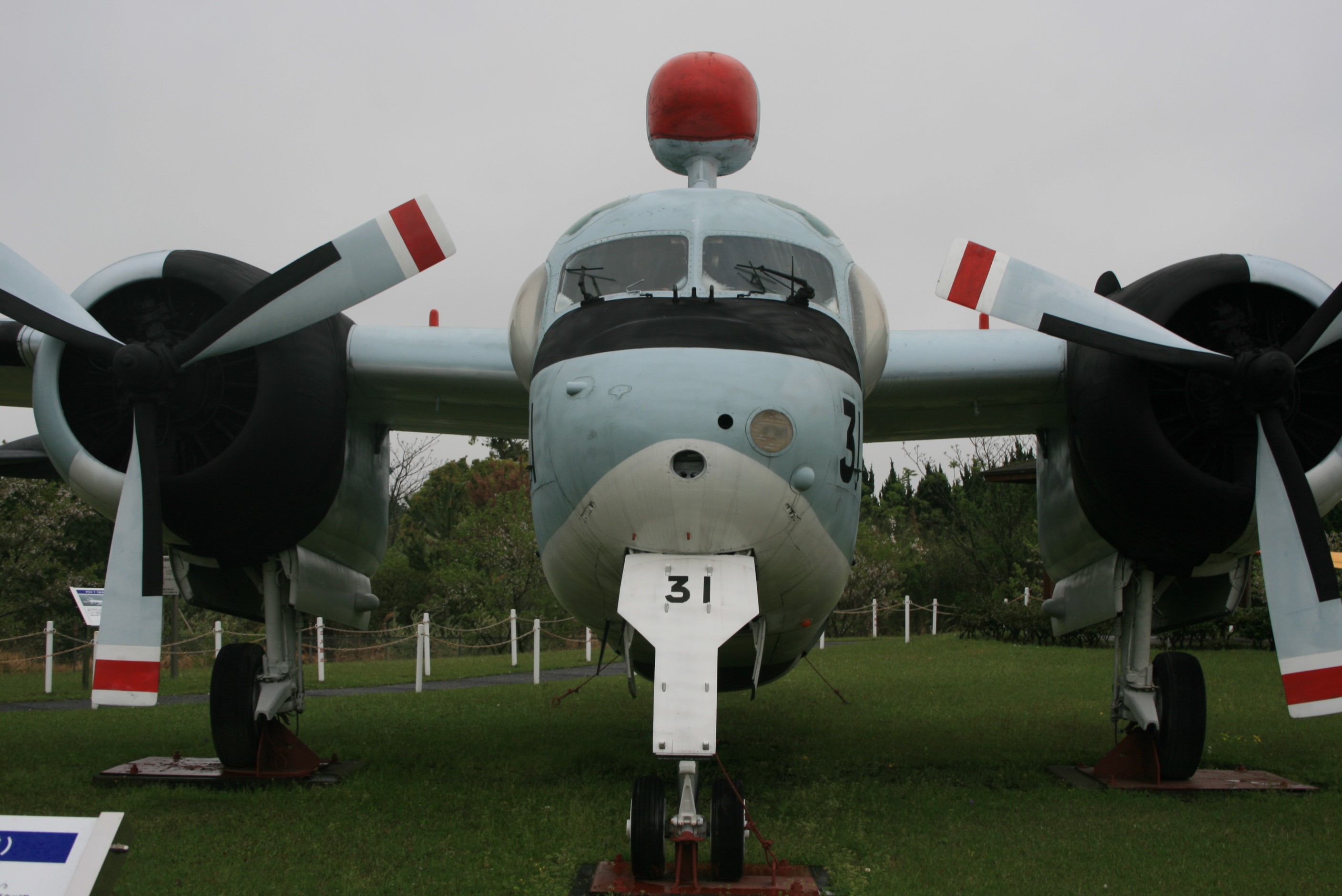
S2F-1 at Kanoya Air Field, Kanoya, Kagoshima

- S2F-1 4131 On display at Kanoya Naval Air base Museum at Kanoya Air Field, Kanoya, Kagoshima, Japan
- S2F-1 4150 At Tokushima Air Base, Matsushige Tokushima Prefecture
- S2F (US Navy) forward section on display at Kawaguchiko Motor Museum, Narusawa, Yamanashi prefecture

=== Netherlands ===
- US-2N Tracker 160, on display at the Nationaal Militair Museum, Soesterberg
- (C)S-2A Tracker 184, on display at Maritiem Vliegkamp De Kooy, Den Helder

=== South Korea ===
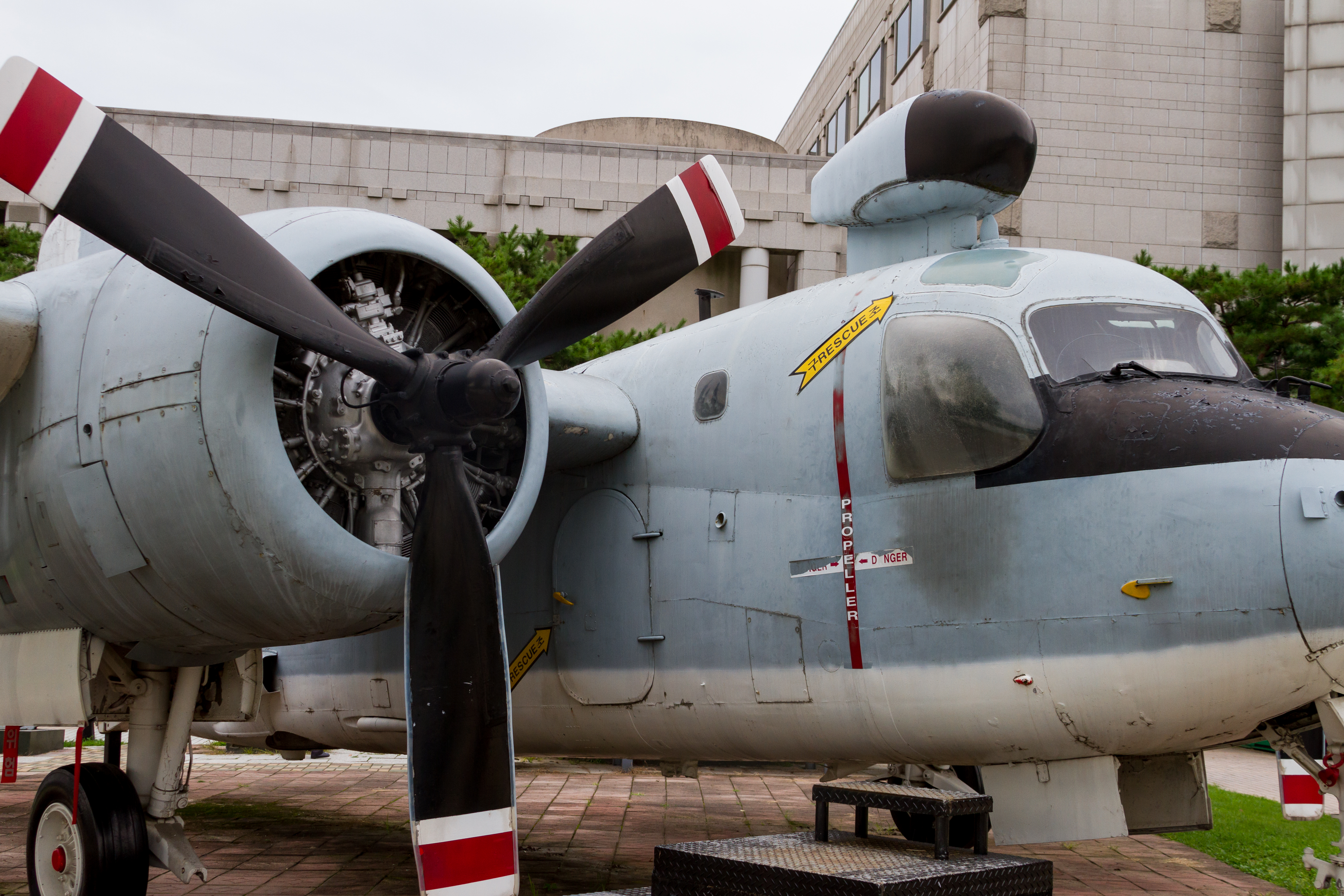
An S-2 Tracker on display at the War Memorial of Korea

- S-2 Tracker, on display at Daejeon National Cemetery
- S-2 Tracker, on display at Jeju International Airport, Jeju Island
- S2 Tracker, on display at Jinhae Naval Base, Jinhae
- S-2 Tracker, on display at the War Memorial of Korea, Seoul

=== Turkey ===
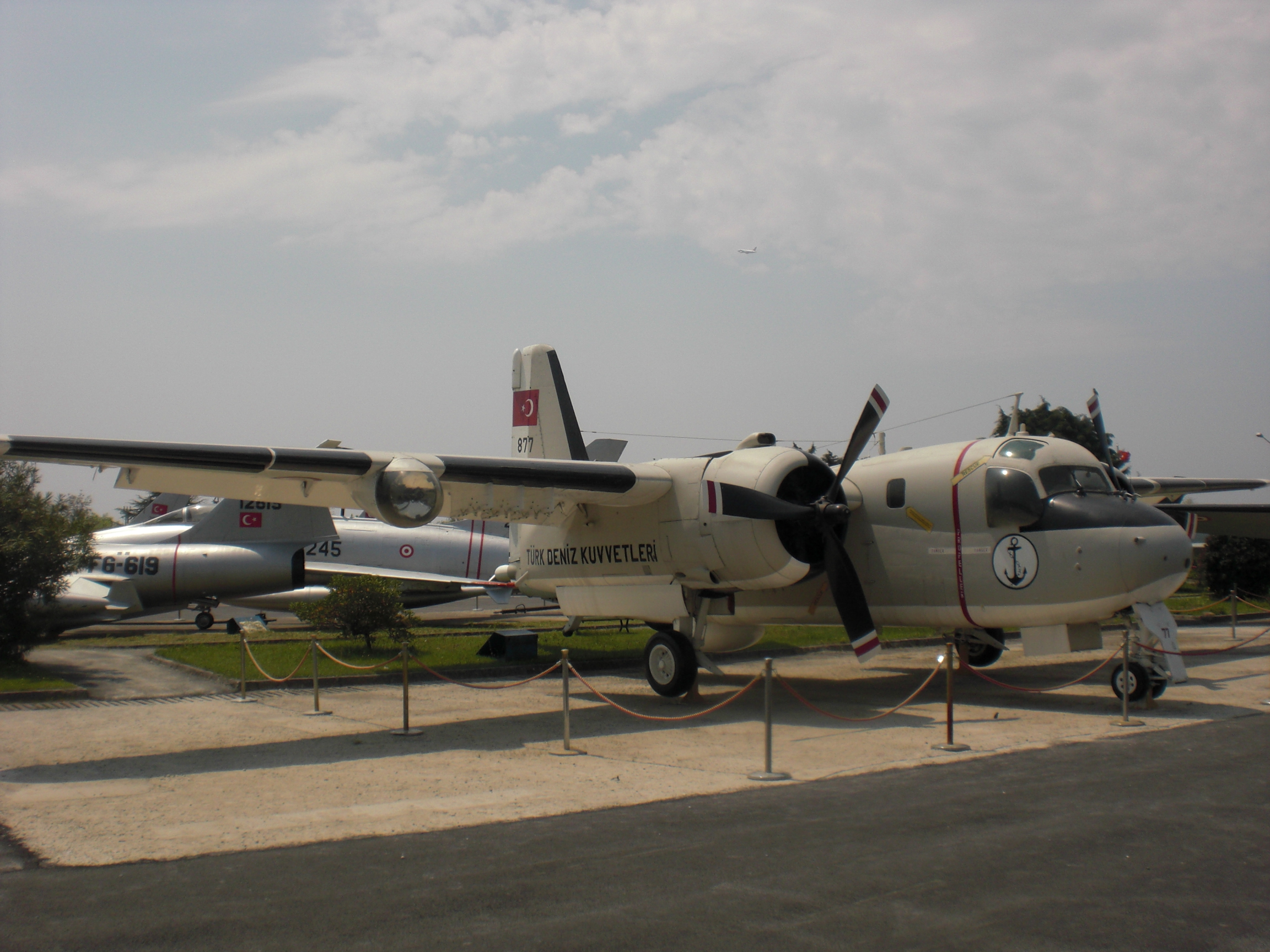
TCB-877, at the Istanbul Aviation Museum.

- Ex-USN BuNo 149877/TCB-877, S-2E, on display at the Istanbul Aviation Museum.

=== United States ===
==== S2F-1 (S-2A) ====
- BuNo 133179 – Mid America Air Museum, Liberal, Kansas.
- BuNo 133224 – Former US Navy S-2A, former California Division of Forestry (CDF) Tanker 84, displayed at the Pacific Coast Air Museum, Santa Rosa, California.
- BuNo 133251 – Former CDF Tanker 78 Aerospace Museum of California, North Highlands, California
- BuNo 136433 – Valiant Air Command Museum, Titusville, Florida
- BuNo 136468 – Pima Air Museum, adjacent to Davis-Monthan Air Force Base in Tucson, Arizona.
- BuNo 136546 – Weed Airport, Weed, California.
- BuNo 136560 – Southern Museum of Flight, Birmingham, Alabama.
- BuNo 136567 – Former CDF Tanker 74 Estrella Warbird Museum, Paso Robles, California.
- BuNo 136719 – Legacy Flight Museum, Rexburg, Idaho.

==== US-2A ====
- BuNo 136421 – Castle Air Museum at the former Castle Air Force Base in Atwater, CA.
- BuNo 136486 – Combat Air Museum at Topeka Regional Airport / Forbes Field and adjacent to Forbes Air National Guard Base (former Forbes Air Force Base) in Topeka, Kansas.
- BuNo 144721 – Selfridge Military Air Museum at Selfridge Air National Guard Base (former Selfridge Air Force Base), Harrison Township, Michigan.

==== US-2B ====
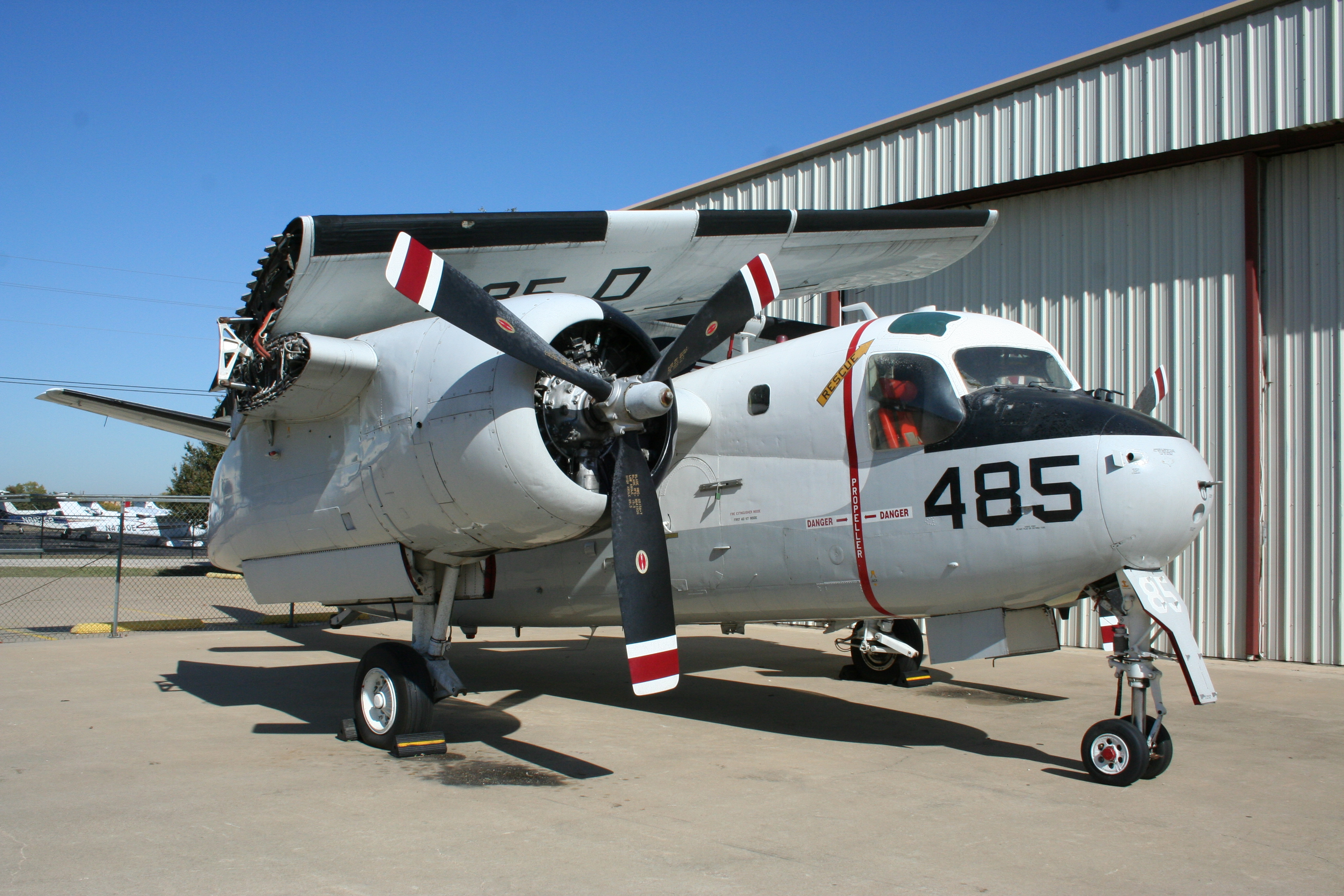
US-2B at the Cavanaugh Flight Museum

- BuNo 136431 – Cavanaugh Flight Museum, Addison, Texas. Removed from public display when the museum indefinitely closed on 1 January 2024. To be moved to North Texas Regional Airport in Denison, Texas.
- BuNo 136433 – Valiant Air Command Warbird Museum at Space Coast Regional Airport in Titusville, Florida.
- BuNo 136534 – Kissimmee Air Museum at Kissimmee Gateway Airport in Kissimmee, Florida.
- BuNo 136691 – USS Hornet Museum at the former Naval Air Station Alameda in Alameda, California.

==== S2F-3 (S-2D) ====
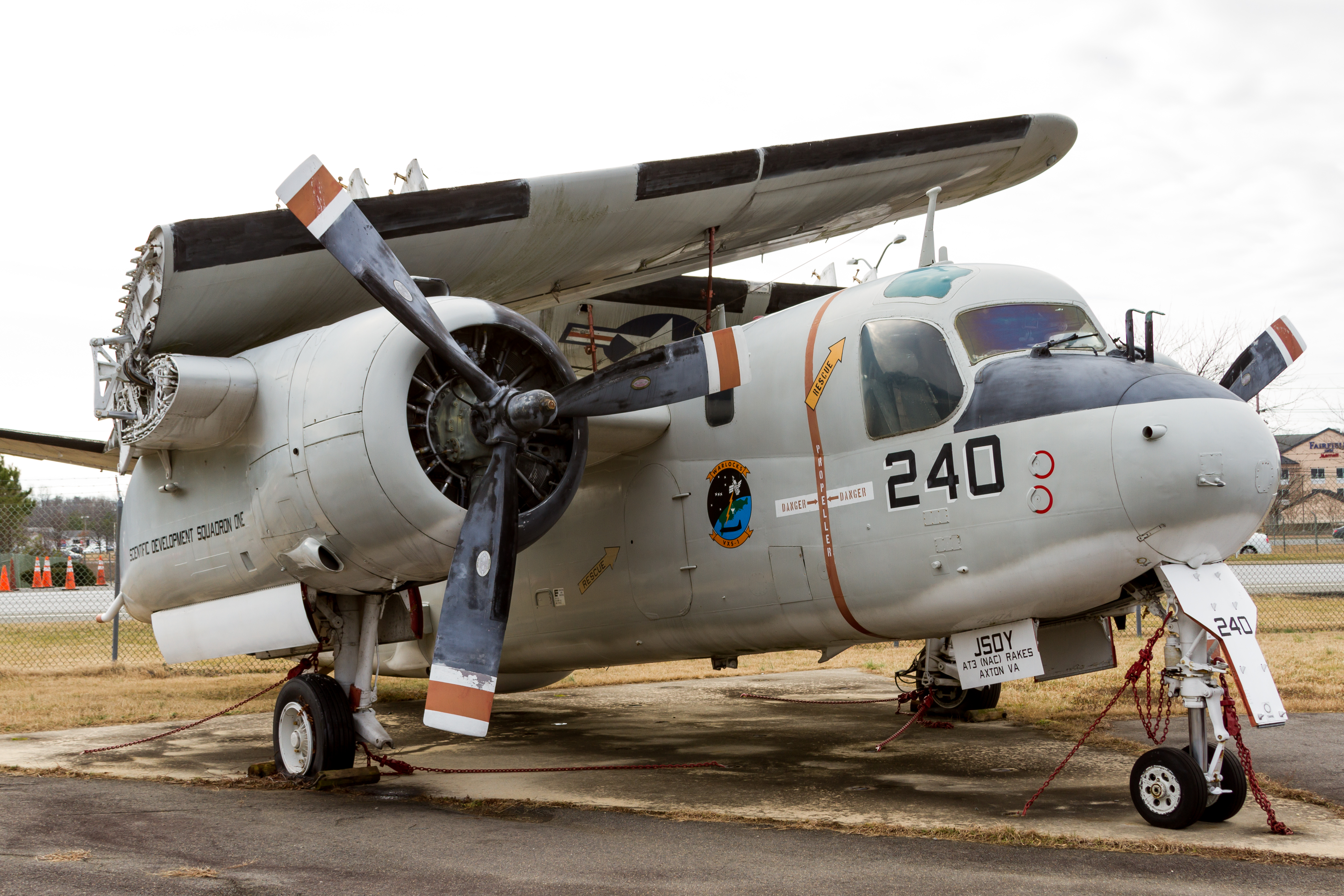
S-2D Tracker at the Patuxent River Naval Air Museum

- BuNo 147870 – Marine Corps Base Hawaii, Kaneohe, Hawaii.
- BuNo 148730 – NAS Jacksonville Heritage Park, Naval Air Station Jacksonville, Florida.
- BuNo 149240 – Patuxent River Naval Air Museum adjacent to Naval Air Station Patuxent River in Lexington Park, Maryland.

==== S2F-3S (S-2E) ====
- BuNo 151647 – National Naval Aviation Museum, Naval Air Station Pensacola, Florida
- BuNo 151657 – USS Yorktown (CV-10) at the Patriots Point Naval & Maritime Museum in Charleston, South Carolina.
- BuNo 152337 – Grumman Greenhouse, an art installation outside of the Pennsylvania Academy of the Fine Arts in Philadelphia, Pennsylvania.

=== Uruguay ===
- S-2G Tracker A-856, ex BuNo 152376 – Colonel Jaime Meregalli Aeronautical Museum, Ciudad de la Costa, Canelones.
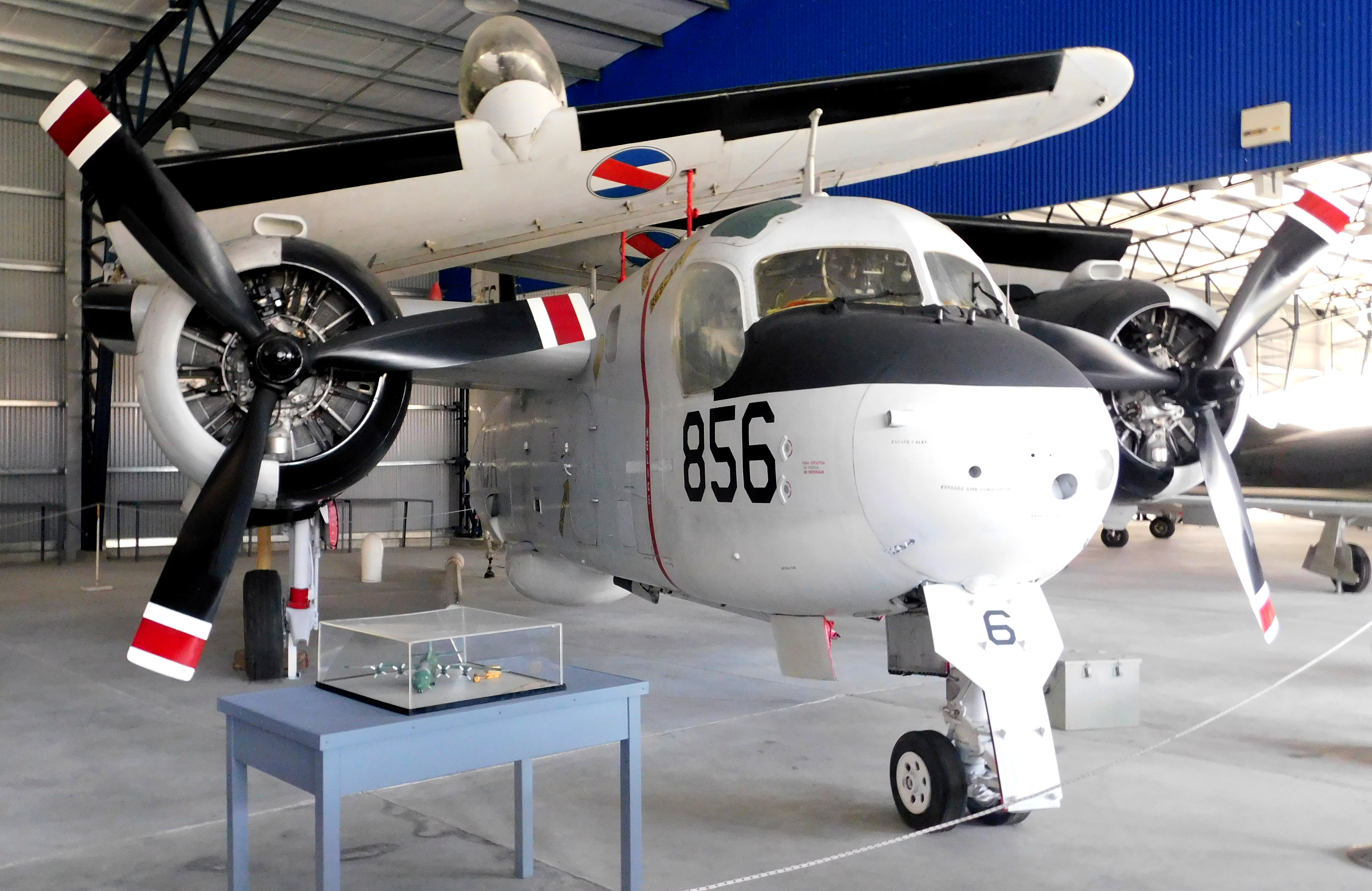
  Uruguayan Navy Grumman S-2G Tracker on display at the Colonel Jaime Meregalli Aeronautical Museum
