= BAC Jet Provost =

British jet trainer aircraft

Jet Provost
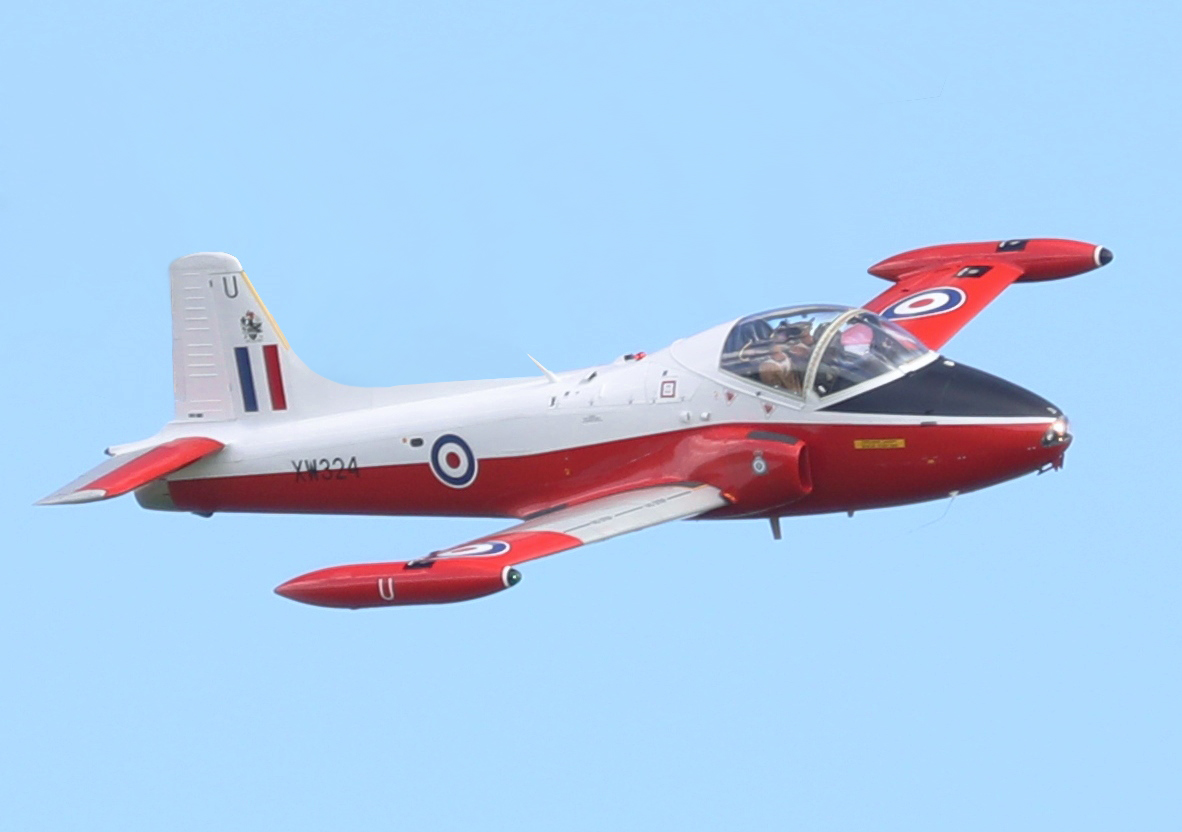
- Jet Provost T5

General information
- Type: Military trainer aircraft
- Manufacturer: Hunting Percival; British Aircraft Corporation
- Status: mostly retired, some examples flown privately
- Primary user: Royal Air Force
- Number built: 734

History
- Manufactured: 1958–1967
- Introduction date: 1955
- First flight: 26 June 1954
- Retired: 1993
- Developed from: Percival Provost
- Developed into: BAC Strikemaster

The BAC Jet Provost is a British jet trainer aircraft that was in use with the Royal Air Force (RAF) from 1955 to 1993. It was originally developed by Hunting Percival from the earlier piston engine-powered Percival Provost basic trainer, and later produced by the British Aircraft Corporation (BAC). In addition to the multiple RAF orders, the Jet Provost, sometimes with light armament, was exported to many air forces worldwide. The design was also further developed into a more heavily armed ground attack variant under the name BAC Strikemaster.

== Development ==
=== Origins ===
In early 1951, Hunting Percival began work on the design studies that would ultimately lead to the Jet Provost. At the time, the company was in the process of establishing mass production for the earlier piston-engined Percival Provost basic trainer, but had anticipated that demand for a jet-powered trainer aircraft would be on the horizon. The design team aimed to produce an aircraft capable of equalling the handling characteristics of operational jet fighters of the era while also possessing modest approach and stall speeds and remaining simple to handle, as opposed to aiming to obtain maximum performance.

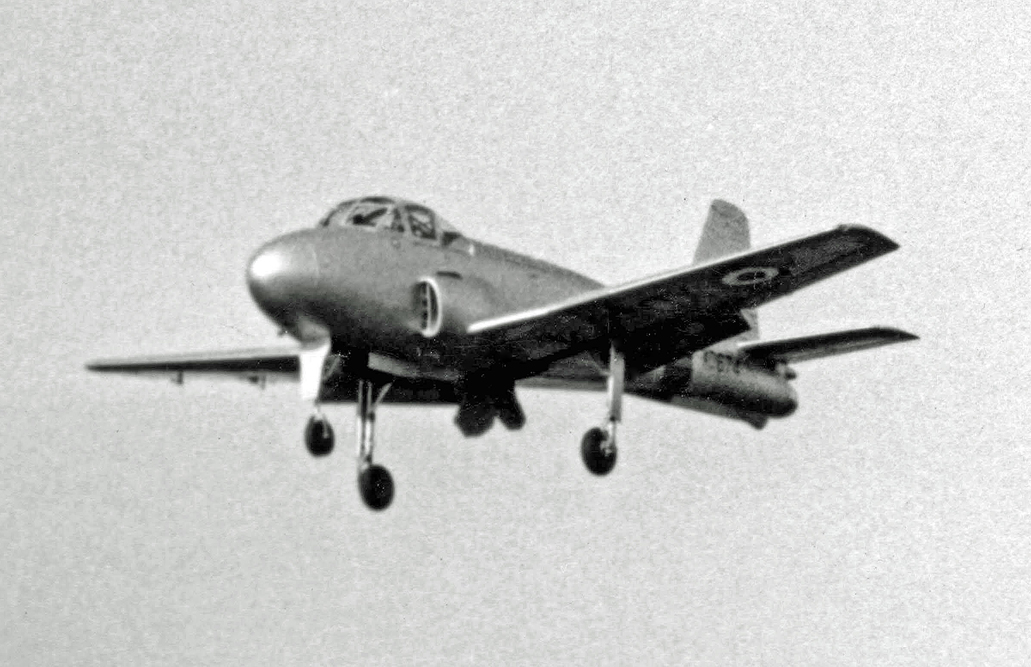
The prototype Jet Provost T.1 with the initial longer undercarriage at the Farnborough Air Show in 1954

During the early design process, a series of increasingly frequent liaisons with RAF Flying Training Command took place, helping to gauge the considerations required to succeed in aspects of the proposed aircraft's design, such as instructional processes and maintenance requirements. During development, Hunting Percival had intentionally reused as many existing components and subsystems of the Percival Provost as possible, including the tail surfaces, main planes and main undercarriage legs, to speed development through to the prototype stage. The initial design work was performed as a private venture, independent of any service requirement; in March 1953, sponsorship from the British Government to support the development was made available as a result of interest from the Ministry of Supply. That same month, an order for service-test quantity of Jet Provosts was received.

=== Prototypes and evaluation ===
On 26 June 1954, the prototype XD674 conducted its maiden flight from the factory at Luton Airport, flown by Dick Wheldon. A series of seven flights were flown in quick succession over the following three days. By early November 1954, a total of 123 flying hours had been accumulated by the prototype during Hunting Percival's own flight test program, after which the prototype was submitted for official trials at RAF Boscombe Down. While testing proved the overall performance of the Jet Provost to be satisfactory, refinements were made, such as shortening the legs of the landing gear for a smoother ride when deployed at semi-prepared airstrips.

On 19 February 1955, the first of ten pre-production aircraft, designated as the Jet Provost T1, performed its first flight. In May 1955, three of the pre-production aircraft were assigned for the first stage of service trials with the Central Flying School (CFS) of the RAF to determine the value of the Jet Provost in the ab initio training role and to develop a syllabus for the training program. During the second stage of CFS trials using the same three aircraft, actual students were introduced to the type for practical evaluation purposes, which was performed at RAF Hullavington until the successful completion of trials on 2 July 1956. According to feedback from CFS examiners, the Jet Provost had noticeably improved the performance of students during its trial deployment.

=== Further development ===
As a result of the results and responses produced from the trials performed using the pre-production aircraft, Hunting Percival proceeded to develop and incorporate several different improvements upon the design. Amongst the changes made was an overall smoothing of the fuselage lines, hydraulic systems being substituted for pneumatic counterparts, and the addition of a dorsal fillet; the new model was designated as the Jet Provost T2. On 1 September 1955, the first Jet Provost T2 made its first flight. This variant was used only for development work; in addition to seeing use at Hullavington, three Jet Provost T2s were dispatched overseas for winterisation trials in Scandinavia and a series of sales tours across Europe, Canada, the United States of America, and Latin America.

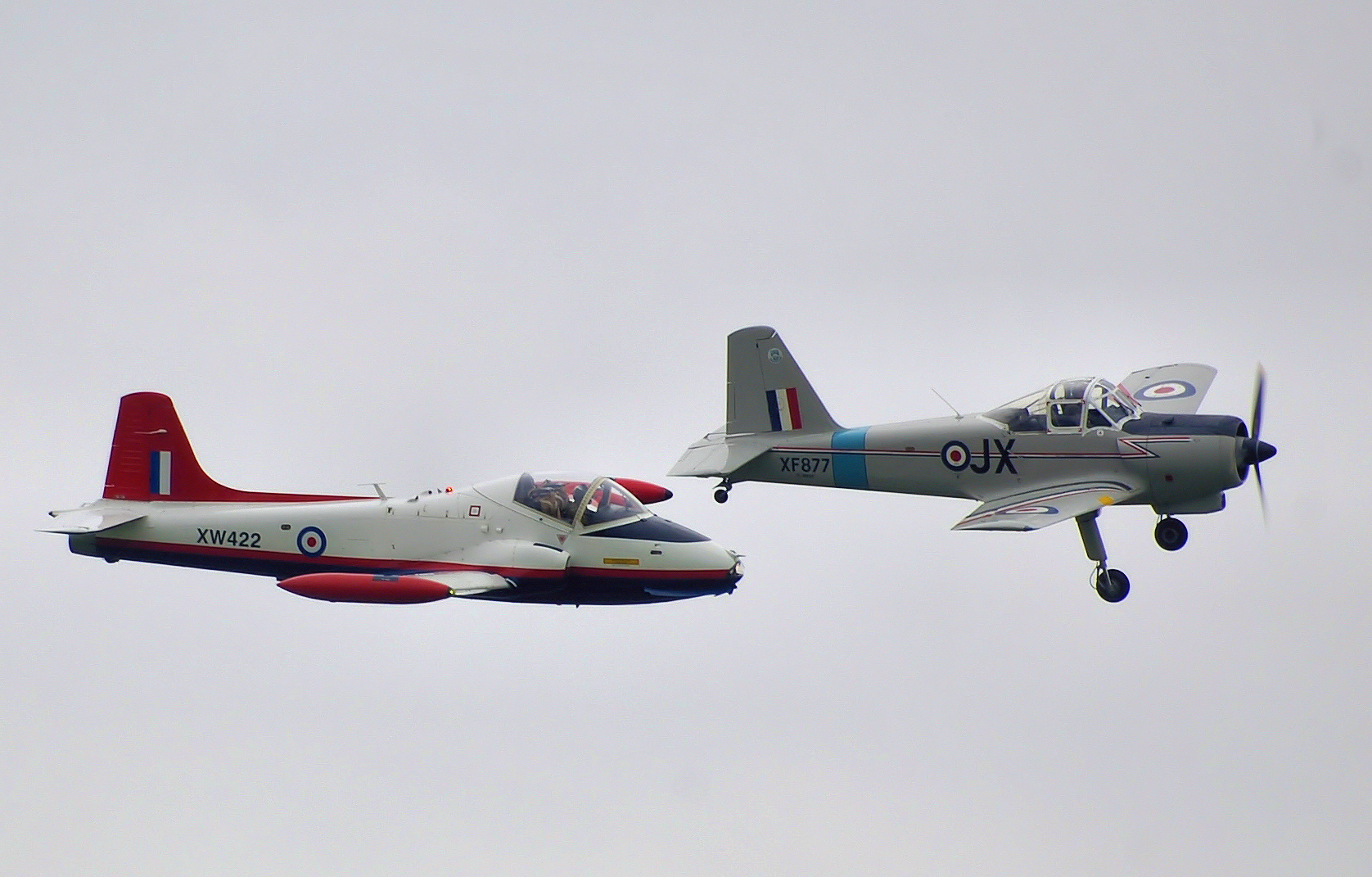
Preserved BAC Jet Provost T5a in formation with a Percival Provost T1

In June 1957, a production order was placed for the first 40 of the developed Jet Provost T3, featuring a more powerful Armstrong Siddeley Viper jet engine, ejector seats, a redesign of the airframe, and a shortened and strengthened version of the retractable tricycle undercarriage. Percival built a single example, which was used purely for structural tests throughout the development stages, giving the designers valuable research into what could be achieved with the basic design. On 22 June 1958, the first Jet Provost T.3 conducted its first flight. In total, 201 T3s were delivered between 1958 and 1962.

The T4 followed in 1960, fitted with a more powerful variant of the Viper engine and first flown on 15 July, and this was followed by the pressurised T5 in 1967. The T51 was an armed export version, sold to Ceylon (present day Sri Lanka), Kuwait and Sudan. It was armed with two 7.7-mm (0.303-inch) machine guns. The T52 was another export version sold to Iraq, South Yemen, Sudan and Venezuela, with the same armament as the T51. The T55 was the final armed export version which was sold to Sudan. A more heavily armed variant of the airframe was developed as the BAC Strikemaster.

== Design ==
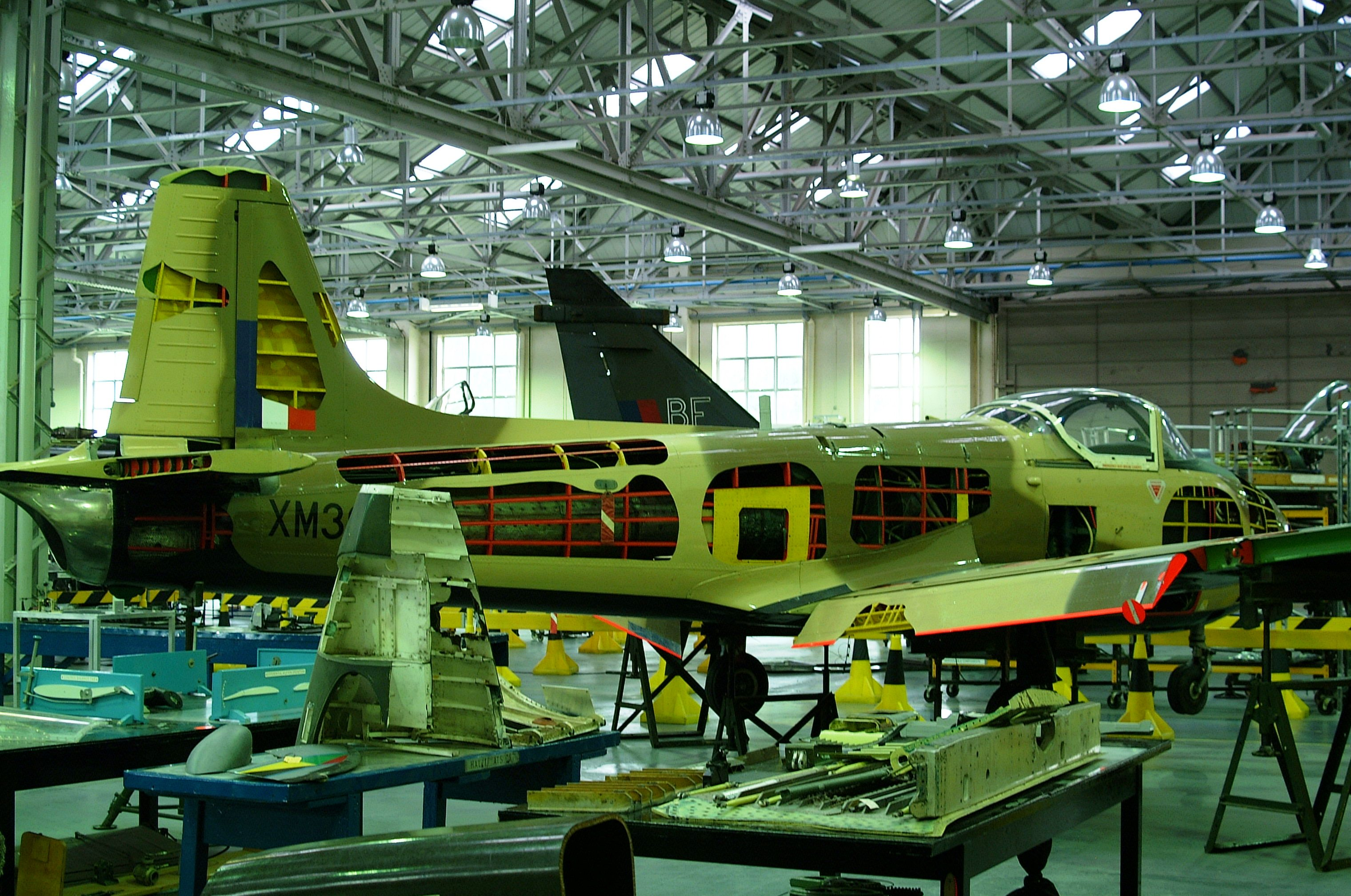
Jet Provost training frame with cutaway sections at RAF Cosford, 2004

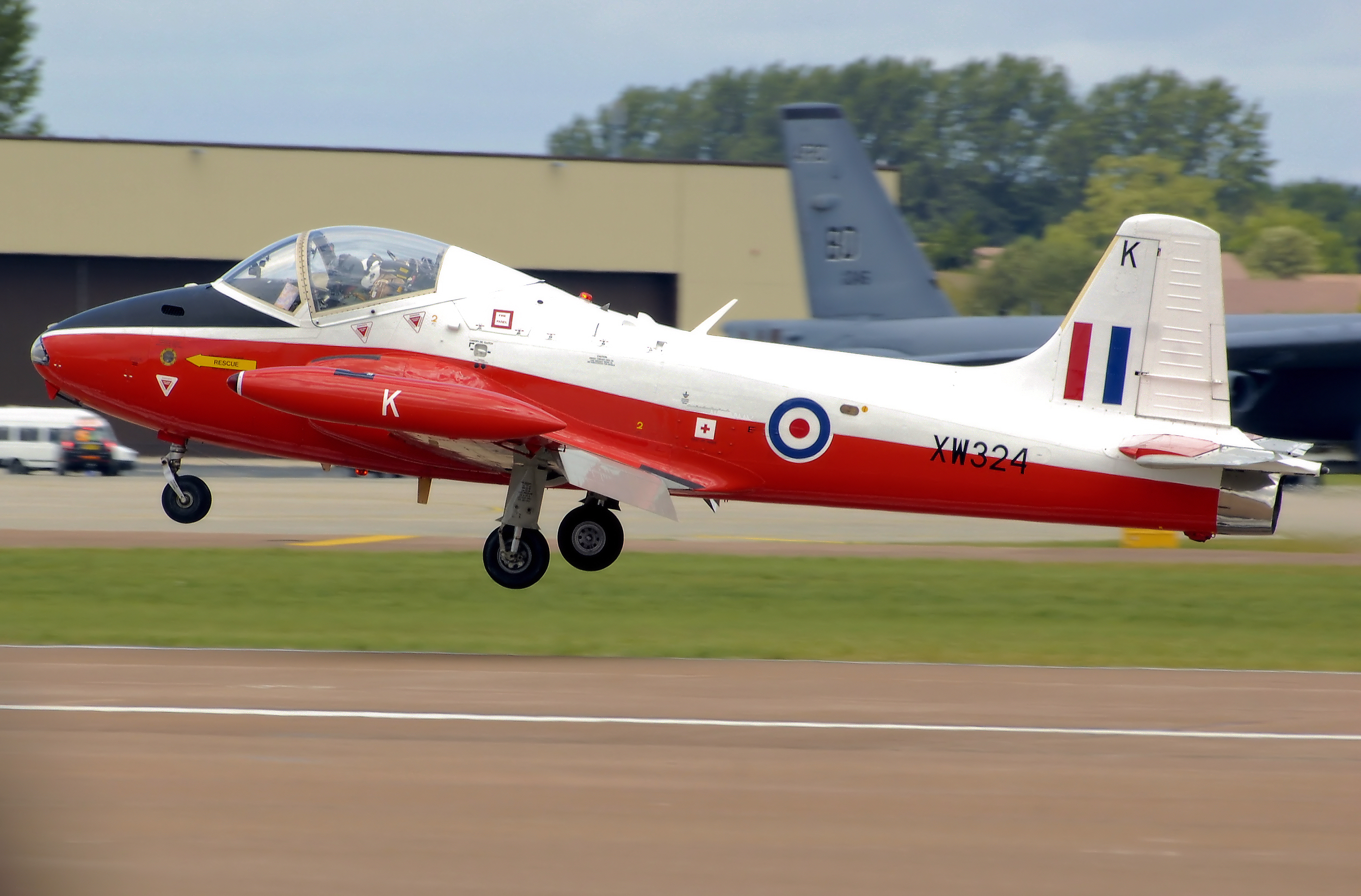
ex-RAF BAC Jet Provost T5 lands at RAF Fairford, England, in 2008

The BAC Jet Provost is a dedicated jet-powered trainer aircraft; according to aviation publication Flight International, it has the distinction of being the first ab initio jet trainer to be standardised by any air force. As designed, it was intended for the Jet Provost to replace, rather than accompany, the use of piston-engine trainer aircraft. The Jet Provost incorporates numerous features to support students during training. The aerodynamic design deliberately avoids speed, instead focusing on favourable handling characteristics and ease of recovery from stall and spin conditions. An emphasis was placed on flexibility, enabling use of the type throughout a range of training operations.

The cockpit of the Jet Provost, and much of the operational equipment fittings, is essentially identical to that of the preceding Percival Provost. It features a side-by-side seating arrangement, both positions being fitted with duplicated flight controls and instrumentation, which is well suited to the pupil-instructor pairing. The dual flight controls employs conventional manually-controlled flight control surfaces via a cable-and-tie rod arrangement. A key feature for the era amongst the fittings in the cockpit is the Centralised Warning Panel, which alerts the pilots in the event of a number of unfavourable or hazardous conditions being detected, such as icing conditions, fire, and oxygen failure. The high-flying capabilities of the Jet Provost necessitated the addition of an oxygen system in the cockpit, which was unpressurised on early production aircraft.

The Jet Provost has an uncomplicated structure, the airframe being based on the Percival Provost, albeit being strengthened in key areas such as the main wing spar and featuring a substantially different undercarriage arrangement. It possesses an all-metal stressed-skin fuselage built in two sections, the forward section stretching from the rear of the engine bay to the nose comprises a double-frame to absorb the wing and engine loads, while the rear fuselage section uses an orthodox semi-monocoque structure. Major loads across the fuselage are supported by a combination of four longerons and a single longitudinal beam across the upper-center line. The ailerons, elevators, and rudder are all attached to the airframe via two inset hinges each. The nose contains a hinged metal assembly, housing the radio, batteries, and other electronic equipment, and is easily serviceable by ground crew. All fuel tankage is housed within the wings. Where possible, all components used were designed to maximised interchangeability and to conform with international standardisation; a total of 49 service panels across the aircraft's exterior provides access for maintenance and servicing.

The Jet Provost is equipped with a single Armstrong Siddeley Viper 101 turbojet engine, which is mounted behind the cockpit in a roomy stainless steel-lined engine bay upon a secondary steel-tube structure. Air is fed to the engine by a pair of ram-air intakes set on either side of the aircraft's forward fuselage connected via sharply-curving ducts to converge just forward of the engine itself. As supplied, each engine is delivered as a compact engine-change unit, comprising the engine itself, accessories, and oil tank. Both the hydraulic and electrical systems were driven via a fuselage-mounted accessories gearbox connected to the Viper engine by a telescopic drive. One particularly favourable aspect of the Viper engine is the low maintenance demands imposed for the era. Engine ignition is achieved via an electric starter system, the engine controls have been described as being of a conventional nature.

== Operational service ==
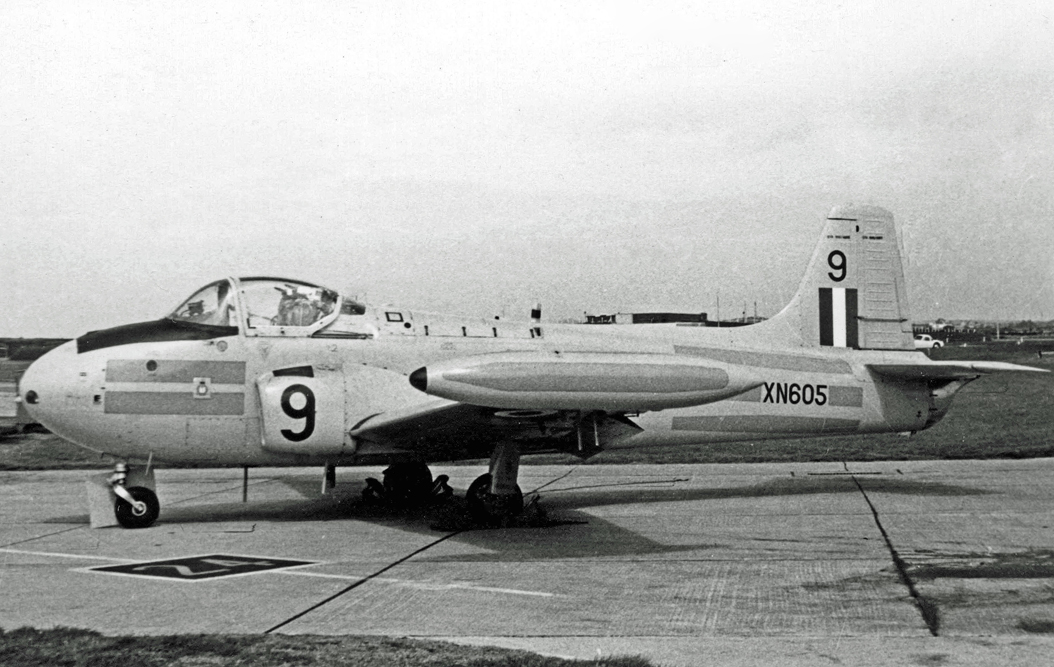
Operational Jet Provost T3 of No.6 Flying Training School, RAF, in 1967

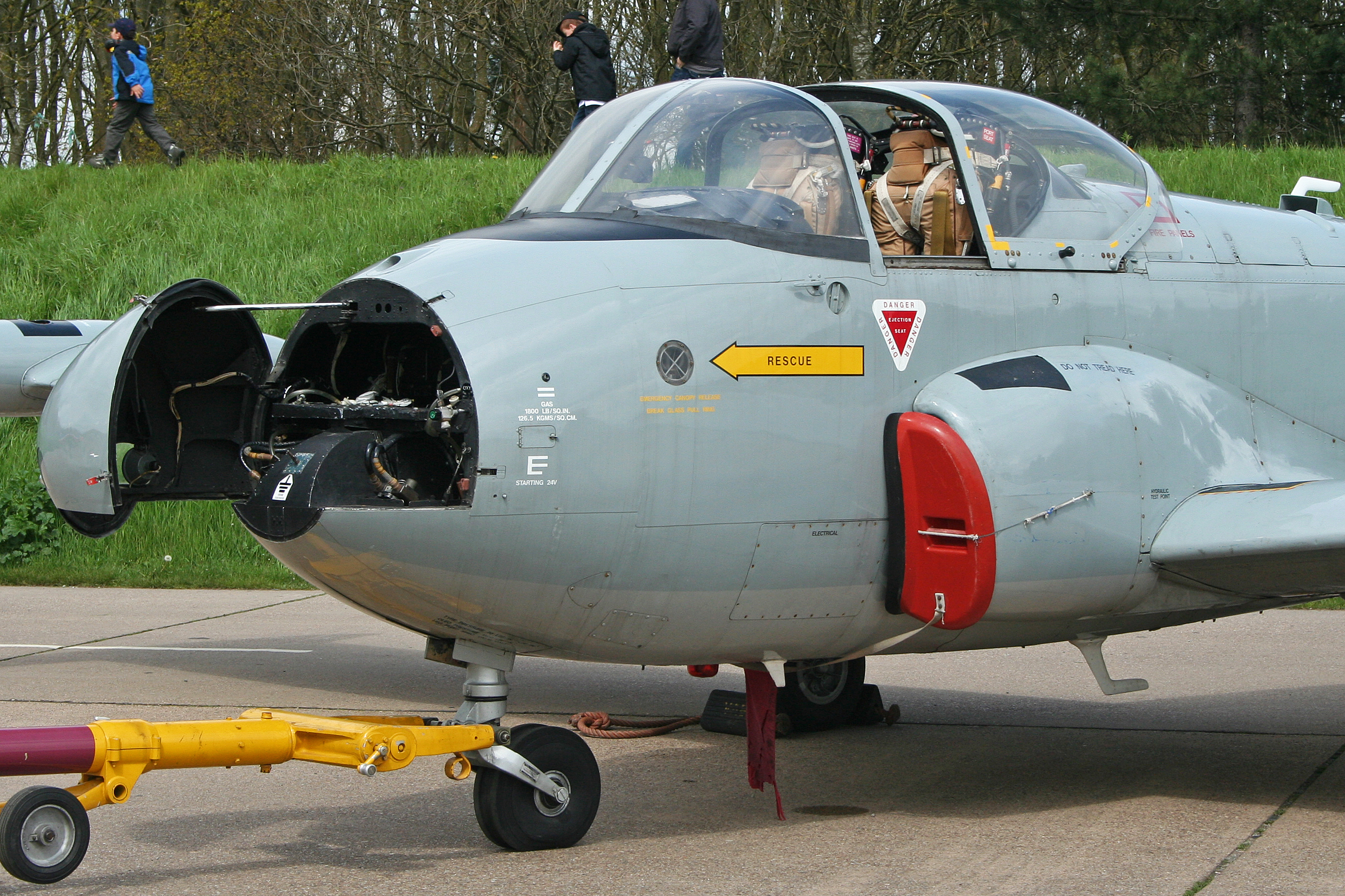
Open cockpit and nose cone of a Jet Provost T.3

The Jet Provost proved to be a capable trainer, being used in the ab initio Basic Trainer role from the outset. (Pilots progressed to the de Havilland Vampire and later the Folland Gnat for Advanced Jet Training).

After successful acceptance trials of the T1 during late 1955 at No. 2 Flying Training School at RAF Hullavington, the RAF formally accepted the type in 1957. The first production version was the T3, powered by the Viper 102, and this entered service with No. 2 FTS, located at RAF Syerston, during June 1959, when deliveries commenced from the Hunting Aircraft factory at Luton airport. The T3 was also operated by Central Flying School at RAF Little Rissington; the Royal Air Force College at RAF Cranwell, Lincolnshire; by No. 1 Flying Training School at RAF Linton-on-Ouse, Yorkshire; 3FTS at RAF Leeming, Yorkshire; 6FTS at RAF Acklington, Northumberland; and 7FTS at RAF Church Fenton, Yorkshire. The twin-seated side by side variant was also used at RAF Brawdy in Wales to train Forward Air Controllers.

The later T4 was fitted with the more powerful Viper A.S.V. 11 of 2,500 lbs static thrust and first flew on 15 July 1960. It quickly entered service with the units listed above.

The T5 variant was fitted with the Viper 201 and cockpit pressurisation. These developments encouraged the RAF to utilise the Jet Provost in a number of different roles besides basic training. With a top speed of 440 mph, excellent manoeuvrability, mechanical reliability and low operating costs, the Jet Provost was utilized as an aerobatic aircraft, air warfare and tactical weapons training as well as advanced training. The first T5 made its maiden flight on 28 February 1967 and deliveries from BAC's Warton factory commenced on 3 September 1969. Operators of the T5 included the RAF's Central Flying School and No. 1, No. 3 and No. 6 Flying Training Schools.

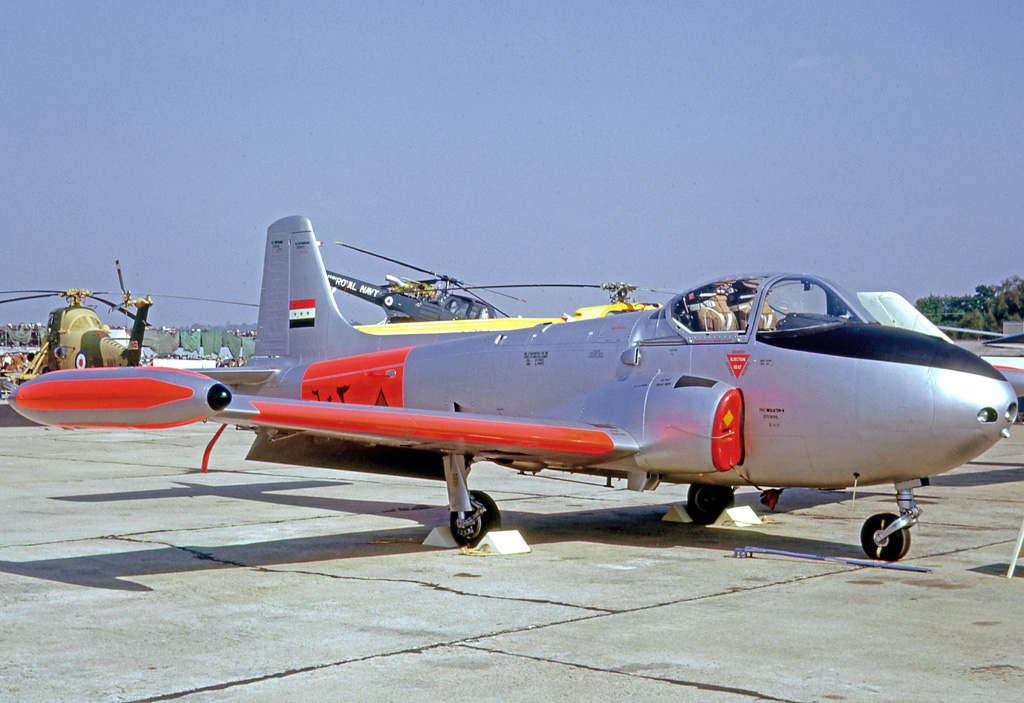
Jet Provost T52 of the Iraq Air Force at the Farnborough Air Show in 1964

Besides service with the RAF, the Jet Provost found success in export markets. A single Jet Provost T2 was exported to Australia and was operated by the Royal Australian Air Force (RAAF) to evaluate the type for the purpose of providing 'all-through' jet-based training. Following a six-month evaluation period, the RAAF ultimately decided to retain the de Havilland Vampire to fulfill its requirements for a jet-powered trainer, and later replaced its Vampires with the Italian-built Aermacchi MB-326 during the late 1960s instead. The sole aircraft itself was retained, being presented to the Sydney Technical College for use as an instructional airframe, and was later preserved.

Ceylon ordered twelve Jet Provost T51s, which went into operational service in early 1960. One crashed in February 1960 following a flame out. The Provosts were meant for pilot conversions for jets and intended as a stepping stone to introduce jet fighters to the Royal Ceylon Air Force (RCyAF). However these plans were scrapped due to defence cuts following the attempted coup in 1962 and by the late 1960s the remaining Provosts were mothballed. With the outbreak of the 1971 JVP insurrection in April 1971, the RCyAF took out its mothballed Provosts and started a crash program to bring these to operational readiness in three days. These Provost carried out ground attack sorties on insurgent targets, vectored in by helicopters that used smoke bombs to mark targets for Provosts. One Provost crashed returning from a sortie and its pilot was killed.

Nigeria acquired two ex-Sudan Air Force Jet Provost T.51s in 1967, using them for training and ground attack purposes against Biafra during the Nigerian Civil War. Flown both by Nigerian and mercenary pilots, they proved effective as in both roles, but efforts to obtain more Jet Provosts directly from Britain failed.

The Jet Provost was withdrawn from RAF service during the early 1990s, having been replaced by the newer turboprop-powered Short Tucano. Ab initio training had reverted to piston-engined aircraft in the early 1970s, using the Scottish Aviation Bulldog.

The Jet Provost remains popular among private operators and enthusiasts; being an inexpensive jet, many have been acquired and maintained in a flightworthy condition by collectors and private individuals. Some are flown at airshows, whilst roughly equal numbers are maintained in ground-runnable condition at various locations, many of these being in the United Kingdom.

== Variants ==
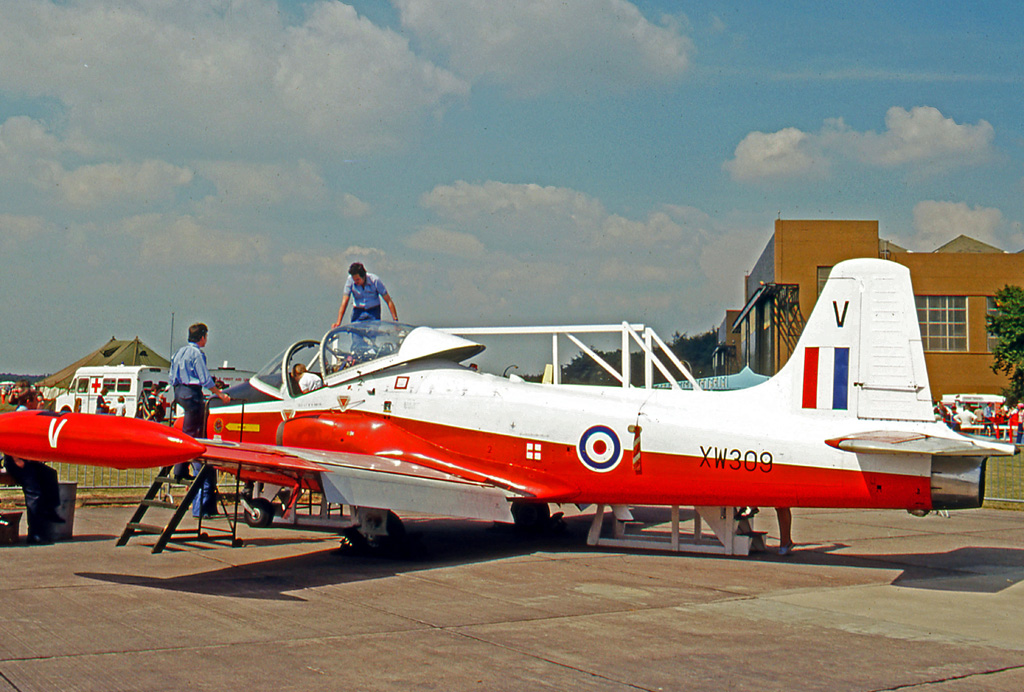
Operational Jet Provost T.5 of No.6 Flying Training School in 1977

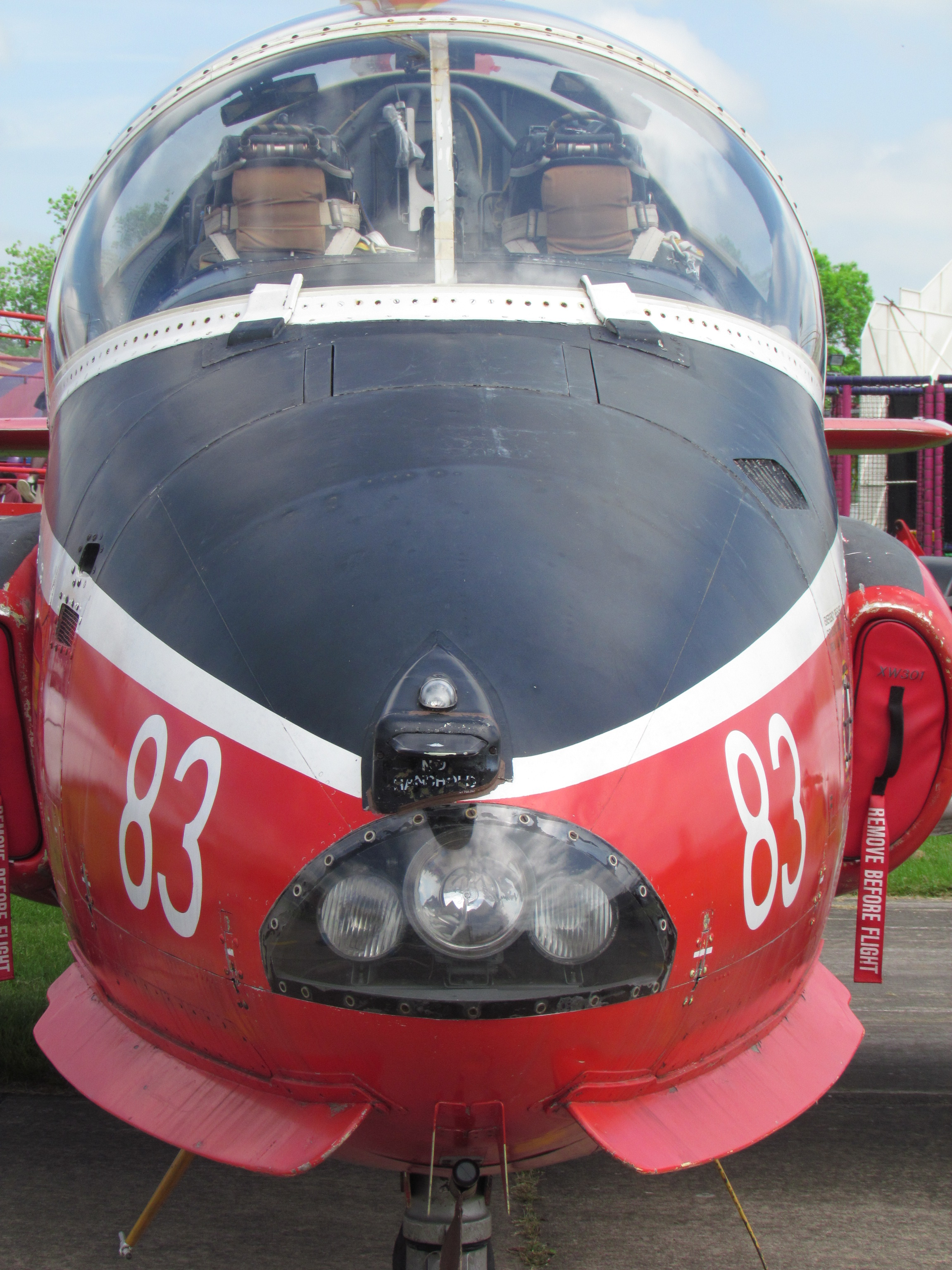
Head-on view of a BAC Jet Provost T.5

Model	Number built	Manufacturer	Comments
Jet Provost T1	12	Hunting Percival	Initial production batch for the RAF.
Jet Provost T2	3	Hunting Percival	Development aircraft only.
Jet Provost T2B	1	Hunting Percival	Company demonstrator. Evaluated in Portugal.
Jet Provost T3	201	Hunting Aircraft	Main production batch for the RAF.
Jet Provost T3A	(70)	Hunting	Modified T3 with improved avionics for the RAF.
Jet Provost T4	198	BAC	Variant with more powerful engine for the RAF.
Jet Provost T5	110	BAC	Pressurised version for the RAF.
Jet Provost T5A	(93)	BAC	Modified T5 with improved avionics and a rough grey coating on the wing to break up the smooth airflow and give the trainee pilot an early indication of the onset of a stall (the T5's original clean wing gave the pilot little warning).
(Jet Provost T5B)	(13)	BAC	Unofficial designation: a T5 fitted with tip-tanks used for Navigator training.
Jet Provost T51	22	Hunting Aircraft	Export version of the T3 (12 built for Ceylon, four built for Sudan, and six built for Kuwait).
Jet Provost T52	43	BAC	Export version of the T4 (20 built for Iraq, 15 built for Venezuela, eight built for Sudan).
Jet Provost T52A	?	BAC	Export version of the T4 (? built for South Yemen).
Jet Provost T55	5	BAC	Export version of the T5, built for Sudan.
BAC Strikemaster	146	BAC	Ground attack version of the T5.
BAC 166	1	BAC	Private venture trial variant of the T4 with a Viper 522 engine.

== Operators ==
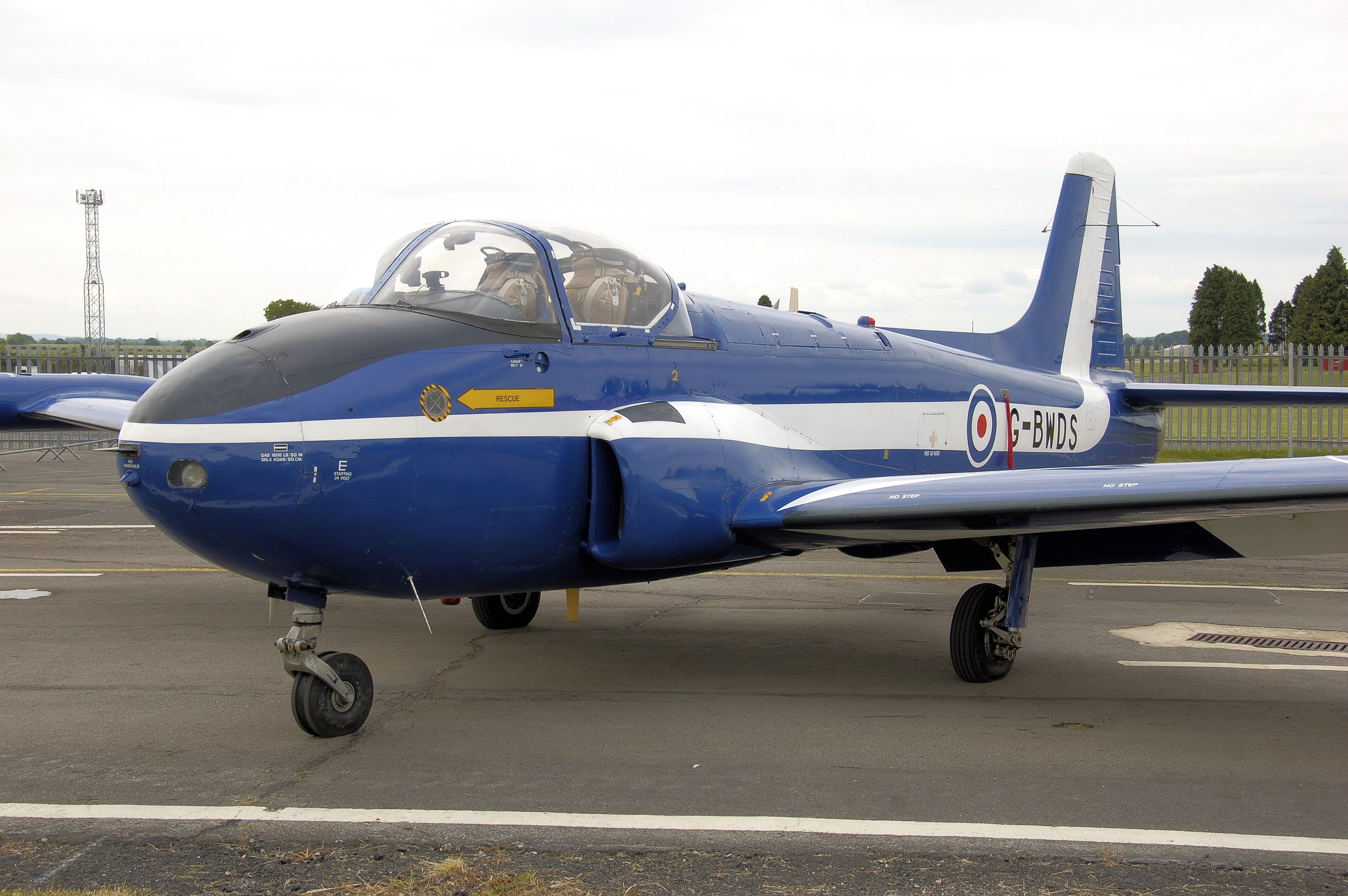
ex-RAF Jet Provost T3a on display at Kemble Air Day 2008, England

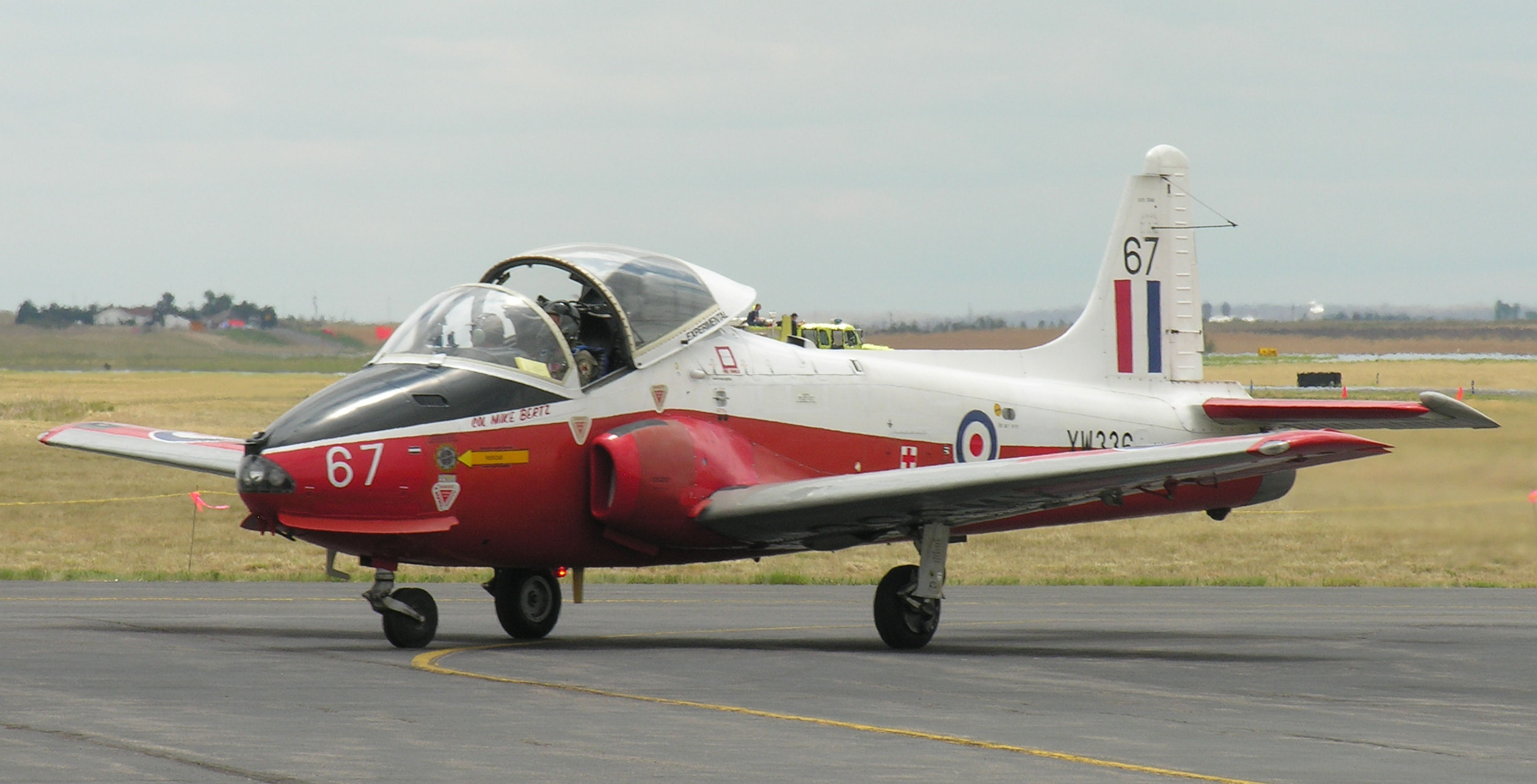
A BAC Jet Provost at Front Range Airport, Colorado, 2006

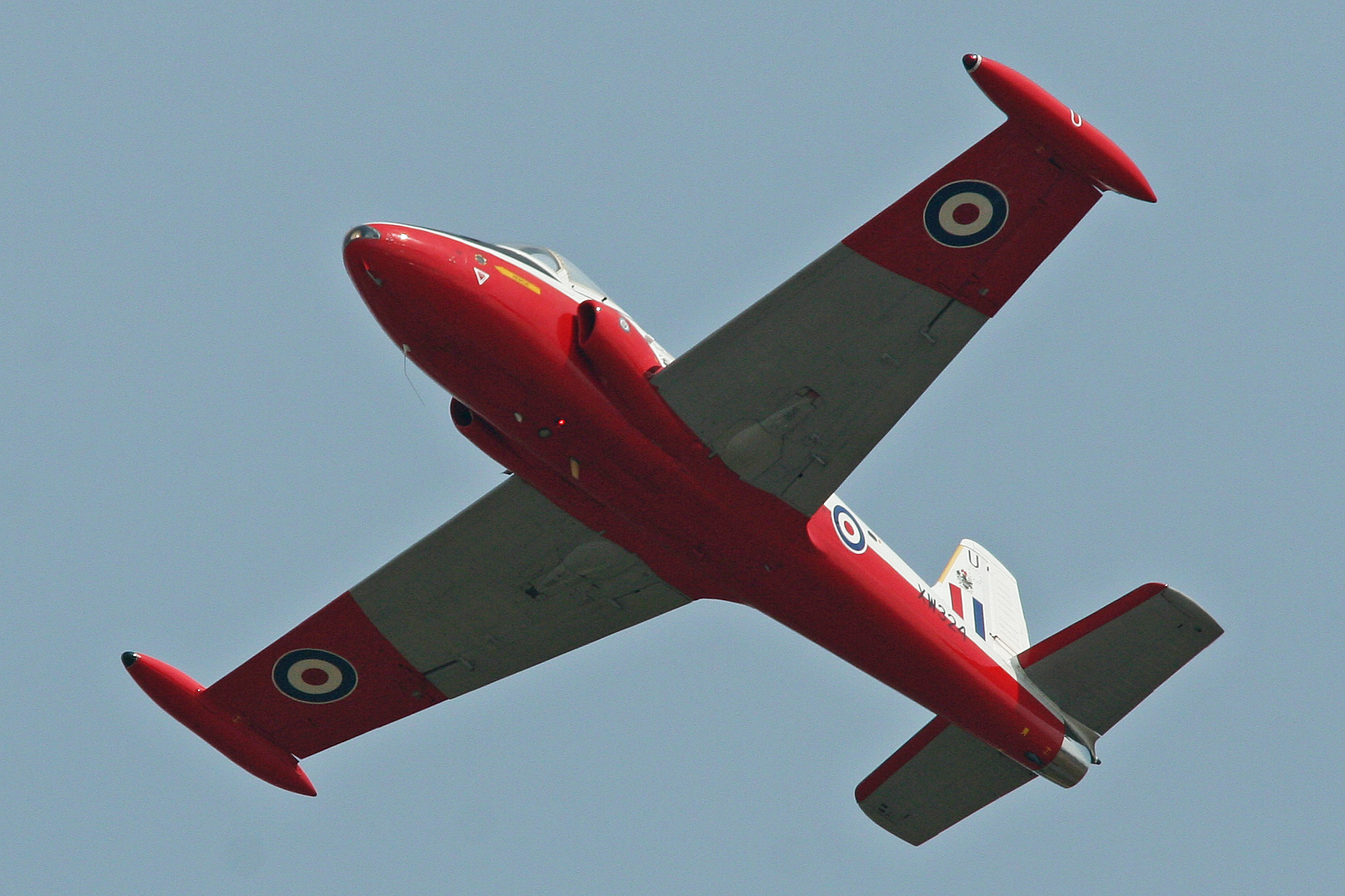
Underside of a preserved BAC Jet Provost in period RAF markings, 2013

Australia

- Royal Australian Air Force evaluated a single T.2 in No. 1 Flying Training School RAAF for six months in 1959.

Ceylon

- Royal Ceylon Air Force received 12 T.51s.

Iraq

- Iraqi Air Force received 20 T.52s, with deliveries starting in August 1964.

Kuwait

- Kuwait Air Force received six T.51s.

Nigeria

- Nigerian Air Force received two ex-Sudanese T.51s in 1967.

Portugal

- Portuguese Air Force evaluated the T.2B in 1959. (Returned to UK in 1960).

Singapore

- Republic of Singapore Air Force operated three (ex-South Yemen Air Force) T.52s from 1975 until 1980.

South Yemen

- People's Republic of Yemen Air Force (originally South Arabian Air Force) received four T.52As in 1967, and then four Strikemasters in 1970.

Sudan

- Sudan Air Force received four T.51s and eight T.52s in 1962. Five T.55s were ordered in 1966.

United Kingdom

- Royal Air Force
  - No. 1 Flying Training School RAF (1961-)
  - No. 2 Flying Training School RAF (1955–70)
  - No. 3 Flying Training School RAF (1961-)
  - No. 6 Flying Training School RAF (1961-68 & 1970-88)
  - No. 7 Flying Training School RAF (1962-66 & 1979-92)
  - Central Flying School (1955-at least 1977)
  - Royal Air Force College Cranwell
  - RAF College of Air Warfare
  - Central Air Traffic Control School

Venezuela

- Venezuelan Air Force received 15 T.52s.

== Surviving aircraft ==
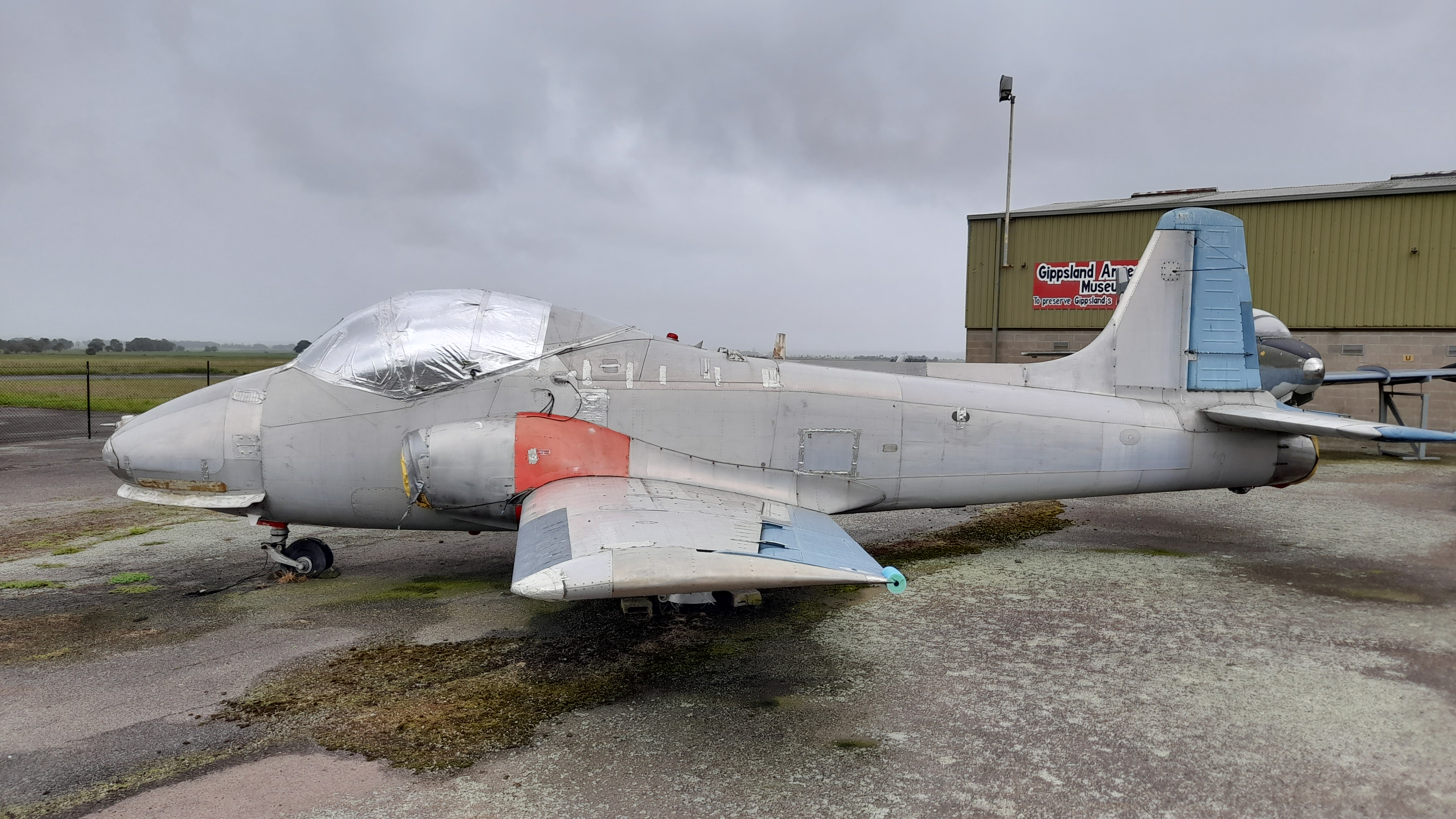
Jet Provost, outdoors in preservation, at Gippsland Armed Forces Museum (West Sale Airport, Victoria)

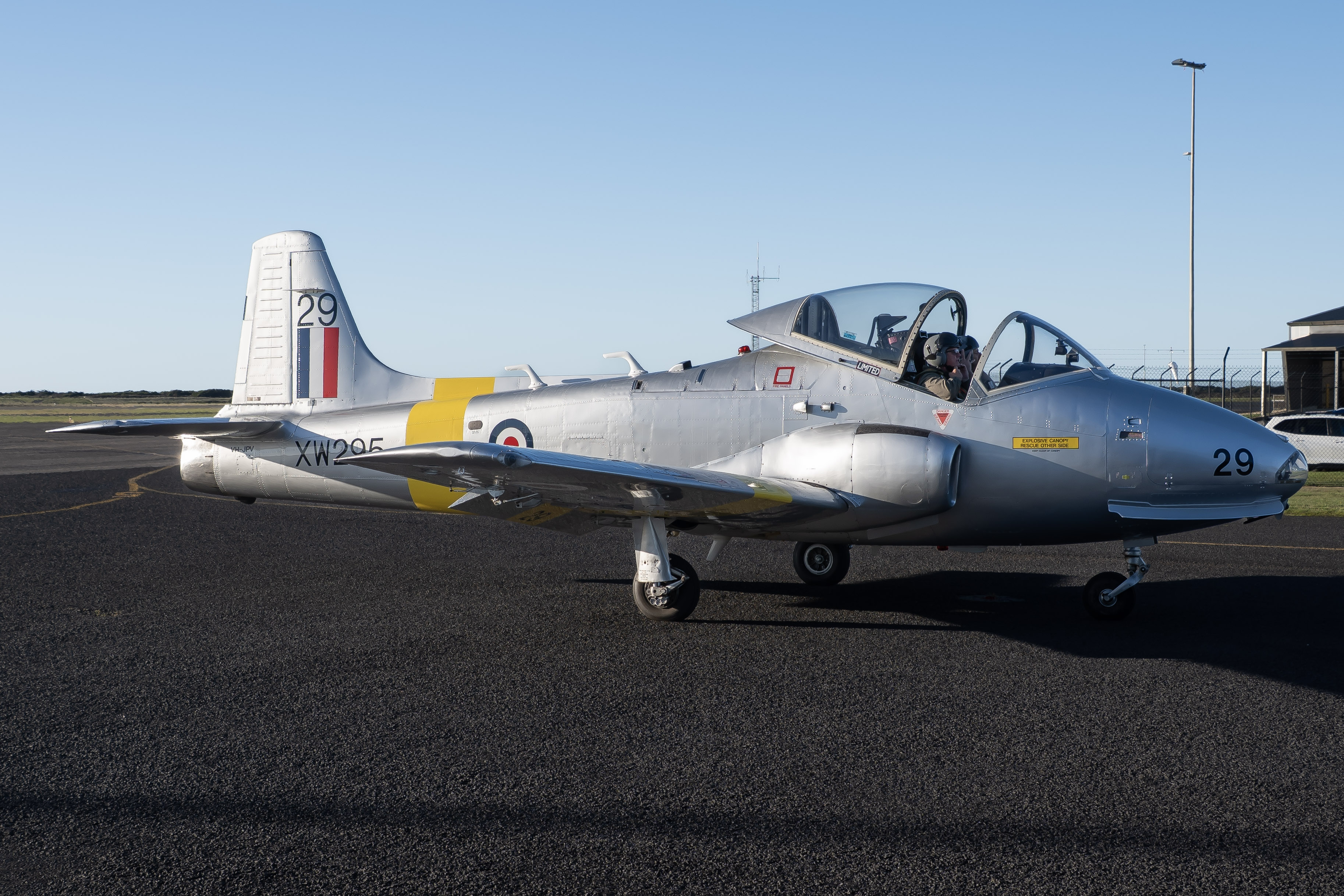
Jet Provost At Devonport Airport

=== Australia ===
- The only Jet Provost T2 to enter service with the RAAF, A99-1, is preserved at the RAAF Museum, RAAF Williams, Point Cook, Victoria, Australia.
- The only flying Jet Provost in Australia, VH-JPV (XW295), a T5 that is owned by Vintage Flying Experiences. This Provost is located at Devonport Airport .

=== Canada ===
- Jet Provost T4, XR679 (C-FDJP), is housed at the Jet Aircraft Museum, London International Airport, Ontario, Canada.

=== Italy ===
- Jet Provost T3A, XM478 is on display at Volandia - Parco e Museo del Volo, Somma Lombardo, Italy.

=== New Zealand ===
- Jet Provost T5A, XW357, is on display at the National Transport and Toy Museum, Wānaka, New Zealand.

=== Sri Lanka ===
- 2 Jet Provost T51s are on display at the Sri Lanka Air Force Museum, Rathmalana, Sri Lanka.

=== United Kingdom ===
- Jet Provost T1, XD674 is on display at Royal Air Force Museum Midlands pending disposal
- Jet Provost T3, XM358 is located at the entrance to Quackers Amusement Centre, Newbridge-on-Wye, Wales.
- Jet Provost T3, XN458 was bought on eBay for £1,050 by a group of people formed for the purpose, the 458 Club. It was put on display after restoration, in the original 1960s colour scheme of 1 FTS, in the beer garden of the Standard Inn, Northallerton, North Yorkshire, England, whose landlord Paul Greig found and snipe-bid for the aircraft. Now located at Fishburn Historic Aviation Centre, Fishburn airfield, County Durham.
- Jet Provost T3, XN637 (registered as "G-BKOU" for civilian use) is owned by a private group and flies from North Weald Airfield.
- Jet Provost T3A XM350, is on display at South Yorkshire Aircraft Museum, along with cockpit sections of T3 XM411, T3 XN511 and T4 XS216.
- Jet Provost T3A, XM405 (registered as "G-TORE" for civilian use), is located on a private farm in Market Harborough.
- Jet Provost T3A, XM412, is located on the airfield at Balado, near Kinross, Scotland.
- Jet Provost T3A, XM414, is located at the Ulster Aviation Society at Long Kesh, Northern Ireland.
- Jet Provost T3A, XM479 (registered as "G-BVEZ" for civilian use), is owned by a private group and flies from Leeds East Airport.
- Jet Provost T3A, XN459, (registered as "G-BWOT" for civilian use) is owned by a private group and flies from North Weald Airfield.

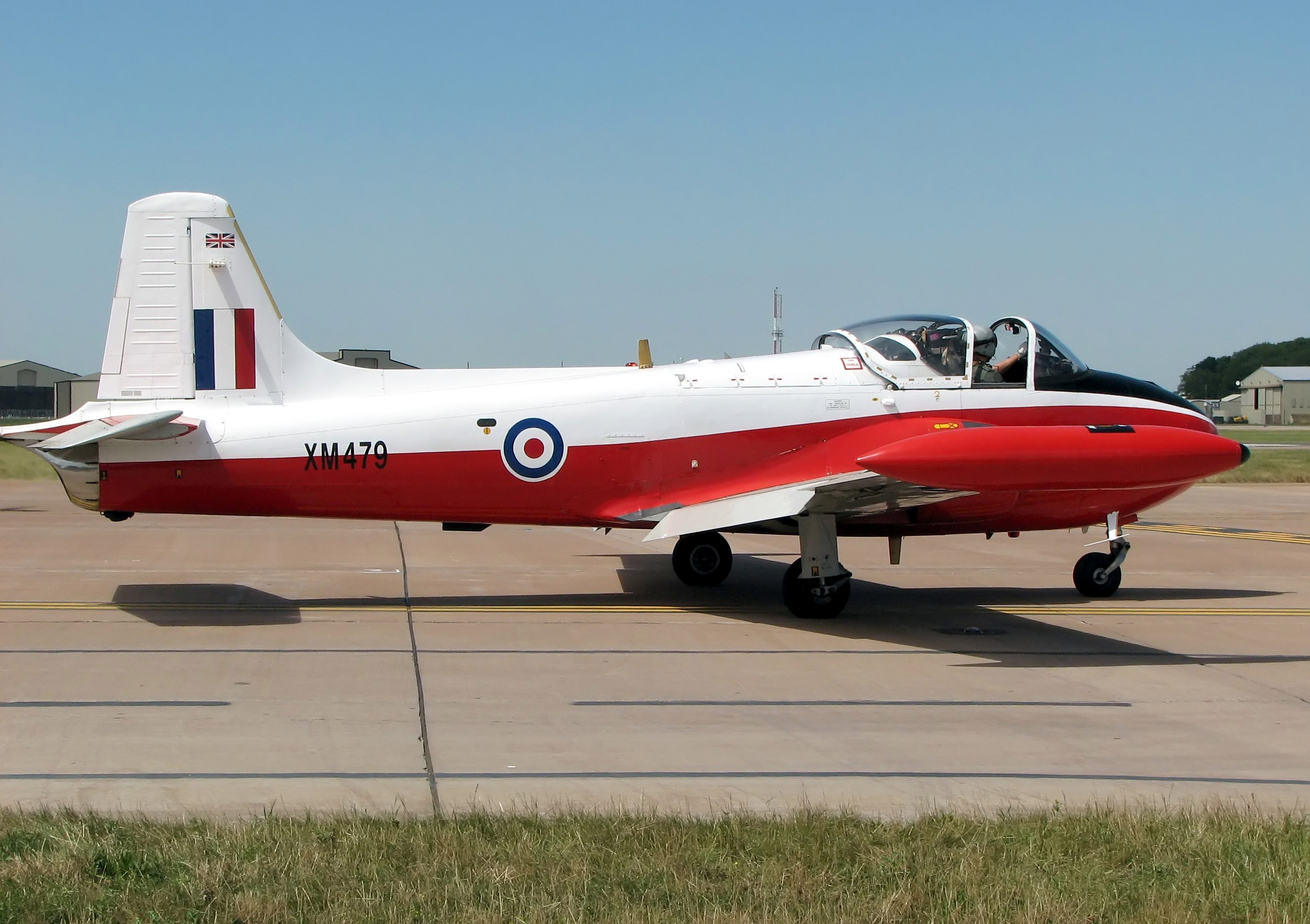
ex-RAF BAC Jet Provost T3A in private ownership

- Jet Provost T3A, XN582, is preserved at the Yorkshire Air Museum, Elvington, York, England. The museum has also acquired T3A XN589 with the closure of nearby RAF Linton-on-Ouse and is restoring it.
- Jet Provost T3A, XN586, is on display at the Brooklands Museum, Weybridge, Surrey, England.
- Jet Provost T4, XP556, is at Cranwell Aviation Heritage Museum, North Rauceby, Lincolnshire, England.
- Jet Provost T4, XP557, is at Dumfries and Galloway Aviation Museum, Dumfries, Scotland.
- Jet Provost T4, XP568 is on static display at East Midlands Aeropark.
- Jet Provost T4, XP627, is on display at North East Land, Sea and Air Museums, Sunderland, Tyne and Wear, England.
- Jet Provost T4, XP640, is preserved at the Yorkshire Air Museum, Elvington, York, England, along with the cockpit section of T3 XM373.
- Jet Provost T4, XS209, is located at the Solway Aviation Museum, Carlisle Lake District Airport, England.
- Jet Provost T4, XS228, converted to T52A for South Arabia and exported as G-27-7 before serialled as 104, then South Yemen AF still as 104 until 1975, then 352 for Royal Singapore Airforce until 1980. Purchased by private owners in UK in 1983 with new reg G-PROV. Flown most recently flying in original Southern Arabian markings as G-PROV but marked as 104 until at least 2023, current status unclear.
- Jet Provost T5A, XW310, is located at the Bournemouth Aviation Museum, England.
- Jet Provost T5, XW323, is located at the Royal Air Force Museum London, Hendon Aerodrome, London, England.
- Jet Provost T5, XW324 (registered as G-BWSG for civilian use), is stored at East Midlands Airport, England.
- Jet Provost T5A, XW405, is on display at the Hartlepool College of Further Education, Hartlepool, England. The college also uses T5 XW309 and T5A XW404 to educate students.

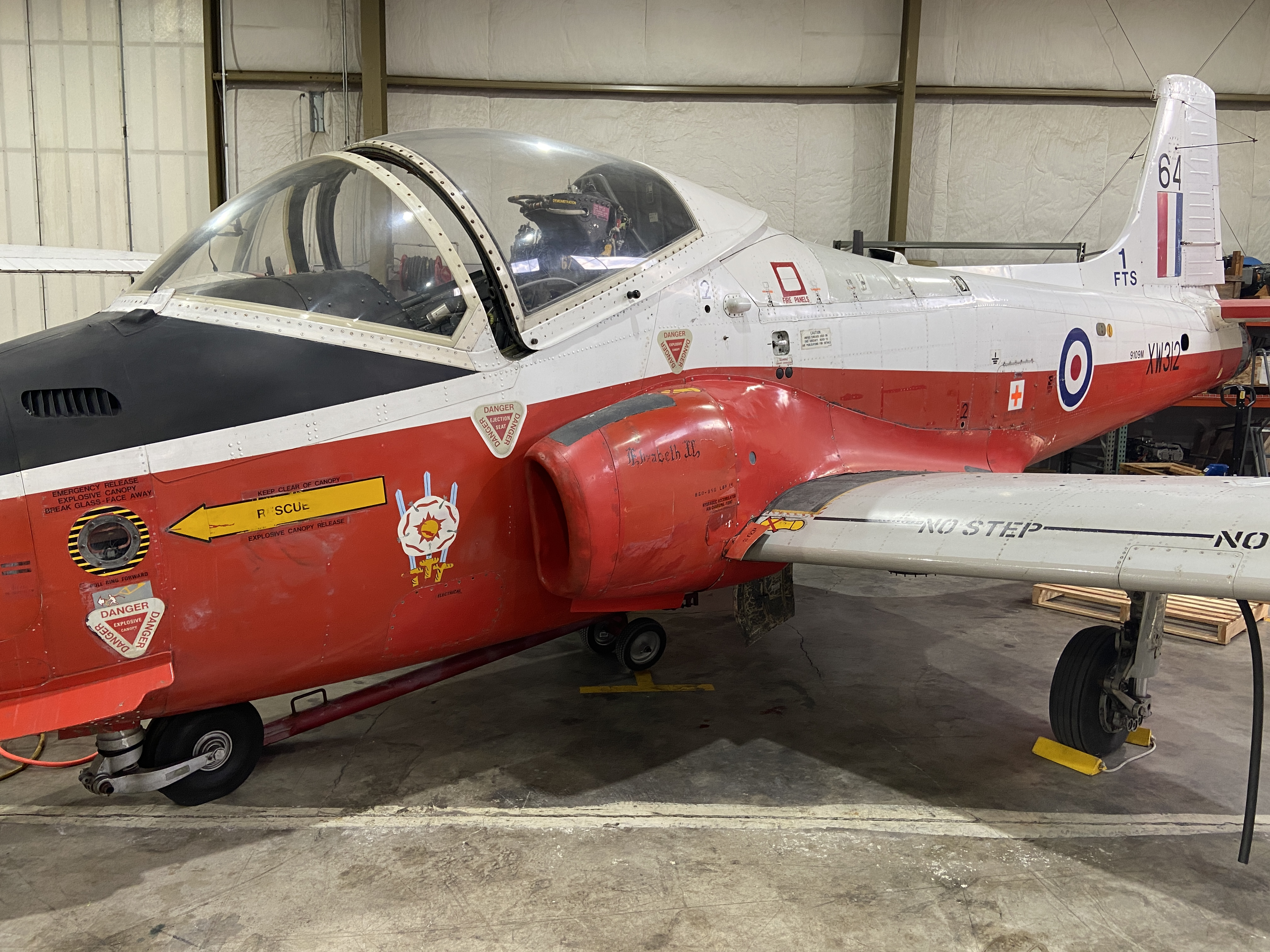
XW312 Jet Provost, Located at the Everett Community College. Paine Field, Washington

=== United States ===
- Jet Provost T3, XM349, is on static display at Air Heritage Aviation Museum in Beaver Falls, Pennsylvania.
- Jet Provost T3A, XM357, is housed at the Tillamook Air Museum, Oregon.
- Jet Provost T3A, XM464, is on static display at Pima Air & Space Museum in Tucson, Arizona.

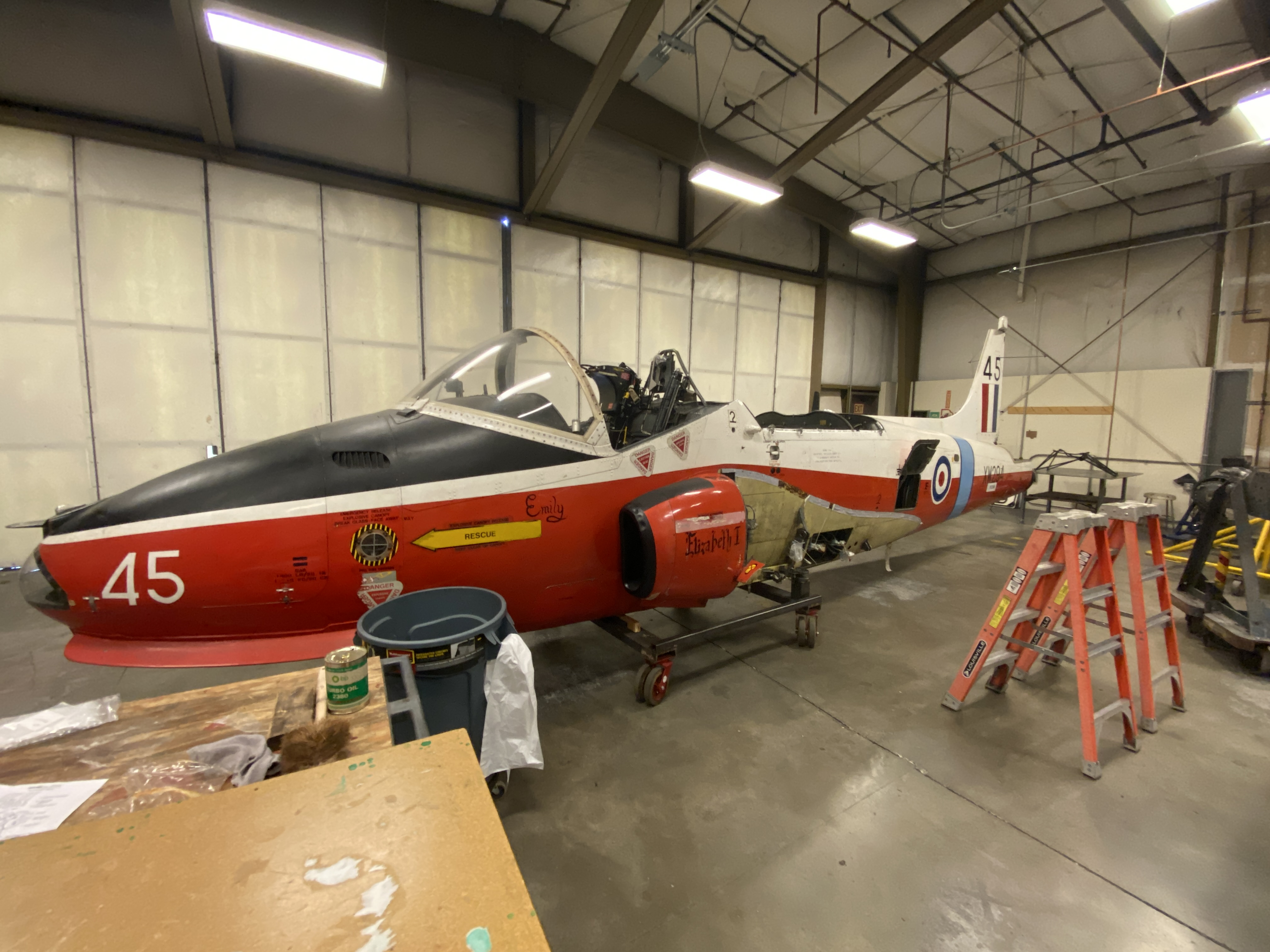
XW294 at the Everett Community College. Paine Field, WA

- Jet Provost T5A, XW306, is privately owned and registered as N313A

== Specifications (Jet Provost T.5) ==
Data from Jane's All The World's Aircraft 1971–72, Flight International, BAE Systems

General characteristics

- Crew: 2
- Length: 34 ft 0 in (10.36 m)
- Wingspan: 35 ft 4 in (10.77 m)
- Height: 10 ft 2 in (3.10 m)
- Wing area: 213.7 sq ft (19.85 m^{2})
- Airfoil: root: NACA 23015 mod; tip: NACA 4412 mod
- Empty weight: 4,888 lb (2,217 kg)
- Gross weight: 6,989 lb (3,170 kg)
- Max takeoff weight: 9,200 lb (4,173 kg)
- Powerplant: 1 × Armstrong Siddeley Viper Mk.102 / Mk.202 turbojet engine, 1,700 lbf (7.6 kN) thrust

2,500 lbf (11,120.55 N) Mk.202

Performance

- Maximum speed: 382 kn (440 mph, 707 km/h) at 25,000 ft (7,620 m)
- Range: 780 nmi (900 mi, 1,440 km) with tip tanks.
- Service ceiling: 36,750 ft (11,200 m)
- Rate of climb: 4,000 ft/min (20 m/s)
- Wing loading: 32.7 lb/sq ft (160 kg/m^{2})

Armament

- Guns: 2× 0.303 in (7.7 mm) machine guns Mark 55
- Rockets:
  - 6× 60 lb (27 kg) or
  - 12× 25 lb (11 kg) or
  - 28x 68 mm SNEB rockets in four pods Mark 55
- Bombs: ** 4× 540 lb (245 kg) Mark 55

== See also ==
External videos
- A pair of preserved Jet Provosts performing an aerial display in formation
- Footage of a Jet Provost being serviced at RAF Linton-on-Ouse in 1985
- In-cockpit view of low-level flight in a Jet Provost

- Red Pelicans

Related development

- BAC Strikemaster
- Percival Provost

Aircraft of comparable role, configuration, and era

- Aero L-29 Delfín
- Canadair CT-114 Tutor
- Cessna T-37 Tweet
- Fouga CM.170 Magister
- HAL Kiran
- Hispano HA-200
- Saab 105

Related lists

- List of aircraft of the Royal Air Force
