= SXE =

SXE may refer to:

- East Sussex, county in England, Chapman code
- West Sale Airport, IATA airport code "SXE"

sXE may refer to:

- Straight edge, subculture of hardcore punk
