= Hartlepool College =

Hartlepool College can refer to:

- Hartlepool College of Further Education
- Hartlepool Sixth Form College
