= Gus Robinson Developments =

British construction company

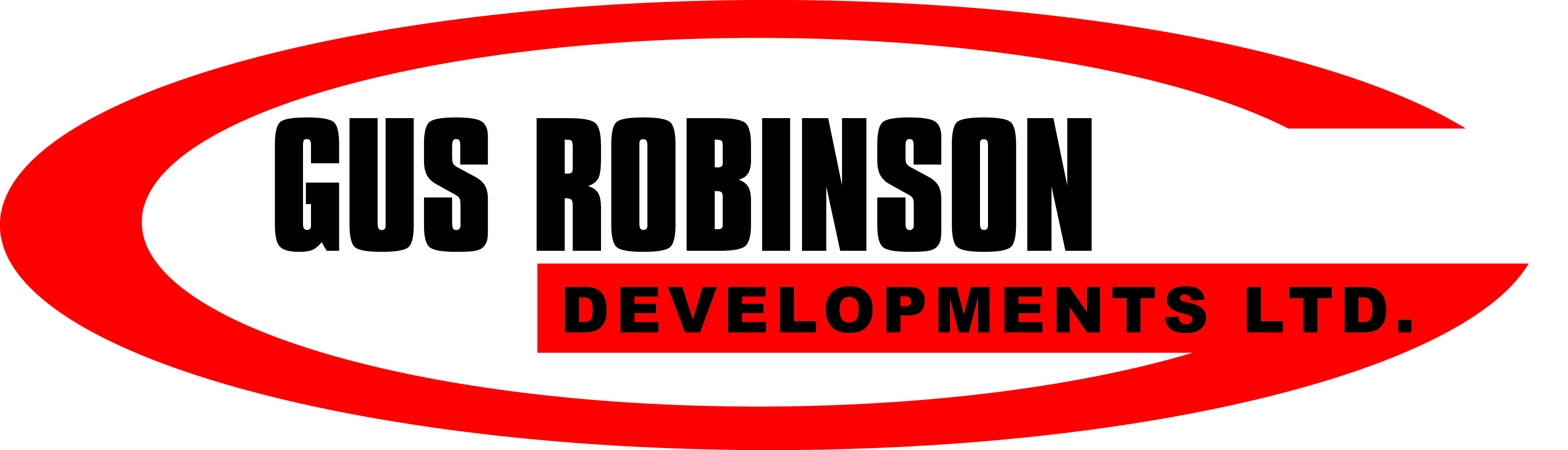

Gus Robinson Developments is a UK construction company based in Hartlepool, in the North East, England.

The company was founded in 1976 by Gus Robinson, who after spending time in the merchant navy returned to his hometown to set up the construction company with the aim of becoming “a force for good in society”. This mission statement has remained with the company for 40 years.

Gus Robinson Developments now works in the social housing market, while also delivering a range of different construction projects across the UK. In line with its mission statement, the company set up the Gus Robinson Foundation, encouraging young people to further themselves through education.

== History ==
After setting up in 1976 Managing Director Gus Robinson built up the business delivering construction contracts throughout the North East. The company also set up Costa Blanca Homes in Spain, building and selling apartments. From the beginning, the firm employed apprentices as a key part of the workforce. Even at present an average one fifth of the payroll began as apprentices at the company.

In 2011, Robinson committed suicide, leaving his son Daniel Robinson to run the business as chairman. Daniel, who had worked in his father's business growing up, steered the business into the social housing market and gained the company contracts with Thirteen Group, Erimus, Northstar Housing and others.

That progress was reflected in May 2014 when the company was given ‘SME of the Year’ and ‘Leadership and People Development’ awards in the Constructing Excellence North East Awards. The company was awarded the RoSPA President’s Award in August 2014 for 10 consecutive years of achieving the RoSPA gold standard for health and safety.

In May 2015 Land and Development Director Steve Bell was promoted to Managing Director at the firm. He has over 20 years' experience on site and formerly worked as a construction manager for Vela Homes, now part of Thirteen Group.

In 2015 the company won the overall Heart of the Community award in the North East Business Awards.

== Services ==
Gus Robinson Developments offers construction, small works and mechanical services. The company works in a range of different industries including chemical plants, hospitals, heavy industry, airports, hotels, residential, retail, commercial and education.

== Gus Robinson Foundation ==
The Gus Robinson Foundation was launched in November 2014 and was designed to offer educational scholarships to deserving candidates based on merit and achievements. The company in particular works in partnership with Hartlepool College of Further Education and Durham University.

The foundation offers five opportunities to young people: Apprentice of the Year, a sporting achievement, two aerospace cadetships and a university scholarship.
