= Shearwater Aviation Museum =

Aviation museum in Nova Scotia, Canada

- Location within Nova Scotia
- Established: 1978
- Location: Shearwater, Nova Scotia, Canada, at CFB Shearwater
- Coordinates: 44°37′40″N 63°30′52″W
- Type: Aviation museum
- Website: shearwateraviationmuseum.ns.ca

The Shearwater Aviation Museum is an aviation museum located at CFB Shearwater in Shearwater, Nova Scotia. The museum acquires, conserves, organizes, researches and interprets to Canadian Forces personnel and the public at large for their study, education and enjoyment, artifacts and documents which exemplify the history of Canadian maritime military aviation.

== History ==
The museum was founded in 1978 and was originally located a single floor of a barrack block. However, in August 1995 the museum reopened in a former gymnasium on the base. The museum was expanded in August 2001, with the opening of a new addition.

Two CH-124s were donated by the Canadian Forces in 2018.

== Exhibits ==
A number of permanent exhibits are featured at the museum with maritime aviation and naval history being a key theme. Included is an exhibit about HMCS Bonaventure, Canada's last aircraft carrier. The exhibit includes a reconstruction of the briefing room aboard the aircraft carrier, complete with original seats. Also on display is a replica of the map wall used by the RCAF Eastern Air Command to coordinate the Battle of the Atlantic.

== Aircraft on display ==
- Canadair CT-114 Tutor 114075
- Canadair CT-133 Silver Star 133038
- Canadair CT-133 Silver Star 133618
- de Havilland Canada CP-121 Tracker 1557
- Fairey Firefly FR.I PP462
- Fairey Swordfish IV HS469
- General Motors AS.3 Avenger 85861
- Grumman CP-121 Tracker 1501
- McDonnell CF-101B Voodoo 101063
- McDonnell F2H-3 Banshee 126402
- North American Harvard IIA 2777
- Piasecki H-25
- Sikorsky CH-124B 12401 (in paint scheme as delivered)
- Sikorsky CH-124A 12431 (as retired)
- Sikorsky HO4S-3 55885

== See also ==
- National Naval Aviation Museum
