= Hartlepool College of Further Education =

Location
- Stockton Street; Hartlepool, England, TS24 7NT
- Coordinates: 54.6840°N 1.2100°W

Information
- Type: Education
- Established: 1897
- Principal: Darren Hankey
- Website: www.hartlepoolfe.ac.uk

Hartlepool College of Further Education is a non-denominational mixed further education college based in Hartlepool, United Kingdom, providing courses to students aged 16 and over. The college has existed in several forms since 1849, but occupied its now familiar location on Stockton Street in the early 1960s. In 2006 plans were made to replace the college building with a modern, purpose-built campus with dedicated specialist areas in Engineering, Aerospace, Automotive, Environmental Technologies, Construction, Hospitality and Catering, Health and Beauty, Sport and many others. The new building was constructed between 2009 and 2011 at a cost of £53 million, with final groundwork completed in summer 2012. The college was officially opened by Andrew Mountbatten-Windsor in February 2012. Its Skills Academy was opened by Peter Mandelson in October 2011.

Resources to be found in the new college include an aircraft hangar containing two ex-RAF Jet Provost T5s, a Westland Gazelle Helicopter and a Rolls-Royce airliner engine, an 800m square open-air "Learning Terrace" for environmental technologies, a dedicated Sixth Form Centre, a sports science laboratory and CryoSpa, a large conference centre, a restaurant (The Flagship) and the Luminary Suite, a centre containing health, hair and beauty salons and a fully equipped fitness suite. Many of the college's facilities are available commercially to the public, and open extended hours and weekends.

The college is the largest provider of apprenticeships in the Tees Valley, and has contact with over 2,000 businesses and employers. Its employer engagement is rated "Outstanding" by OfSTED.
