= Gippsland Armed Forces Museum =

Coordinates: 38.096720°S 146.964566°E

- Established: 2003; 23 years ago
- Location: Lyon Crescent, Fulham, Victoria, 3851
- Type: History museum and research library

Gippsland Armed Forces Museum is a military museum located at West Sale Airport, Victoria, Australia. It has over 1,500 items in its collection.

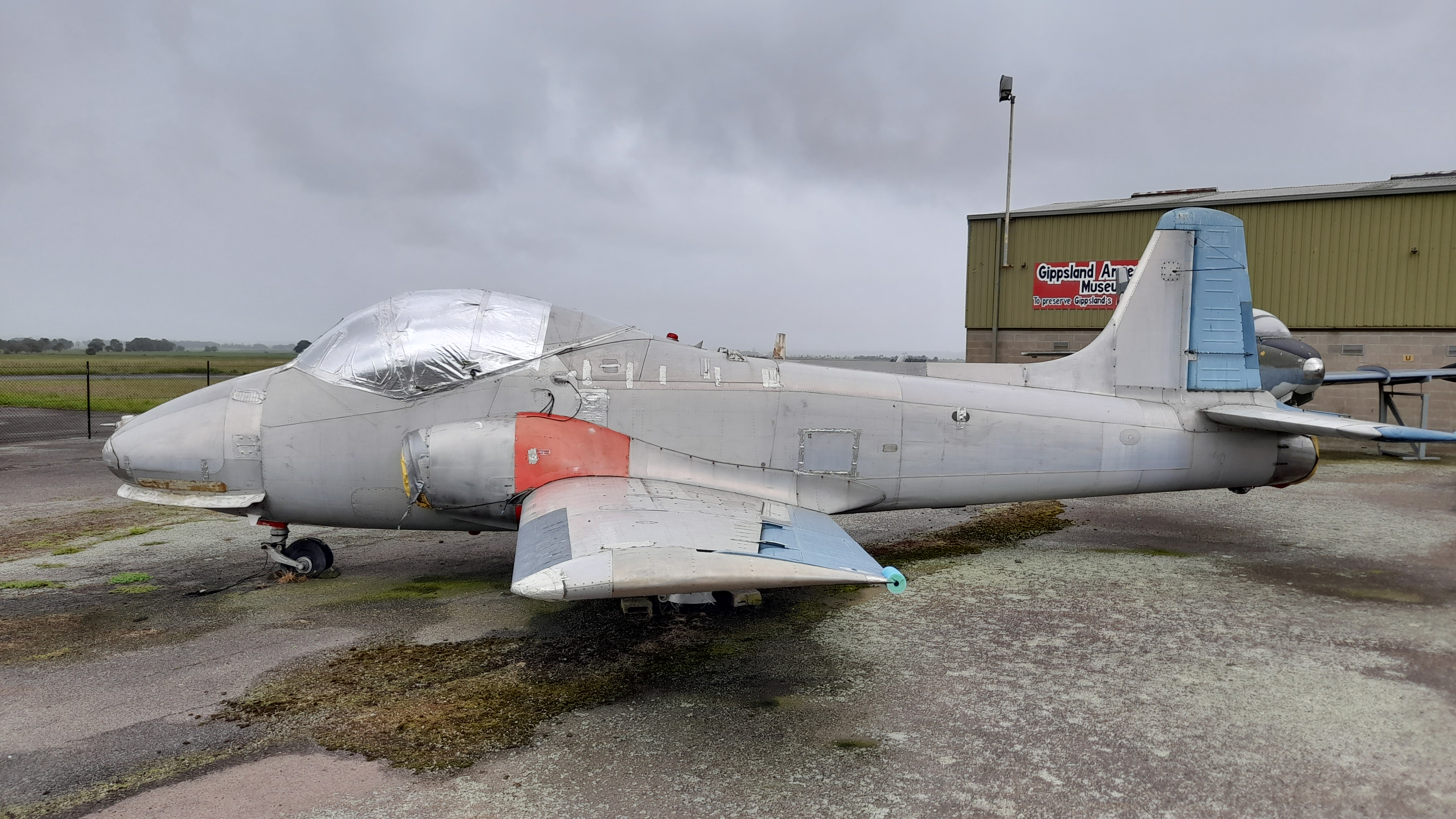
Jet Provost, outdoors in preservation, at Gippsland Armed Forces Museum (West Sale Airport, Victoria)

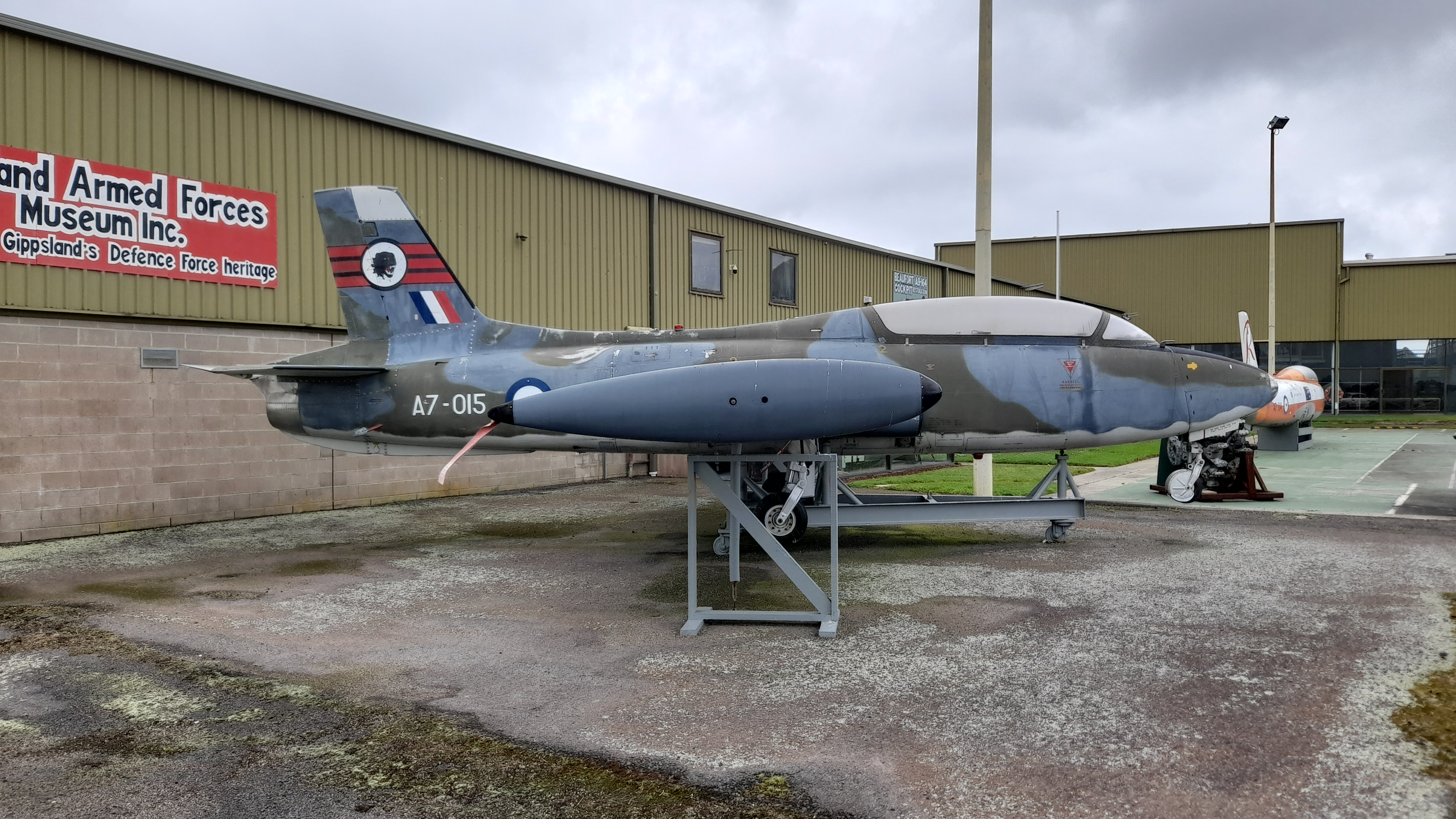
Aermacchi MB-326 (Australia) A7-014 (Roulettes livery) and A7-015 at Gippsland Armed Forces Museum

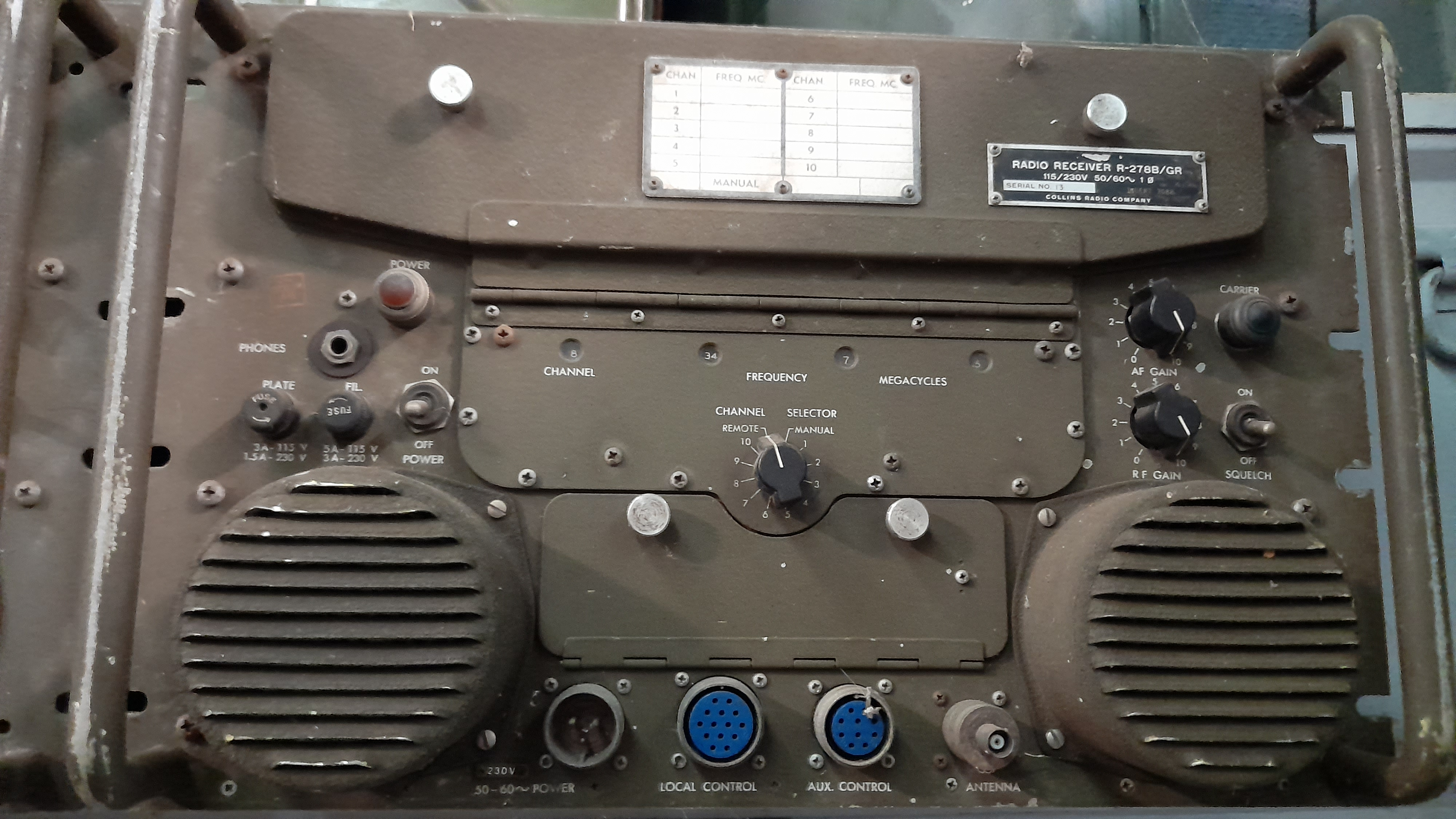
Collins Radio Receiver R-278B/GR at Gippsland Armed Forces Museum

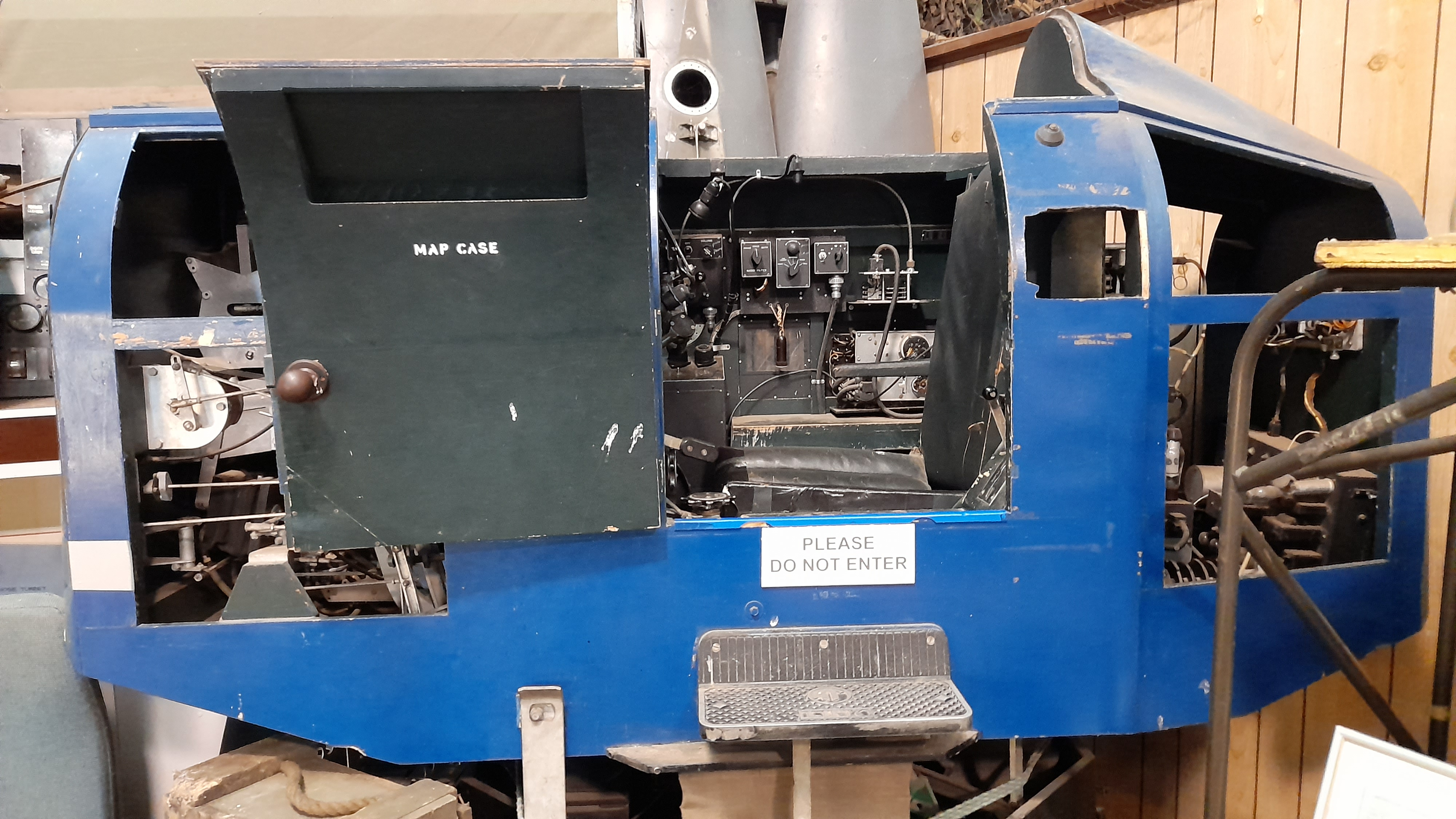
Link Trainer at Gippsland Armed Forces Museum
