= West Sale Airport =

Airport in Sale, Victoria, Australia

- IATA: SXE; ICAO: YWSL

Summary
- Airport type: Public
- Operator: Wellington Shire Council
- Location: Sale, Victoria
- Elevation AMSL: 72 ft / 22 m
- Coordinates: 38°05′30″S 146°57′55″E

Map
- Location in Victoria

Runways
Direction	Length		Surface
Direction	m	ft	Surface
05/23	500	1,640	Grass
09/27	1,527	5,010	Asphalt
14/32	699	2,293	Grass
- Sources: Australian AIP and aerodrome chart

West Sale Airport (IATA: SXE, ICAO: YWSL) is located about 5 nautical miles (9.3 km; 5.8 mi) west of Sale, Victoria, Australia, off the Princes Highway.

== History ==
=== World War II ===
During World War II, the aerodrome was requisitioned by the Royal Australian Air Force in 1941. Known as RAAF Base West Sale and RAAF Station West Sale, the aerodrome was home to No. 3 Bombing and Gunnery School and Air Gunnery School until December 1945, when the aerodrome was handed back to its owners.

=== Post–war ===
From 1991 to 2016 there were 11 Grumman S-2 Tracker anti-submarine aircraft formerly of the Royal Australian Navy stored at the airport.

The Gippsland Armed Forces Museum is located at West Sale Airport.

== See also ==
- List of airports in Victoria
