= JC Vickery =

British consumer goods company

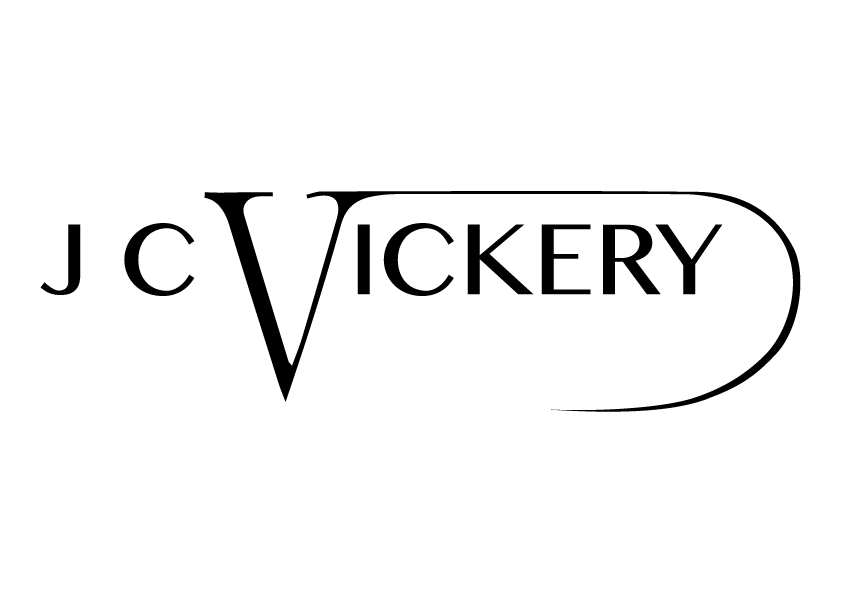
- Industry: Consumer goods
- Founded: 1890
- Founder: John Collard Vickery, Arthur Thomas Hobbs
- Headquarters: London, United Kingdom
- Key people: John Collard Vickery; Arthur Thomas Hobbs; William Griggs
- Products: stationery Leather goods watches jewellery

JC Vickery was a British consumer goods company founded in 1890 in London, UK.

== Early history ==
John Collard Vickery and his then partner, Arthur Thomas Hobbs, bought up the long established business of William Griggs, a stationer and bookseller at 183, Regent Street in c.1890. William Griggs had been at 183 Regent street as early as 1843 and 1854. When they took over they expanded the stock to include jewellery, dressing cases, gold and silver lines.

Continuing alone after 1891, Vickery extended his premises in 1900 to 179, 181 and 183 Regent Street, with showrooms to the rear at 1 New Burlington Place.

== Post 1930 ==
The business was acquired by James Walker Ltd in the 1930s.

John Culme in his 'Directory of Gold & Silversmiths' relates a story regarding Vickery: "Shortly before his death, the late G. S. Saunders of James Walker Ltd., told me that J. C. Vickery's business reached the height of its success before the First World War. Vickery, who would travel each day from Streatham to Regent Street in his own carriage, stopped his coachman one day in order to examine a leaf on the drive outside his house. Stepping down from the vehicle he picked up the leaf to pin to it a note. As he continued his journey his gardeners were astonished to read 'Why has this leaf been here for two days?'"
