= Brazil Iron =

Producer of Iron Ore

Brazil Iron Limited
- Type: Private
- Industry: Metals; Mining
- Founded: 2011; 15 years ago
- Headquarters: London, England, UK
- Area served: Brazil; Europe; Asia
- Key people: Gordon Toll; (Chairman); Guy Saxton; (President); Aksel Azrac; (Company director; Orlando Fairbourne; (Shareholder); Celandine Fairbourne; (Shareholder)
- Products: Iron ore; Manganese
- Website: braziliron.com.br

Brazil Iron Limited is a privately held company, headquartered in the United Kingdom. The company holds 24 contiguous iron and manganese tenements, through its Brazilian subsidiary, Brazil Iron Mineração LTDA.

According to the Brazilian National Mining Agency (ANM) Brazil Iron is the largest foreign investor in mineral research in Brazil, accounting for 63% of the mineral research investment in Bahia state.

== History ==
Brazil Iron and its Brazilian subsidiary were founded to sustainably explore for, develop and produce iron ore products, such as lump, sinter feed and pellet feed. The company was formed after the acquisition of mining rights in Brazil between 2011 and 2017.
