= Cirkle =

British public relations agency

Cirkle Communications Ltd.
- Industry: Communications
- Founded: 1998
- Headquarters: London, UK
- Key people: Ruth Kieran (CEO), Kate Gibson (Managing Director - Consumer Brands), Amy Searle (Managing Director - B2B)
- Products: Public Relations
- Number of employees: 70 (2023)
- Website: https://www.cirkle.com/

Cirkle is a public relations agency with teams specialising across Consumer, B2B and Corporate services, supported by a strong social and digital offering as well as a specialism in Influencer Relations. It was founded in 1998 and was acquired in 2022 by Accordience.
